= Manaus =

Capital and largest city of Amazonas, Brazil

- Metropolis
- Município de Manaus; Municipality of Manaus
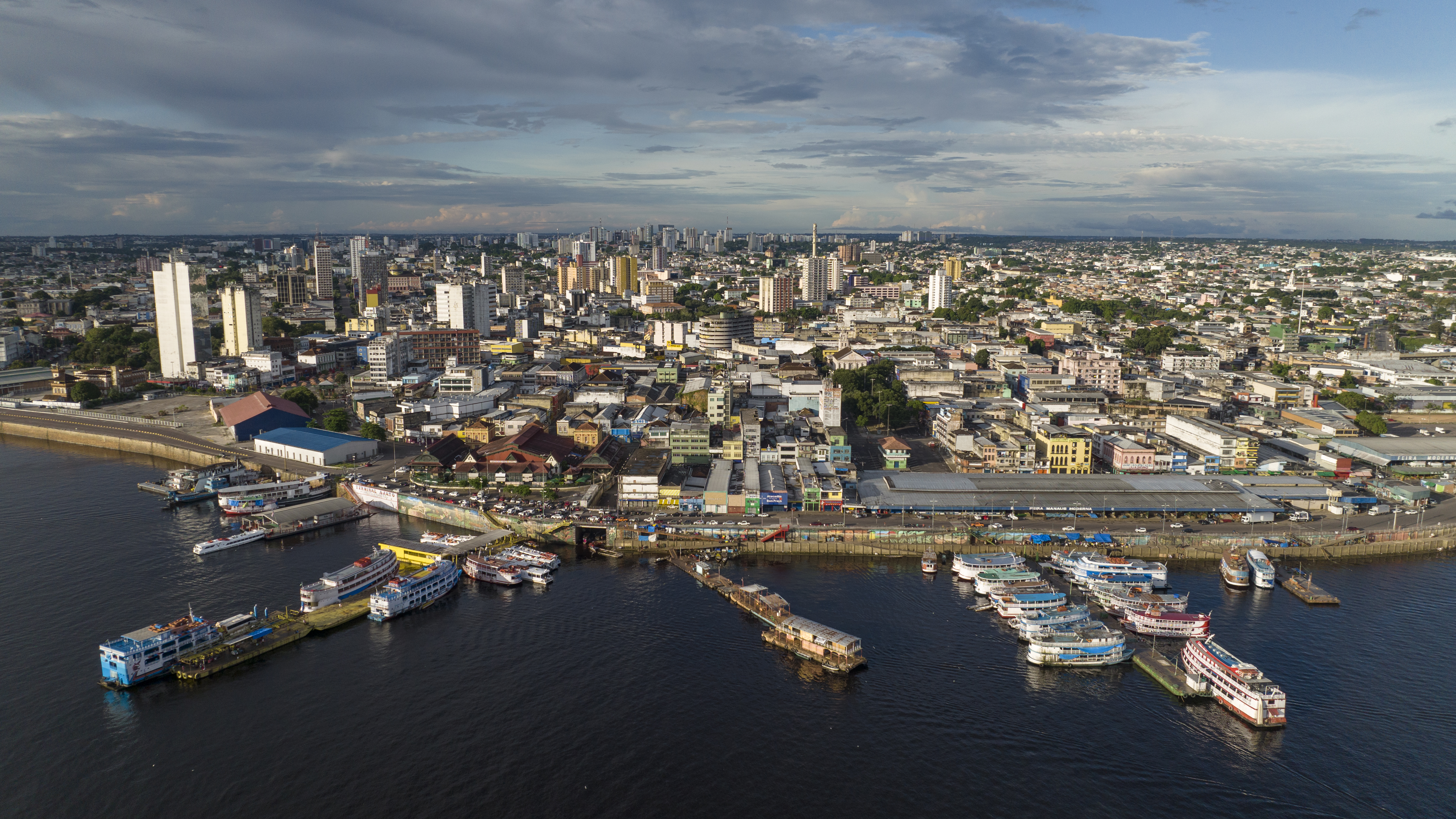
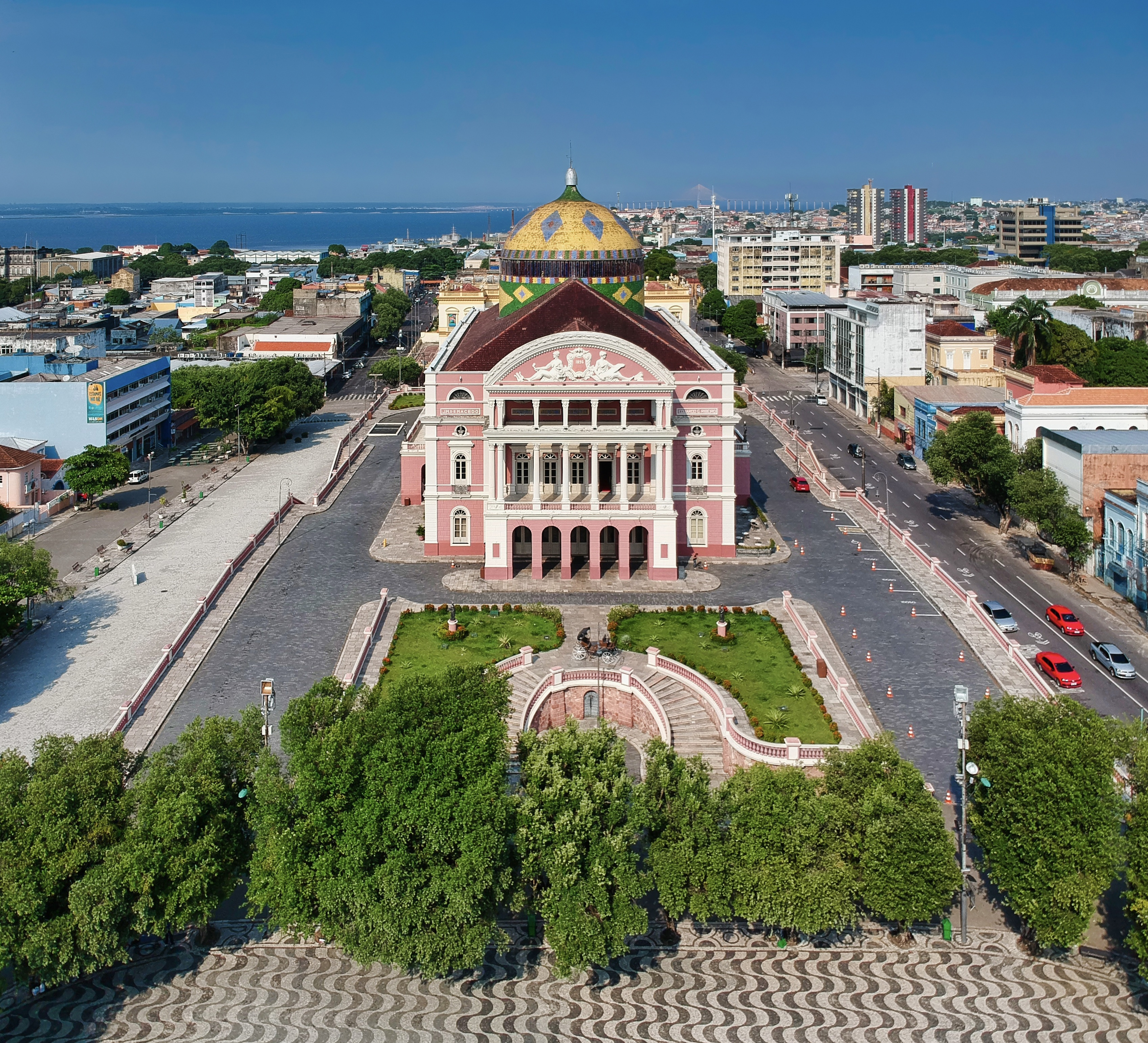
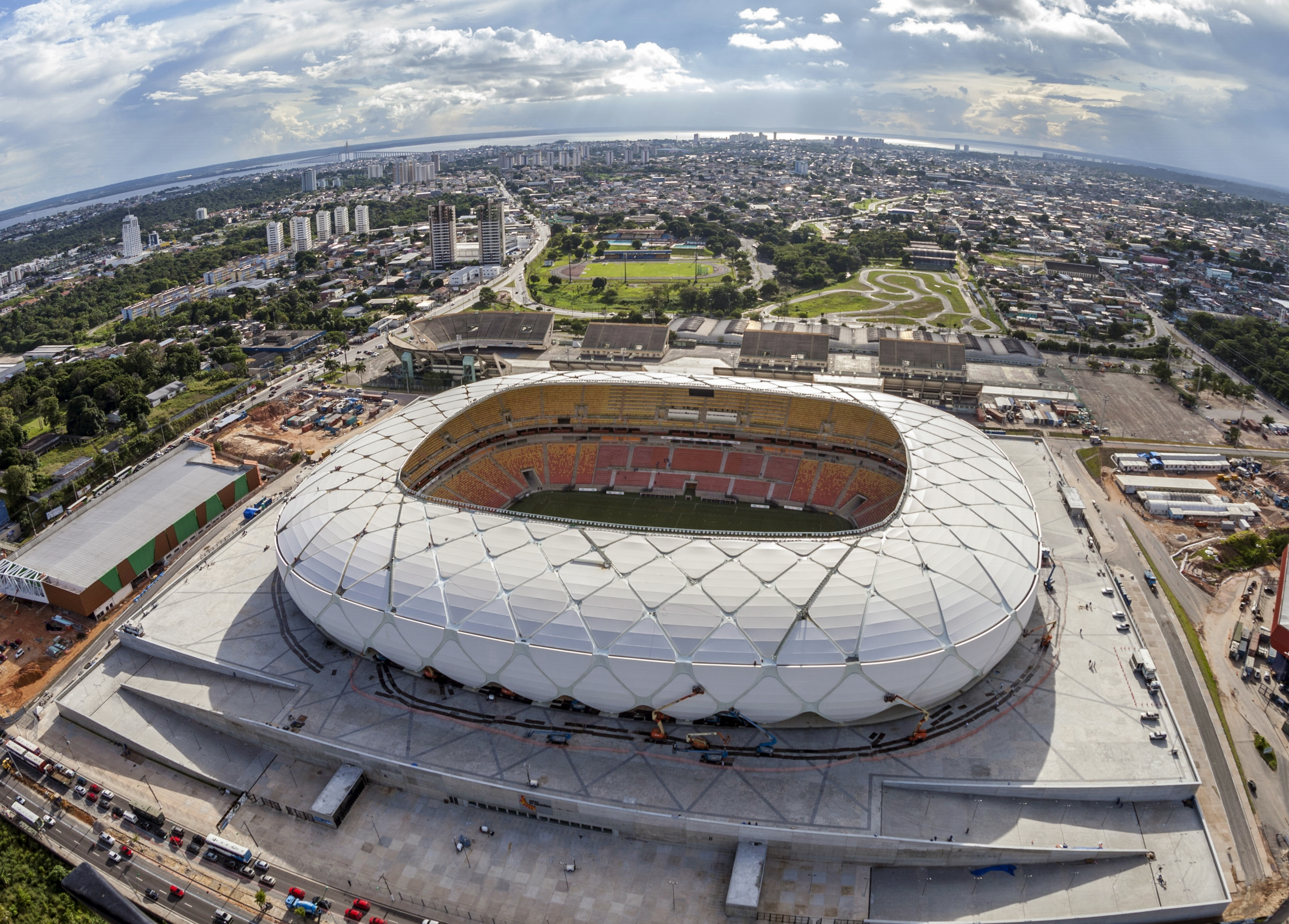
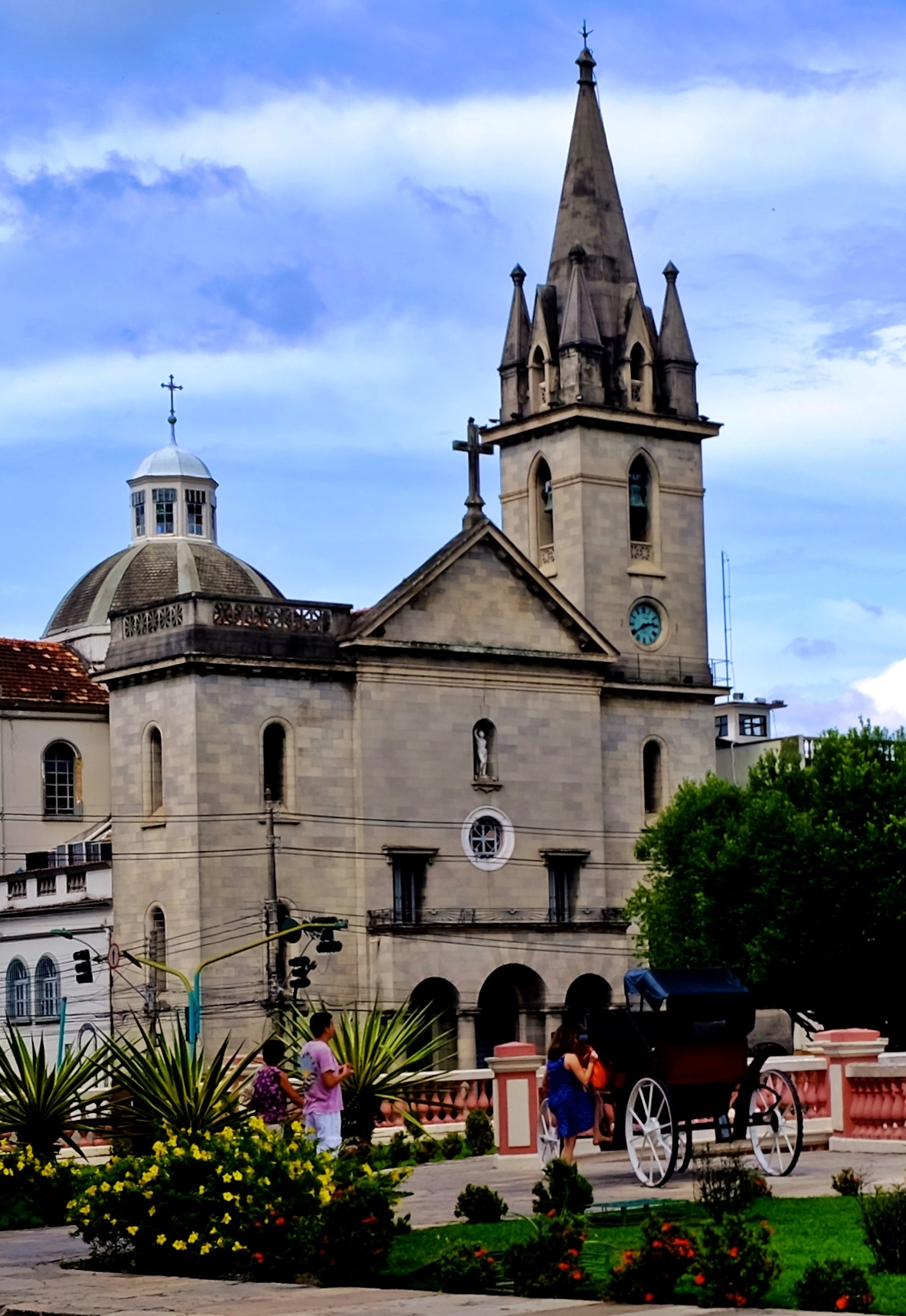
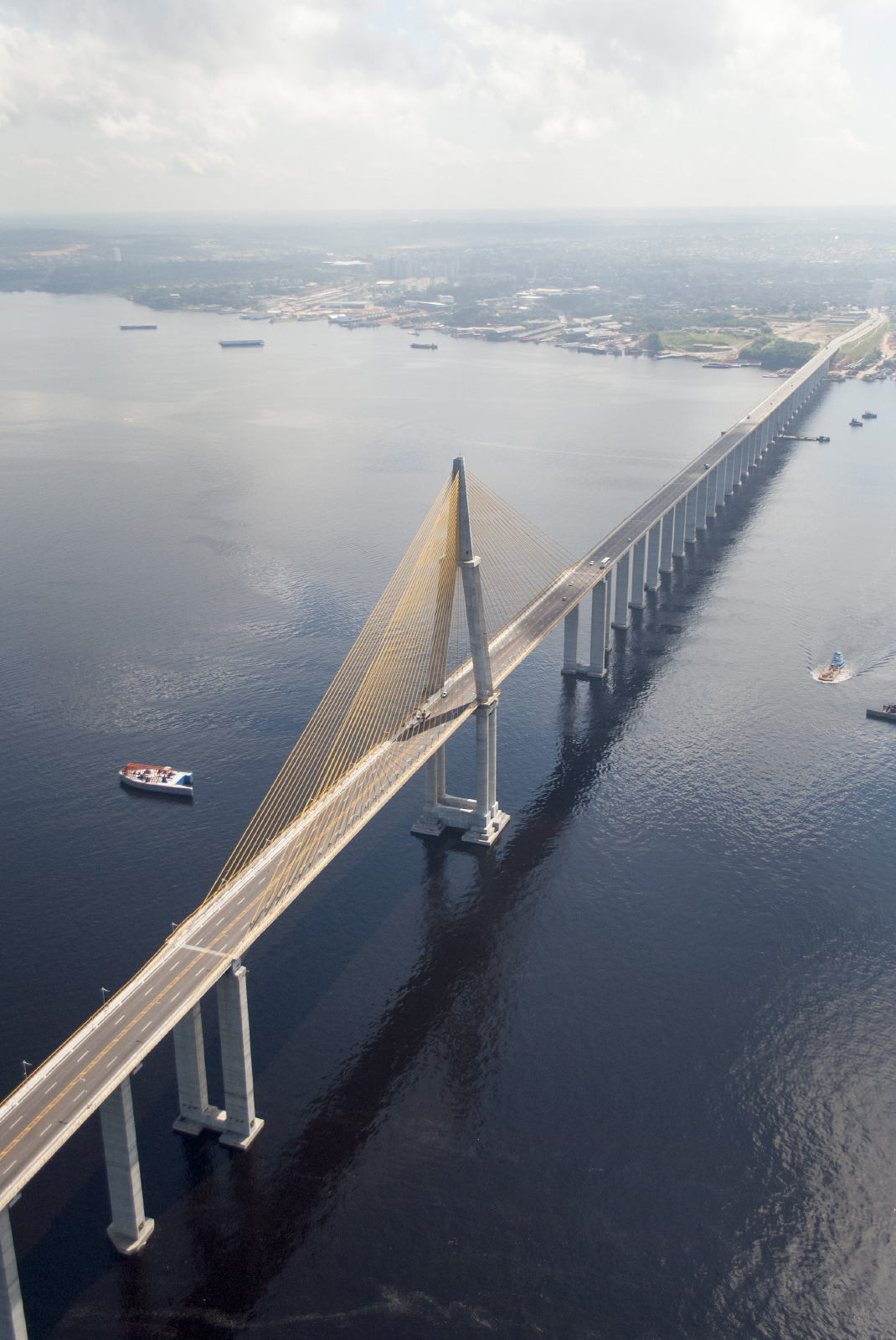
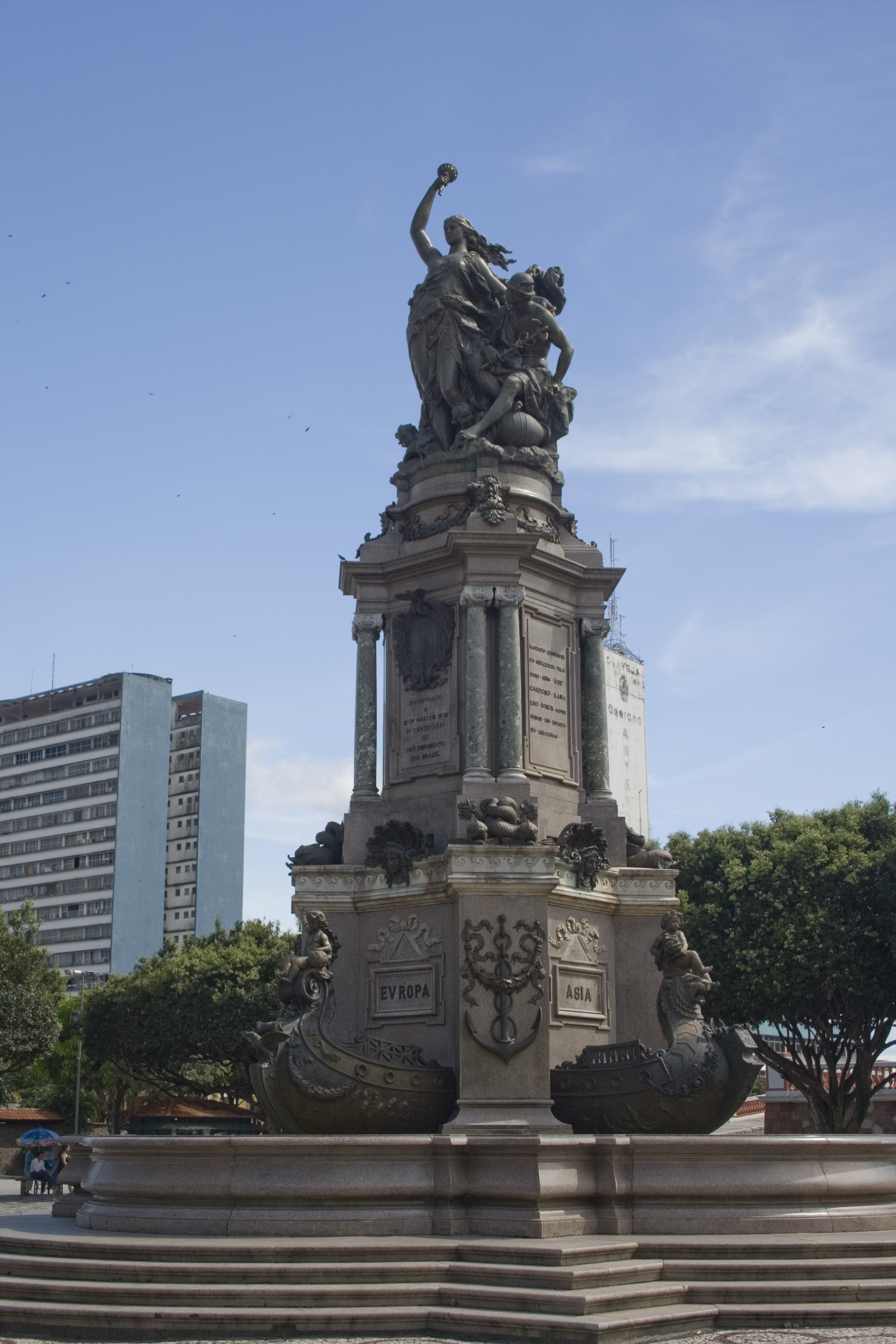
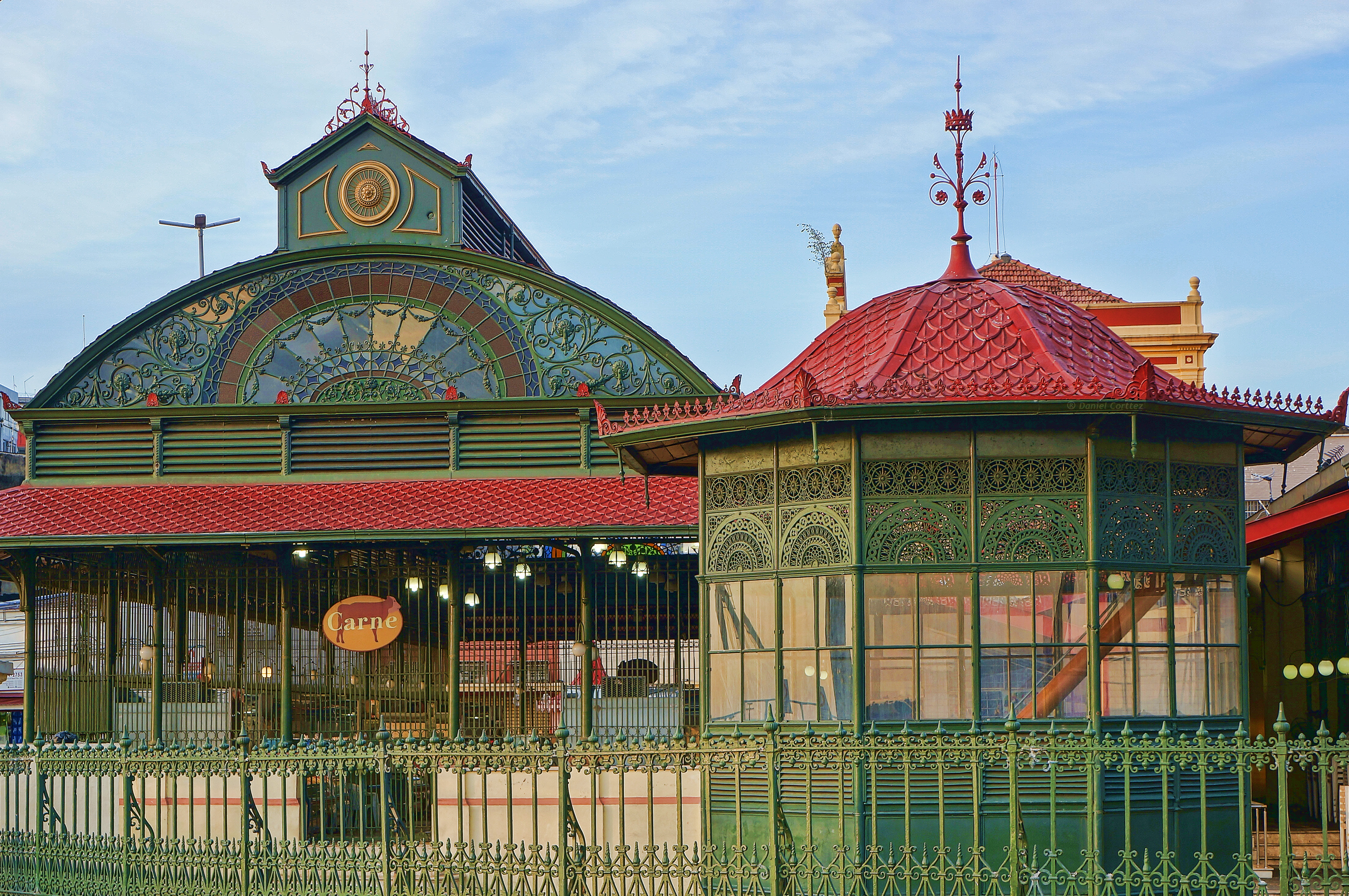
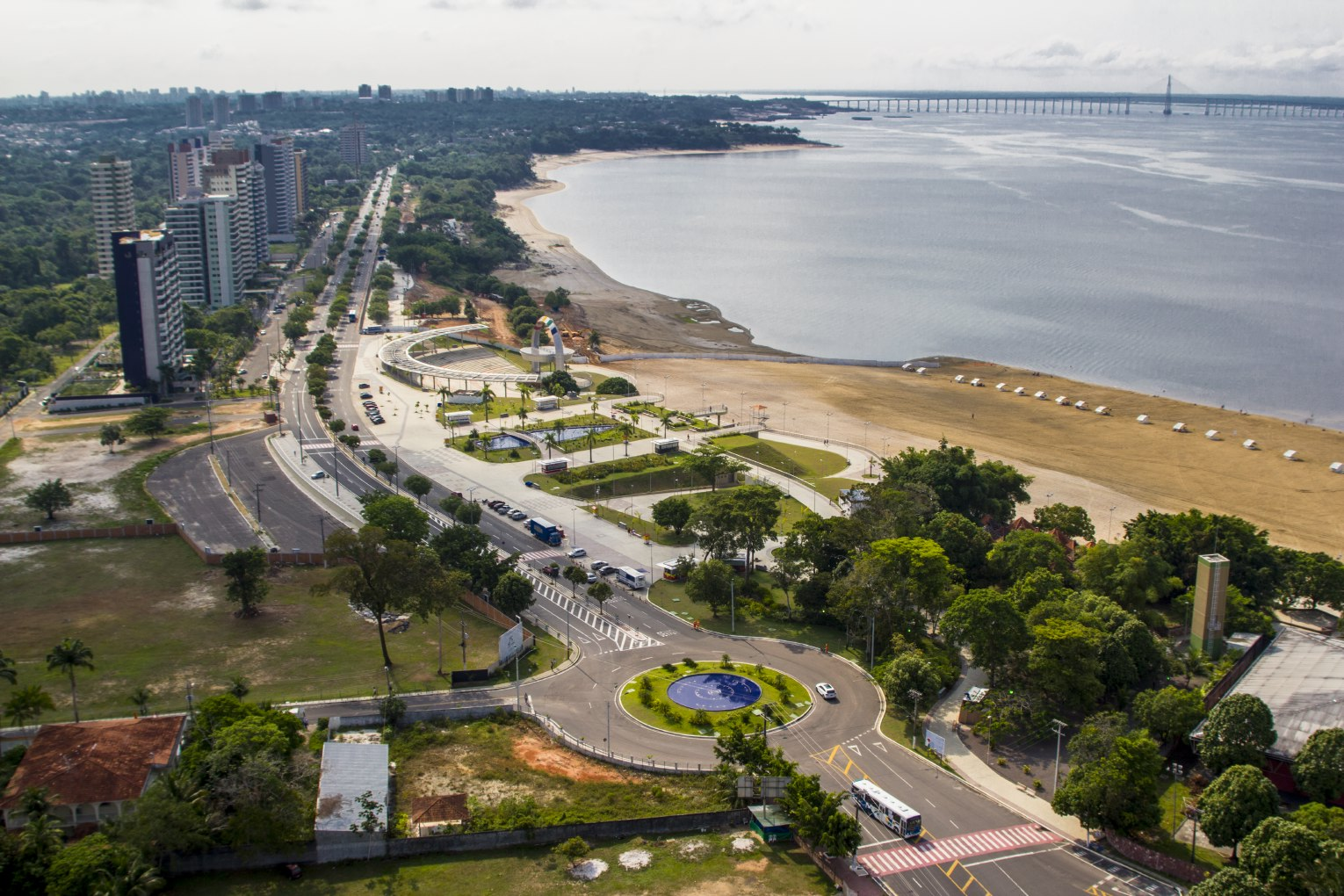
- Skyline with the Rio Negro Amazon Theatre Arena Amazônia Church of Saint Sebastian Rio Negro Bridge Monument Abertura dos Portos Mercado Adolpho Lisboa Ponta Negra

- Flag Coat of arms
- Nicknames: A Paris dos Trópicos (The Paris of the Tropics); Mãe dos Deuses (Mother of the Gods)
- Motto: "A metrópole da Amazônia" (The metropolis of the Amazon)
- Interactive map of Manaus
- Location in Brazil
- Coordinates: 3°07′08″S 60°01′18″W
- Country: Brazil
- Region: North
- State: Amazonas
- Founded: 1669

Government
  - Mayor: David Almeida (Avante)

Area
  - Metropolis: 11,401.092 km^{2} (4,401.986 sq mi)
  - Urban: 427 km^{2} (165 sq mi)
- Elevation: 92 m (302 ft)

Population (2025)
  - Metropolis: 2,303,732 (7th)
  - Density: 181.01/km^{2} (468.8/sq mi)
  - Metro: 2,811,884 (11th)
- Demonym(s): Manauara, Manauense

GDP (PPP, constant 2015 values)
  - Year: 2023
  - Total (Metro): $37.4 billion
  - Per capita: $16,400
- Time zone: UTC−4 (AMT)
- Postal code: 69000-001 to 69099-999 and 69400-000 to 69899-999
- Area code: +55 (92)
- HDI (2010): 0.737 – high
- Website: manaus.am.gov.br

Manaus (Portuguese: [maˈnaws, mɐ-]) is the capital and largest city of the Brazilian state of Amazonas. It is the seventh-largest city in Brazil, with an estimated 2024 population of 2,279,686 distributed over a land area of about 11,401 km^{2} (4,402 sq mi). Located at the east centre of the state, the city is the centre of the Manaus metropolitan area and the largest metropolitan area in the North Region of Brazil by urban landmass. It is situated near the confluence of the Negro and Amazon rivers. It is one of the two cities in the Amazon rainforest with a population of over 1 million people, alongside Belém.

The city was founded in 1669 as the Fort of São José do Rio Negro. It was elevated to a town in 1832 with the name of "Manaus", an altered spelling of the indigenous Manaós peoples, and legally transformed into a city on October 24, 1848, with the name of Cidade da Barra do Rio Negro, Portuguese for "The City of the Margins of the Black River". On September 4, 1856, it returned to the name "Manaus".

Manaus is located in the center of the Amazon rainforest, and home to the National Institute of Amazonian Research, being the most important center for scientific studies in the Amazon region and for international sustainability issues. It was known at the beginning of the century as Heart of the Amazon and City of the Forest. Its main economic engine is the Industrial Park of Manaus, a Free Economic Zone. The city has a free port and an international airport. Its manufactures include electronics, chemical products, and soap; there are distilling and ship construction industries. Manaus exports Brazil nuts, rubber, jute, and rosewood oil. It has a cathedral, the Amazon Theatre opera house, zoological and botanical gardens, an eco-park, and regional and native peoples museums.

The Solimões and Negro rivers meet just east of Manaus and join to form the Amazon River (using the Brazilian definition of the river; elsewhere, Solimões is considered the upper part of the Amazon). Rubber made it the richest city in South America during the late 1800s. Rubber helped Manaus earn its nickname, the Paris of the Tropics. Many wealthy European families settled in Manaus and brought their love for sophisticated European art, architecture, and culture with them. Manaus was one of the twelve Brazilian host cities of the 2014 World Cup, as well as one of the six hosts of football matches at the 2016 Summer Olympics.

== Etymology ==
The name Manaus comes from the native people called Manaós, which means Mother of the Gods.

== History ==
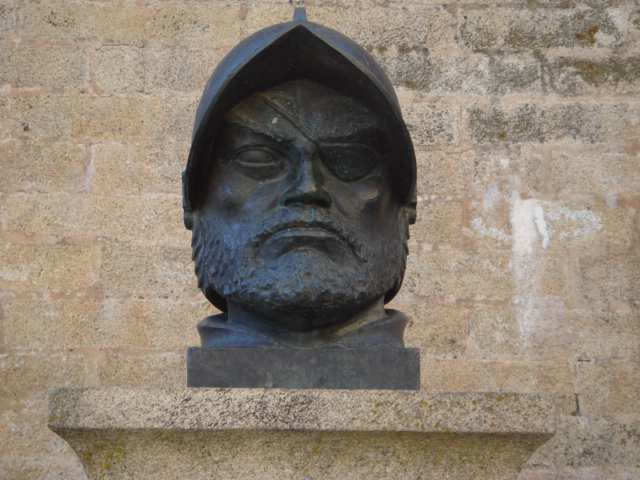
Bust of Francisco de Orellana, the Spaniard who sailed the Amazon River in 1542

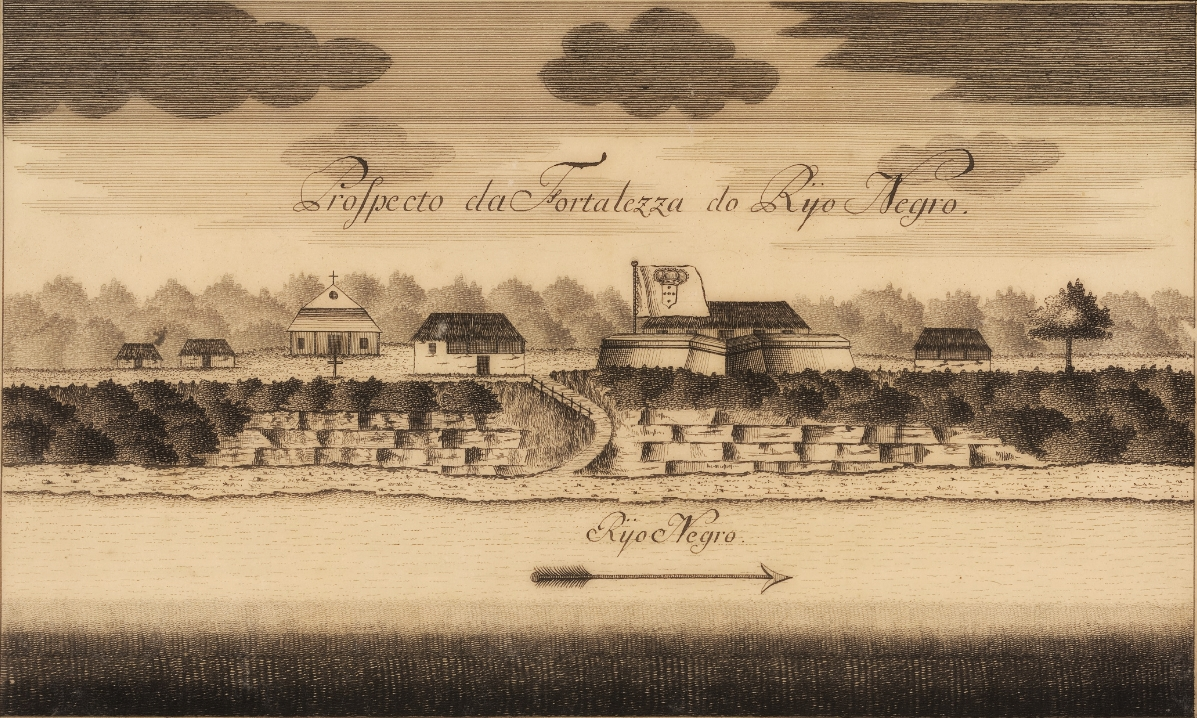
Prospectus of the Rio Negro Fortress, founded in 1669

=== Early settlement of Manaus ===
The history of the European colonization of Manaus began in 1499 with the Spanish arrival at the mouth of the Amazon River. The Spanish then continued to colonize the region north of Brazil. Development continued in 1668–1669 with the building of the Fort of São José da Barra do Rio Negro by the Portuguese in order to ensure its predominance in the region, especially against the Dutch, at that time headquartered in what is today Suriname. The fort was constructed in rock and clay, with four cannons guarding the curtains. It continued to function for more than 100 years. Next to the fort there were many indigenous mestizos, who helped in its construction and began to live in the vicinity.

The population grew so much that, in 1695, the missionaries (Carmelite, Jesuit, Franciscan) built a nearby chapel dedicated to Nossa Senhora da Conceição (Our Lady of the Conception), who, in time, became the patron saint of the city. A Royal Charter of March 3, 1755 created the captaincy of São José do Rio Negro, with capital in Mariuá (now Barcelos), but with the governor, Lobo D'Almada, fearing a Spanish invasion, the seat went back to Lugar de Barra in 1791. Being located at the confluence of the Rio Negro and Amazon Rivers, it was a strategic point. On November 13, 1832, Lugar da Barra was elevated to town status and named Manaus. On October 24, 1848, under Law 145 of the Provincial Assembly of Para, it was renamed the City of Barra do Rio Negro. On September 4, 1856, the governor, Herculano Ferreira Pena, finally gave it the name "Manaus".

=== Cabanagem ===
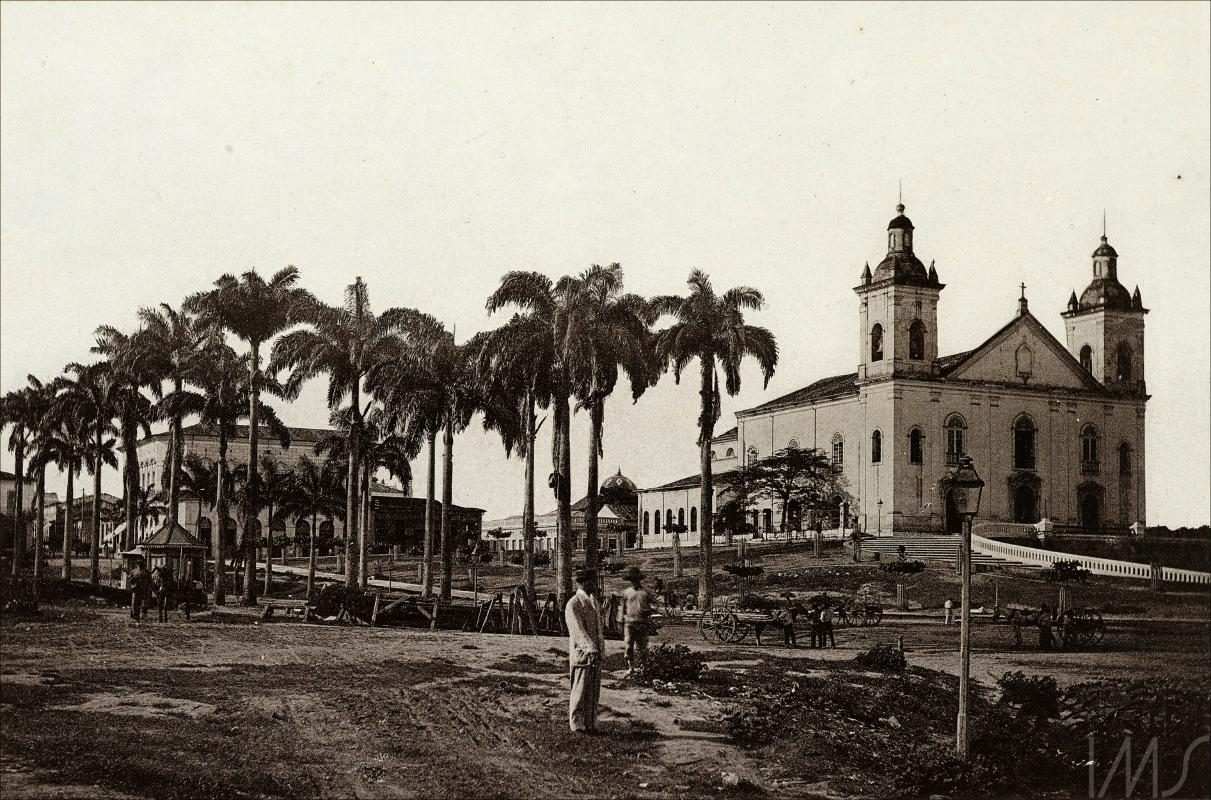
Metropolitan Cathedral, c. 1890

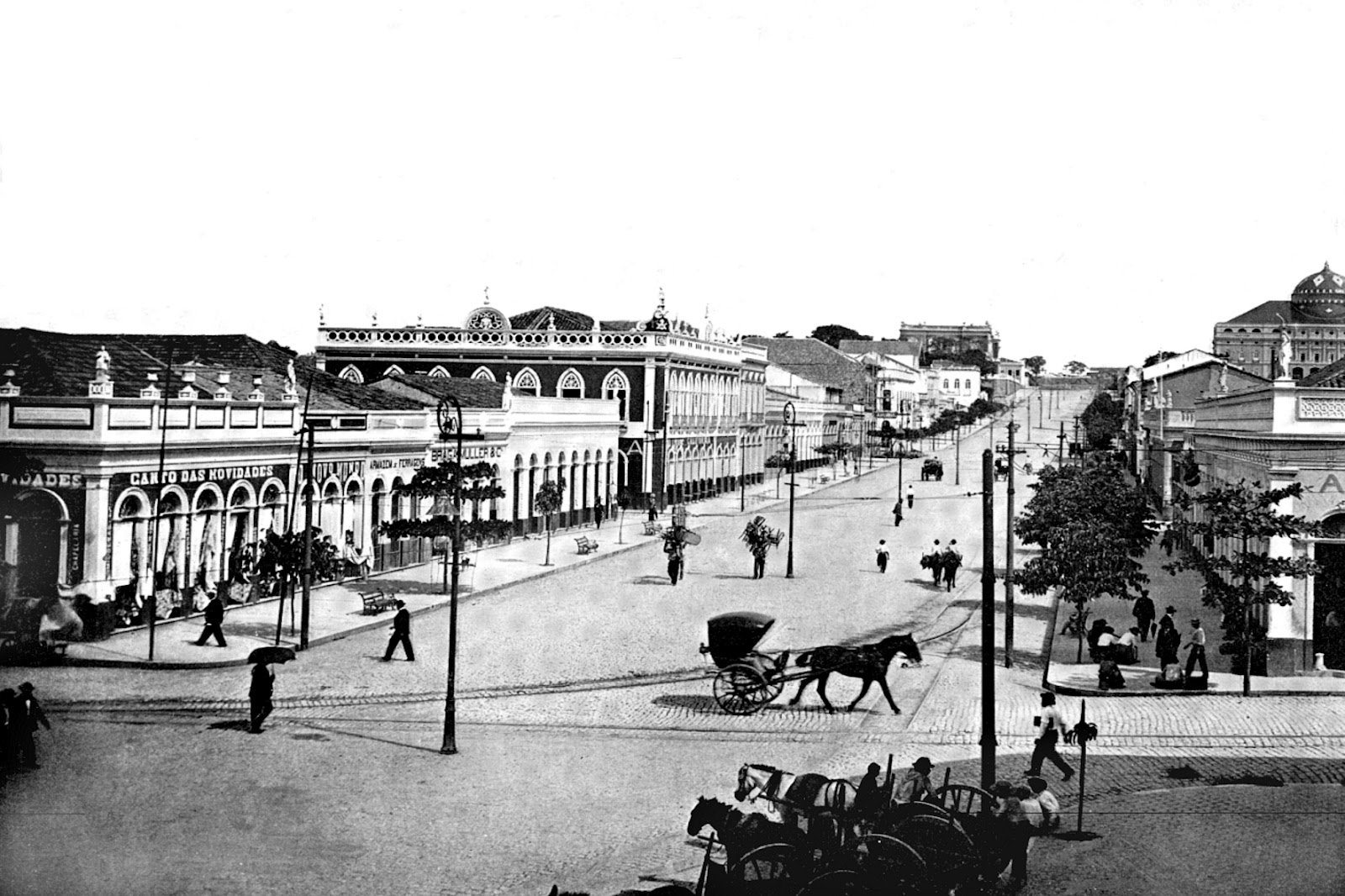
Eduardo Ribeiro Avenue, c. 1901.

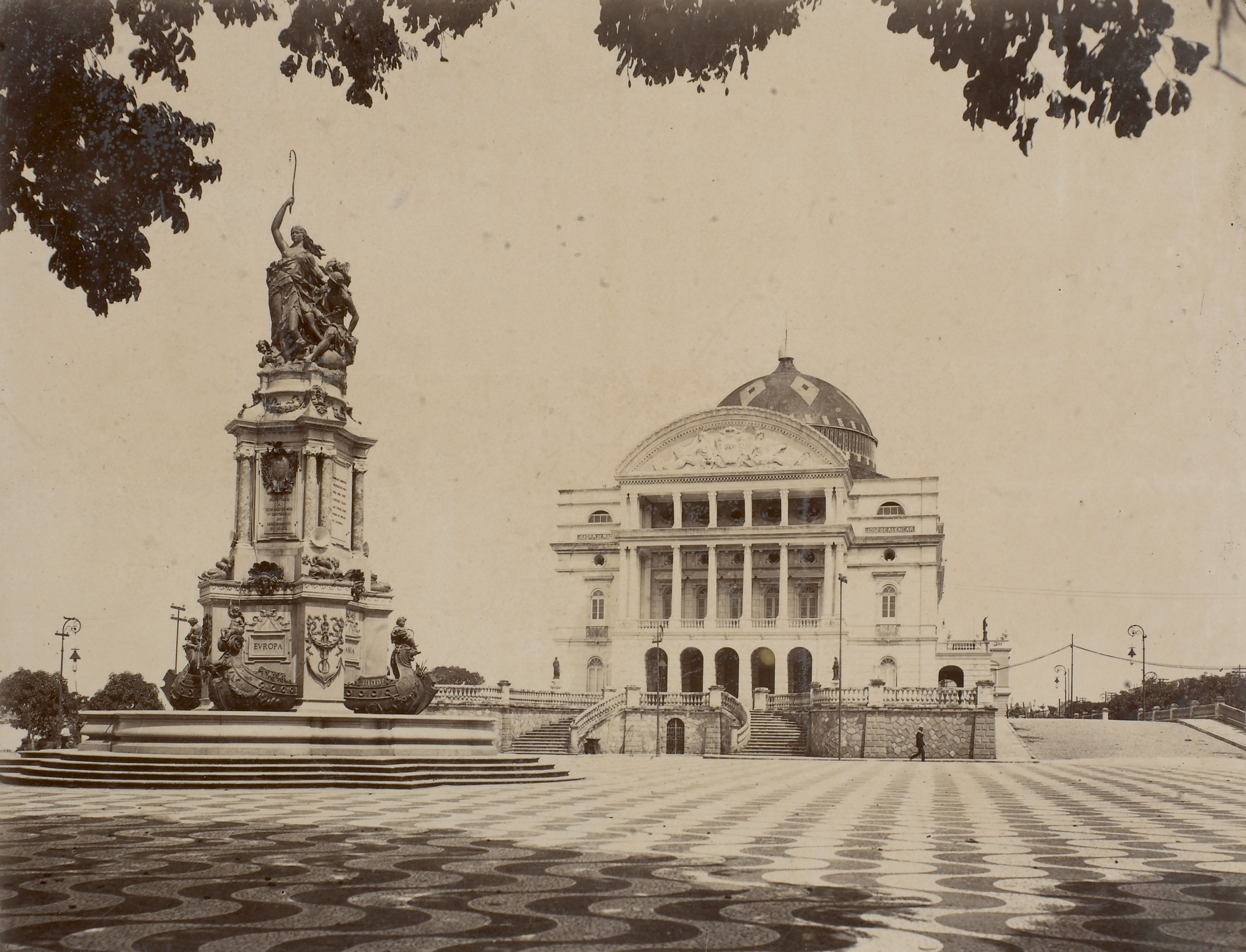
Amazon Theatre, 1906

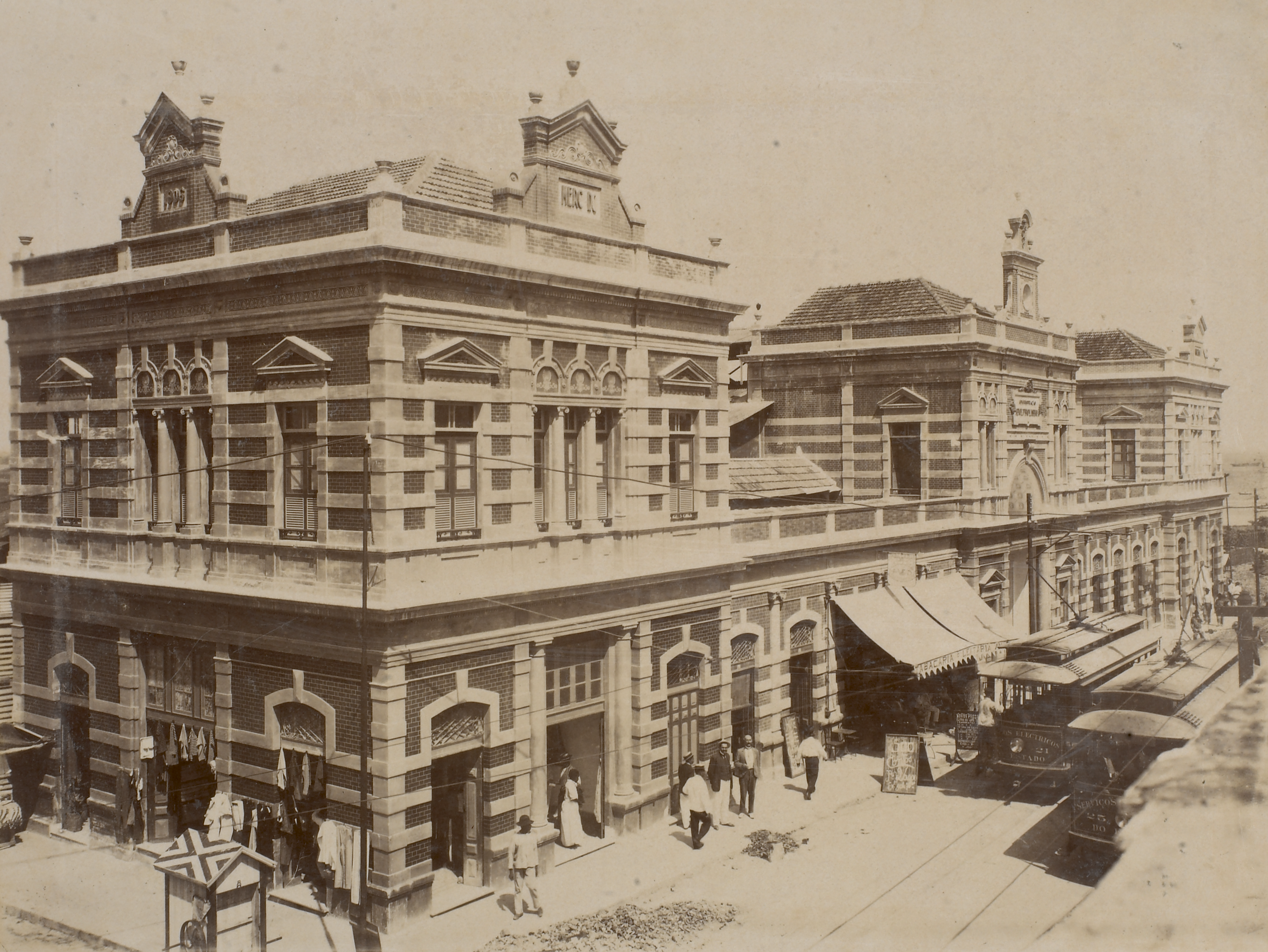
Public Market, 1906

The Cabanagem was the revolt in which blacks, Native Americans, and mestizos fought against the white political elite and took power in 1835. The Cabanagem reduced the population of the then state of Grão-Pará from about 100,000 to 60,000. The involvement of rebels from the Upper Amazon (Manaus today) in what was originally a movement based in Belém was crucial for the birth of the current state of Amazonas. During the brief period of revolution, the Cabanos of the Upper Amazon, bands of rebels, roamed throughout the region, occupying Manaus twice, and, in most settlements, their arrival was greeted by the non-white population spontaneously joining their ranks, leading to a greater number of adherents to the movement. With that there was an integration of people in the region thus forming the state.

=== Rubber boom ===
Manaus was at the center of the Amazon region's rubber boom during the late 19th century. For a time, it was "one of the gaudiest cities of the world". Historian Robin Furneaux wrote of this period, "No extravagance, however absurd, deterred" the rubber barons. "If one rubber baron bought a vast yacht, another would install a tame lion in his villa, and a third would water his horse on champagne." The city built a grand opera house, with vast domes and gilded balconies, and using marble, glass, and crystal, from around Europe. The opera house cost ten million (public-funded) dollars. In one season, half the members of one visiting opera troupe died of yellow fever. The opera house, called the Teatro Amazonas, was effectively closed for most of the 20th Century. However it was used in scenes of the Werner Herzog film Fitzcarraldo (1982). After a gap of almost 90 years, it reopened to produce live opera in 1997 and is now attracting performers from all over the world.

When the seeds of the rubber tree were smuggled out of the Amazon region to be cultivated on plantations in Southeast Asia, (Note: For an account, see The Thief at the End of the World: Rubber, Power, and the Seeds of Empire, by Joe Jackson.) Brazil and Peru lost their monopoly on the product. The rubber boom ended abruptly, many people left its major cities, and Manaus fell into poverty. The rubber boom had made possible electrification of the city before it was installed in many European cities, but the end of the rubber boom made the generators too expensive to run. The city was not able to generate electricity again for years.

=== Free zone ===
In the 1960s during the establishment of the military dictatorship in Brazil, the newly installed government concerned about the "demographic gap in Brazil", began to introduce numerous projects in the interior of the country, especially in the Amazon region, with the introduction of the Manaus free trade zone in 1967, and with the opening of new roads within the region, the city had a wide period of investments in financial and economic capital, both national and international, attracted by the tax incentives granted by the free zone, in this period, Manaus had enormous demographic growth becoming one of the most populous cities in Brazil.

=== Recent events ===
Manaus was one of the host cities of the 2014 FIFA World Cup and one of the seats of some Olympic football games. It was the only host city in the Amazon rainforest and the most geographically isolated, being further north and west than any of the other host cities. A massive prison riot occurred in January 2017, having begun in Manaus and later spreading to two additional cities in Brazil, thus unleashing security problems within the country.

During the COVID-19 pandemic in Brazil, an estimated 76% of the population of Manaus was infected with coronavirus, and the possibility of herd immunity was discussed. However, a second outbreak infected people in Manaus, this time with the Lineage B.1.1.248 variant starting in early January 2021.

== Geography ==
Location in the state of Amazonas

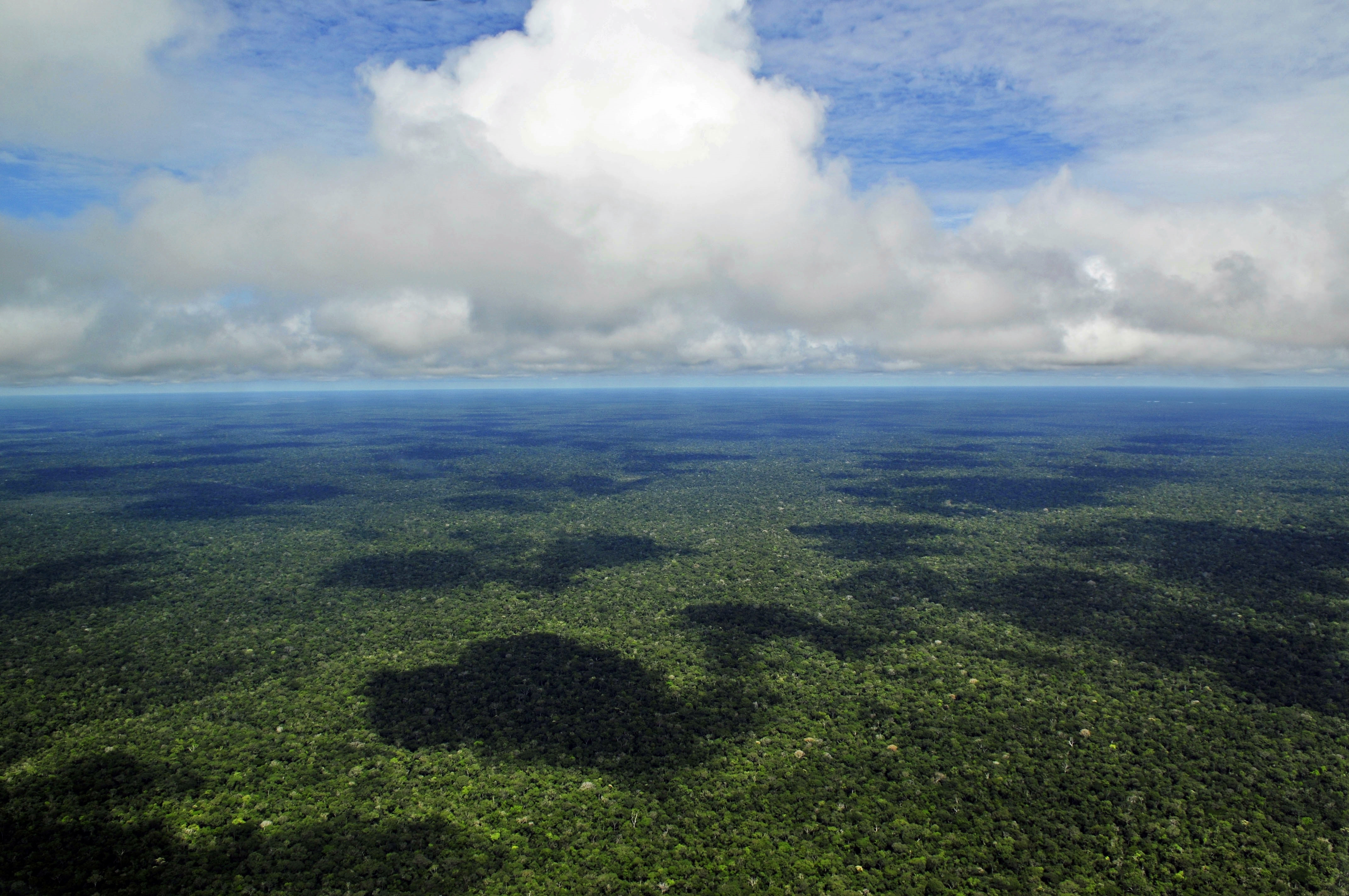
Aerial view of the Amazon rainforest, near Manaus

The largest city in northern Brazil, Manaus occupies an area of 11,401 square kilometres (4,402 sq mi), with a density of 158.06 inhabitants per square kilometre (409.4/sq mi). It is the neighboring city of Presidente Figueiredo, Careiro, Iranduba, Rio Preto da Eva, Itacoatiara, and Novo Airão.

=== Vegetation ===
Manaus is located in the middle of the Amazon Rainforest. The Amazon represents over half of the planet's remaining rainforests and comprises the largest and most species-rich tract of tropical rainforest in the world. Wet tropical forests are the most species-rich biome, and tropical forests in the Americas are consistently more species-rich than the wet forests in Africa and Asia. As the largest tract of tropical rainforest in the Americas, the Amazonian rainforests have unparalleled biodiversity. More than one-third of all species in the world live in the Amazon rainforest.

=== Green areas ===
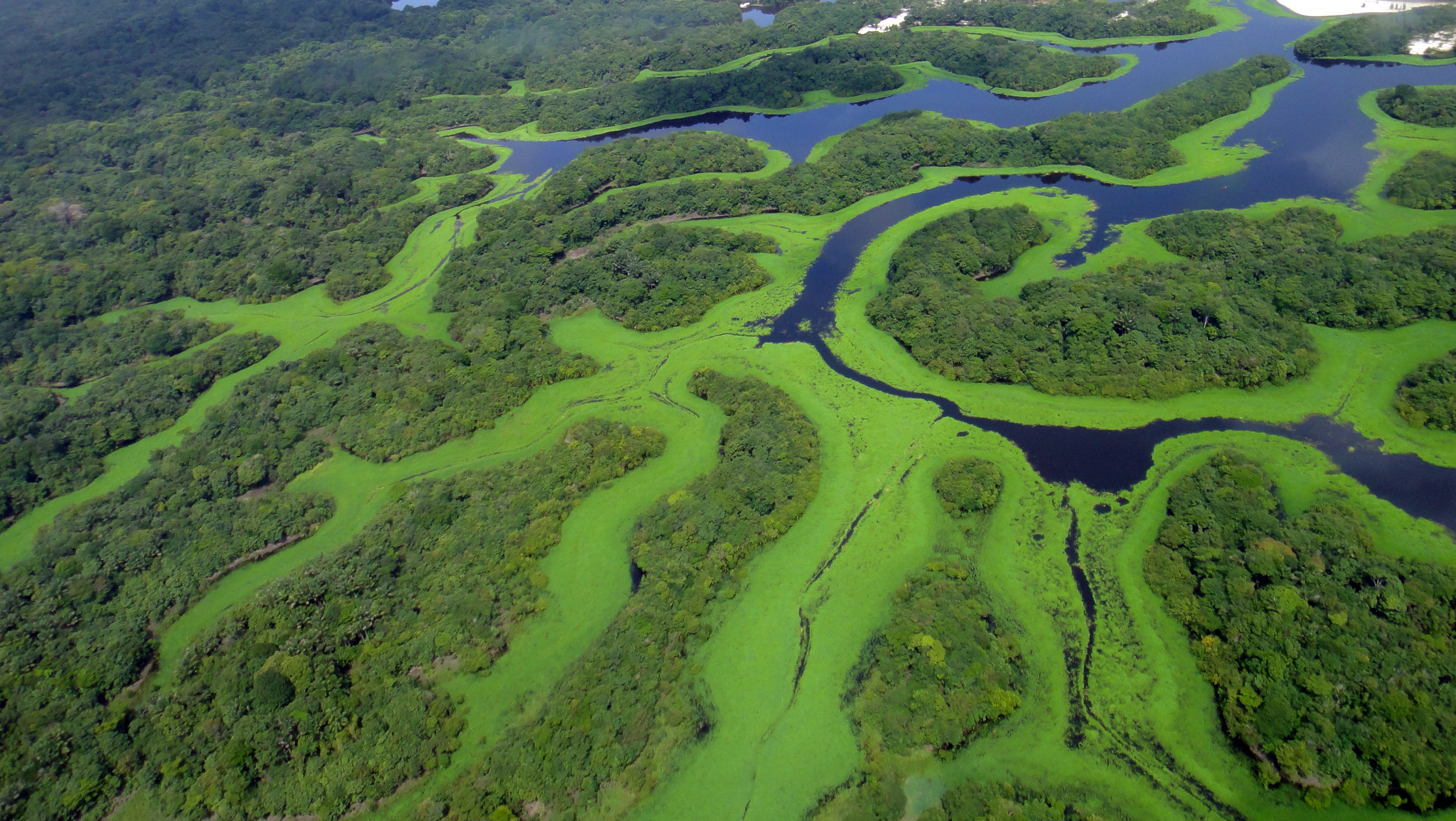
Anavilhanas National Park.

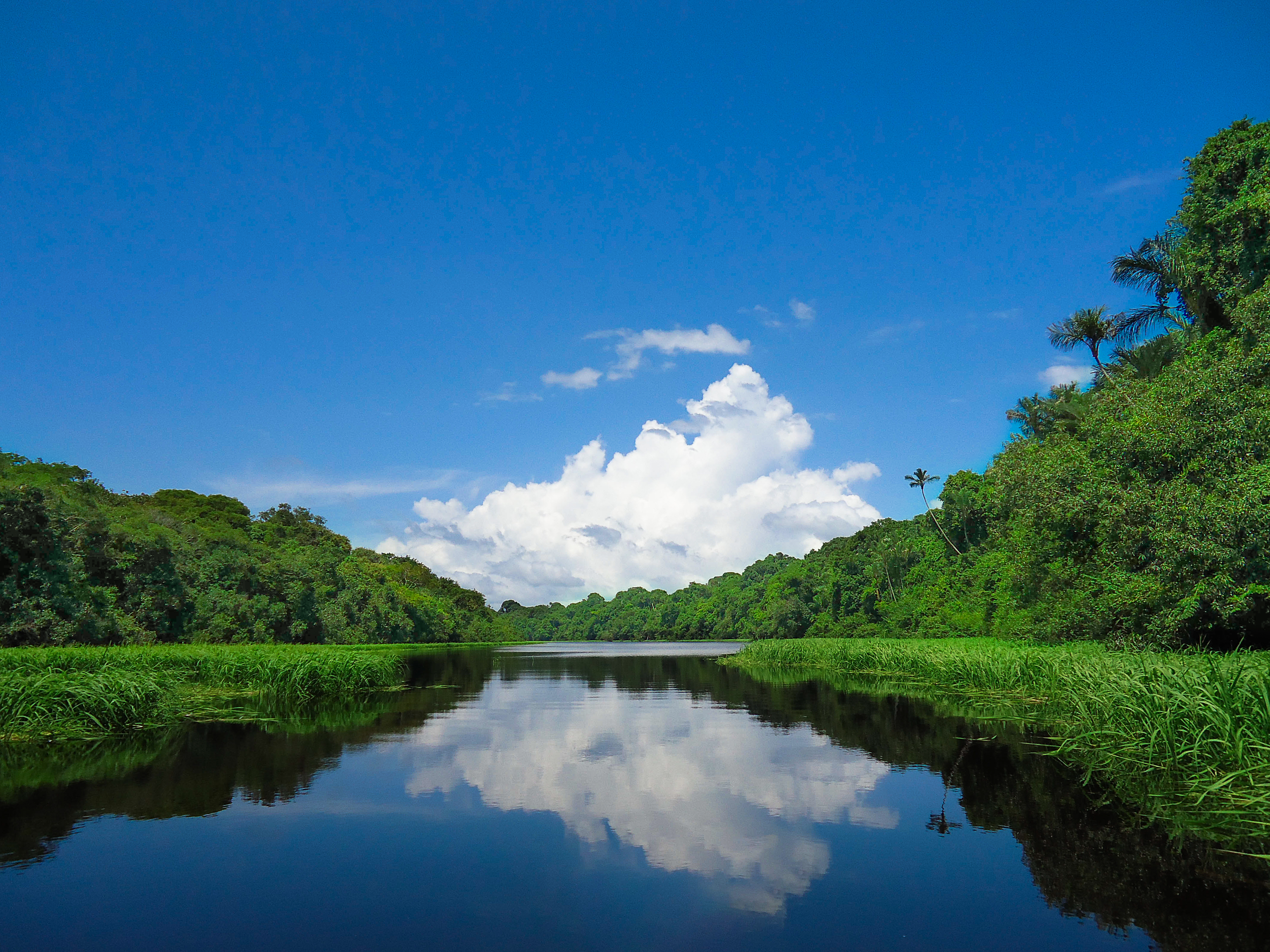
Anavilhas National Park ground view.

Despite being located in the Amazon, Manaus is densely developed and has few green areas in the city. The largest green areas are:

- Mindu Park, located in the center-south of the city, the district Park 10. The Park of Mindú, established in 1989, is one of the largest and most visited parks in the city.
- Bilhares Park, established in 2005, located in the south-central region of Manaus, in the neighborhood of Planalto ("plateau").
- Area of the green hill of Aleixo, created in the 1980s, located in the east of the city and is one of the largest urban green areas.
- Sumaúma State Park, a state park located in the north of Manaus, in the New Town district. It is the smallest state park of the Brazilian Amazon Basin.
- Castanheiras Pied Tamarin Wildlife Refuge, a 95-hectare (230-acre) refuge created in 1982 to protect a population of endangered pied tamarins.
- Adolfo Ducke Forest Reserve, a biological reserve established in 1963, and covers an area of 100 square kilometres (10,000 hectares, 39 square miles). The Reserve is managed by INPA (Instituto Nacional de Pesquisas da Amazonia—National Institute for Amazon Research).
- Part of the Anavilhanas National Park, a 350,018-hectare (864,910-acre) conservation unit that was originally an ecological station created in 1981.
- About 75% of the Rio Negro Left Bank Environmental Protection Area, a 611,008-hectare (1,509,830-acre) sustainable use conservation area created in 1995.
- The 11,930-hectare (29,500-acre) Tupé Sustainable Development Reserve, created in 2005, about 25 kilometres (16 mi) west of the city.
- The 86,601-hectare (214,000-acre) Rio Negro State Park South Section, created in 1995, about 40 kilometres (25 mi) by boat to the northwest of the city.

=== Climate ===
Manaus has a tropical monsoon climate (Am) according to the Köppen climate classification system, just dry enough in its driest month to not be a tropical rainforest climate, with the average annual compensated temperature of 27.4 °C (81.3 °F) and high air humidity, with a rainfall index around 2,300 mm (90.6 in) annually. The seasons are relatively well-defined concerning rain: July to September is relatively dry, and December to May (summer and autumn) is very rainy. Summer and autumn are colder than winter and spring (June to November). Thunderstorms are frequent every day in the summer (December to February), but they can occur at any time of the year. There have been occasional occurrences of hail in the city.

Due to the city's proximity to the equator, the heat is constant in the local climate. There are no cold days in winter (June to August); instead, winter is hotter than summer. Periodically, very intense polar air masses occur in the South-Central part of Brazil and in the southwest of the Amazon, and have some effect on the city, as occurred in August 1955. But although they are rare, they influence the climate, causing the temperature to drop to 18 °C (64.4 °F) or below. The proximity to the forest usually avoids extremes of heat and makes the city wet.

According to the National Institute of Meteorology (INMET), the highest temperature registered in the city was 39 °C (102.2 °F) in 2015, and the lowest was 12 °C (53.6 °F) in 1989.

On November 26, 2009, a case of acid rain was recorded in Manaus. Air pollution, caused in large part by the accumulation of smoke from burning, associated with the sulfur dioxide emitted by cars, was the cause of this phenomenon. Although the incidence of acid rain is common in some Brazilian capitals where there is a great concentration of cars, in Manaus (and other cities of the Amazonas) the situation is aggravated by the prolonged period of drought with the smoke from forest fires.

Climate data for Manaus (1991–2020 normals, extremes 1872–present)
Month	Jan	Feb	Mar	Apr	May	Jun	Jul	Aug	Sep	Oct	Nov	Dec	Year
Record high °C (°F)	37.0 (98.6)	37.8 (100.0)	36.2 (97.2)	35.4 (95.7)	34.7 (94.5)	34.9 (94.8)	35.7 (96.3)	37.6 (99.7)	38.3 (100.9)	38.1 (100.6)	38.2 (100.8)	37.3 (99.1)	38.3 (100.9)
Mean daily maximum °C (°F)	31.3 (88.3)	31.1 (88.0)	31.2 (88.2)	31.3 (88.3)	31.5 (88.7)	31.9 (89.4)	32.5 (90.5)	33.6 (92.5)	34.1 (93.4)	34.0 (93.2)	33.0 (91.4)	32.0 (89.6)	32.3 (90.1)
Daily mean °C (°F)	26.6 (79.9)	26.6 (79.9)	26.6 (79.9)	26.7 (80.1)	27.0 (80.6)	27.3 (81.1)	27.5 (81.5)	28.2 (82.8)	28.6 (83.5)	28.5 (83.3)	28.0 (82.4)	27.2 (81.0)	27.4 (81.3)
Mean daily minimum °C (°F)	23.6 (74.5)	23.6 (74.5)	23.7 (74.7)	23.7 (74.7)	23.9 (75.0)	23.8 (74.8)	23.7 (74.7)	24.1 (75.4)	24.5 (76.1)	24.6 (76.3)	24.4 (75.9)	24.0 (75.2)	24.0 (75.1)
Record low °C (°F)	18.5 (65.3)	18.0 (64.4)	19.0 (66.2)	18.5 (65.3)	14.3 (57.7)	17.0 (62.6)	12.1 (53.8)	18.0 (64.4)	20.0 (68.0)	19.4 (66.9)	18.3 (64.9)	19.0 (66.2)	12.1 (53.8)
Average precipitation mm (inches)	305.6 (12.03)	296.8 (11.69)	320.9 (12.63)	331.0 (13.03)	233.3 (9.19)	117.2 (4.61)	67.1 (2.64)	56.1 (2.21)	79.0 (3.11)	113.9 (4.48)	188.0 (7.40)	253.5 (9.98)	2,362.4 (93)
Average precipitation days (≥ 1 mm)	18.7	17.6	19	17.5	15.5	10.4	6.8	5.7	6.1	8.3	10.3	15.3	151.2
Average relative humidity (%)	84.8	85.1	85.8	85.6	84.4	80.8	77.4	74.6	74.6	76.1	79.3	83.0	81.0
Average dew point °C (°F)	24.6 (76.3)	24.4 (75.9)	24.6 (76.3)	24.8 (76.6)	24.8 (76.6)	24.4 (75.9)	23.2 (73.8)	24.1 (75.4)	24.4 (75.9)	24.6 (76.3)	24.7 (76.5)	24.6 (76.3)	24.4 (76.0)
Mean monthly sunshine hours	122.7	98.0	104.3	113.6	141.9	191.0	223.1	222.5	196.4	173.5	150.7	126.6	1,864.3
Mean daily daylight hours	12.3	12.2	12.1	12.0	12.0	11.9	12.0	12.0	12.1	12.2	12.3	12.3	12.1
Average ultraviolet index	12	12	12	12	12	11	10	12	12	12	12	12	12
Source 1: Instituto Nacional de Meteorologia
Source 2: Meteo Climat (record highs and lows) NOAA Weather atlas(Daylight-UV)

== Hydrology ==
The urban area covers all or part of four river basins, all tributaries of the Rio Negro. The São Raimundo and Educandos streams are completely contained in the city. The Tarumã Açu forms the western boundary of the city in its lower reaches, and is fed by several tributaries that originate in the Ducke Reserve and run through the north and west of the city. The Puraquequara forms the east boundary of the urban area in its lower section.

== Demographics ==
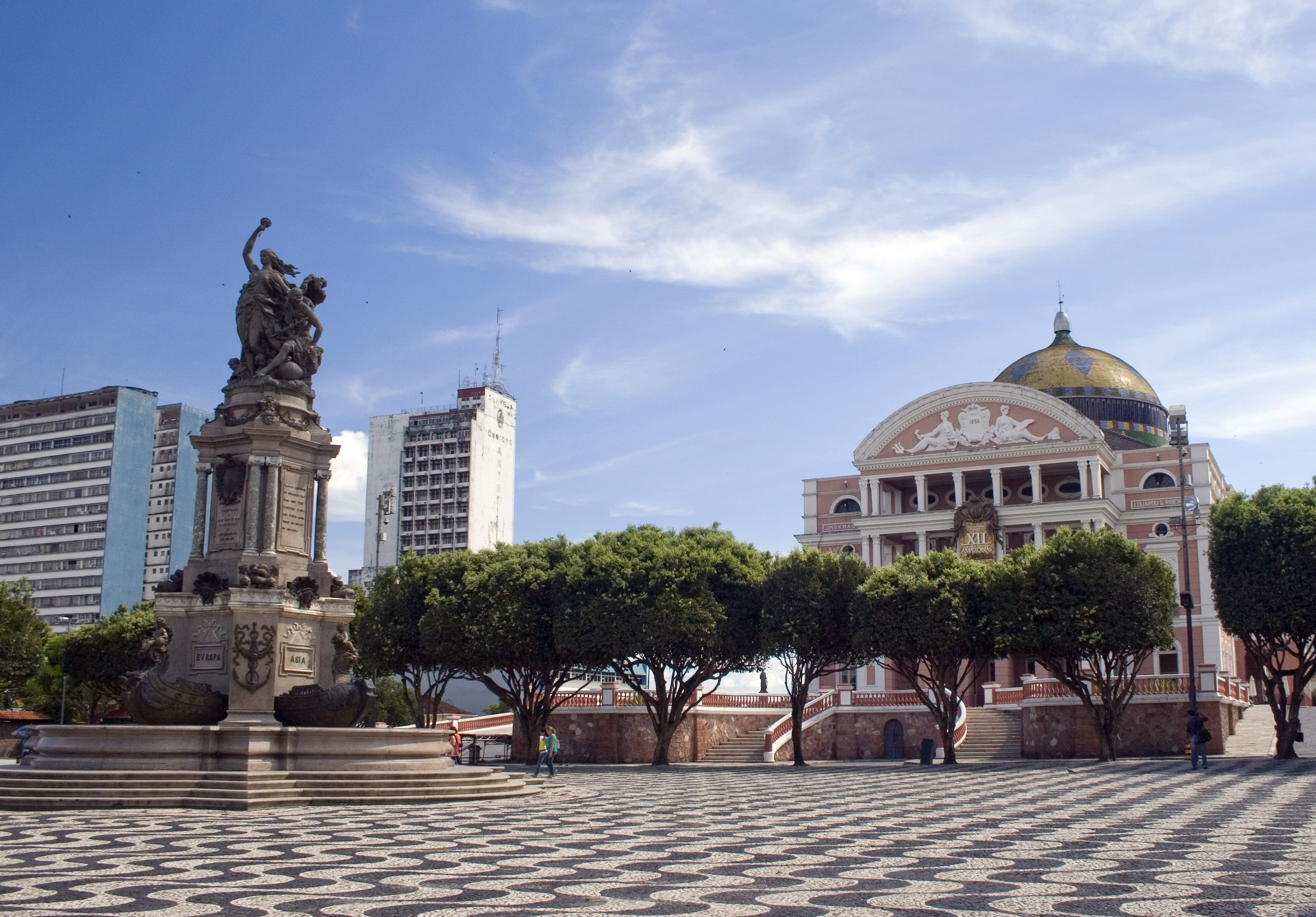
São Sebastião square

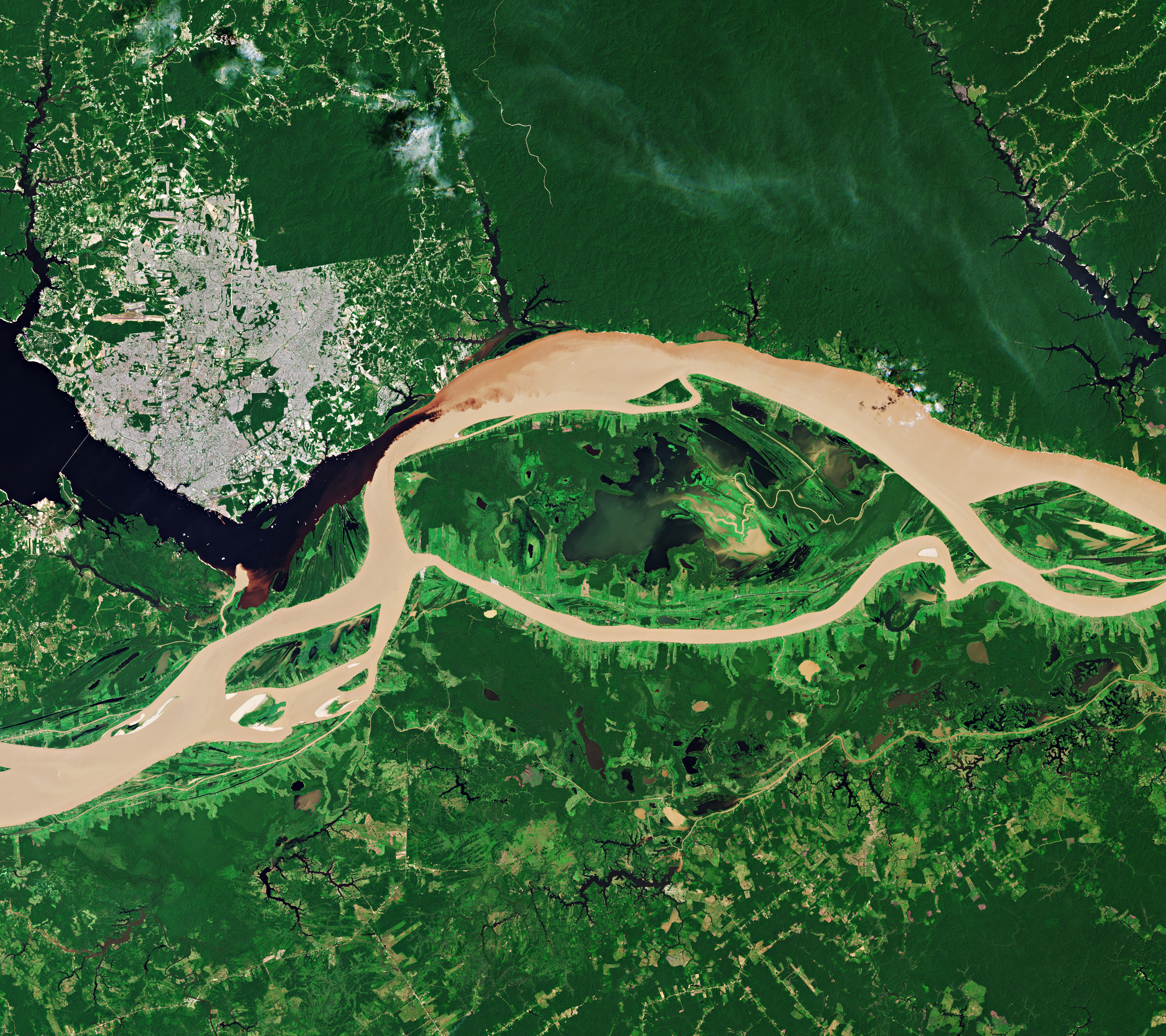
Manaus region seen from space in 2018.

According to the IBGE in 2019, there were 2,182,763 people residing in the city, and 2,676,936 people in the Metropolitan Region of Manaus. The population density of Manaus was 191.45 inhabitants per square kilometre (495.9/sq mi).

Racial composition	2022
Mixed	69.6%
White	23.7%
Black	5.6%
Amerindian	0.9%
Asian	0.2%

- Total population: 2,145,444 inhabitants (87% urban, 13% rural, 52.07% women and 47.93% men)
- Population density: 158.06 inhabitants per square kilometre (409.4/sq mi)

Manaus is the seventh largest city in Brazil, after São Paulo, Rio de Janeiro, Salvador, Brasília, Fortaleza and Belo Horizonte.

The city's population growth is above the national average, and 10% above the average for the capital (Brasilia). Most of the population is located in the North and East regions of the city, and the New Town (northern area) the neighborhood is the most populous, with more than 260,000 residents.

According to the results of the last census, the city's population increased from 343,038 inhabitants in 1960 to 622,733 in 1970. By 1990, the population grew to 1,025,979 inhabitants, increasing its density to 90 inhabitants per square kilometre (230/sq mi).

According to a 2013 genetic study, the ancestry of the inhabitants of Manaus is 45.9% European, 37.8% Native American, and 16.3% African.

=== Religion ===
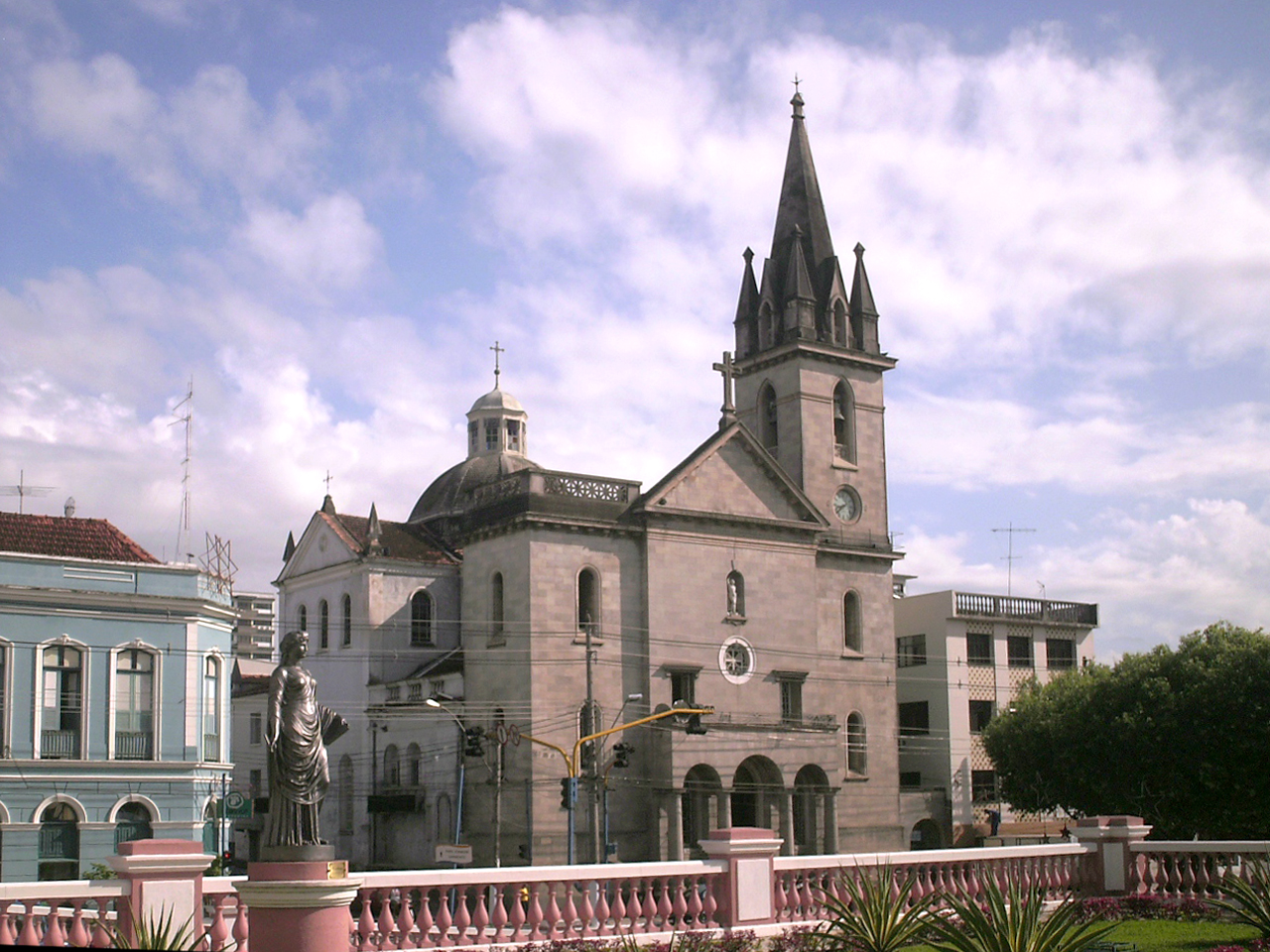
St. Sebastian Church

The city has been influenced by Catholicism since the time of European colonialism, and the majority of Manauenses are Catholic—there are nevertheless dozens of different Protestant denominations in the city. Judaism, Candomblé, Islam, and spiritualism, among others, are also practised. There is a community of Amazonian Jews in Manaus. The city's Catedral Metropolitana Nossa Senhora da Conceição is the seat of the Roman Catholic Archdiocese of Manaus.

The city has a very diverse presence of Protestant or Reformed faiths, such as the Presbyterian Church, Calvary Chapel, For Christ International Church of Grace of God, Pentecostal Church of God in Brazil, Methodist Church, the Anglican Episcopal Church, the Baptist Church, an Assembly of God Church, the Seventh-day Adventist Church, the Universal Church of the Kingdom of God, and the Jehovah's Witnesses among others. These churches are experiencing considerable growth, mainly in the outskirts of the city. The Church of Jesus Christ of Latter-day Saints also has a large presence, with a LDS temple having been built in the city, the sixth in Brazil.

Religion	Percentage	Number
Catholic	44.38%	772,057
Protestant	39.49%	686,969
No religion	8.85%	153,902
Other	5.98%	104,004
Spiritist	2.40%	10,898
Umbanda and Candomblé	0.53%	9,276
Unknown	0.08%	1,437
Undeclared	0.05%	829
Indigenous religion	0.02%	381

Source: IBGE 2022.

== Districts and regions ==
=== Metropolitan region ===
The Metropolitan Region of Manaus (RMM) is a metropolitan area that comprises eight cities of the Amazonas state, but without conurbation.

=== Regions ===
Manaus is divided into seven regions: North, Southern, Central-South, East, West, Mid-West, and Rural area. The eastern region of the city is the most populated, with approximately 600,000 inhabitants (2007). The northern region of the city has had the highest rate of population growth in recent years, and has the largest neighborhood of the city, the Nova Cidade neighborhood. The Center-South region has the highest per capita income. The Eastern Zone is known for having a large number of hills.

=== Neighborhoods ===
The first neighborhood (bairro) established in Manaus was Educandos. From there, other areas of the city began to be occupied since the arrival of migrants from other regions of Brazil.

Bairro de Educandos from the Rio Negro

Manaus has the largest neighborhood in Latin America, the neighborhood of Cidade Nova, which has 264,449 inhabitants, but it is estimated that the population exceeds 300,000 inhabitants. Cidade Nova is larger than all the cities inside the rest of Amazonas state. With the permanence and the strengthening of Free Economic Zone of Manaus, the city began to receive investments and constant migration of people from many parts of the state and northern Brazil.

The wealthiest neighborhood in Manaus is Adrianópolis, located in the Central-South Area of the city. Downtown Manaus is located in the Southern area of the city, next to Rio Negro River. After years of development, the historical center has been neglected by the authorities and it has become an area mostly for commerce and poor housing. There is a plan to restore the city centre to its former glory by removing beggars and irregular sellers from sidewalks and by doing that provide more safety for tourists and locals who are trying to walk in the historical areas of the city. All these plans were prompted by the 2014 World Cup.

== Economy ==
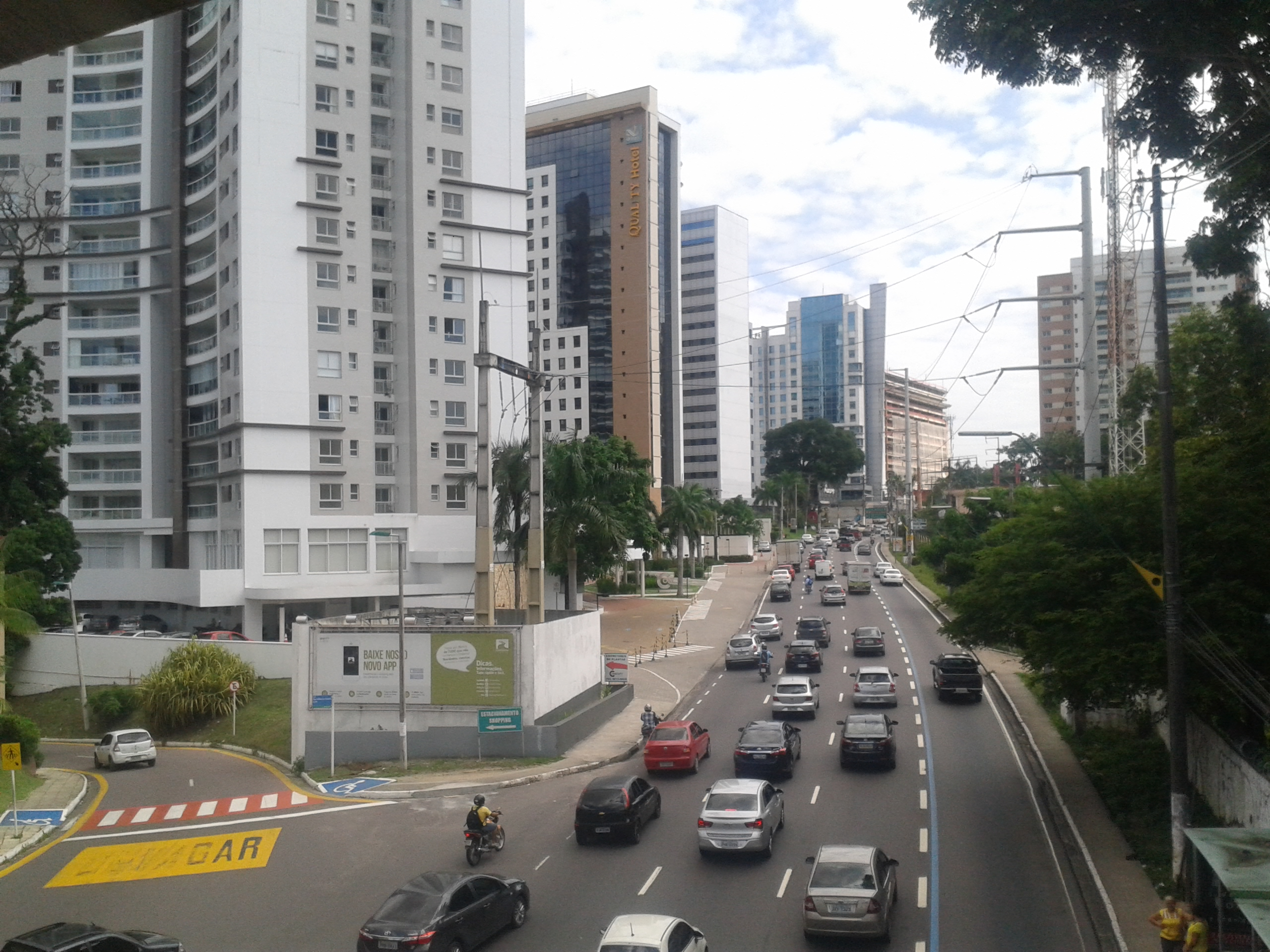
Mario Ypiranga Avenue

Manaus is the sixth-largest economy in Brazil. According to IBGE in 2014, its GDP was R$67,5 billion. The per capita income for the city was R$33,446. Although the main industry of Manaus through much of the 20th century was rubber, its importance has declined. Given its location, fish, wild fruits like Açaí and Cupuaçu, and Brazil nuts initiate important trades, as do petroleum refining, soap manufacturing, and chemical industries. Over the last decades, a system of federal investments and tax incentives has turned the surrounding region into a major industrial center (the Free Economic Zone of Manaus).

The mobile phone companies LG, Nokia, Samsung, Siemens, Sagem, Gradiente, and BenQ-Siemens operate mobile phone manufacturing plants in Manaus. Plastic lens manufacturer Essilor also has a plant here. The Brazilian sport utility vehicle manufacturer Amazon Veiculos is headquartered in Manaus. Two airlines, MAP Linhas Aéreas and Manaus Aerotáxi, have headquarters on the grounds of Eduardo Gomes International Airport in Manaus.

=== Free Trade Zone ===
The initial idea of a Free Trade Port in Manaus came from Deputy Francisco Pereira da Silva and was subsequently formalized by Law No. 3.173 on June 6, 1957. The project was approved by the National Congress on October 23, 1951, under No. 1.310 and regulated by Decree No. 47.757 on February 2, 1960. It was then amended by rapporteur Maurício Jopper, an engineer, who by agreement with the original author, justified the creation of a Free Trade Zone instead of a Free Trade Port.

For the first ten years, the ZFM (Manaus Free Trade Zone) was located in a warehouse rented from Manaus Harbour, in the Port of Manaus, and relied on federal funds. It was perhaps due to this lack of its own resources that there was little credibility in the project. On February 28, 1967, President Castelo Branco signed Decree-Law No. 288, which redefined the Manaus Free Trade Zone in more concrete terms. The new Decree-Law stipulated that the Manaus Free Trade Zone would have a radius of 10 km (6.2 mi) with an industrial center as well as an agricultural center and that these would be given the economic means to allow for regional development in order to lift the Amazon out of the economic isolation that it had fallen into at that time.

On August 28, 1967, the Manaus Free Trade Zone Authority, SUBFRAME, was created. SUBFRAME is an independent body with its own legal status and assets and has financial and administrative autonomy. Tax incentives and the subsequent complementary legislation created comparative advantages in the region with respect to other parts of the country and as a result the Manaus Free Trade Zone attracted new investment to the area. These incentives constituted tax exemptions administered federally by SUBFRAME and SUDAM.

== Government and politics ==
The current elected Mayor of Manuas is David Almeida and he will hold this position until 31st December 2028.

There are many prisons in Manaus, including Anisio Jobim Penitentiary Complex. Forty prisoners were found dead at four different prisons in Manaus.

== Education, science and technology ==
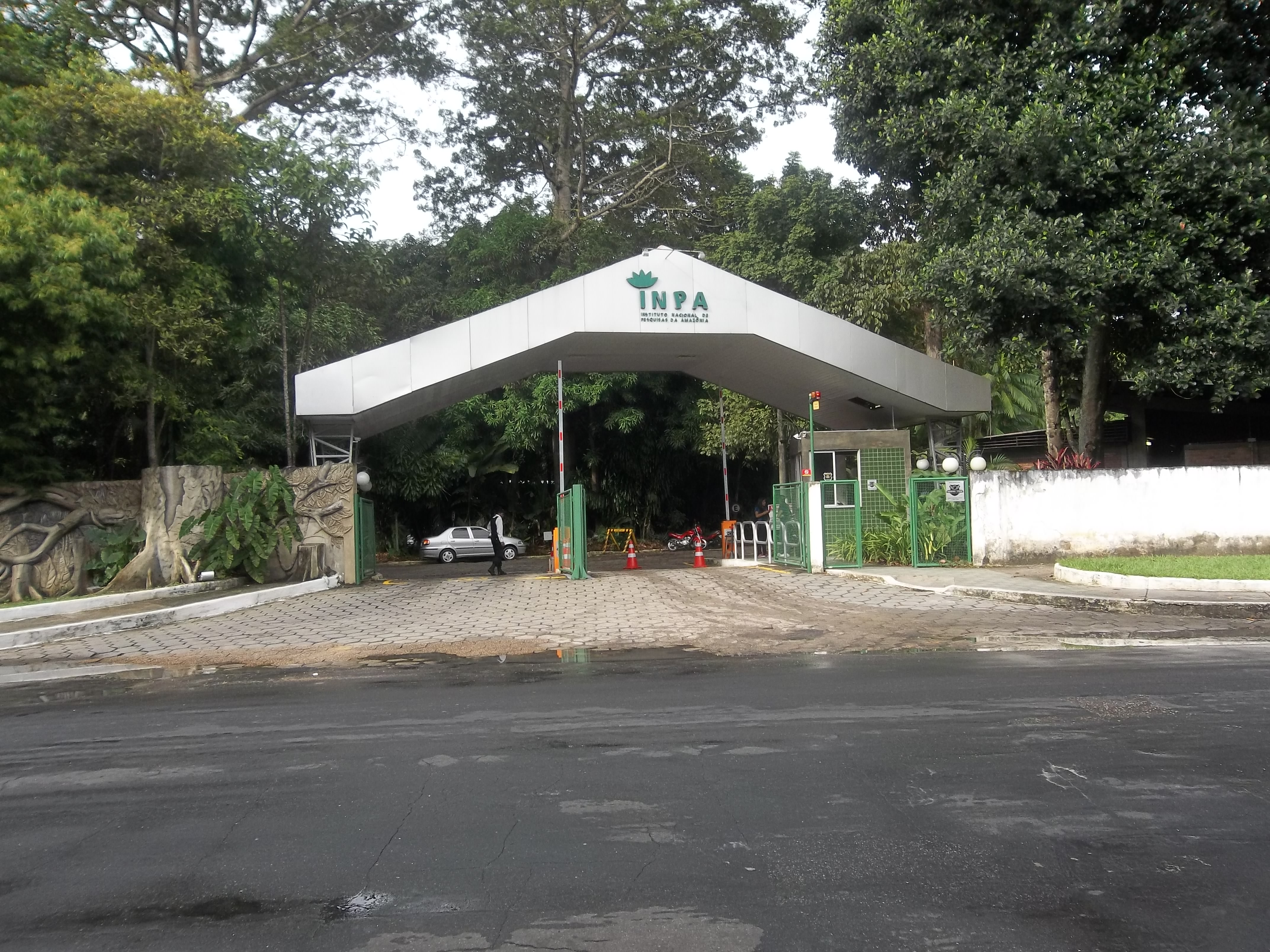
National Institute of Amazonian Research

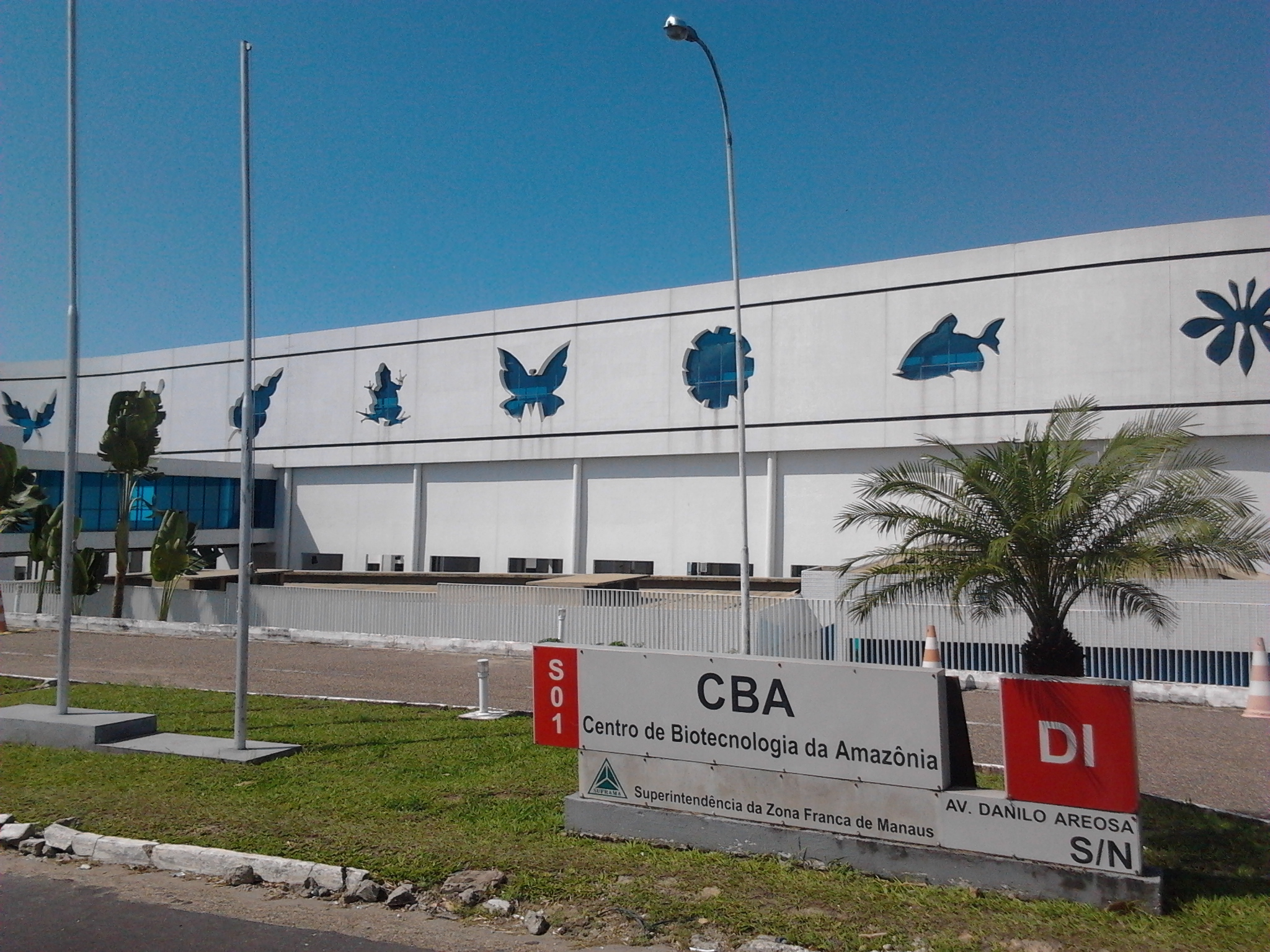
Amazon Biotechnology Center

Manaus has research centers, technology and public and private universities.

- Federal University of Amazonas—Universidade Federal do Amazonas;
- University of the State of Amazonas—Universidade do Estado do Amazonas;
- National Institute of Amazonian Research—Instituto Nacional de Pesquisas da Amazônia;
- Sidia Institute of Science and Technology —Sidia Instituto de Ciência e Tecnologia;
- Federal Institute of Education, Science and Technology—Instituto Federal de Educação, Ciência e Tecnologia do Amazonas;
- Centro Universitário do Norte—UNINORTE;
- Lutheran University of Brazil—Universidade Luterana do Brasil;
- Centro de Educação Integrada Martha Falcão;
- Unilasalle—Faculdade La Salle;
- Universidade Nilton Lins;
- Centro Universitário de Educação Superior do Amazonas—CIESA;
- Escola Superior Batista do Amazonas;
- Faculdade Boas Novas;
- Faculdade Metropolitana de Manaus;
- Universidade Paulista.

== Transportation ==
=== Airports ===
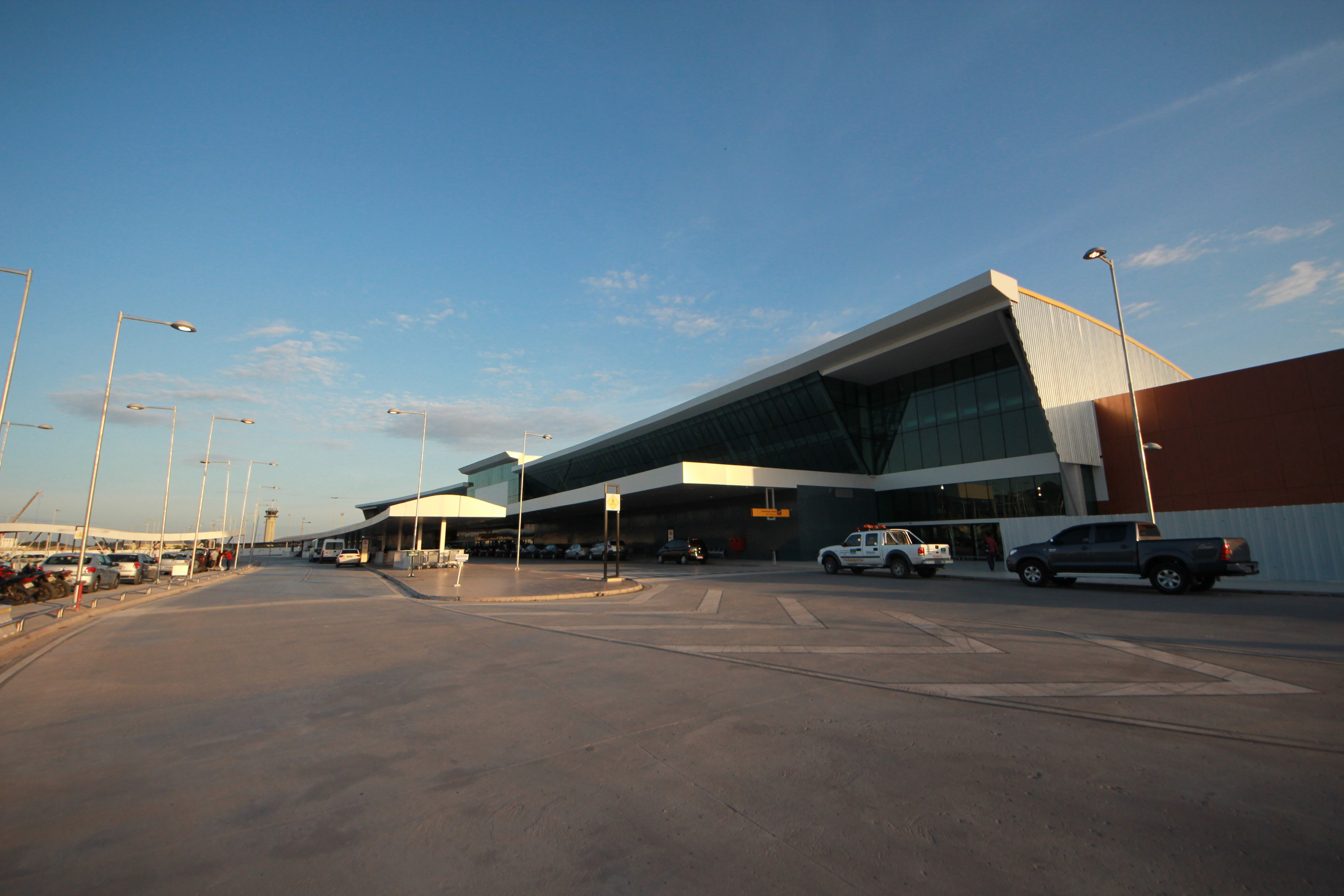
Manaus International Airport

Eduardo Gomes International Airport is the airport serving Manaus. The airport has two passenger terminals, one for scheduled flights and the other for regional aviation. It also has three cargo terminals.

Eduardo Gomes International Airport is Brazil's third largest in freight movement, handling the import and export demand from the Manaus Industrial Complex. For this reason, Infraero invested in the construction of the third cargo terminal, opened on December 14, 2004. TAM Airlines also inaugurated its own cargo terminal near the airport in 2008, which claims to be the largest cargo terminal in Brazil. The country's major dedicated freight route is between Manaus and Viracopos International Airport, which is operated by wide-body jets. Other freight routes include North America and Europe.

The passenger terminal had been fully refurbished and expanded in time for the 2014 FIFA Football World Cup, which held 4 games in Manaus. The airport currently operates daily international flights to Miami and Orlando, United States, by American Airlines and LATAM Airlines Brasil; to the city of Panama, by Copa Airlines; and to Barcelona, Venezuela, by Avior Airlines. The airport has direct flights to all major airports in Brazil, operated by the three major carriers: Gol Transportes Aéreos, TAM Airlines, and Azul Brazilian Airlines. The airport's IATA code is MAO.

Manaus Air Force Base - ALA8, one of the most important bases of the Brazilian Air Force, is located in Manaus at the former Ponta Pelada Airport.

Apart from the Eduardo Gomes International Airport and Ponta Pelada Airport, Manaus is also served by Flores Airport, used by small propeller aircraft and helicopters about 6 kilometres (4 miles) north of the city centre, simply known as the "Aeroclube" (Portuguese: Flying club). On Sundays, it is used for parachuting and where flying classes can be hired. Due to the fact that it is surrounded by residential areas, and has a recent history of crashes, it is under constant pressure to be moved.

=== Highways ===
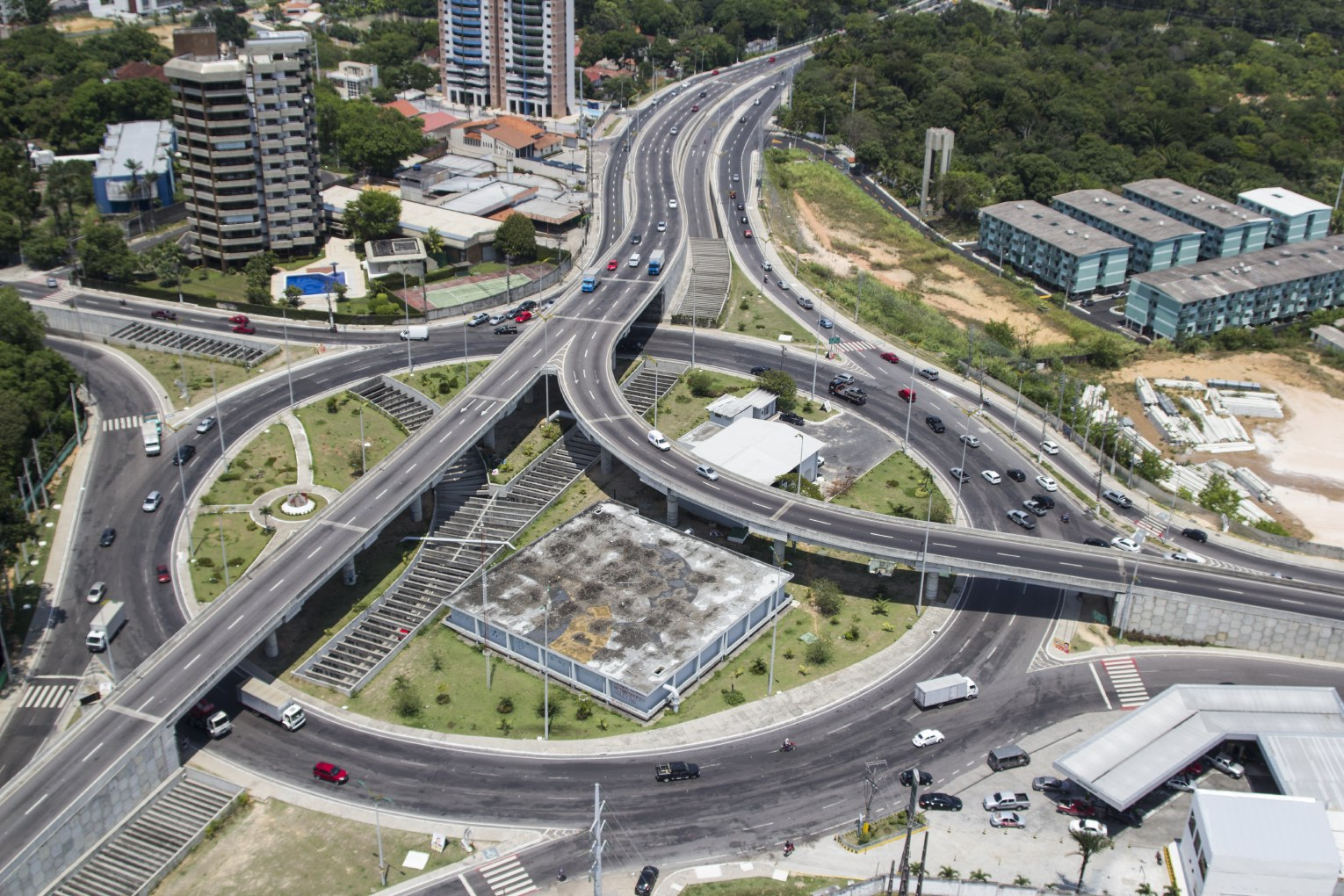
Gilberto Mestrinho road complex

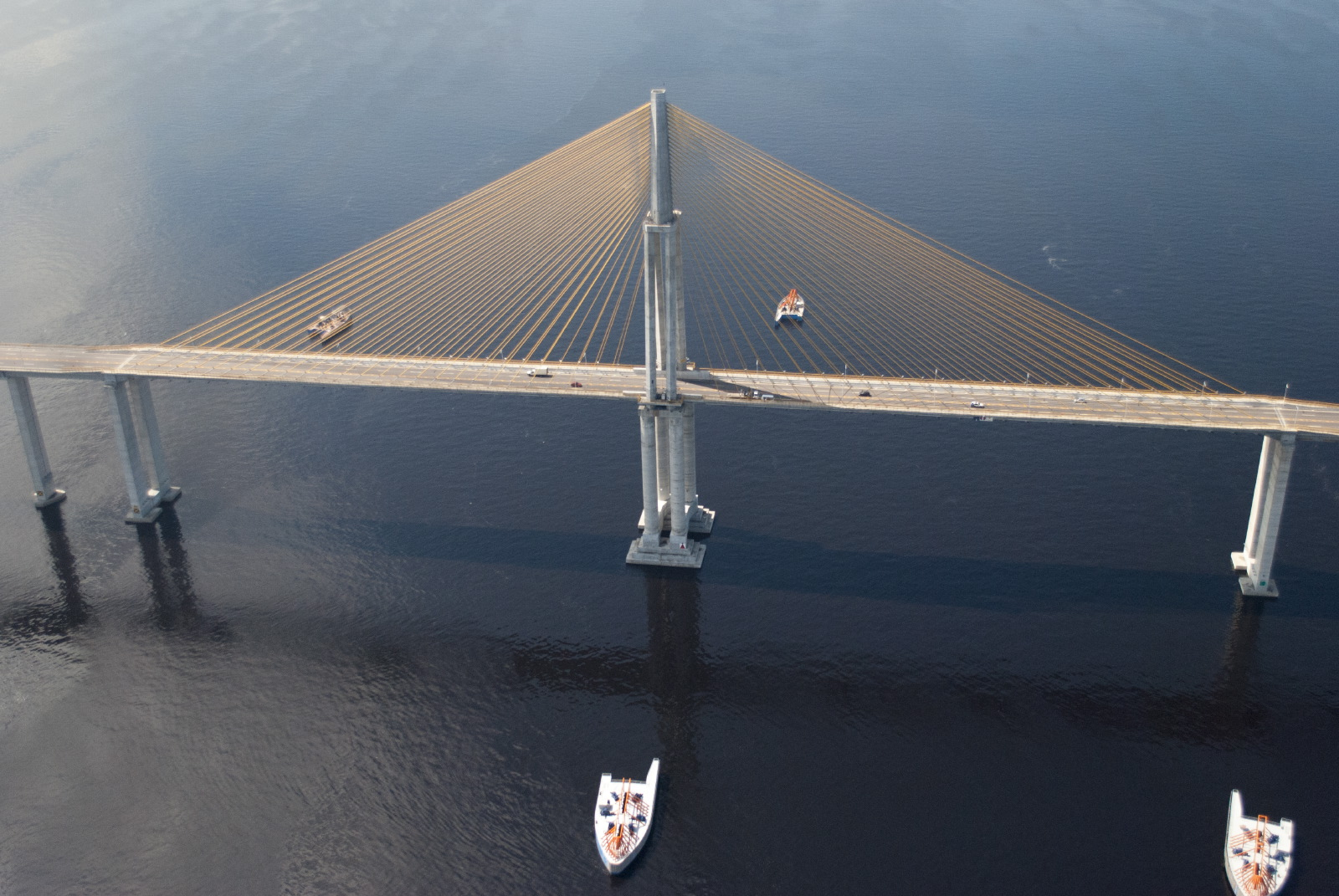
Rio Negro Bridge

There are two federal highways that intersect Manaus. There is a paved road heading North (BR-174) connecting Manaus to Boa Vista, the capital of the State of Roraima and to Venezuela. Strictly speaking, Manaus is connected by road to the rest of Brazil, as it is possible to drive continuously from Manaus into Venezuela, and then reenter Brazil through the BR-364 in Acre and its capital, Rio Branco, therefore passing through the countries of Colombia, Ecuador, Peru and Bolivia. As such a route is impractical for most motorists, the vast majority of transportation to and from Manaus is by boat or plane, except for journeys to Roraima. The Independent noted that "there are still no roads to Manaus" from the rest of the country.

The BR-319 heads South connecting Manaus to Porto Velho, the state capital of Rondônia. However, access to this highway requires a ferry crossing to Careiro, across the Rio Negro and Amazon River, which takes about 40 minutes, and then is only paved for about another 100 kilometers (60 mi) to Castanho. After that, the highway is not paved, and cannot be used. Various governments have promised to recover this land-link with the rest of the country, but environmental issues, high costs and complicated logistics have impeded any progress so far.

The two major state highways are the AM-010 and the AM-070. The AM-010 heads east, to Itacoatiara, Amazonas at the banks of the Amazon River, which is the third largest city of the state. The AM-070 heads south, starting on the other side of the new Rio Negro Bridge at Manaus, and reaching Manacapuru, which lies at the banks of the Solimoes River, also known as the upper River Amazon, and which is the fourth largest city of the state. Both roads are paved and operate all year round.

=== Port ===
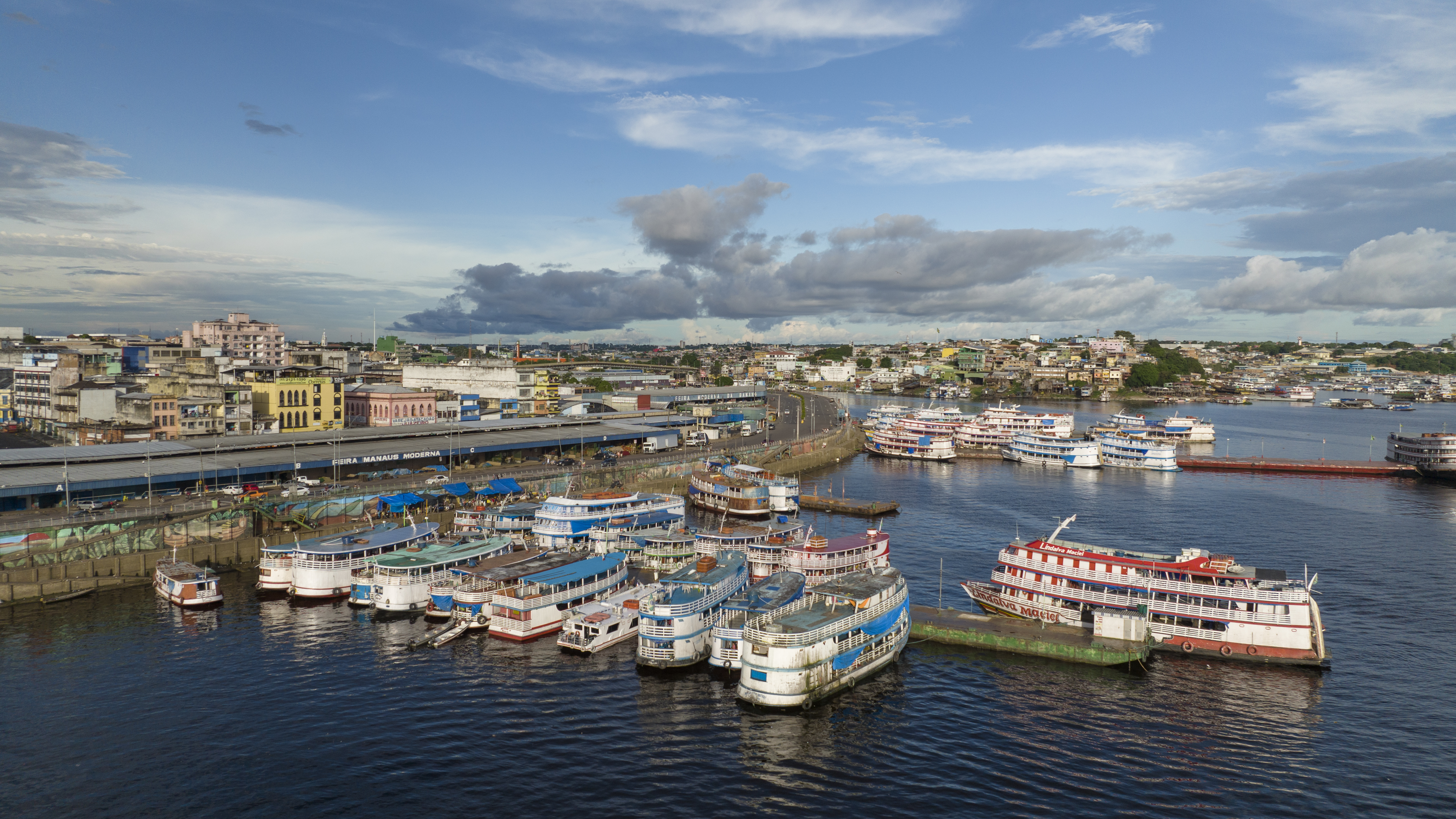
Port of Manaus

Ships dock at the main port in Manaus directly downtown on the banks of the Negro River. The terraced city is home to a network of bridged channels that divide it into several compartments. Several mobile phone companies have manufacturing plants in the port area, and other major electronics manufacturers also have plants there. Major exports going through the port include Brazil nuts, chemicals, petroleum, electrical equipment, and forest products.

=== Taxis ===
Regular Manaus taxis are white and can be stopped anywhere. They are organized into separate cooperatives, each with their own contact phone numbers. All taxis are metered, which does not necessarily mean the meter will be used.

What is known as 'special taxis' are typically black vehicles and are considered a higher quality than the white taxis. They will charge a fixed rate for all journeys or daily hire. Most can only be booked locally; however, the reputable Brazil Airport Transfers has recently started providing airport transfer and general transportation services in Manaus.

=== Bus ===
The bus system in Manaus includes buses and vans that travel to most locations, including tourist destinations. A bus website allows users to plan routes.

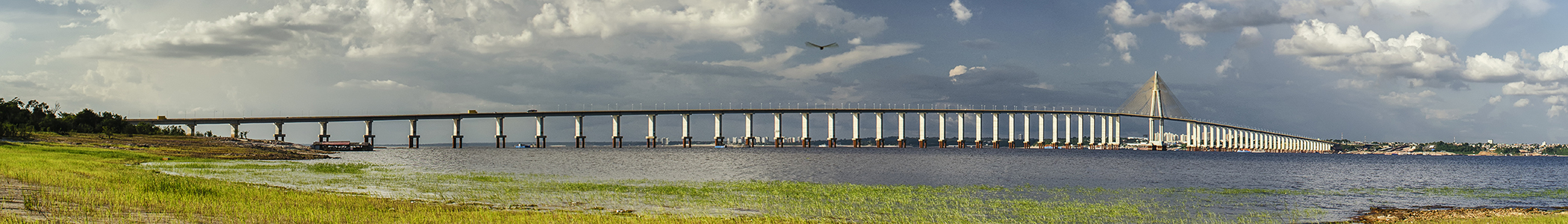
Panorama of the Rio Negro Bridge, which connects the cities of Manaus and Iranduba. It is the longest cable-stayed bridge in Brazil, being 3,595 meters (11,794 ft) in length.

== Events and holidays ==
The annual calendar of festivals in Manaus starts in late February / early March. The Manaus carnival (carnaval) celebrations are a good start to upcoming events and include traditional processions and samba dancing at the Sambódromo in the Centro de Convenções (Convention Centre). May is a popular time to pay a visit to Manaus, since the city hosts both the Ponta Negra Music and the Amazonas de Opera festivals during this month. Staged at the Teatro Amazonas, the Opera Festival lasts around three weeks and usually runs into early June. The Floclorico do Amazonas (Amazonas Folklore Festival) is in June, and this has grown to become a major event, involving a huge array of folk dancing and music, culminating in the Procissao Fluvial de São Pedro (St. Peter River Procession), when hundreds of riverboats sail along the Rio Negro, honouring the patron saint of fishermen.

October 24 was the day in 1848 that Manaus legally became a city. This anniversary is always cause for a party, culminating in fireworks at the end of the day. In November is the week-long Amazonas Film Festival, with films and documentaries often emphasising ecology, ethnology and human relationships.

- February—Amazonas Carnival—samba schools parade at the "sambódromo" in the Convention Center
- May—Ponta Negra's Music Festival
- May—Amazonas Opera Festival
- June—Amazonas Folklore Festival
- June 29—São Pedro Fluvial Procession
- July—Amazonas Jazz Festival
- September 5—Elevation of Amazonas to the category of Brazilian Province
- October 24—Anniversary of Manaus
- December 31—Ponta Negra's New Year's Eve Party

== Sights and attractions ==
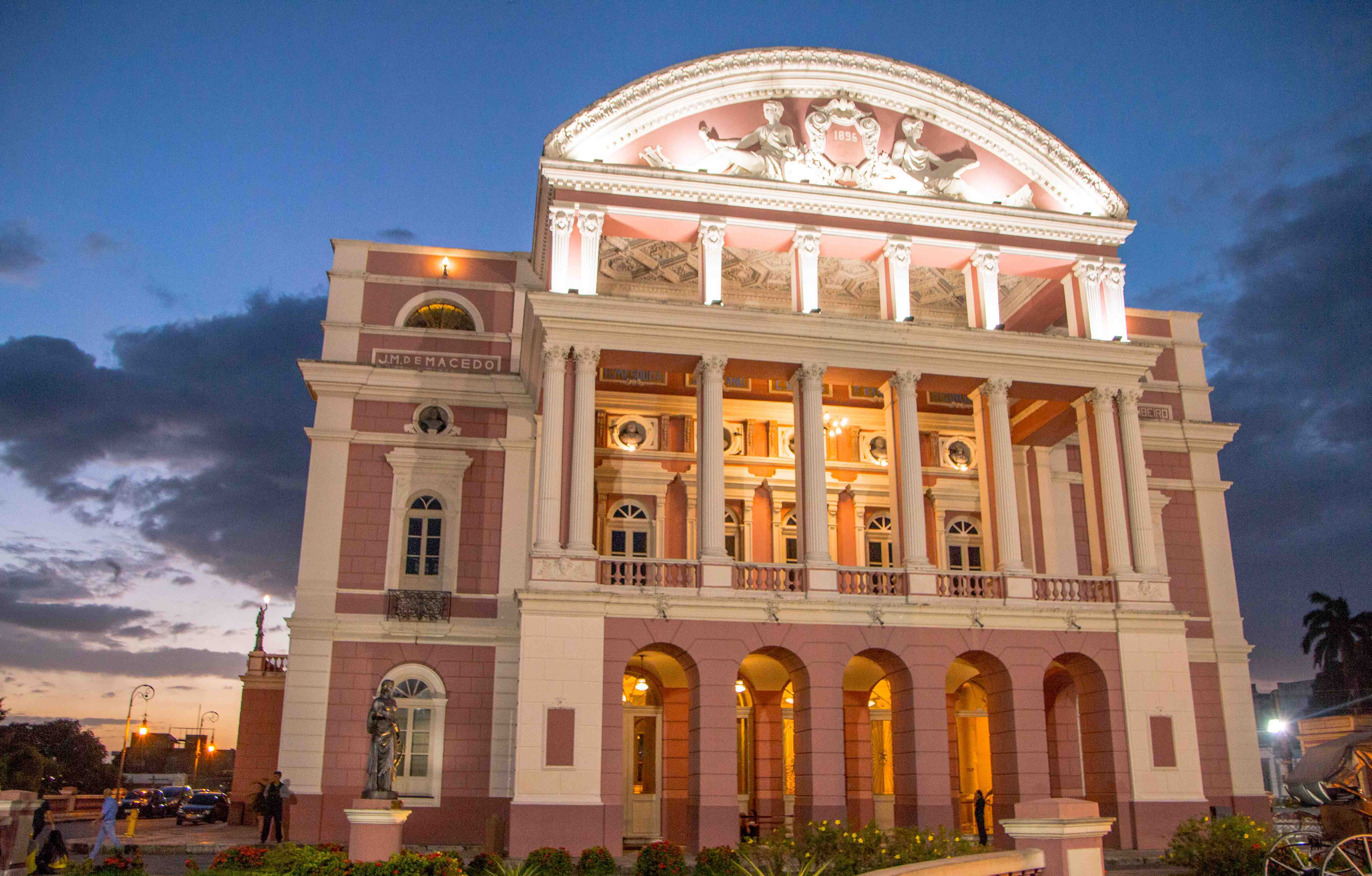
Amazon Theatre, in Manaus. More than 120 years old, it represents the city's heyday during the rubber boom.

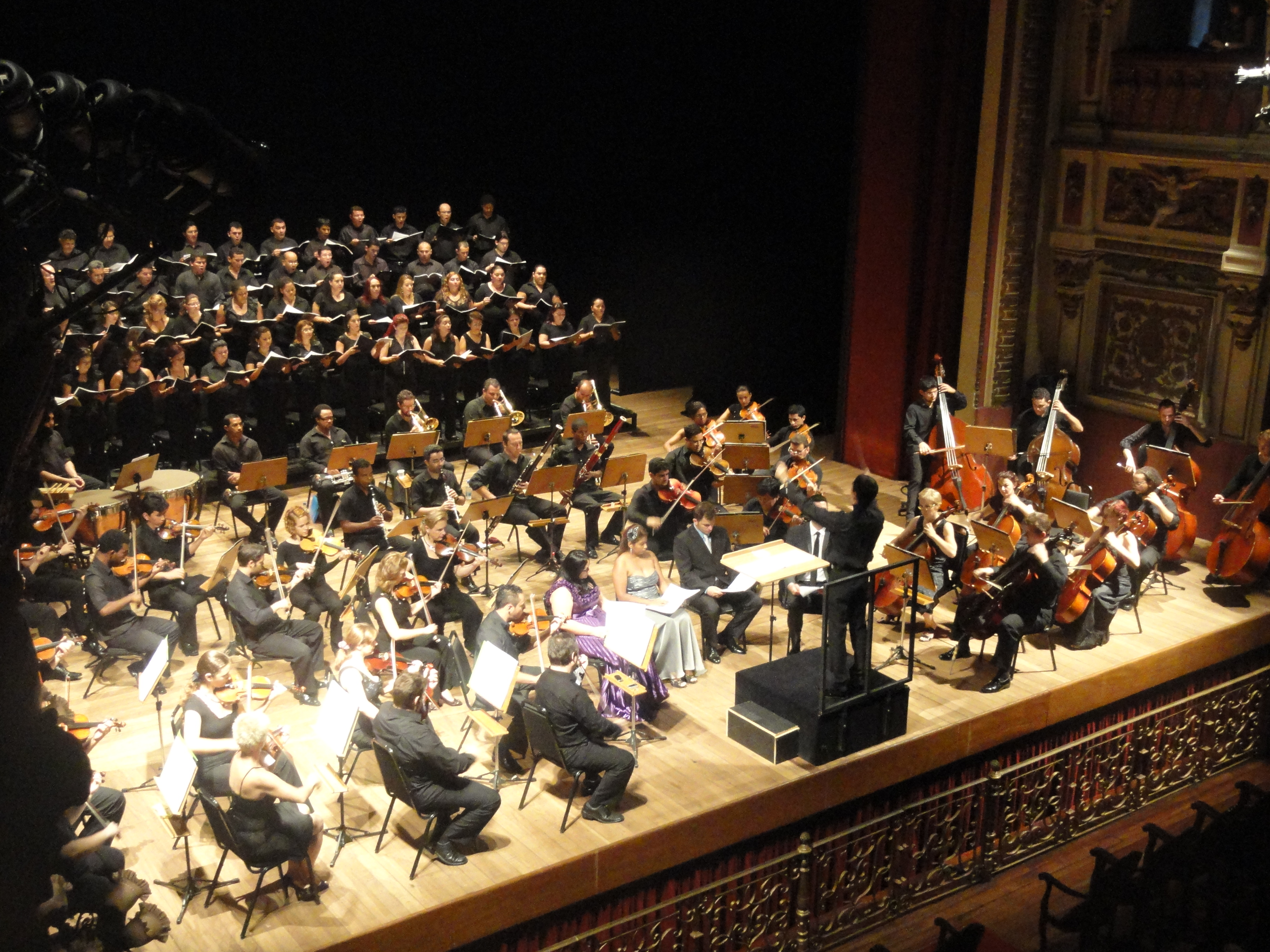
Amazonas Philharmonic

Because of Manaus' location within the Amazon rainforest, it attracts a substantial number of Brazilian and foreign tourists, who come to see wildlife on land and in the rivers. It is also home to one of the most endangered primates in Brazil, the pied tamarin.

Tour boats leave Manaus to see the Meeting of the Waters, where the black waters of the Negro River meet the brown waters of the Solimoes River, flowing side by side without mixing for about 9 km (6 mi). Visitors can also explore riverbanks and "igarapes", swim and canoe in placid lakes, simply walk in the lush forest or stay at hotels in the jungle.

About 18 km (11 mi) from downtown is Ponta Negra beach, a neighbourhood that has a beachfront and popular nightlife area. A luxurious hotel is located at the west end of Ponta Negra; its zoo and orchid greenhouse as well as preserved woods and beach are open for public visits.

The Mercado Adolpho Lisboa, founded in 1882, is the city's oldest marketplace, trading in fruit, vegetables, and especially fish. It is a copy of the Les Halles market of Paris. Other interesting historical sites include the customs building, of mixed styles and medieval inspiration; the Rio Negro Palace cultural center; and the Justice Palace, right next to the Amazonas Opera House.

Manaus has also many large parks with native forest preservation areas, such as the Bosque da Ciência and Parque do Mindú. The largest urban forest in the world is located within the Federal University of Amazonas, which was founded on January 17, 1909, and is the oldest federal university in Brazil.

Manaus also has several malls such as Manauara Shopping, Amazonas Shopping Center, Millennium Shopping, Shopping Ponta Negra, Studio 5 Festival Mall, Shopping Cidade Nova, Manaus Plaza Shopping, Shopping Sao José, and other small Shopping Areas. Most of these malls include large food courts and movie theaters.

=== Culture ===
The city's cultural calendar throughout the year includes the Opera, Theater, Jazz, and Cinema festivals, as well as Boi Manaus (usually held around Manaus' anniversary on the 24th of October), which is a great celebration of Northern Brazilian culture through Boi-Bumbá music.

=== Amazonas Opera House ===
The Amazonas Opera House, inaugurated in 1896, has 700 seats and was constructed with bricks brought from Europe, French glass, and Italian marble. Several important opera and theater companies, as well as international orchestras, have already performed there. The theater is home to the Amazonas Philharmonic orchestra which regularly rehearses and performs there along with choirs, jazz bands, dance performances, and more.

=== Parks ===
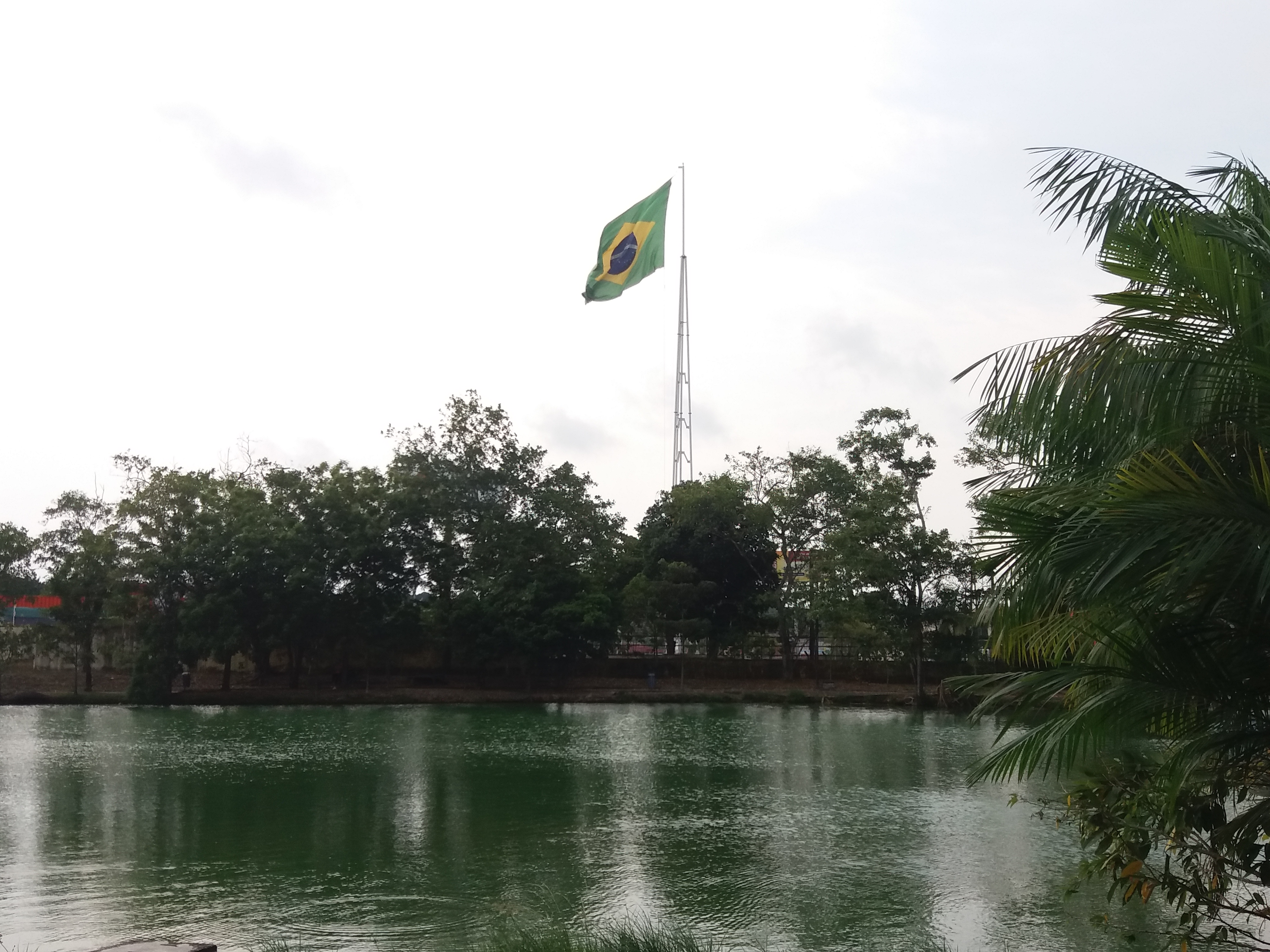
Lagoa do Japiim Park

Ponta Negra Cultural, Sport, and Leisure Park

Ponta Negra beach, located 13 km (8.1 mi) from downtown Manaus, is one of the city's most important tourist attractions. It also has an amphitheater with a capacity of 15.000 people.

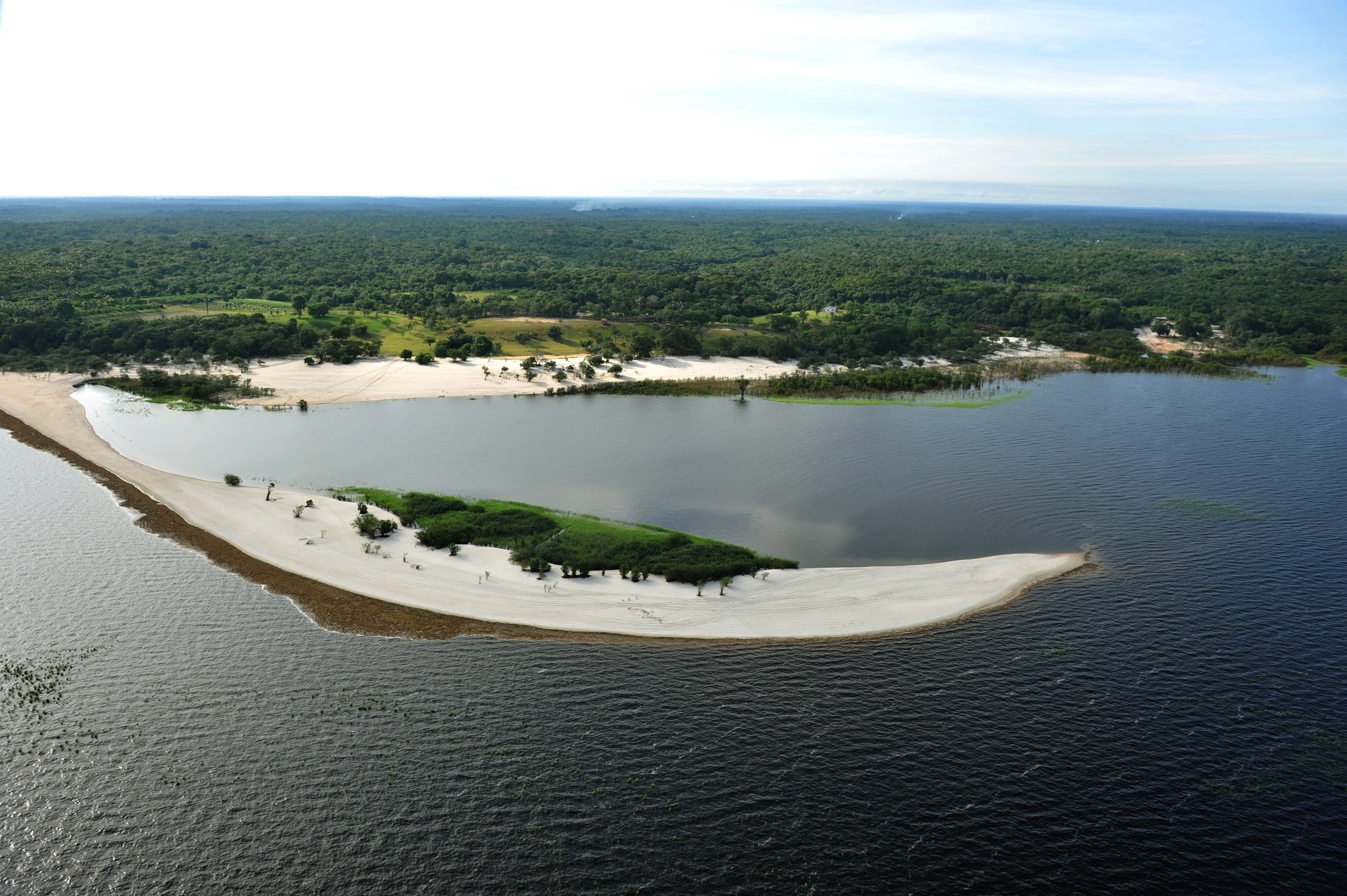
Lua Beach.

Adolpho Ducke Botanical Garden

The Adolpho Ducke Botanical Garden, inside a 100 square kilometres (39 sq mi) ecological reserve, holds a huge number of plant and animal species.

Mindu Municipal Park

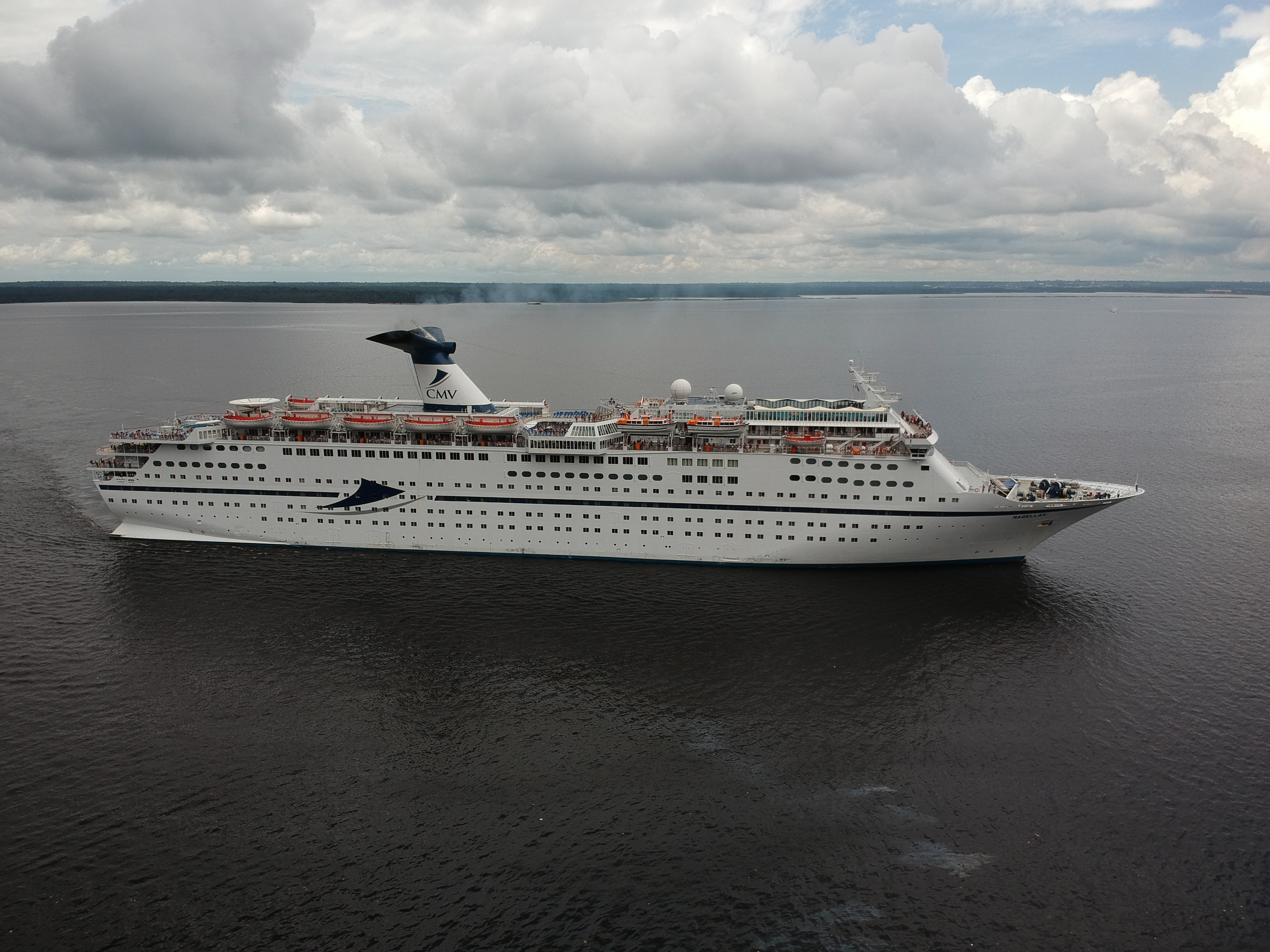
Cruise ship on the Negro River on the way to the city of Manaus.

It is located in an urban area, in the November 10 Park district. It was created in 1992 to be an area of ecological interest. It covers an area of 330,000 m^{2} (3,552,090 sq ft) of forest remaining from the Township, and is used for scientific, educational, cultural and tourist activities. It is one of the last habitats for the pied tamarin, a species of monkey that only inhabits the Manaus region and is considered to be at high risk of extinction. It is possible to walk through four distinct ecosystems in the park: land covered by secondary growth, firm ground brush, sandbanks and degraded areas that were illegally cleared in 1989. It also has an amphitheater for 600 people, gardens planted with medicinal and aromatic herbs, an orchid nursery, aerial trails, and signs aiming to develop environmental education programs.

=== Public swimming areas ===
The Tarumã, Tarumãzinho, and Cachoeira das Almas bayous (branches of rivers), located near the city, are leisure spots for the population on weekends. Manaus has several public swimming areas that are being remodeled and urbanized lately. There are also many private clubs that can be visited.

=== Meeting of Waters ===
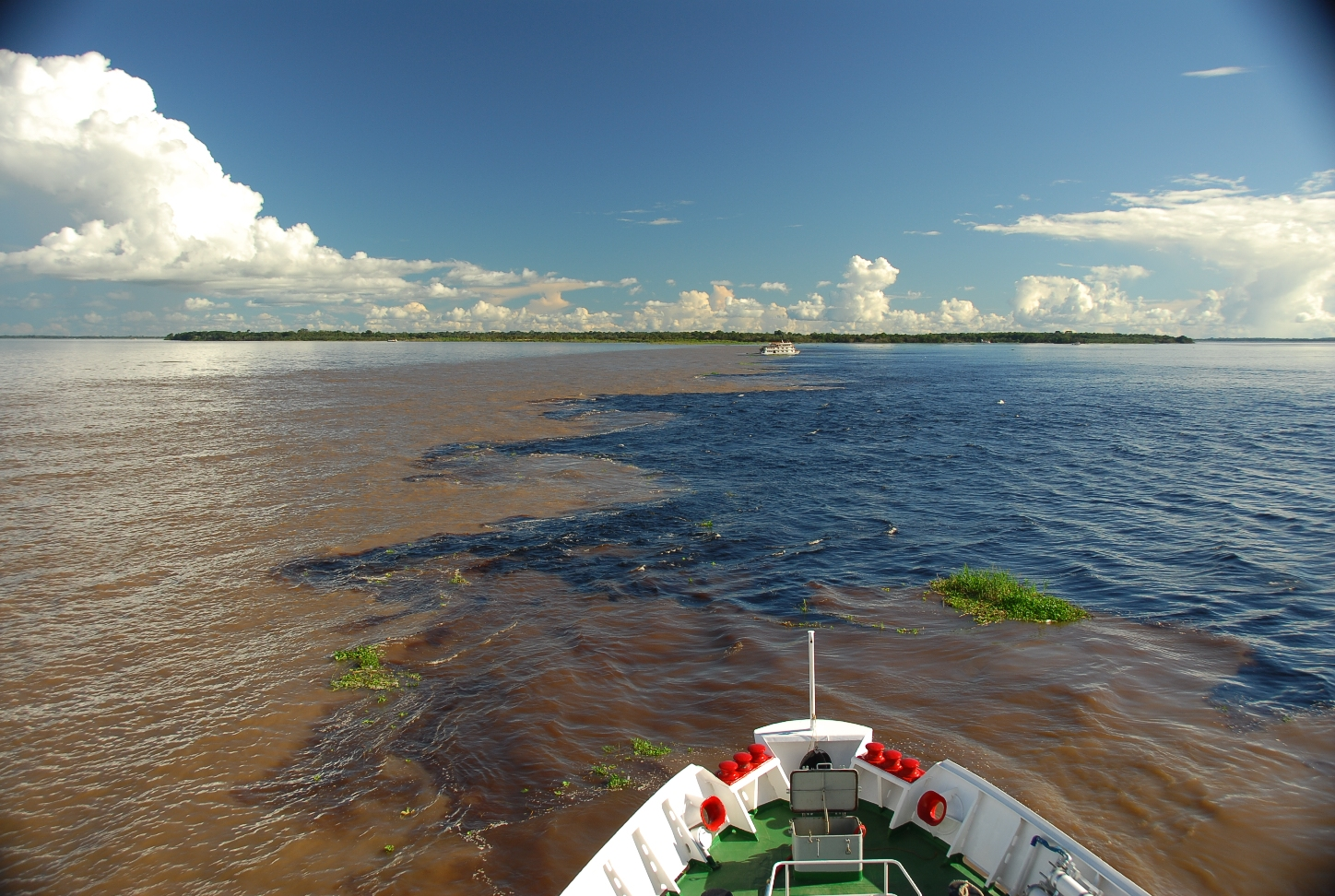
The natural phenomenon of the confluence of the Rio Negro's water and the Solimões River's water

The Meeting of Waters (Portuguese: Encontro das Àguas) is a natural phenomenon caused by the confluence of the Rio Negro's dark water and the Solimões River's muddy brown water that come together to form the Amazonas River. For 6 km (3.7 mi) or more, both rivers' waters run side by side without mixing.

The reason for this is not clear, although it is likely that the main factors are differences in the speed of the current, the volumes of water and the different densities of the two rivers. It is not thought that other differences between the two rivers (temperature and acidity) affect the mixing process significantly. The Negro River flows approximately 2 km/h (1.2 mph) at 28 °C (82 °F), while the Solimões River flows 4 to 6 km/h (2.5 to 3.7 mph) at 22 °C (72 °F).

=== CIGS Zoo ===
The zoo is open to the public. It is managed by the Brazilian Army and has approximately 300 species of animals from the Amazon fauna.

=== Beaches and waterfalls ===
For outings to beaches and parks situated near the city, it is often necessary to use boats. The beaches are formed right after the river water level starts dropping, which lasts from August to November. Starting in December, as the river rises, the waters invade the sand and the woods on the banks. The Paricatuba Waterfall, located on the right bank of the Negro River, along a small tributary, is formed by sedimentary rocks, surrounded by abundant vegetation. Access is by boat. The best time to visit is from August to February. Love Cascade located in the Guedes bayou, with cold and crystal-clear water, is accessible only by boat and, then, hiking through the forest.

Tupé Beach is approximately 34 km (21 mi) from Manaus. This beach is well frequented by bathers on holidays and weekends. It is accessible only by boat. Moon Beach is located on the left bank of the Negro River, 23 km (14 mi) from Manaus. It is accessed only by boat. The beach is shaped like a crescent moon and is surrounded by rare vegetation. Lion Waterfall is located on km 34 of the AM-010 highway (Manaus-Itacoatiara).

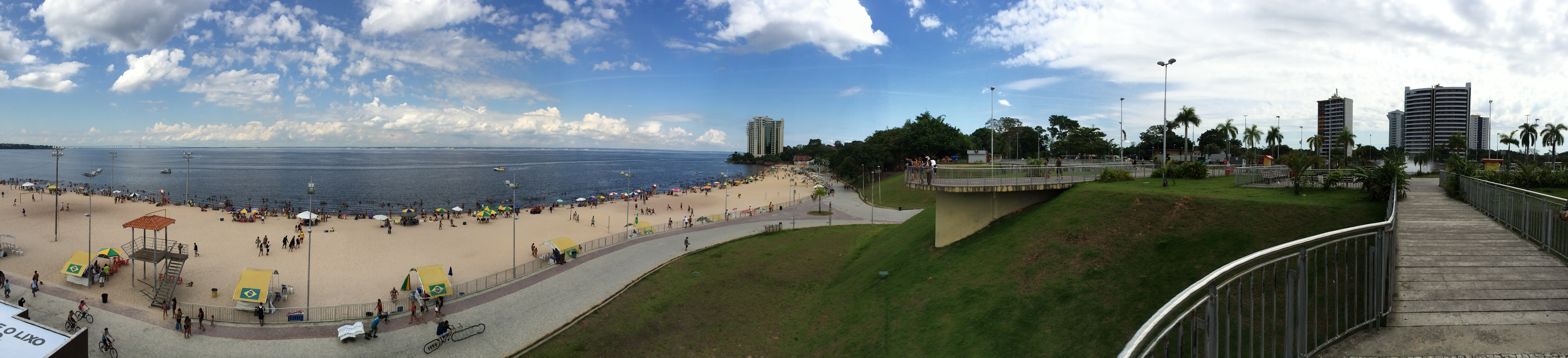
Ponta Negra Beach in 2014.

== Sports ==
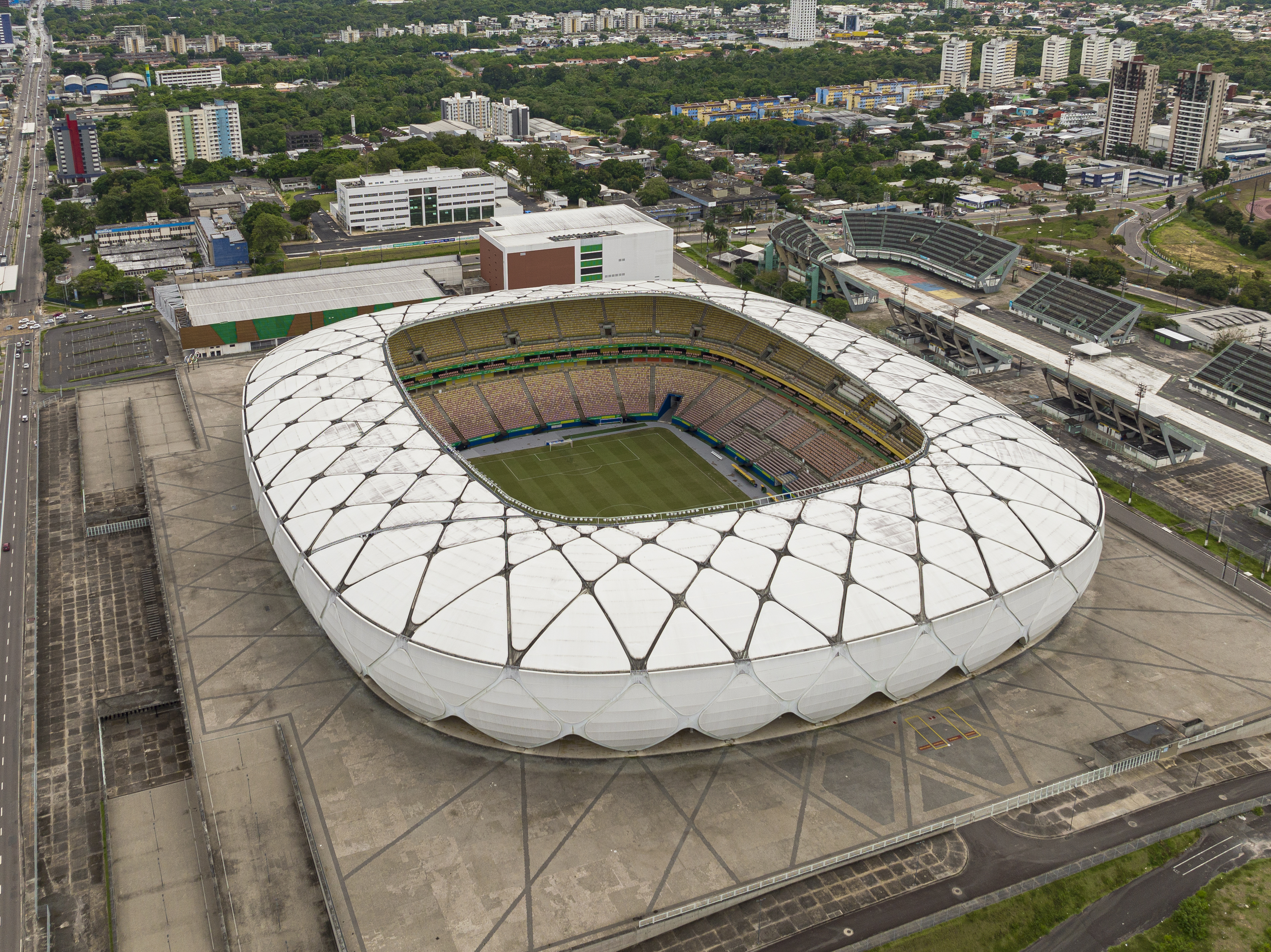
Arena Amazônia

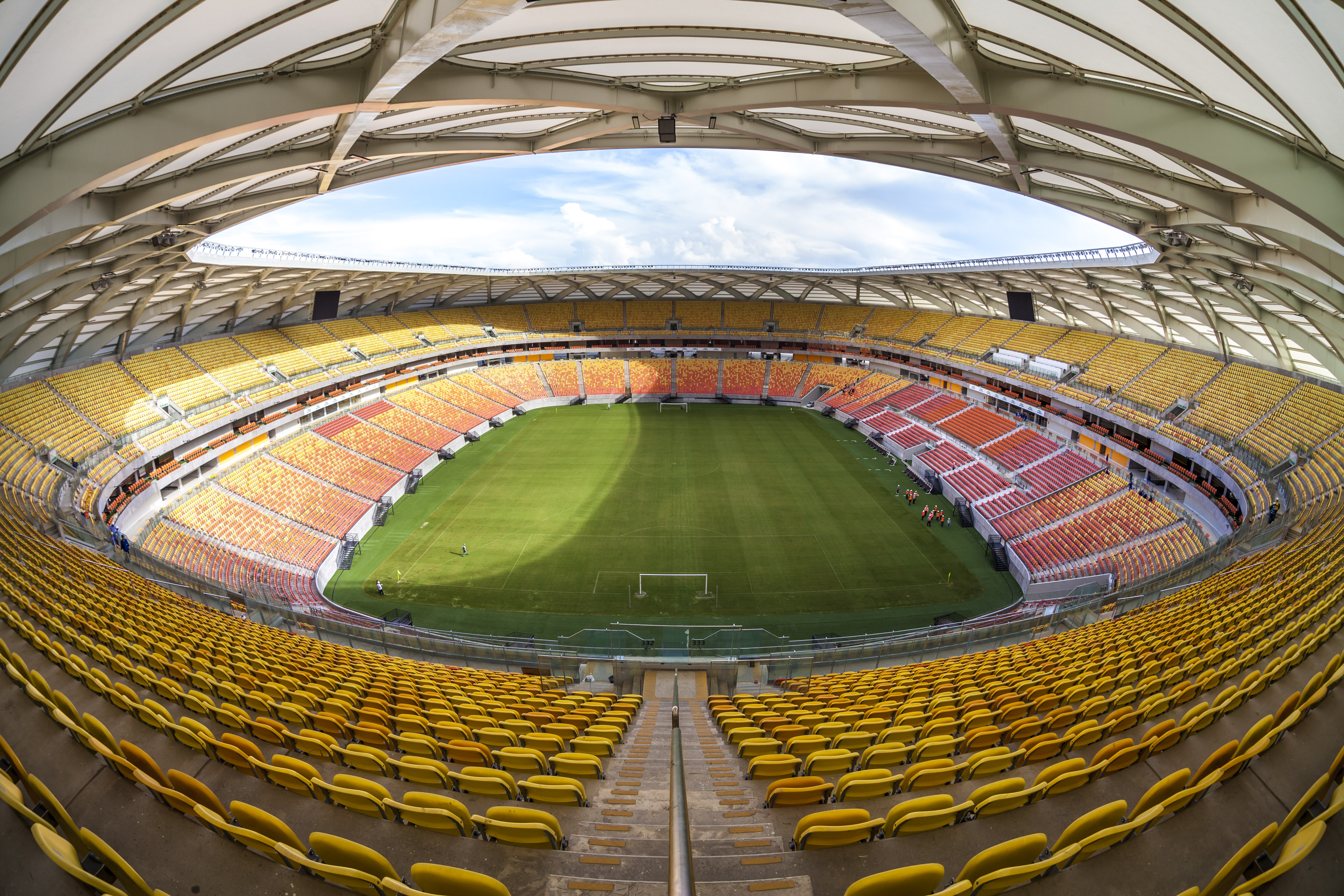
Internal view of arena

=== Football ===
The most successful club in Manaus is Nacional Futebol Clube, founded on 13 January 1913. Formerly a participant of the highest division several times between 1970 and 1990, Nacional are 40-time state champions, which makes them the highest-ranked Amazonian football club in the CBF ranking, the national state championships record holder, and the state record holder for the most championship titles.

The city has quite a few other clubs with distinguished histories such as Atlético Rio Negro Clube, also founded in 1913, but in November, who have won the state championship 17 times. National Fast Club, founded after a split from Nacional Clube, have won six state championships, in addition to being Northern Region champions and Northeastern Championship runners-up in 1970. São Raimundo EC, founded on November 18, 1918. They have won the state championship six times and the North Cup 3 times. Sul América Esporte Clube, founded on 1 of May, 1932. They have won the state championship twice in 1992 and 1993. Finally, Atlético Clipper Clube who have twice finished as runners-up in the state championship in 1996 and 2002.

Manaus Futebol Clube, founded in 2013, competes in the Campeonato Brasileiro Série C.

==== 2014 FIFA World Cup ====
Manaus was chosen in 2009 to be a host city for the 2014 FIFA World Cup, after a competition to represent the North Region of Brazil with neighboring Pará state capital, Belém.

Manaus was restructured in order to host such a big event. A new airport was built, streets throughout the city were repaved and new and improved sidewalks were built. The communications infrastructure of the city was improved with 4G networks installed by the biggest mobile phone carriers in Brazil.

The Vivaldão, previously the largest stadium in Manaus, was inaugurated in 1970 by the Brazilian national team in their last game in the country before they headed to their victorious 1970 World Cup in Mexico. It was demolished to be replaced by the 44,000-seater Arena Amazônia for the 2014 World Cup.

The first 2014 World Cup match held in Manaus was England vs Italy on June 14. The second match was Cameroon vs Croatia on June 18, to be followed by USA vs Portugal on June 22. The last was Honduras vs Switzerland on June 25. Manaus, known for its intense heat and humidity, was the site of the World Cup's first-ever official water break on June 22 in the match between Portugal and the United States.

=== Brazilian jiu-jitsu ===
Manaus is the origin of several world-champion Brazilian jiu-jitsu black belts, mixed martial artists and submission grapplers. Champions such as Fredson Paixão, Wallid Ismail, Saulo Ribeiro, Cristiane De Souza, Alexandre Ribeiro, Ronaldo Souza, Diogo Reis, Micael Galvão, Fabricio Andrey, and Diego Lopes hail from Manaus. Brazilian jiu-jitsu is a major component of MMA (mixed martial arts). José Aldo (born September 9, 1986) is a black belt in Brazilian jiu-jitsu and a notable UFC fighter. Aldo defeated Mike Brown at WEC 44 to win the title and has since successfully defended his WEC title against Urijah Faber & Manvel Gamburyan. He later became the UFC Featherweight champion, with title defenses against such notable fighters as Mark Hominick and Kenny Florian.

== Consular representations ==
The following countries have consular representations in Manaus:

- Colombia (Consulate-General)
- Japan (Consulate-General)
- Peru (Consulate-General)
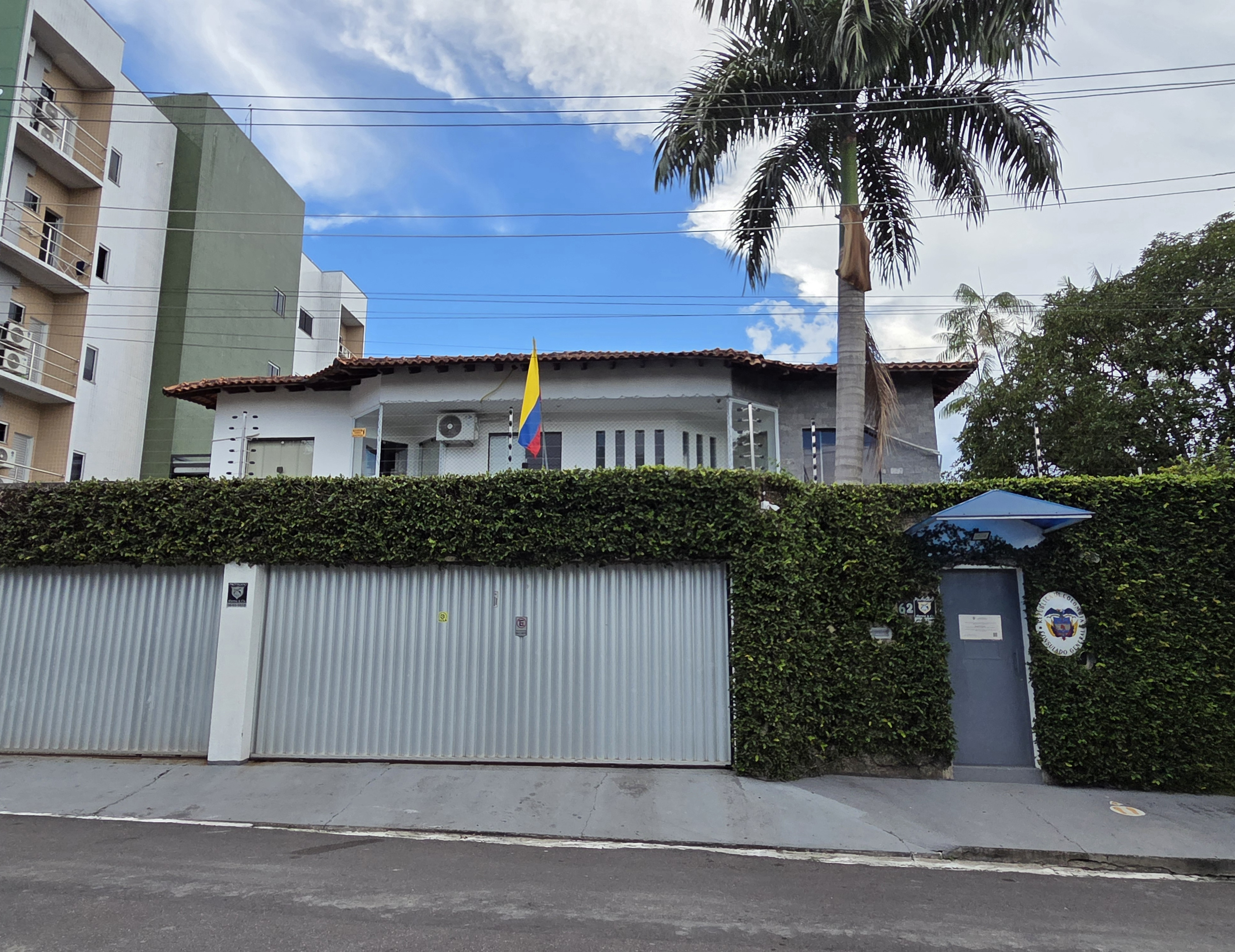
Consulate-General of Colombia

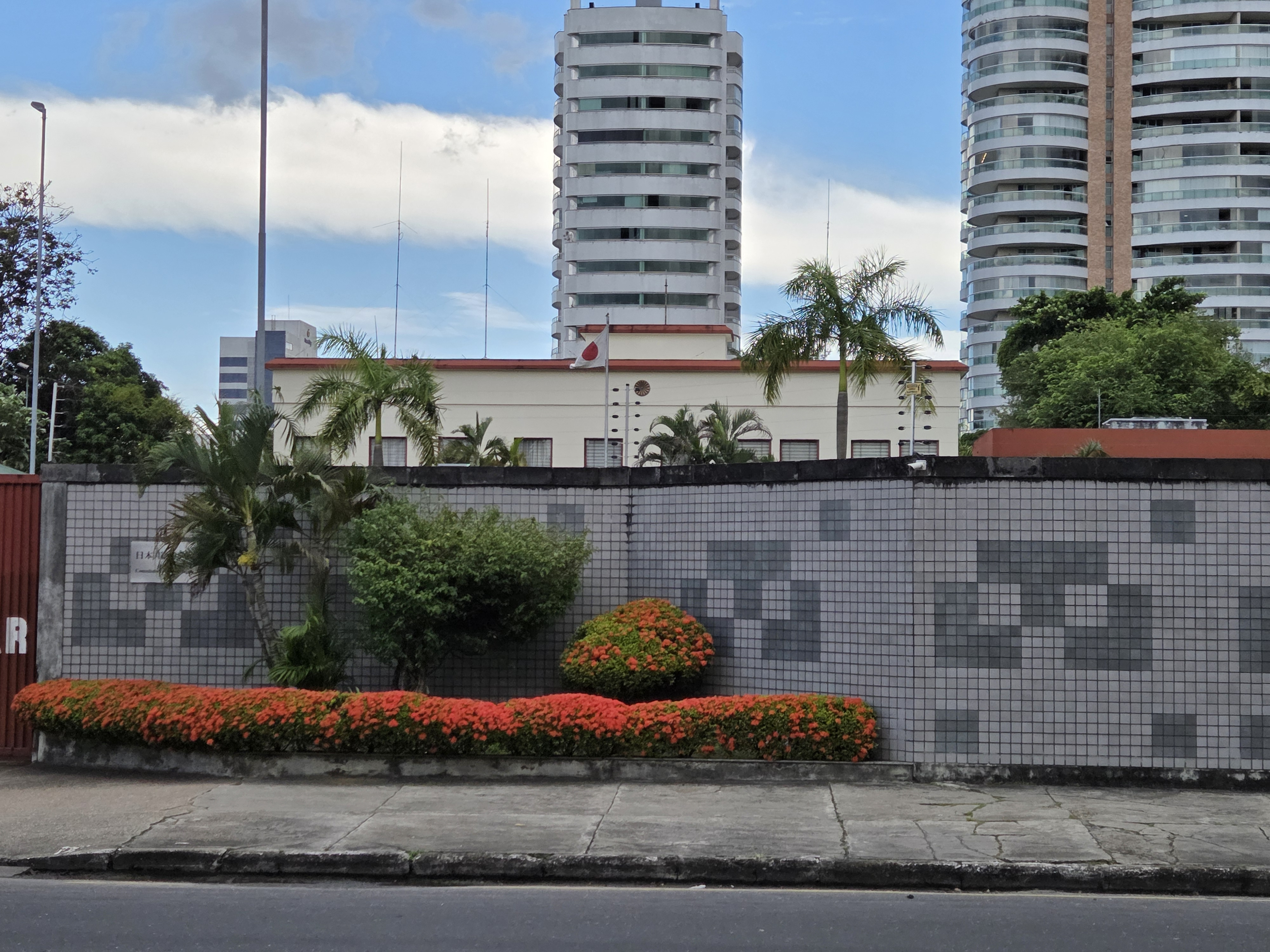
Consulate-General of Japan

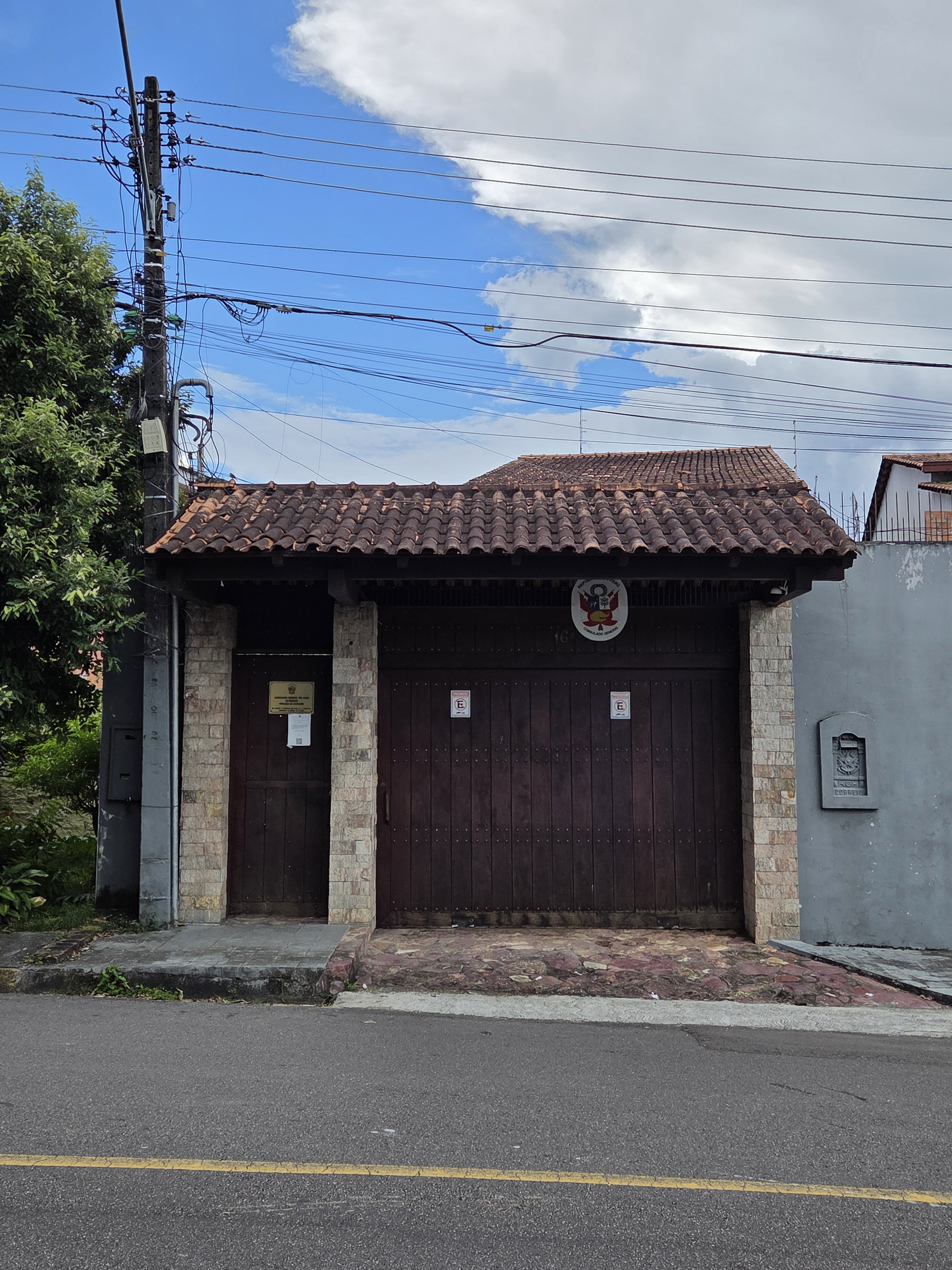
Consulate-General of Peru

== International relations ==
=== Twin towns – sister cities ===
Manaus is twinned with:

Belém, Brazil; Goiânia, Brazil; Rio de Janeiro, Brazil; Austin, Texas, United States; Charlotte, North Carolina, United States; Mesa, Arizona, United States; Sarnia, Canada; Iquitos, Peru	Braga, Portugal; Perugia, Italy; Jerusalem, Israel; Seoul, South Korea; Hamamatsu, Japan; Shanghai, China; Banjarmasin, Indonesia; Santo Domingo, Dominican Republic

== Notable people ==
- José Aldo, UFC featherweight champion
- Antônio Pizzonia, Formula 1 and Champion Car World Series driver
- Daynara de Paula, swimmer
- Fredson Paixão, 4× BJJ world champion, UFC & WEC Featherweight (MMA)
- Diego Brandão, Ultimate Fighter Season 14 featherweight winner
- Vinicius Cantuária, bossa nova musician
- Bibiano Fernandes, jiu-jitsu competitor
- Marcelo Gomes, principal dancer with American Ballet Theatre
- Sandro Viana, sprinter, Olympic medallist
- Wallid Ismail, jiu-jitsu black belt, UFC competitor
- Francisco Lima Govinho, football player
- Larissa Ramos, Miss Earth 2009
- Mister No, comic book character
- Cristiano Moraes Oliveira, football player
- Fábio Pereira de Oliveira, known as Fábio Bala, Brazilian football player
- Jefferson Peres, politician
- Adana Omágua Kambeba, doctor and shaman
- Eliana Printes, MPB singer and composer
- Raimar, footballer
- Eduardo Piccinini, swimmer
- Saulo Ribeiro, jiu-jitsu world champion
- Xande Ribeiro, jiu-jitsu world champion
- Malvino Salvador, actor
- Cláudio Santoro, conductor and composer of classical music
- Ronaldo Souza, jiu-jitsu world champion, ADCC Submission Wrestling World Championship and UFC competitor
- Wallace Souza, Television presenter and politician
- Diego Lopes, UFC featherweight fighter and jiu-jitsu competitor

== In popular culture ==
In the anime and manga Dr. Stone, an explosion located in the coordinates 3° 7' S, 60° 1' W, roughly in the municipal cemetery of Manaus, caused the petrification of all humans on earth in the year 2019.

The city of Manaus and its surrounding Amazon region are also depicted in Ann Patchett's novel State of Wonder, which explores scientific expeditions and the mysteries of the rainforest.

== See also ==
- Benjamin Constant Bridge
- Provincial Palace
