= List of municipalities in Amazonas by HDI =

This is a list of municipalities in Amazonas ordered by Human Development Index (HDI) according to data released by the United Nations Development Program (UNDP) of the United Nations for the 2010. The Human Development Index was developed in 1990 by the Pakistani economist Mahbub ul Haq and the Indian economist Amartya Sen.

According to the list. of the 62 municipalities in the state of Amazonas, none of them have very high HDI (equal to or greater than 0.800), 1 has high HDI (between 0.700 and 0.799), 14 have medium (between 0.600 and 0.699), 40 have low (between 0.500 and 0.599), and 7 have very low (less than 0.500). The HDI of Amazonas is 0.674 (considered medium).

== Criteria ==
Map of HDI of the municipalities of Amazonas. Legend: Very high (no municipality) High (1 municipality) Medium (14 municipalities) Low (40 municipalities) Very low (7 municipalities)

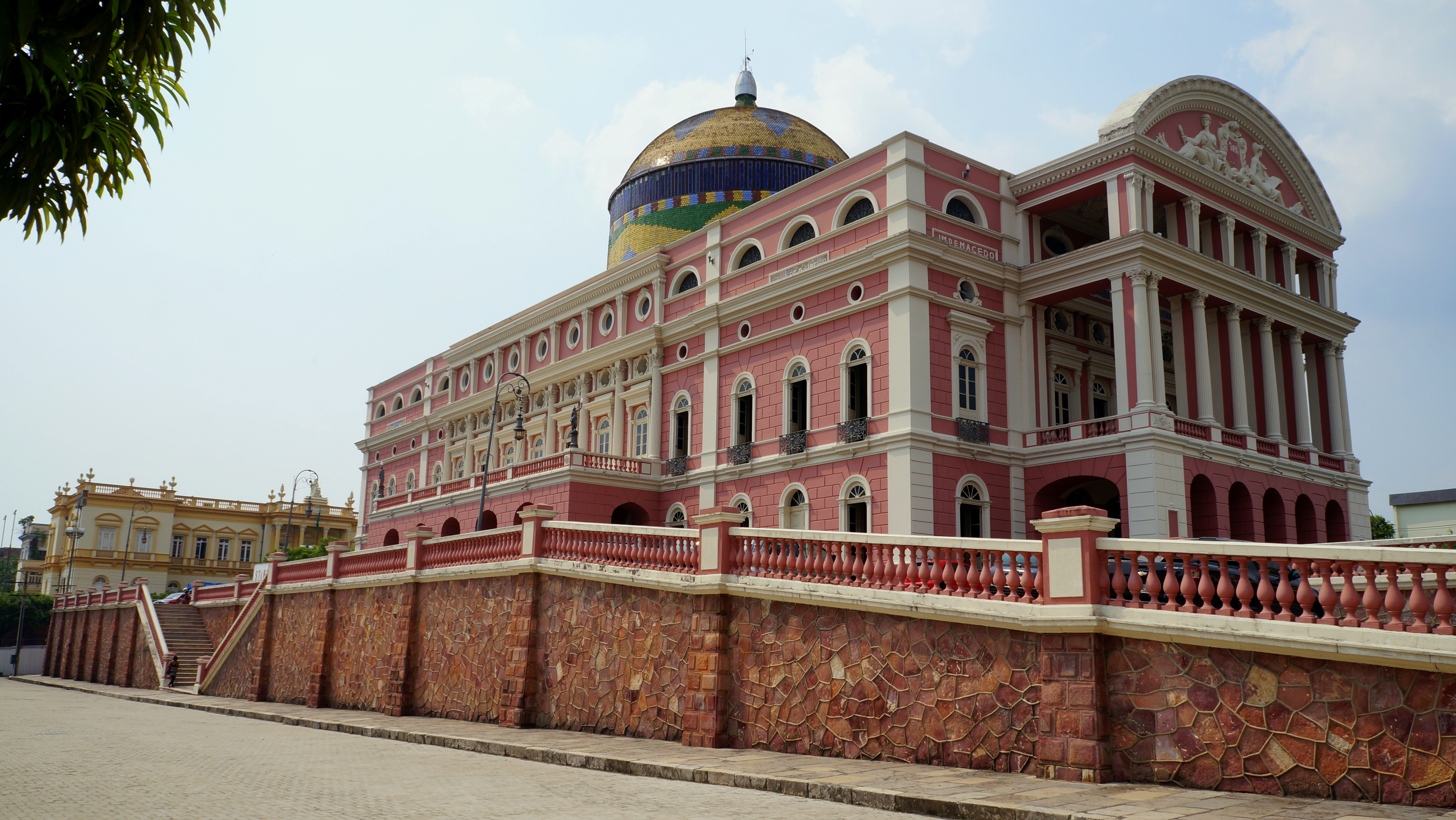
Amazon Theatre in Manaus.

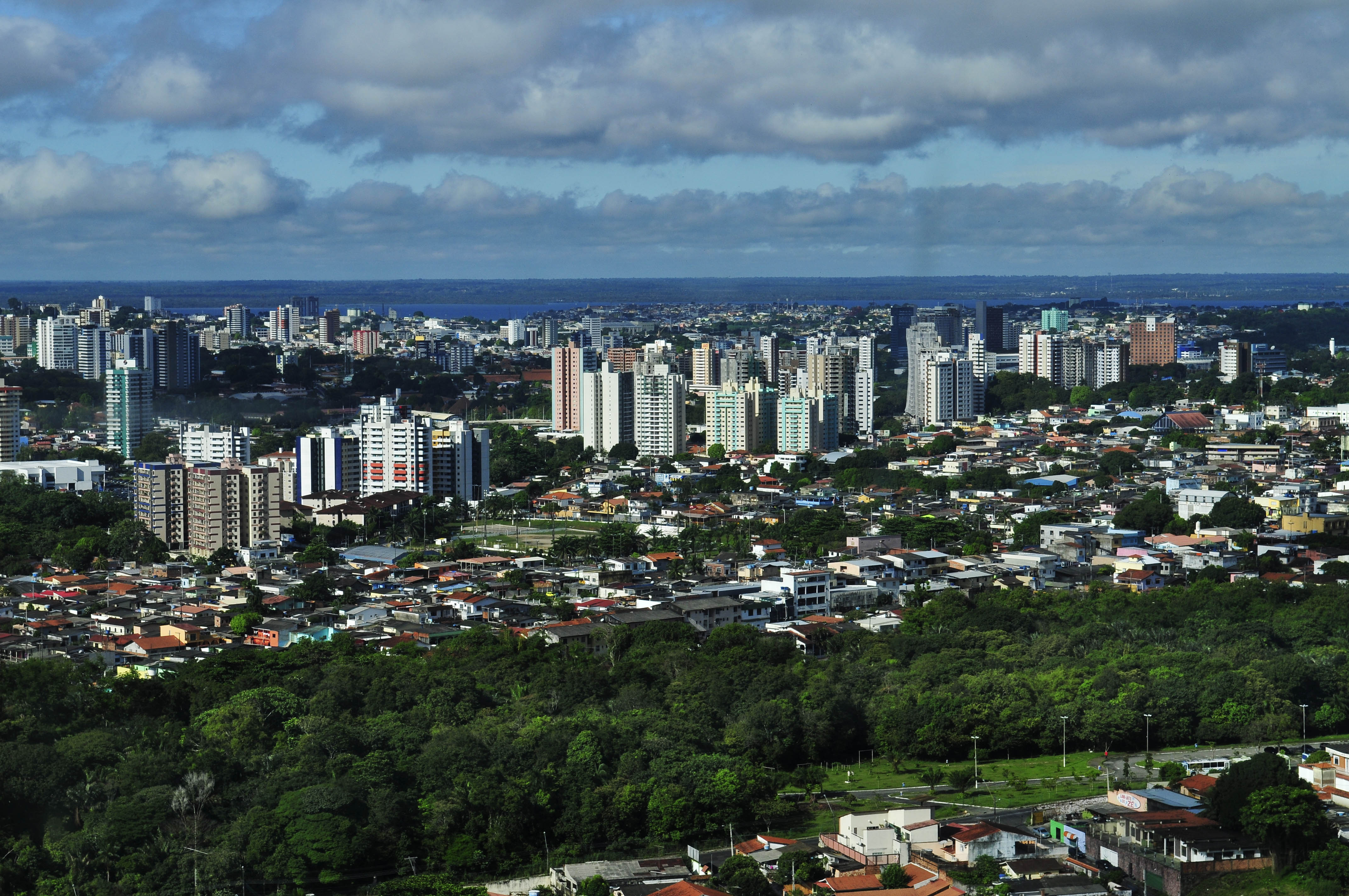
Partial aerial view of Manaus.

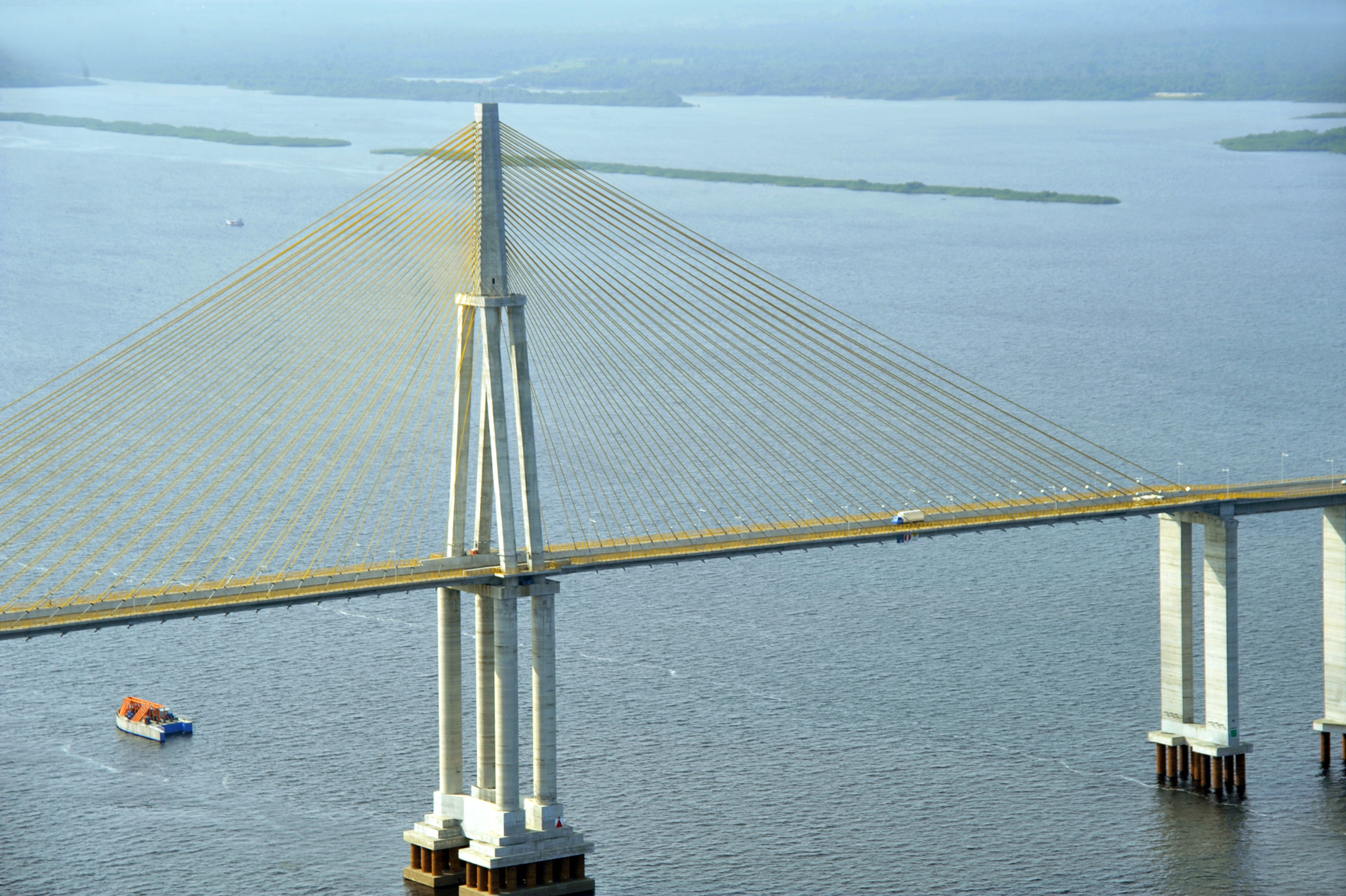
Aerial view of the bridge over the Rio Negro that links Manaus to Iranduba.

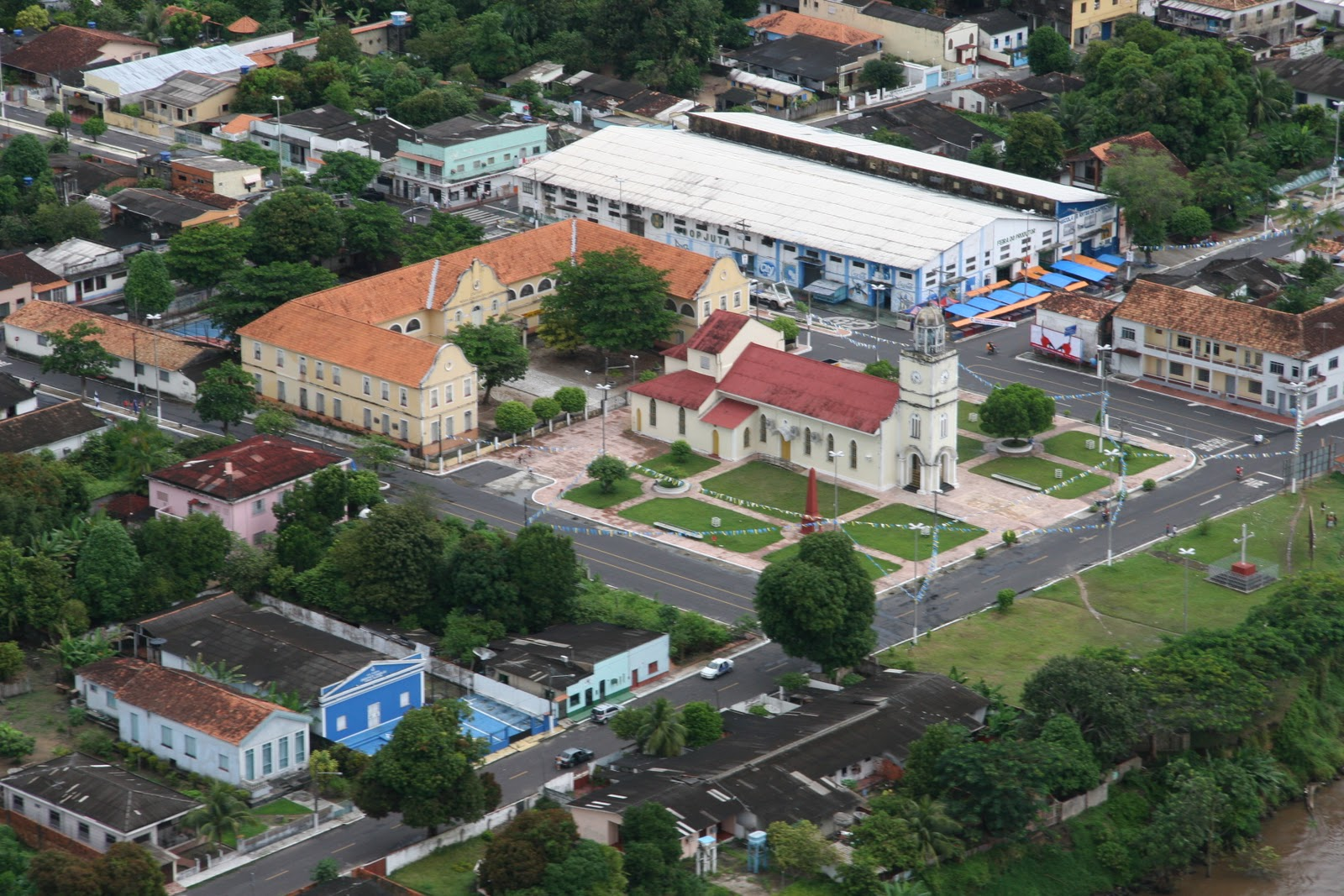
View of the center of Parintins.

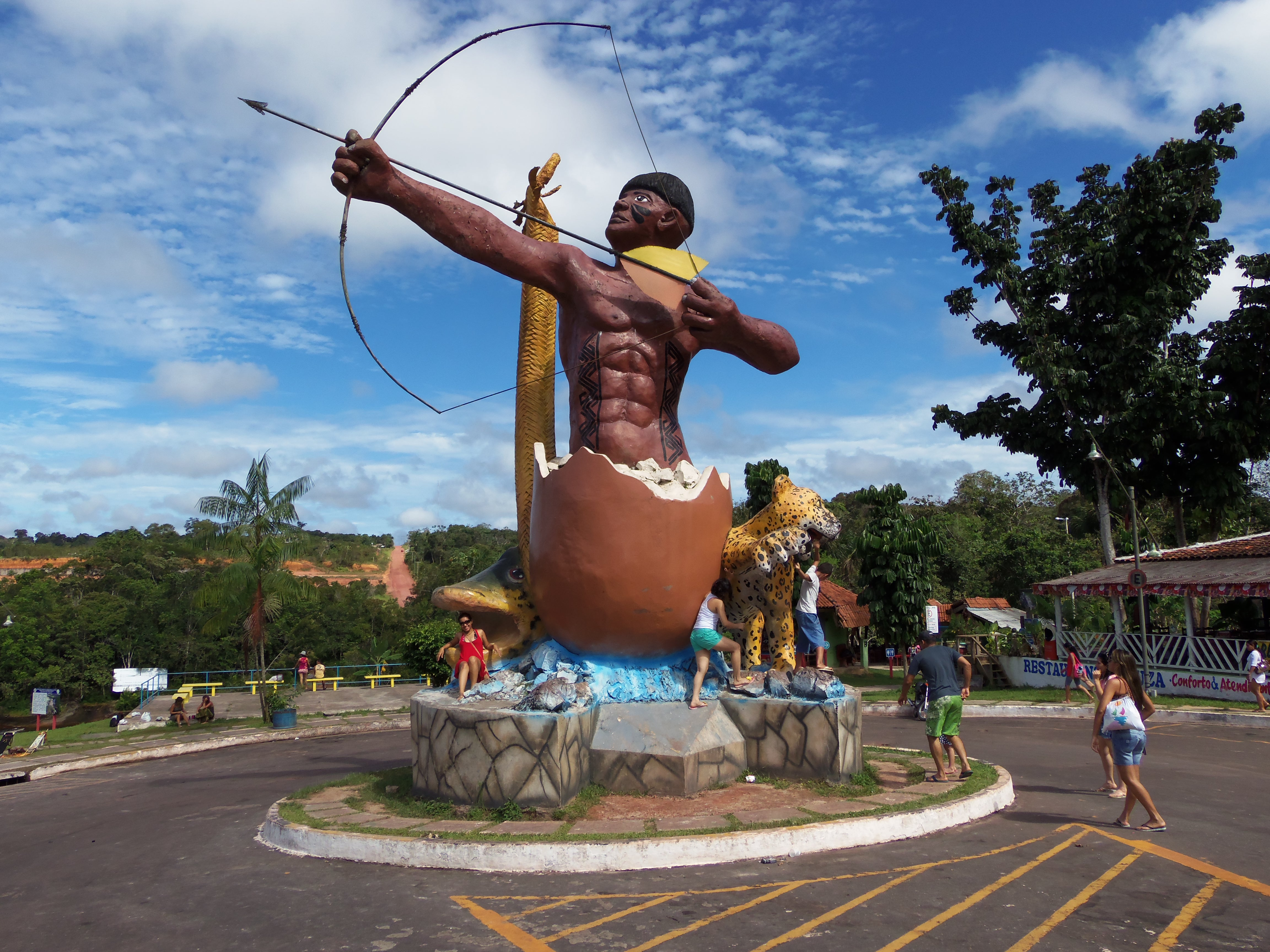
Monument in Urubuí, Presidente Figueiredo

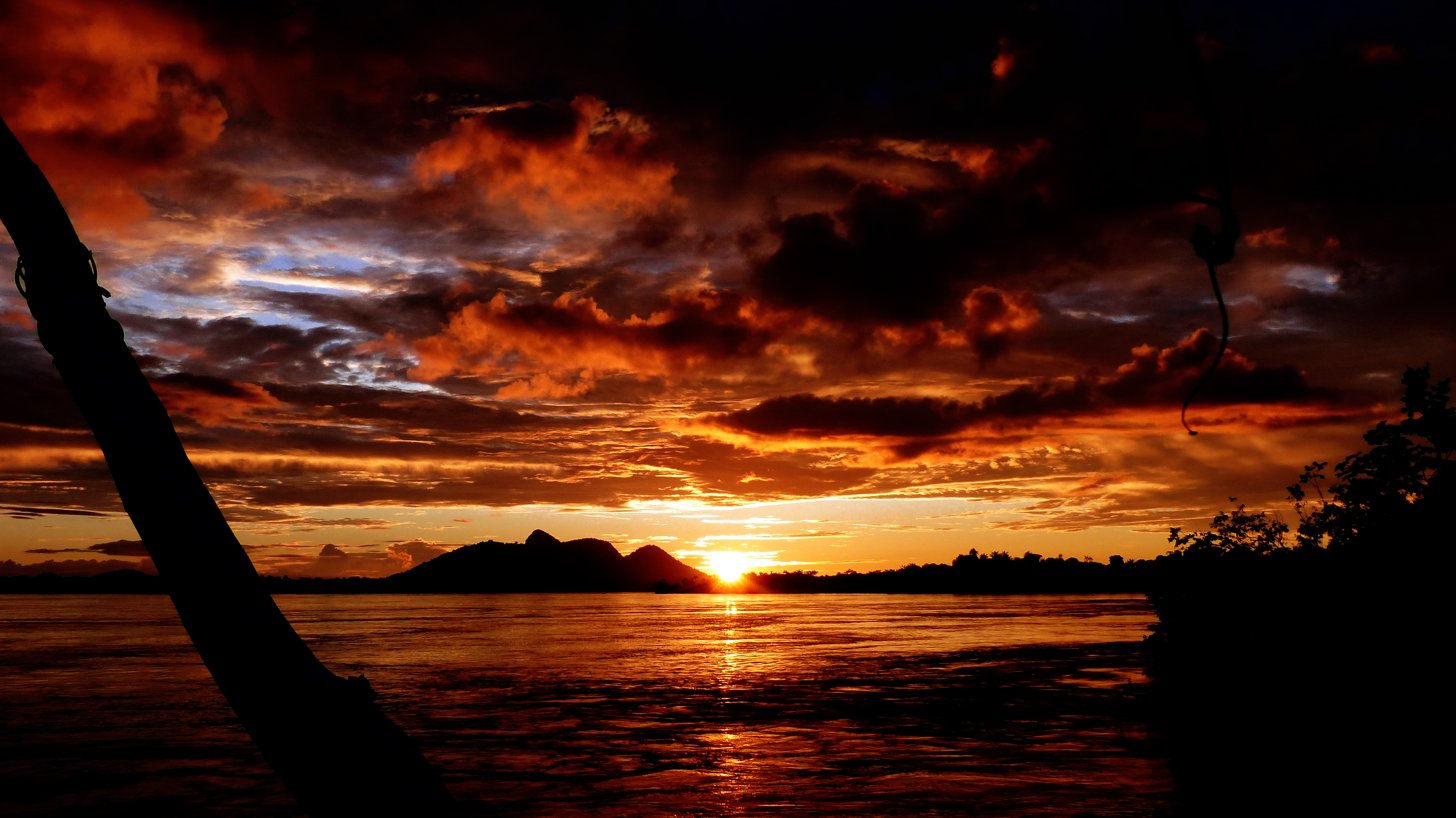
Sunset in São Gabriel da Cachoeira, a municipality nicknamed "Dog Head", in the northwest of Amazonas.

=== Categories ===
The index varies from 0 to 1, considering:

- Very high – 0.800 to 1.000
- High – 0.700 to 0.799
- Medium – 0.600 to 0.699
- Low – 0.500 to 0.599
- Very low – 0.000 to 0.499

=== Components ===
The HDI of the municipalities is an average between the income index, life expectancy index and educational index.

== List ==
Rank	Municipalities	Data of 2010				
Rank	Municipalities	HDI	Change compared to 2010 data for 2000	Income Index	Life ExpectancyIndex	Educational Index
Very high HDI
no municipality
High HDI
1	Manaus	0.737	▲0.136	0.738	0.826	0.658
Medium HDI
2	Parintins	0.658	▲0.170	0.589	0.800	0.605
3	Itapiranga	0.654	▲0.176	0.594	0.792	0.594
4	Presidente Figueiredo	0.647	▲0.110	0.627	0.802	0.538
5	Itacoatiara	0.644	▲0.153	0.618	0.811	0.534
6	Tefé	0.639	▲0.201	0.637	0.801	0.511
7	Apuí	0.637	▲0.200	0.621	0.772	0.540
8	Silves	0.632	▲0.146	0.546	0.791	0.584
9	Urucará	0.620	▲0.133	0.551	0.754	0.575
10	Tabatinga	0.616	▲0.156	0.602	0.769	0.505
11	Manacapuru	0.614	▲0.177	0.604	0.795	0.481
12	Iranduba	0.613	▲0.176	0.607	0.799	0.476
13	Rio Preto da Eva	0.611	▲0.177	0.590	0.785	0.493
14	São Gabriel da Cachoeira	0.609	▲0.131	0.610	0.777	0.476
15	Humaitá	0.605	▲0.130	0.621	0.791	0.451
Low HDI
16	Manaquiri	0.596	▲0.167	0.556	0.748	0.510
17	Anamã	0.594	▲0.186	0.537	0.741	0.526
18	Boca do Acre	0.588	▲0.187	0.576	0.777	0.455
19	Maués	0.588	▲0.134	0.549	0.800	0.464
20	Urucurituba	0.588	▲0.161	0.538	0.776	0.487
21	Coari	0.586	▲0.197	0.606	0.780	0.425
22	Nhamundá	0.586	▲0.145	0.513	0.779	0.503
23	Manicoré	0.582	▲0.184	0.580	0.747	0.456
24	Autazes	0.577	▲0.157	0.539	0.799	0.456
25	São Sebastião do Uatumã	0.577	▲0.149	0.561	0.739	0.464
26	Barreirinha	0.574	▲0.175	0.469	0.774	0.522
27	Benjamin Constant	0.574	▲0.185	0.526	0.763	0.471
28	Novo Airão	0.570	▲0.142	0.551	0.776	0.434
29	Caapiranga	0.569	▲0.166	0.544	0.775	0.436
30	Careiro da Várzea	0.569	▲0.181	0.523	0.779	0.450
31	Boa Vista do Ramos	0.565	▲0.193	0.496	0.750	0.484
32	Codajás	0.563	▲0.123	0.546	0.775	0.421
33	Eirunepé	0.563	▲0.154	0.548	0.756	0.431
34	Anori	0.561	▲0.133	0.540	0.757	0.433
35	Amaturá	0.560´	▲0.147	0.499	0.773	0.455
36	Borba	0.560	▲0.171	0.532	0.776	0.425
37	Nova Olinda do Norte	0.558	▲0.185	0.541	0.780	0.412
38	Careiro	0.557	▲0.220	0.515	0.779	0.431
39	Novo Aripuanã	0.554	▲0.167	0.532	0.759	0.421
40	Carauari	0.549	▲0.205	0.534	0.745	0.416
41	Tonantins	0.548	▲0.221	0.508	0.779	0.416
42	Guajará	0.532	▲0.151	0.510	0.762	0.387
43	Lábrea	0.531	▲0.145	0.538	0.744	0.374
44	Canutama	0.530	▲0.150	0.522	0.752	0.379
45	Fonte Boa	0.530	▲0.210	0.518	0.719	0.400
46	Alvarães	0.527	▲0.154	0.499	0.778	0.377
47	Uarini	0.527	▲0.169	0.535	0.724	0.378
48	Japurá	0.522	▲0.218	0.552	0.748	0.345
49	Juruá	0.522	▲0.160	0.538	0.704	0.376
50	São Paulo de Olivença	0.521	▲0.197	0.471	0.780	0.386
51	Jutaí	0.516	▲0.212	0.528	0.766	0.340
52	Envira	0.509	▲0.163	0.521	0.727	0.349
53	Beruri	0.506	▲0.166	0.512	0.731	0.346
54	Tapauá	0.500	▲0.209	0.545	0.728	0.315
55	Barcelos	0.500	▲0.116	0.545	0.728	0.315
Very low HDI
56	Maraã	0.498	▲0.207	0.466	0.763	0.348
57	Pauini	0.496	▲0.209	0.531	0.724	0.317
58	Santo Antônio do Içá	0.496	▲0.184	0.438	0.759	0.353
59	Ipixuna	0.481	▲0.163	0.476	0.772	0.302
60	Santa Isabel do Rio Negro	0.479	▲0.095	0.461	0.737	0.323
61	Itamarati	0.477	▲0.146	0.529	0.772	0.266
62	Atalaia do Norte	0.450	▲0.102	0.481	0.733	0.259

== See also ==
- Geography of Brazil
- List of cities in Brazil
