= Manacapuru =

Municipality of Amazonas, Brazil

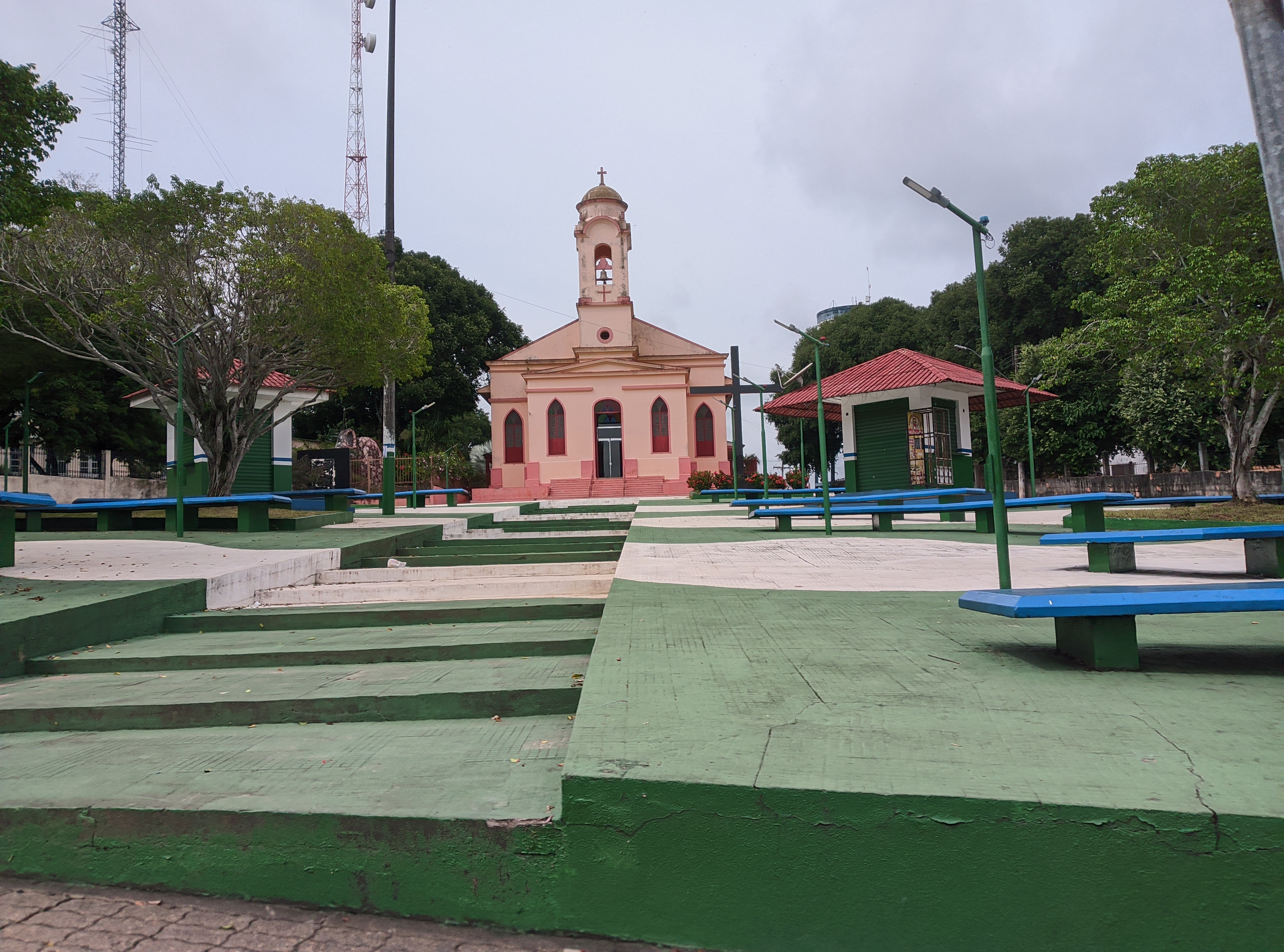
- Our Lady of Nazareth Church in Manacapuru

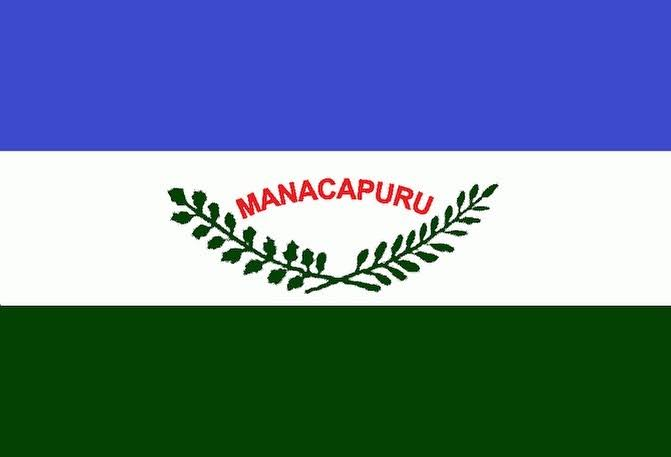
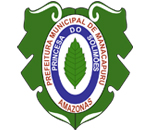
- Flag Coat of arms
- Nicknames: "Land of the Cirandas" "Land of Jute" "Princess of the Solimões" "Little Princess of the Solimões"
- Motto: Princess of the Solimões
- Location of the municipality inside Amazonas

- Location in Brazil
- Coordinates: 3°17′59″S 60°37′14″W
- Country: Brazil
- Region: North
- State: Amazonas
- Metropolitan region: Manaus Metropolitan Region
- Bordering municipalities: East: Iranduba and Manaquiri; South: Beruri; West: Anamã and Caapiranga; North/Northwest: Novo Airão.
- Distance to capital: 93 km (58 mi)
- Anniversary: July 16
- Founded: 15 February 1786; 240 years ago
- Emancipated: 16 July 1932; 94 years ago

Government
  - Body: City Council
  - Mayor: Válcileia Flores Maciel (MDB)
  - Term ends: 2028

Area
  - City: 7,336.579 km^{2} (2,832.669 sq mi)
  - Urban: 15.50 km^{2} (5.98 sq mi)
- Elevation: 60 m (200 ft)

Population (2022 Census)
  - City: 101,883
  - Estimate (2025): 111,751
  - Density: 13.89/km^{2} (36.0/sq mi)
- Demonym: Manacapuruense
- Climate: Tropical rainforest climate (Am)
- HDI (UNDP/2010): 0.614
- GDP (IBGE/2021): R$1,544,675.041
- GDP per capita (IBGE/2021): R$15,506.76
- Website: www.manacapuru.am.gov.br

Manacapuru is a Brazilian municipality in the Manaus Metropolitan Region, in the state of Amazonas. It is the third most populous city in the state with 101,883 inhabitants, according to the 2022 Brazilian Census conducted by the IBGE. Situated on the banks of the Solimões River, 93 kilometers from Manaus by road, the main access to the city is via the Manoel Urbano Highway, where the Rio Negro Bridge is located, playing a crucial role in the integration and development of Greater Manaus.

The municipality covers an area of 7,336.579 km^{2}, representing 0.4705% of the Amazonas state area, 0.1903% of the Northern Region, and 0.0862% of the entire Brazilian territory. Manacapuru has an average annual minimum temperature of 24 °C and a maximum of 35 °C. The vegetation, typical of the Amazon region, consists of floodplain and upland forests, with a landscape of lakes, islets, and a small hill range surrounding it.

Founded in 1786, it originated from a Mura indigenous village, pacified in 1785, which settled on the left bank of the Solimões River in the 18th century, giving rise to the locality. Manacapuru is nationally known as the Little Princess of the Solimões, a nickname it has held since the mid-19th century. Many of its natural attractions are nationally recognized, as is its traditional cultural festival, the Manacapuru Ciranda Festival, making the municipality one of the most visited by tourists in the Amazon.

Manacapuru has the third largest GDP in Amazonas, accounting for 1.35% of the state's total GDP. Its Human Development Index (HDI) is 0.614, considered below the national average but medium compared to the HDI of the state, which was 0.674. In 2022, the municipality had 66 healthcare facilities (hospitals, primary healthcare units, and medical clinics). Its patron saint is Our Lady of Nazareth, and the Our Lady of Nazareth Church is the city's main landmark.

== Etymology ==
Manacapuru is a word of indigenous origin, derived from the terms Manacá and Puru. Manacá is a Brazilian dicotyledonous plant belonging to the Solanaceae family. In Tupi-Guarani, the word means "flower." The word "Puru" has the same origin but means "ornamented" or "variegated." Thus, in Tupi-Guarani, Manacapuru translates to Variegated Flower.

Another possible translation of the municipality's name comes from the Mura language, also meaning "Variegated Flower." The name Manacapuru refers to a fierce female warrior leader who ruled this nation on the left bank of the Solimões River, where the city now stands.

== History ==
The Mura people, the original inhabitants of the region, occupied the area of present-day Manacapuru as early as the 17th century. The Mura were known to the Portuguese as warlike and hostile, which led to wars waged by Portuguese settlers starting in 1774, under the command of Matias Fernandes and the director of the Santo Antônio do Imaripi village, located in Japurá, far from the region.

Due to the significant distance from Japurá to the Mura's location, by 1785, a fishing post called Caldeirão existed on the banks of the Solimões River, just below the mouth of the Manacapuru River, with its production intended to supply the military garrison stationed in Barcelos, then the seat of the captaincy. The fishing post was managed by Sebastião Pereira de Castro.

Sebastião Pereira de Castro reported to General Pereira Caldas a large migration of Mura people from other regions to the area. According to Castro, on September 27 of that year, a "large number of Mura people" arrived, wishing to settle in the vicinity. In response, General Pereira Caldas recommended relocating the indigenous people to the village of Anamã—later to become a municipality—or another place designated by the administrator. The chosen location for the Mura settlement was the bank of Lake Manacapuru. There, approximately 290 Mura people settled on February 15, 1786, establishing the settlement named Manacapuru after the lake.

=== Administrative formation ===
The Parish of Our Lady of Nazareth of Manacapuru was established on August 12, 1865, by Law No. 148, with its seat in the Manacapuru village. By Law No. 83 of September 27, 1894, the municipality of Manacapuru was created, with territory separated from the municipality of Manaus. Its establishment occurred on June 16, 1895.

The Manacapuru District was created by Law No. 354 of September 10, 1901. By Law No. 1,126 of November 5, 1921, the district was abolished, only to be reestablished the following year, in 1922, by Law No. 1,133 of February 7. The municipality was granted city status on July 16, 1932, by State Act No. 1,639.

Under the administrative division in effect in December 1959, the municipality comprised three districts: Manacapuru, Beruri, and Caapiranga, all of which have since been emancipated.

Currently, the municipality has only one district, Caviana, which also had a proposal for emancipation in 2010, along with twenty-seven other districts in the state of Amazonas.

=== Recent history ===
Due to Manacapuru's demographic growth, currently the fourth most populous city in Amazonas and one of the largest in population in the Northern Region, the municipality was included in the Manaus Metropolitan Region on December 27, 2007.

It currently has an area of 7,329 square kilometers. Its Human Development Index (HDI) is 0.663.

== Geography ==
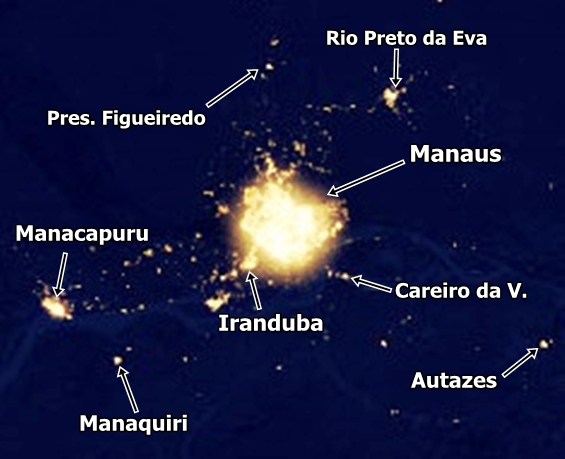
Satellite image at night showing Manacapuru integrated into the conurbation process of Greater Manaus.

The municipality of Manacapuru is located on the left bank of the Solimões River, at the confluence with the Manacapuru River, southwest of the capital of Amazonas, 93 km by road from it. Its geographic coordinates are 3° 18' 15" south latitude and 60° 37' 03" west longitude.

The territory has significant aquatic, floral, and faunal potential. It was the first municipality in Amazonas to establish a Municipal Conservation Unit System (SMUC)—the Piranha Sustainable Development Reserve—along with the Miriti Environmental Protection Area and the Paru and Calado Lakes Maintenance Area.

The vegetation is almost entirely characterized by floodplain and upland areas, heavily influenced by these environments.

=== Bordering municipalities ===
Manacapuru borders six municipalities, namely: Iranduba and Manaquiri to the east; Beruri to the south; Anamã and Caapiranga to the west; and Novo Airão to the north and northwest.

Border with Iranduba

The border with Iranduba begins at the headwaters of the Açú Stream, the watershed between the Negro and Manacapuru rivers. This watershed extends southeast, reaching the headwaters of the Anta Stream, along its midline, until it meets Lake Aracapuri. From there, the Açú Stream, separating the two municipalities, extends to Lake Ubim. In the northern region of the municipality, the dividing line with Iranduba is the highway, which connects Manaus to Novo Airão. In this region, the divider is also the Ariaú Paraná, a lake that flows into the Solimões River.

Border with Manaquiri

The border between Manacapuru and Manaquiri begins on the right bank of the Solimões River, ascending along this bank to Lake Paraná do Barroso, at the westernmost part of Barroso Island. From there, the boundary is a line crossing the Paraná do Lago Grande village, reaching Lake Grande. From this lake, the divider becomes the Solimões River again, ending at Lake Manaquiri and the source of the Sucuri Stream.

Border with Beruri

Manacapuru's border with Beruri also begins at the source of the Sucuri Stream. After the Sucuri Stream, the territorial divider becomes the Pupunha Stream, which separates the boundaries along a midline, reaching the Acarituba, Papagaio, and Baruri lakes. From there, the territorial divider becomes the Solimões River.

Border with Anamã

It begins on the right bank of the Solimões River, at the westernmost part of Iauara Island, descending the river along the western bank. From there, the territorial divider between Manacapuru and Anamã becomes a midline, reaching its intersection with the parallel of 3º 30' south.

Border with Caapiranga

It starts at the parallel of 3º 30' south. This parallel, to the northeast, reaches the source of the Cuité Stream. Other dividers used for the territorial boundaries between Manacapuru and Caapiranga include the Cabaliana, Paraná do Anamã, Campina, Cláudio, and Piraí lakes, and the Manacapuru and Solimões rivers.

Border with Novo Airão

The border between the two municipalities begins at the Piraí Stream and reaches the Petrobras Station Stream. The Manacapuru River is used as the boundary between the two municipalities after the Petrobras Stream ends. Finally, the Rio Negro marks the geographic and territorial boundary between Manacapuru and Novo Airão.

=== Climate ===
Manacapuru has a tropical rainforest climate, prevalent throughout the Amazon. The climate is moderated by high rainfall and trade winds blowing from the Atlantic Ocean. Temperature drops are common in the municipality, significantly reducing heat intensity, especially at night. There are two distinct seasons: winter, starting in December, and summer, starting in May.

Between April 1958 and December 1960, the highest recorded temperature in Manacapuru was 35.8 °C, observed on October 15, 1958. The lowest was 18.1 °C, on July 21, 1958. During this period, the highest 24-hour rainfall accumulation was 94 mm, on December 29, 1958.

Average temperature and precipitation in Manacapuru
Month					May								Year
Average High Temperature °C	30.7	30.8	30.8	30.8	30.8	30.9	31.3	32.4	32.7	35.1	32.1	31.4	32.5
Average Temperature °C	26.2	26.0	26.1	26.1	26.1	26.1	26.7	27.4	28.5	29.3	28.4	27.7	27.6
Average Low Temperature °C	22.9	23.0	23.1	23.1	23.1	22.8	22.5	22.8	23.2	23.4	23.5	23.3	22.8
Average Precipitation mm	285.9	274.7	328.9	287.1	202.4	107.2	67.7	44.2	69.2	121.6	166.3	227.8	2012.2

=== Hydrography ===
Manacapuru is located within the Amazon hydrographic basin. The rivers flowing through Manacapuru are the Solimões and Manacapuru rivers, the latter giving the city its name. The Solimões River originates in Peru and, upon entering Brazil in the municipality of Tabatinga, is named Solimões.

In addition to the Solimões and Manacapuru rivers, the municipality is bathed by the Purus and Jará rivers.

=== Fauna and flora ===
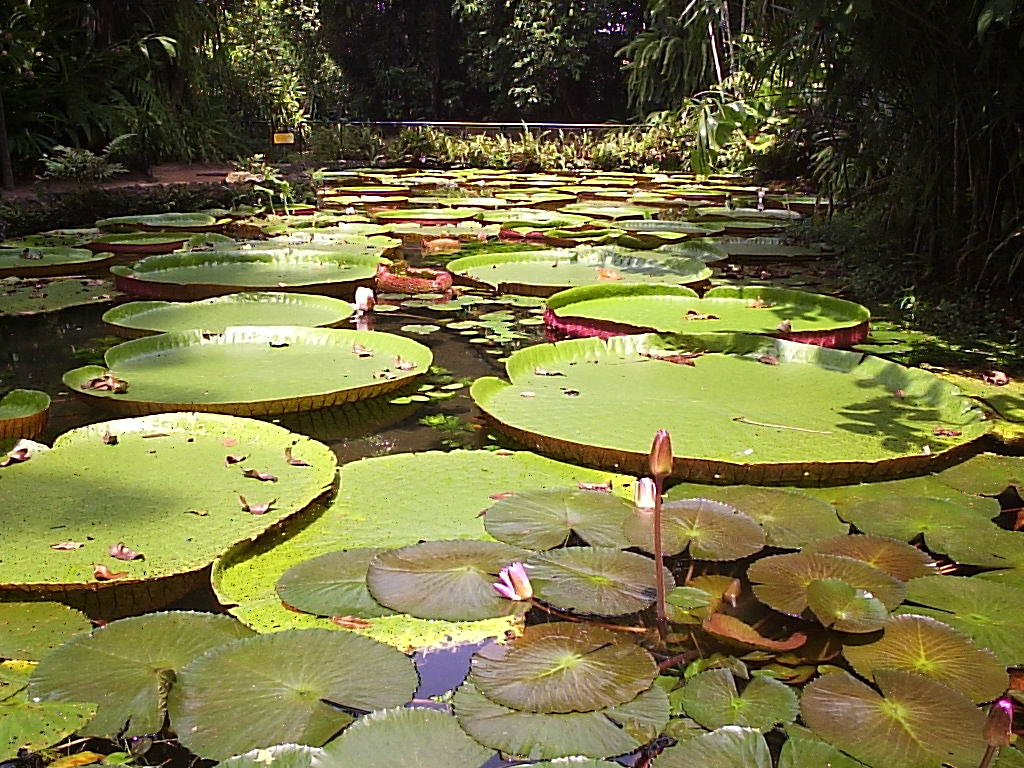
Victoria amazonica, the second-largest waterlily in the world.

The fauna and flora of the Amazon are highly diverse, with the same tropical rainforest fauna found in various municipalities. Manacapuru is home to numerous species of plants and birds, countless amphibians, and millions of insects.

Large aquatic mammals, such as the manatee and boto, are found mainly in areas with minimal movement in the Rio Negro. The municipality's hydrography is privileged, especially at the border with Novo Airão, known as the "land of the manatee." Some Amazonian trees, such as the andiroba and kapok, are found in some city areas, especially in untouched regions. In the urban area, such trees are scarce. Reptiles such as turtles, caimans, and vipers also inhabit the area. There are birds and fish of all species, plumages, and skins. In some areas along the rivers, Victoria amazonica is found, with circular leaves reaching over one meter in diameter.

== Demography ==
According to the 2022 Brazilian Census conducted by the IBGE, the municipality's population was 101,883 inhabitants, making it the 3rd most populous in the state with a population density of 13.89 inhabitants per km^{2}. According to the 2022 Brazilian Census, 51.02% of the population was male (51,978) and 48.98% was female (49,905), with a median population age of 25 years.

Manacapuru's population growth compared to the 2010 Census was 19.66%. Over nine years, between 1991 and 2000, the population had an average annual growth rate of 2.97%, rising from 57,173 inhabitants in 1991 to 73,695 inhabitants in 2000. In contrast, the urbanization rate grew by only 2.66%, from 63% urbanization in 1991 to 64.67% in 2000. In 2000, the municipality's population accounted for 2.62% of the state's population and 0.04% of the country's population.

During the same period from 1991 to 2000, there was a decline in the dependency ratio. In 1991, the dependency ratio among inhabitants was very high at 107.6%. By 2000, this index dropped to 85% of inhabitants.

Manacapuru's Municipal Human Development Index (HDI) is considered medium by the United Nations Development Programme (UNDP). In 2000, considering only education, the index was 0.761, while Brazil's was 0.849. The health index was 0.684 (Brazil's was 0.787), and the income index was 0.544 (Brazil's was 0.723). Compared to other Brazilian municipalities, Manacapuru has an intermediate situation, ranking 3,555th in HDI, with 3,554 municipalities (64.5%) in a better situation and 1,952 municipalities (35.5%) in a worse or similar situation. Compared to Amazonas municipalities, Manacapuru has a reasonable situation: it ranks 15th, with 14 municipalities (22.6%) in a better situation and 47 municipalities (77.4%) in a worse or similar situation. From 1991 to 2000, Manacapuru's HDI grew by 11.24%, from 0.596 in 1991 to 0.663 in 2000. Longevity contributed most to this growth, with 51.2%, followed by education, with 49.8%. If Manacapuru maintained this HDI growth rate, it would take 26 years to reach São Caetano do Sul, the municipality with the highest HDI in Brazil (0.919), and 12 years to reach Manaus, the municipality with the highest HDI in the state (0.774).

=== Ethnic composition ===
The cultural, political, and economic traits inherited from the Portuguese, Spaniards, and Dutch mark the municipality of Manacapuru. However, the significant contribution of indigenous peoples to its ethnic makeup cannot be overlooked. The indigenous peoples initiated human occupation in the Amazon, and their descendants, the caboclos, developed in close contact with the environment, adapting to regional peculiarities and opportunities offered by the forest.

In its historical formation, Manacapuru's demography results from the miscegenation of the three basic ethnic groups that make up the Brazilian population: the indigenous, the European, and the African, forming the region's mestiços (caboclos). Later, with the arrival of immigrants, especially Japanese and Jews from Morocco, a unique cultural blend was formed, characterizing the city's population, values, and way of life. The city is home to a notable Moroccan community, mostly Jewish.

According to the 2022 Brazilian Census by the IBGE, the population of Manacapuru is composed of the following groups: mixed race (82.93%, or 84,487 people), white (12.39%, or 12,620 people), black (3.83%, or 3,898 people), indigenous (0.81%, or 830 people), and Asian (0.05%, or 48 people).

=== Religion ===
Cultural diversity is evident in Manacapuru, with various religious manifestations present. Like many Brazilian municipalities, the city developed on a predominantly Catholic social matrix, and today, numerous Protestant denominations can be found. The growth of those identifying as non-religious is also notable, accounting for 6.09% of the city's religious population in 2000. Manacapuru is located in the world's most Catholic country in absolute numbers. The Catholic Church had its legal status recognized by the federal government in October 2009, although Brazil is currently an officially secular state.

According to 2000 census data from the Brazilian Institute of Geography and Statistics, Manacapuru's population is composed of: Catholics (65.68%), evangelicals (25.73%), non-religious (6.09%), Buddhists (0.01%), and 2.14% are divided among other religions. Among Protestant denominations, the Assemblies of God (15.36%), Baptist Church (2.09%), and Seventh-day Adventist Church (1.72%) stand out. Among restorationist Christian denominations, The Church of Jesus Christ of Latter-day Saints (1.16%) and Jehovah's Witnesses (0.40%) are notable. Spiritism, Judaism, Umbanda, and Candomblé were not identified among the religious population.

== Politics ==
=== Administration ===
According to the 1988 Constitution, Manacapuru is located in a republic federative presidential system. It was inspired by the American model, but the Brazilian legal system follows the Roman-Germanic tradition of positive law. Municipal administration is carried out by the executive branch and the legislative branch.

The executive branch is represented by the mayor and a cabinet of secretaries, in accordance with the model proposed by Article 29 of the Constitution of Brazil.

The legislative branch consists of the municipal chamber, composed of twenty-one councilors elected for four-year terms (in accordance with Article 29 of the Constitution) and is structured as follows: seven seats for Republicans; seven seats for MDB; two seats for Progressistas; five seats for the Social Democratic Party (PSD); and one seat each for the Liberal Party (PL) and União Brasil. The chamber is responsible for drafting and voting on fundamental laws for administration and the executive, particularly the participatory budget (Budget Guidelines Law). The municipality of Manacapuru is governed by organic laws. The comarca of Manacapuru was created in September 1901, abolished twenty years later in 1921, and reestablished in 1922.

The current mayor of Manacapuru is Valcileia Maciel, affiliated with MDB, who has been in office since January 1, 2025, having been elected on October 6, 2024, with over 71% of valid votes, for a term from January 1, 2025, to January 1, 2029.

== Economy ==
The economy is characterized primarily by the collection of rubber and Brazil nut, hunting, fishing, extensive livestock farming in natural fields, and nascent itinerant agriculture in upland areas, with notable growth in jute and black pepper cultivation in recent years. In Manacapuru, although animal and plant extractive industries are significant sources of wealth, agriculture, particularly jute cultivation, forms the economic backbone of the municipality.

Agricultural production
Product	Quantity (t)
Cassava	31,622
Banana	1,666
Corn	1,344
Orange	692
Bean	17

=== Primary sector ===
Agriculture in Manacapuru is one of the main economic sources. The municipality is the largest national producer of jute, with significant production of other crops such as cassava, banana, corn, orange, bean, coffee, and vegetables.Livestock and fishing also constitute strong economic activities in the municipality, with emphasis on cattle, horse, and pig farming. In 2009, 20,568 cattle, 639 buffalo, and 294 horses were recorded in the municipality. In fishing, the most common species are pacu, sardine, curimata, prochilodus, brycon, and other freshwater fish species.

Poultry farming also represents an economic activity for the city, with a farm dedicated to laying hens. Vegetable extractivism remains a significant activity for the local economy, through the exploitation of products such as rubber, pupunha, and timber. There are several fish farms in the area, focused on raising Amazonian fish species. In terms of fruit farming, the municipality produces passion fruit, cupuaçu, papaya, pineapple, banana, avocado, orange, lemon, and watermelon.

=== Secondary sector ===
Industrial production in the municipality is closely tied to agriculture and local extractive industries. There are industries focused on agribusiness, production of non-metallic minerals, metallurgy, mechanics, electrical materials, transportation equipment, timber, furniture, paper, rubber, leather, pharmaceuticals and veterinary products, plastics, textiles, clothing, beverages, tobacco, publishing, printing, footwear, and construction.

In 2008, there were 918 registered companies in the municipality, according to the IBGE, generating approximately 4,850 direct jobs.

=== Tertiary sector ===
The municipality maintains commercial transactions with the markets of Manaus and Belém. Among the imported products, food items, fabrics, medicines, hardware, and electrical materials are prominent. According to 2008 data, the municipal seat has 918 commercial establishments, generating approximately 4,850 direct jobs with salaries of R$71,537, an average of 3.3 minimum wages.

== Urban structure ==
=== Housing, basic infrastructure, and security ===
Manacapuru has a reasonable infrastructure. In 2000, the city had 13,351 dwellings including apartments, houses, and rooms. Of these, 11,608 were owned properties, with 11,545 fully paid (86.47%), 63 in acquisition (0.47%), and 678 rented (5.08%); 1,010 properties were provided, with 326 by employers (2.44%) and 684 provided otherwise (5.12%). 55 were occupied in other ways (0.41%). Some of these residences have access to treated water, electricity, sewage, urban cleaning, fixed telephony, and mobile telephony. In 2000, 50.56% of dwellings were served by the general water supply network; 57.26% of homes had garbage collection and only 9.16% of residences had sanitary sewage systems.

Between 1991 and 2000, access to consumer goods was considered low. In 1991, only 34.6% of residences had refrigerators; 39.5% had televisions; 8.3% had telephones, and none had computers. By 2000, these figures increased: 57.5% of residences had refrigerators; 62.6% had televisions; 8.5% had telephones, and 0.9% had computers.

Under the 1988 Brazilian Constitution, the Manacapuru Municipal Guard, along with the Military Police, is responsible for protecting public goods, services, and facilities. Additionally, in the public interest and in exercising its police powers, it acts to prevent and suppress certain crimes, particularly against public goods and services, and can arrest offenders in flagrante delicto and bring them before a police chief, as provided by criminal procedure law.

Crime in Manacapuru is on the rise, as in other Brazilian municipalities. In 2006, the homicide rate was 9.7 per 100,000 inhabitants, up from 8.8 in 2005. The rate of deaths by firearm, after significant growth between 2002 and 2005, fell in 2006 to 4.5 per 100,000 inhabitants. The rate of deaths from traffic accidents, which was 1 per 100,000 inhabitants in 2002, rose to 12 per 100,000 inhabitants in 2006.

=== Healthcare and education ===
The municipality has twenty-four healthcare facilities, all of which are public and municipal. There are no private healthcare facilities. Of the twenty-four facilities, fifteen provide dental services and operate as primary healthcare units.

Manacapuru has schools in all regions of the municipality. In 2009, the municipality had approximately 22,429 enrollments, 727 teachers, and 171 schools in public and private networks, with 19 state schools and 150 municipal schools. Twenty-three municipal schools offered preschool activities.

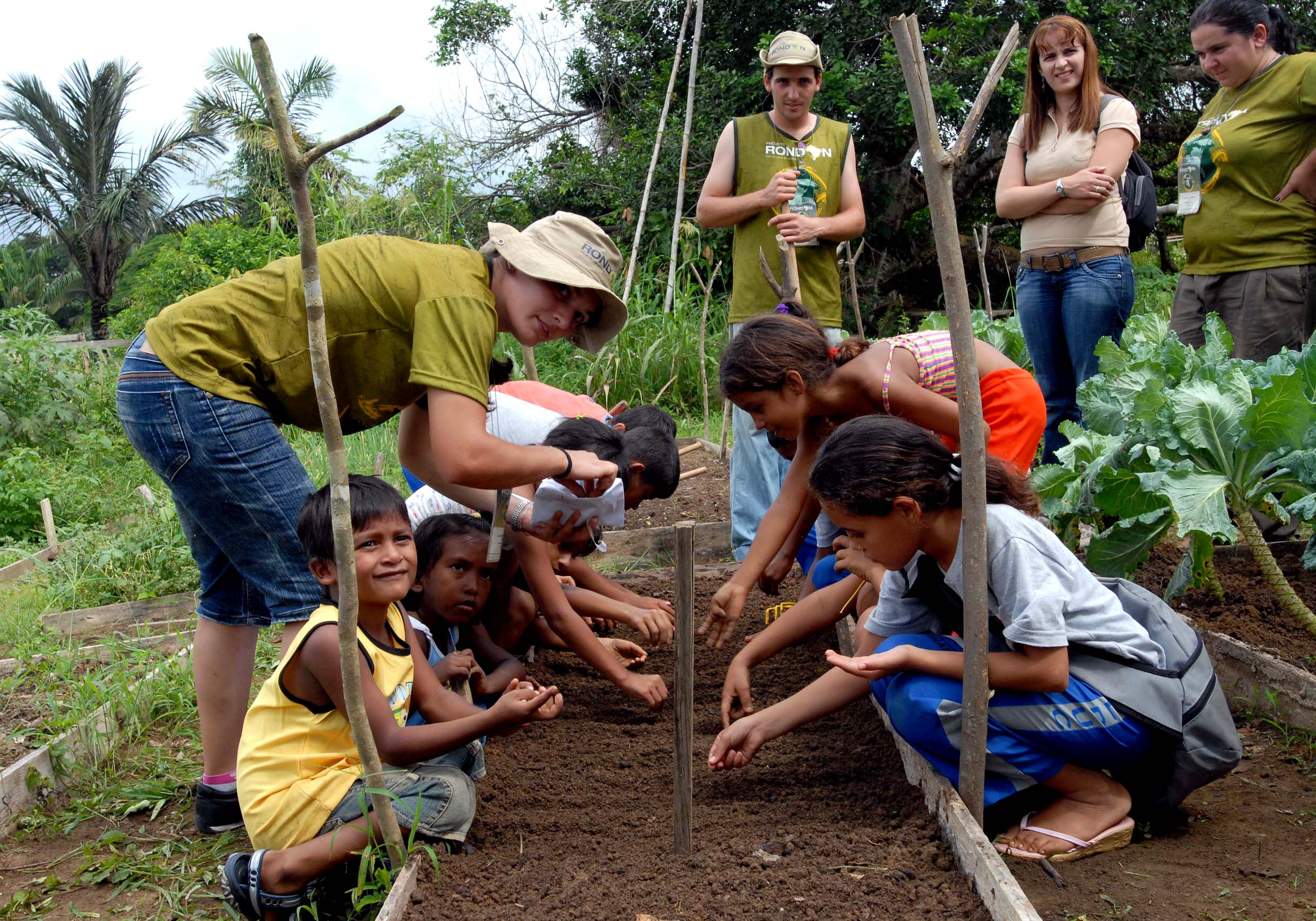
Horticulture workshop of the Rondon Project in Manacapuru (2009).

In terms of higher education, the municipality has a campus of the University of the State of Amazonas (UEA), a FAMETRO college, and a medical school belonging to Afya/Itpac. Manacapuru is home to the Metropolitan Center for Higher Studies of UEA (CMESU-UEA). The Metropolitan Center offers courses in Naval Engineering, Fishing Engineering, Food Production, Fiber Production, and Archaeology at the University of the State of Amazonas, emphasizing these programs to meet the specific demands of Novo Airão, a regional naval industry hub, Iranduba, with significant archaeological sites, and Manacapuru, Brazil's largest producer of plant fiber.

Manacapuru is one of the host cities of the Rondon Project, a Brazilian government initiative coordinated by the Ministry of Defence, in collaboration with the Secretariat of Higher Education of the Ministry of Education.

== Services and communications ==
The municipality is supplied with electricity by the Balbina Dam, located in Balbina, a district of the municipality of Presidente Figueiredo. Together with the Samuel Hydroelectric Dam, Balbina supplies much of the municipalities in Western Amazon. The distribution of electricity in the municipality is provided by Amazonas Energia.

The water supply service for the entire city is managed by the Water and Sewage Service (SAAE). Sewage collection is carried out by the municipal government itself. Dial-up and broadband (ADSL) internet services are offered by various free and paid access providers. Mobile telephone services are provided by several operators. The area code (DDD) for Manacapuru is 092, and the city's postal code (CEP) is 99825-000.

Manacapuru receives free-to-air television signals from various Brazilian broadcasters. Among the regional broadcasters airing programs related to the municipality, notable ones include Rede Calderaro de Comunicação, which broadcasts TV A Crítica; Grupo Norte de Comunicação, which airs TV Norte Amazonas, an affiliate of SBT; and Rede Amazônica, affiliated with Rede Globo.

== Transportation ==
The municipality has a strong tradition of water-based transportation due to the abundance of rivers that traverse the area. However, with the establishment of the Manaus Metropolitan Region in 2007, road transportation has gained greater significance within its territorial boundaries. Like other municipalities in Amazonas, Manacapuru is not served by railways. Public transportation in Manacapuru, as in the entire Manaus Metropolitan Region, is managed by the Greater Manaus Urban Transport Superintendence (STU-RMM). Air transportation is also used, though to a lesser extent.

=== Waterways ===
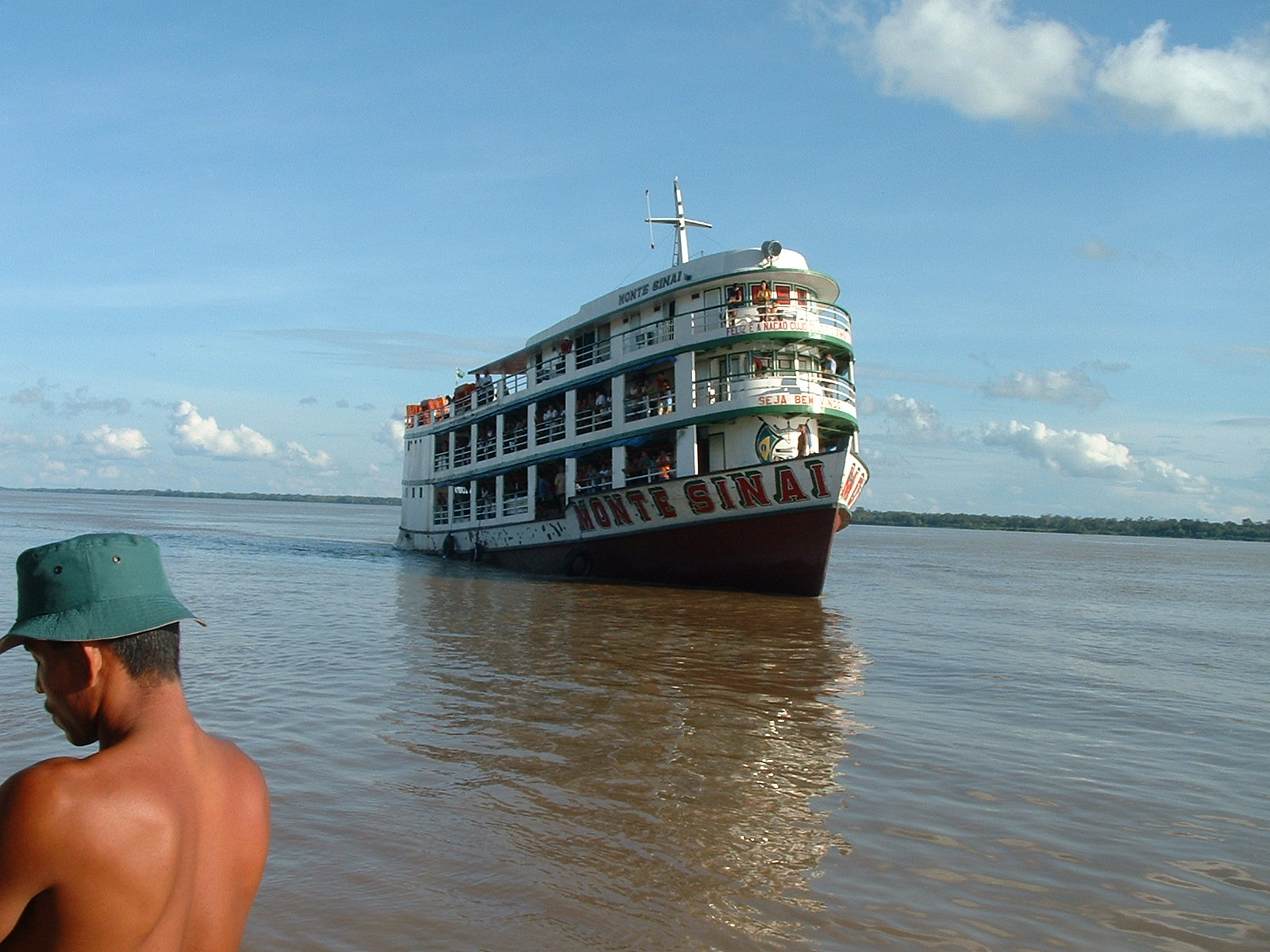
Boat on the Amazon River. River transport in this region is very common due to the scarcity of roads.

The Amazonian rivers remain, as they were during the colonial period of Brazil, the main routes of access in this region. River navigation is highly active in Amazonas, home to the world's largest river by water volume, the Amazon River. Smaller rivers in the region, such as the Juruá and Purus, are navigable up to their headwaters. The types of watercraft used in the region range from small boats to cruise ships. Sail-powered vessels handle much of the traffic to the capital, Manaus, and other rural areas of the municipality. The Manacapuru River Terminal, managed by SNPH, is one of the largest in Northern Brazil.

=== Roads ===
The only highways in Manacapuru are AM-070, which connects Manacapuru to Manaus, Iranduba, and Manaquiri; and AM-254, which links Manaus to Novo Airão, passing through Manacapuru. Regarding the vehicle fleet, in 2009, a total of 12,492 vehicles were recorded. There are also public transportation companies that provide services to rural communities in the municipality. Access to Manaus is primarily via AM-070, where the Rio Negro Bridge is located, along with four other bridges—two over the Ariaú River and two over the Miriti River. The journey takes approximately one hour by car, and there is a bus service between the two cities with thirteen daily trips.

== Culture and society ==
The culture of the municipality, like that of Amazonas, has been heavily influenced by the indigenous peoples of the region and by various groups of immigrants and migrants, particularly Spaniards, who settled there. Manacapuru has become a city with extensive cultural blending and diverse traditions. Northeasterners who migrated to the Amazon in the late 19th century and early 20th century, drawn by the Rubber boom, also contributed significantly to the formation of the municipal culture. This has resulted in a mestiço culture in the region and the state, with a significant and enduring contribution from indigenous culture.

Manacapuru's culture is rich in traditions and highly appreciated folk festivals. Due to the Ciranda Festival, which in recent years has attracted a large number of tourists to the city, Manacapuru has become known as the "Land of Cirandas".

In music, the highlights are ciranda and forró. Manacapuru hosts a project called "Caravana da Música," which features the participation of various regional and national artists.

=== Ciranda Festival ===
Like Parintins, Manacapuru is also known for its folk festival, but instead of the characteristic boi-bumbá of Parintins, the city is renowned for its cirandas, groups that perform a typical local music style and hold competitive parades. The Manacapuru Ciranda Festival is held annually at the city's Cirandódromo, located in Parque do Ingá, typically during the last weekend of August or the beginning of September.

The first competitive Ciranda Festival took place in 1997. Since then, this cultural manifestation has been recognized as a folk tradition, improving in quality and technical level with each passing year.

The festival features three groups: Flor Matizada, Guerreiros Mura, and Tradicional. The Manacapuru Ciranda Festival is one of the largest in the state of Amazonas and in Northern Brazil, attracting between 50,000 and 90,000 tourists annually.

=== Tourism ===
Manacapuru is one of the top tourist destinations in Amazonas, attracting a large number of visitors to its nearby beaches, lakes, and streams, which are home to several jungle lodges.

Ecotourism, also known as nature tourism, draws thousands of tourists to the municipality. Among the city's natural attractions, the Manacapuru Ecological Reserve stands out, featuring typical floodplain vegetation with giant trees such as the kapok. It is a migratory and breeding area for birds and one of the best locations for sport fishing due to the variety of fish, including piranha and bonytongue. The reserve includes a floating hotel and an observatory for birds, alligators, and other wildlife. It is located on the left bank of the Solimões River.

The Sahu-Apé Indigenous Community is another natural attraction in the area, where indigenous spices can be found. Santo Afonso Island, located on the Solimões River, is also a popular natural attraction.

The Port Pier, in the city center, is one of the main tourist attractions, serving as a historic and regional port.

The century-old Our Lady of Nazareth Church is the most iconic landmark of Manacapuru. A symbol of the city's religious and educational heritage, it was built through community collaboration and solidarity and is one of the ten parishes of the Coari Prelature.

The church underwent several renovations that improved and expanded its structure over time. Before the current temple was built, religious services were held in a modest chapel constructed in the early 19th century, located where the 16 de Julho Square now stands. Initially, the chapel was a community initiative, with locals responsible for its maintenance and religious services. The construction of the Our Lady of Nazareth Church began in 1904 and was completed in 1907. The Ventura family played a significant role in supporting the construction.

Investments in the project came from contributions by successful local merchants and through cultural fairs and festivals. Some of the construction materials were sourced from the state capital, while many bricks were purchased from the municipality of Coari.

The materials used are of high quality, as evidenced by the enduring original structure. The tiles that adorned the chapel's altar for many years were imported from Portugal, though they were removed during the last renovation in 2007 to improve the floor quality.

The community's spirit of collaboration was so strong that when construction materials arrived at the city's port by boat, residents—men, women, and children—cheerfully transported them to the construction site, eager to see the project completed.

The canoe-shaped altar in the church was used during a Mass celebrated by Pope John Paul II when he visited Manaus in 1980.

Redemptorist priests were responsible for organizing the community that later became the Our Lady of Nazareth Parish.

The Municipal Chamber, which housed the Executive Branch, the State Revenue Office, and the Court of Justice during the 1930s, became the permanent seat of the Manacapuru Municipal Chamber in 1976, and the building was named Antero de Rezende Palace. The Our Lady of Nazareth School, with construction beginning in 1946 and completed in 1951, features an architectural design inspired by European styles. It was built with funds from the mission, the Brazilian government, and contributions from the local community, which also provided labor. The Court of Justice Building, constructed in the early 1930s by Francisco do Couto Valle, was originally intended as a municipal jail and later served as a hotel. From 1991 to 1993, it housed the Municipal Health Secretariat before becoming the permanent seat of the Manacapuru Municipal Chamber's Court of Justice. Other notable buildings include the Municipal Prefecture, one of the city's oldest structures, and the Freemasonry lodge.

=== Football ===
In football, the main club in Manacapuru is the Princesa do Solimões Esporte Clube, founded on August 18, 1971. Its headquarters are located on Getúlio Vargas Avenue in the Historic Center of Manacapuru. Princesa do Solimões played its first official match in the inaugural Amazonas Football Championship in 1987, becoming the third club from the Amazonas inland to participate in the event, following Penarol from Itacoatiara and Olaria from Humaitá. A significant talent developer, the club has produced several stars of northern football, such as Naílton, Zédvan, and Alcimar. Known as the "Tubarão do Solimões" (Solimões Shark) among Amazonas residents, the club's symbol is a shark. It won the Amazonas Football Championship in 2013 but finished as runner-up six times (1995, 1997, 2014, 2015, 2016, and 2022). The club also won the Torneio Início in 1997 and 2007. It has participated, and occasionally still does, in regional and national competitions such as the Copa Verde, the Campeonato Brasileiro Série D, the Second Division of the Brazilian Championship (1989), and the Copa do Brasil.

Another Manacapuru club to reach professional football is Operário, founded on June 10, 1982. The club turned professional in 2010, winning the Amazonas Championship Série B in its debut year and reaching Série A in less than two years.

== Notable people ==
- Marcelinho – Footballer, playing for the Bulgaria national football team.

== See also ==
- List of municipalities in Amazonas by HDI
