= Anamã =

Municipality of Amazonas, Brazil

- Municipality
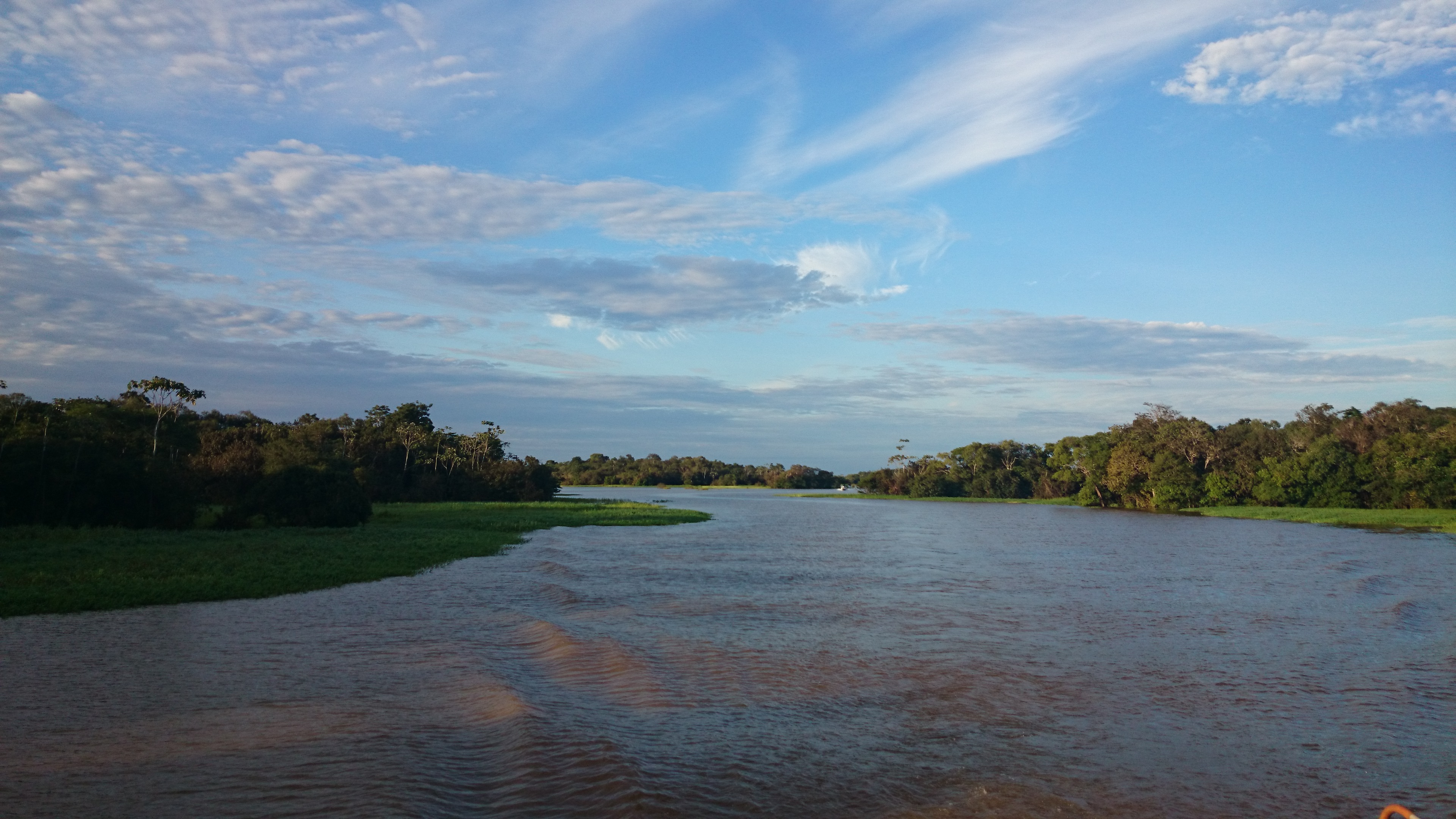
- Mouth of the river that gives of the Anamã city name, Anamã River.

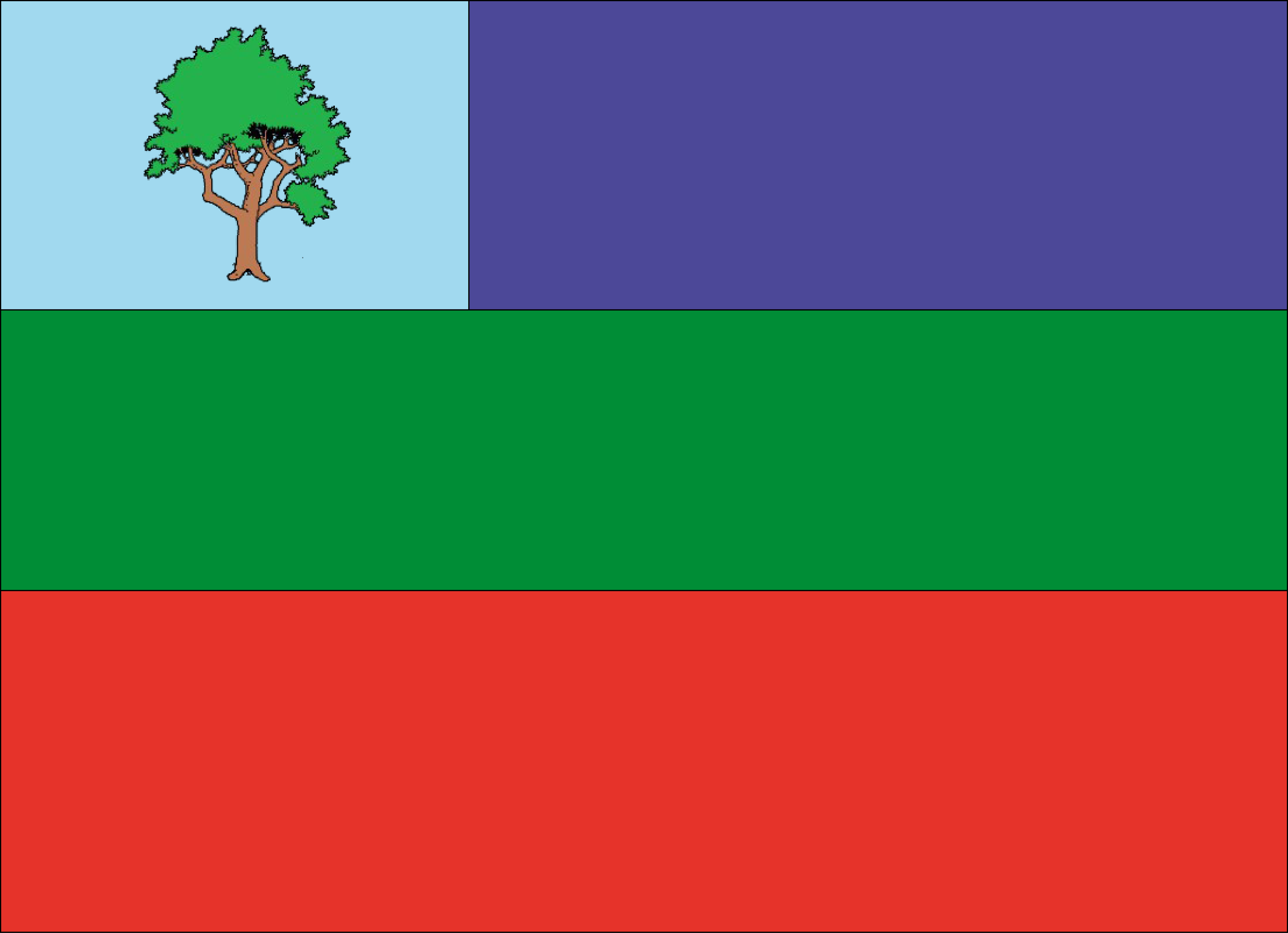
- Flag

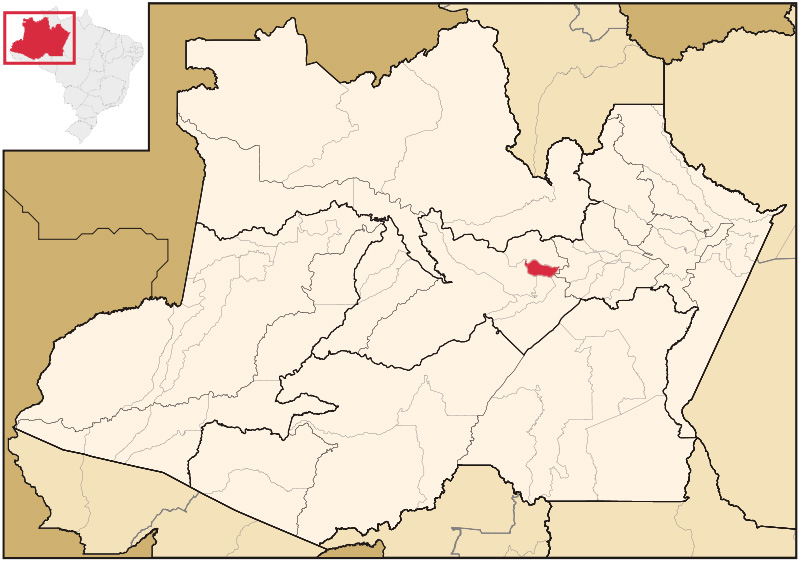
- Location of the municipality inside Amazonas

- Location in Brazil
- Coordinates: 3°34′48″S 61°24′14″W
- Country: Brazil
- Region: North
- State: Amazonas

Area
  - Total: 2,454 km^{2} (947 sq mi)

Population (2020)
  - Total: 13,956
  - Density: 5.687/km^{2} (14.73/sq mi)
- Time zone: UTC−4 (AMT)
- Climate: Af

Anamã is a municipality located in the Brazilian state of Amazonas. Its population was 13,956 (2020) and its area is 2,454 km^{2}.

== Etymology ==
O escritor e pesquisador Ivany Jamys Ferreira Régis em seu livro: "Conciso esboço historiográfico de Anamã", afirma que o nome Anamã é um vocábulo polissêmico oriundo da língua nheengatu e que encontra-se registrado em duas monumentais obras, a primeira, de autoria de Ermanno Stradelli intitulada, Vocabulário Nheengatu-Português e Português-Nheengatu, publicada em 1928 na Revista do Instituto Histórico e Geográfico Brasileiro, e atualmente reeditado pela Ateliê editorial nas páginas 319, 510 e 524 encontram-se os seguintes significados:

ANAMÃ, YANAMÃ – - espesso, denso, grosso (dos líquidos).

Possivelmente uma referência as bebidas refrescantes, fermentadas ou destiladas usadas em festas indígenas: caxiry, carimã, carimé, cauyn. cibé, paiauru, tykyra.

ANAMÃ – desmamado.

UANAMÃ, ANAMÃ - casta de marreca (Amazonetta brasiliensis)

A segunda obra, de autoria do catedrático Octaviano Mello, Dicionário Tupi-Português/Português-Tupi, na página 26:[6]

ANAMÃ - espesso, coalhado, lotado.

== History ==
Evidences of the first modern human habitations in Anamã and neighbouring regions, occurred in the period of the first latex extraction fields (fluid withdrawn from rubber trees, raw material of natural rubber), at the beginning of the commercial exploitation of rubber or rubber cycle, the region of the current city was a rubber farm, where was extracted and exported using the seaports of northern Brazil for international markets in Europe and the USA. After the fall in production mainly due to stiff competition from Asia, the region suffered a bitter experience of poverty becoming almost a satellite town of the State capital, Manaus, the rubber farms went bankrupt and workers became residents of these farms over the years, It was gaining city format and transformed into district, under administration of the neighbor Anori, in the year 1981 by constitutional amendment 112 number rises Anamã to the status of municipality.

== Geography ==
Limited to the north and west by the municipality of Anori; to the south with the municipality of Beruri; and to the east, with Manacapuru, municipality currently has 22 communities, whose main are: Arixi; Cabaça; New Brazil; Mato Rosso; Nossa Senhora de Nazaré and the indigenous communities of São José of Eware (tikunas), Bom Jesus, Nova Esperança and Santa Luzia (kokamas) on the fluvial island of the Chameleon. The climate is typically hot and humid equatorial, clearly visible in the dry and rainy seasons, in the high altitudes do not cause significant changes in the thermal averages. October is the month hot, with average temperatures of 33 °C (91.4 °F); June is usually the coldest month, has an average temperature of 24 °C (75.2 °F). The absolute maximum hardly exceeds 38 °C (100.4 °F), that in the warmer months (September, October and November). In the winter, the thermal sensation is mild, despite it is subject to the low temperatures with averages of 22 °C (71.6 °F) until 18 °C (64.4 °F). The months of November to March occurs 85% of the annual precipitation rainy.
