= List of municipalities in Amazonas =

Overview of municipalities in Amazonas

This is a list of the municipalities in the state of Amazonas (AM), located in the North Region of Brazil. Amazonas is divided into 62 municipalities.

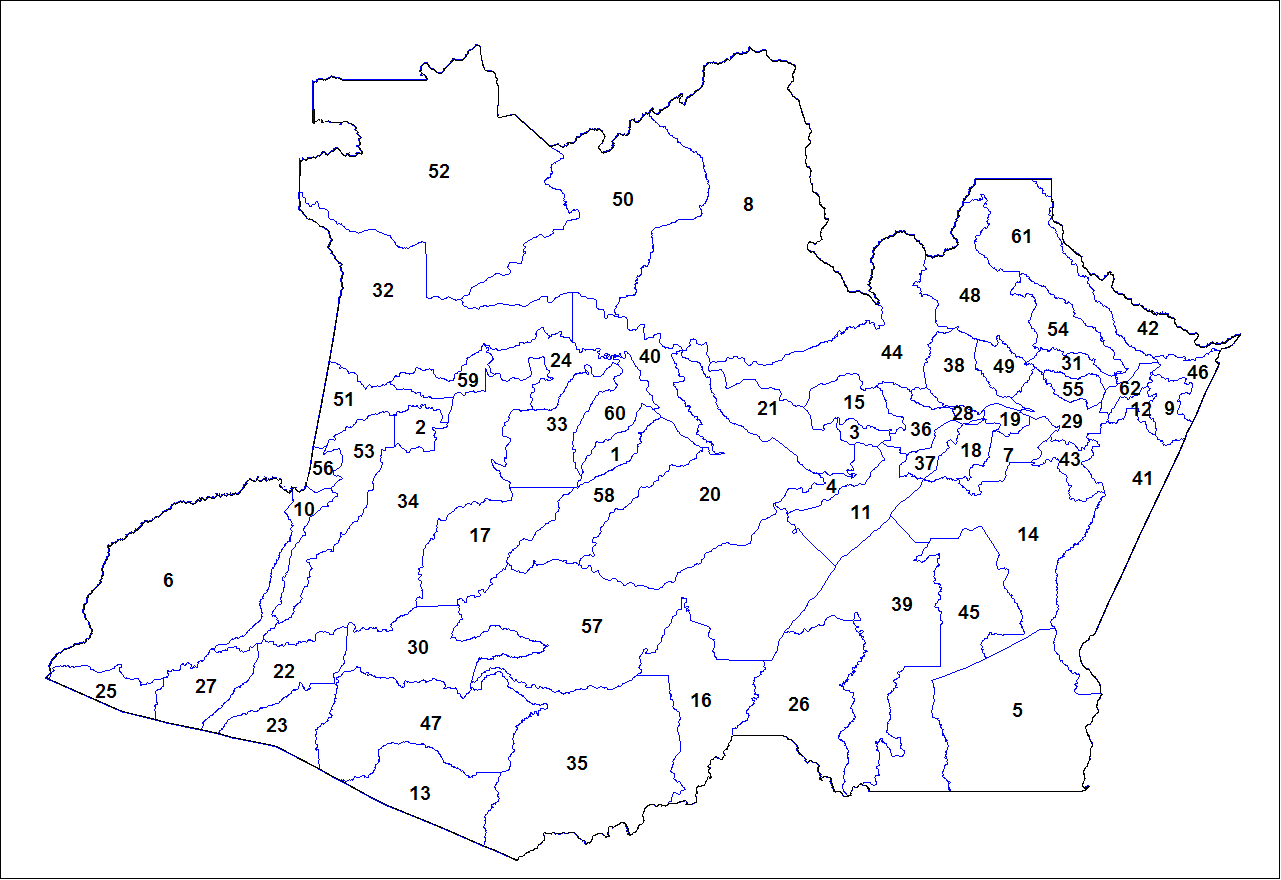
Municipalities of Amazonas, Brazil

== Municipalities ==
† State capital

Municipalities in Amazonas
| Name | Immediate region | Intermediate region | Population (2022 census) | Population (2010 census) | Population change | Land area (km^{2}) | Population density (2022) |
|---|---|---|---|---|---|---|---|
| Alvarães | Tefé | Tefé | 15,866 | 14,088 | +12.6% | 5,911.8 | 2.7/km^{2} |
| Amaturá | Tabatinga | Tefé | 10,819 | 9,467 | +14.3% | 4,758.7 | 2.3/km^{2} |
| Anamã | Manacapuru | Manaus | 9,962 | 10,214 | −2.5% | 2,453.9 | 4.1/km^{2} |
| Anori | Coari | Manaus | 17,194 | 16,317 | +5.4% | 5,795.3 | 3.0/km^{2} |
| Apuí | Manicoré | Lábrea | 20,647 | 18,007 | +14.7% | 54,239.9 | 0.4/km^{2} |
| Atalaia do Norte | Tabatinga | Tefé | 15,314 | 15,153 | +1.1% | 76,351.9 | 0.2/km^{2} |
| Autazes | Manaus | Manaus | 41,564 | 32,135 | +29.3% | 7,599.4 | 5.5/km^{2} |
| Barcelos | São Gabriel da Cachoeira | Manaus | 18,834 | 25,718 | −26.8% | 122,476.0 | 0.2/km^{2} |
| Barreirinha | Parintins | Parintins | 31,051 | 27,355 | +13.5% | 5,750.6 | 5.4/km^{2} |
| Benjamin Constant | Tabatinga | Tefé | 37,648 | 33,411 | +12.7% | 8,793.4 | 4.3/km^{2} |
| Beruri | Coari | Manaus | 20,718 | 15,486 | +33.8% | 17,250.7 | 1.2/km^{2} |
| Boa Vista do Ramos | Parintins | Parintins | 23,785 | 14,979 | +58.8% | 2,586.8 | 9.2/km^{2} |
| Boca do Acre | Lábrea | Lábrea | 35,447 | 30,632 | +15.7% | 21,952.8 | 1.6/km^{2} |
| Borba | Manaus | Manaus | 33,080 | 34,961 | −5.4% | 44,251.7 | 0.7/km^{2} |
| Caapiranga | Manacapuru | Manaus | 13,469 | 10,975 | +22.7% | 9,456.6 | 1.4/km^{2} |
| Canutama | Lábrea | Lábrea | 16,869 | 12,738 | +32.4% | 29,819.7 | 0.6/km^{2} |
| Carauari | Tefé | Tefé | 28,742 | 25,774 | +11.5% | 25,767.7 | 1.1/km^{2} |
| Careiro | Manaus | Manaus | 30,792 | 32,734 | −5.9% | 6,091.5 | 5.1/km^{2} |
| Careiro da Várzea | Manaus | Manaus | 19,637 | 23,930 | −17.9% | 2,631.1 | 7.5/km^{2} |
| Coari | Coari | Manaus | 70,616 | 75,965 | −7.0% | 57,921.9 | 1.2/km^{2} |
| Codajás | Coari | Manaus | 23,549 | 23,206 | +1.5% | 18,711.5 | 1.3/km^{2} |
| Eirunepé | Eirunepé | Tefé | 33,170 | 30,665 | +8.2% | 15,011.8 | 2.2/km^{2} |
| Envira | Eirunepé | Tefé | 17,186 | 16,338 | +5.2% | 7,499.4 | 2.3/km^{2} |
| Fonte Boa | Tefé | Tefé | 25,871 | 22,817 | +13.4% | 12,110.9 | 2.1/km^{2} |
| Guajará | Eirunepé | Tefé | 13,815 | 13,974 | −1.1% | 7,579.6 | 1.8/km^{2} |
| Humaitá | Manicoré | Lábrea | 57,473 | 44,227 | +30.0% | 33,071.8 | 1.7/km^{2} |
| Ipixuna | Eirunepé | Tefé | 24,311 | 22,254 | +9.2% | 12,044.8 | 2.0/km^{2} |
| Iranduba | Manaus | Manaus | 61,163 | 40,781 | +50.0% | 2,214.3 | 27.6/km^{2} |
| Itacoatiara | Parintins | Parintins | 103,598 | 86,839 | +19.3% | 8,892.0 | 11.7/km^{2} |
| Itamarati | Eirunepé | Tefé | 10,937 | 8,038 | +36.1% | 25,276.0 | 0.4/km^{2} |
| Itapiranga | Parintins | Parintins | 10,162 | 8,211 | +23.8% | 4,231.1 | 2.4/km^{2} |
| Japurá | Tefé | Tefé | 8,858 | 7,326 | +20.9% | 55,791.9 | 0.2/km^{2} |
| Juruá | Tefé | Tefé | 10,742 | 10,802 | −0.6% | 19,400.7 | 0.6/km^{2} |
| Jutaí | Tefé | Tefé | 25,172 | 17,992 | +39.9% | 69,551.9 | 0.4/km^{2} |
| Lábrea | Lábrea | Lábrea | 45,448 | 37,701 | +20.5% | 68,234.0 | 0.7/km^{2} |
| Manacapuru | Manacapuru | Manaus | 101,883 | 85,141 | +19.7% | 7,330.1 | 13.9/km^{2} |
| Manaquiri | Manaus | Manaus | 17,107 | 22,801 | −25.0% | 3,975.8 | 4.3/km^{2} |
| Manaus† | Manaus | Manaus | 2,063,689 | 1,802,014 | +14.5% | 11,401.1 | 181.0/km^{2} |
| Manicoré | Manicoré | Lábrea | 53,914 | 47,017 | +14.7% | 48,282.7 | 1.1/km^{2} |
| Maraã | Tefé | Tefé | 15,529 | 17,528 | −11.4% | 16,910.4 | 0.9/km^{2} |
| Maués | Parintins | Parintins | 61,204 | 52,236 | +17.2% | 39,989.9 | 1.5/km^{2} |
| Nhamundá | Parintins | Parintins | 20,136 | 18,278 | +10.2% | 14,105.6 | 1.4/km^{2} |
| Nova Olinda do Norte | Manaus | Manaus | 27,062 | 30,696 | −11.8% | 5,608.6 | 4.8/km^{2} |
| Novo Airão | Manacapuru | Manaus | 15,761 | 14,723 | +7.1% | 37,771.3 | 0.4/km^{2} |
| Novo Aripuanã | Manicoré | Lábrea | 23,818 | 21,451 | +11.0% | 41,188.5 | 0.6/km^{2} |
| Parintins | Parintins | Parintins | 96,372 | 102,033 | −5.5% | 5,952.4 | 16.2/km^{2} |
| Pauini | Lábrea | Lábrea | 19,373 | 18,166 | +6.6% | 41,610.3 | 0.5/km^{2} |
| Presidente Figueiredo | Manaus | Manaus | 30,668 | 27,175 | +12.9% | 25,422.3 | 1.2/km^{2} |
| Rio Preto da Eva | Manaus | Manaus | 24,936 | 25,719 | −3.0% | 5,813.2 | 4.3/km^{2} |
| Santa Isabel do Rio Negro | São Gabriel da Cachoeira | Manaus | 14,164 | 18,146 | −21.9% | 62,846.4 | 0.2/km^{2} |
| Santo Antônio do Içá | Tabatinga | Tefé | 28,211 | 24,481 | +15.2% | 12,307.2 | 2.3/km^{2} |
| São Gabriel da Cachoeira | São Gabriel da Cachoeira | Manaus | 51,795 | 37,896 | +36.7% | 109,183.5 | 0.5/km^{2} |
| São Paulo de Olivença | Tabatinga | Tefé | 32,967 | 31,422 | +4.9% | 19,745.9 | 1.7/km^{2} |
| São Sebastião do Uatumã | Parintins | Parintins | 11,670 | 10,705 | +9.0% | 10,741.1 | 1.1/km^{2} |
| Silves | Parintins | Parintins | 11,559 | 8,444 | +36.9% | 3,748.8 | 3.1/km^{2} |
| Tabatinga | Tabatinga | Tefé | 66,764 | 52,272 | +27.7% | 3,224.9 | 20.7/km^{2} |
| Tapauá | Lábrea | Lábrea | 19,599 | 19,077 | +2.7% | 89,325.3 | 0.2/km^{2} |
| Tefé | Tefé | Tefé | 73,669 | 61,453 | +19.9% | 23,704.5 | 3.1/km^{2} |
| Tonantins | Tabatinga | Tefé | 19,247 | 17,079 | +12.7% | 6,432.7 | 3.0/km^{2} |
| Uarini | Tefé | Tefé | 14,431 | 11,891 | +21.4% | 10,246.2 | 1.4/km^{2} |
| Urucará | Parintins | Parintins | 18,631 | 17,094 | +9.0% | 27,903.4 | 0.7/km^{2} |
| Urucurituba | Parintins | Parintins | 23,945 | 17,837 | +34.2% | 2,906.7 | 8.2/km^{2} |
| Amazonas | — | — | 3,941,613 | 3,483,985 | +13.14% | 1,559,161.7 | 2.2/km^{2} |
| North Region | — | — | 17,354,884 | 15,864,454 | +9.39% | 3,853,575.6 | 4.5/km^{2} |
| Brazil | — | — | 203,080,756 | 190,755,799 | +6.46% | 8,502,728.3 | 23.9/km^{2} |

== See also ==
- Geography of Brazil
- List of cities in Brazil by population
