= Greater Manaus =

Greater Manaus Metropolitan Region of Manaus
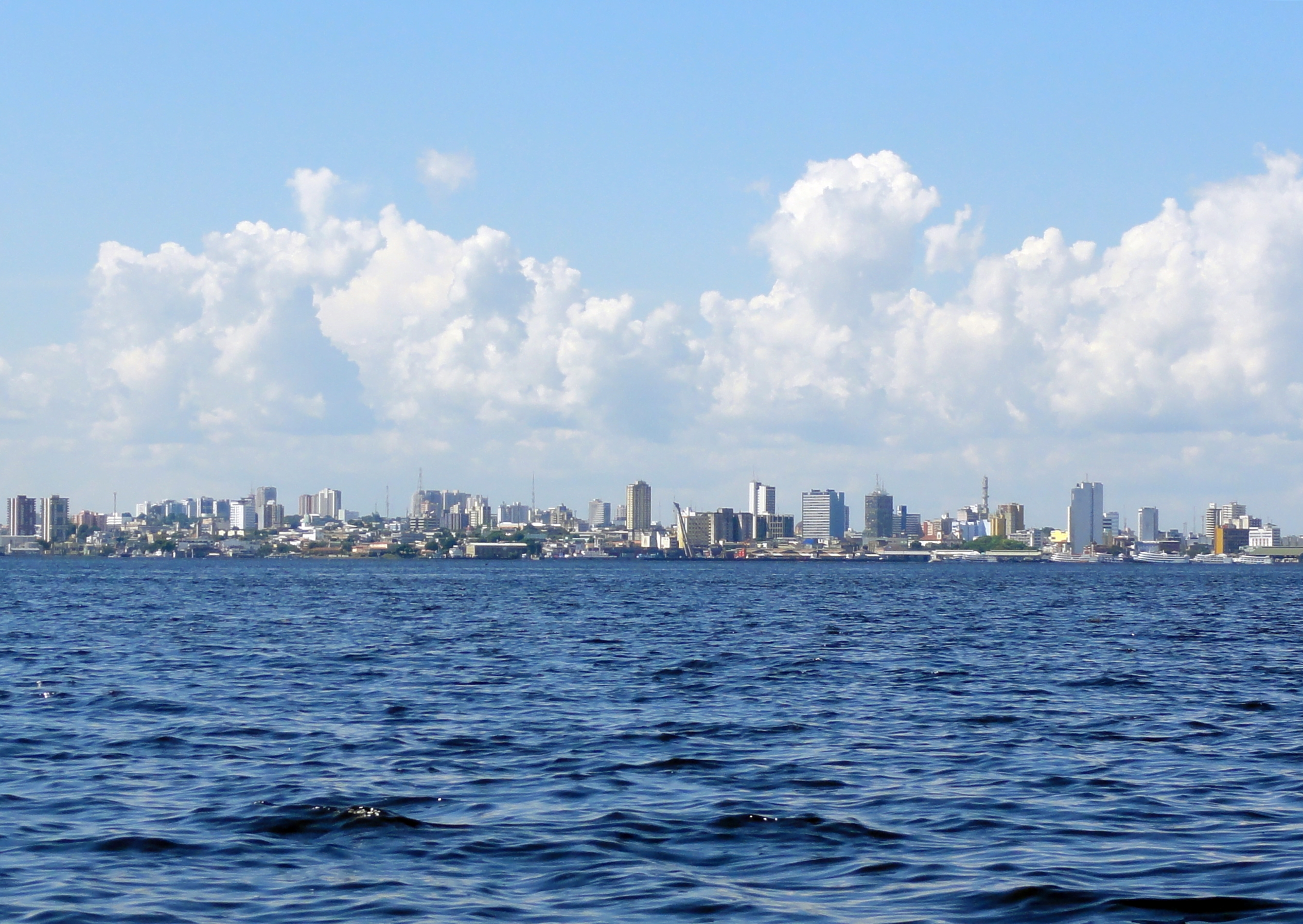
- Skyline of Manaus, view from Rio Negro

- Coordinates: 03°06′S 60°01′W
- Country: Brazil
- State: Amazonas
- Principal cities: Manaus; Itacoatiara; Manacapuru; Iranduba; Careiro Castanho; Careiro da Várzea; Autazes; Presidente Figueiredo; Rio Preto da Eva; Manaquiri; Novo Airão; Itapiranga; Silves

Area
  - Total: 49,146.089 sq mi (127,287.79 km^{2})

Population (2018)
  - Total: 2,631,239 (11th)
  - Density: 65.55/sq mi (25.31/km^{2})
- Time zone: UTC-4 (Eastern Time Zone)
- Area codes: 92
- Website: www.amazonas.am.gov.br

Greater Manaus (Grande Manaus, officially Região Metropolitana de Manaus, in Portuguese) is a large metropolitan area located in Amazonas state in Brazil. It consists of 13 municipalities, including the capital, Manaus.

== Economy ==
Its GDP is estimated at 61 billion dollars, the richest in northern Brazil.

=== Manaus Free Trade Zone ===
Greater Manaus is home to one of the most modern industrial centers of Latin America. This is a large concentration of high-tech industries in the areas of electronics, two-wheeled vehicles, optical products, computer products, chemical industry, etc.

The Manaus Free Trade Zone (MFTZ), which is regulated by Decree-Law No. 288/1967, was conceived as a free import and export trade area with special tax incentives. It was set up with the object of creating an industrial, commercial and agricultural center in the hinterland of the Amazon Region, which would be equipped with economic conditions that would enable the region to be occupied and developed.

Approximately five decades after its establishment, the Manaus Free Trade Zone serves as a regional economic development initiative in the Brazilian Amazon. It aims to support economic activity, promote the region's economic and social integration with the rest of Brazil, and reinforce Brazil's presence in the country's northern border regions.

During its historical evolution, the Manaus Free Trade Zone has enabled three economic hubs to be developed: industrial, commercial and agricultural. The first of these, represented by the Manaus Industrial Sector (PIM), is considered to be the foundation stone that sustains the model.

The Manaus Free Trade Zone model is administered by the Superintendence of the Manaus Free Trade Zone (SUFRAMA), an independent Federal Agency under the Brazilian Ministry of Development, Industry and Foreign Trade (MDIC).

== Demographics ==
The metropolitan area of Manaus is the 11th most populous in Brazil, with an estimated population of 2.7 million inhabitants.
