= Amazonas inland =

Region within Amazonas, Brazil

Amazonas in Brazil

The inlands of the Amazonas state is an informal term used to refer to the region that covers the entire state of Amazonas, except for the Metropolitan Region of Manaus.

Amazonas, Brazil's largest state in terms of territory, is located in the center of the world's largest rainforest with 98% of its area preserved, combining its ecological potential with a business policy based on sustainability.

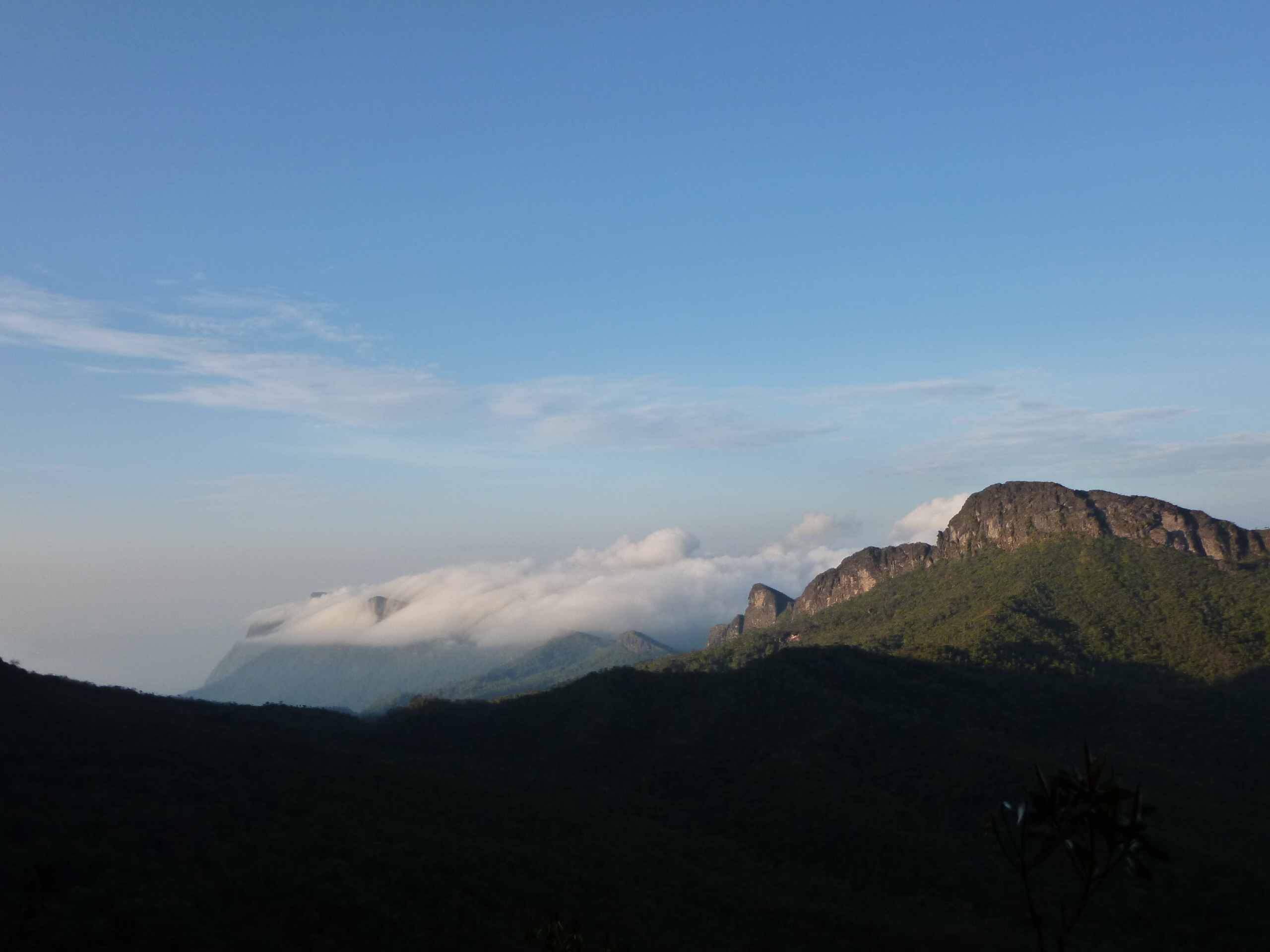
Santa Isabel do Rio Negro, the highest point of the national territory.

The state is a combination of modernity and nature conservation, with bold cultural spaces, shopping centers, a hotel chain, restaurants, a diversified education network, ecological parks and spaces for social integration, which ensure quality of life and well-being for the population. Pico da Neblina, the highest peak in Brazil, is located in the municipality of Santa Isabel do Rio Negro. The state also has a number of tourism options, ranging from visiting caves and waterfalls to tree climbing, sport fishing, folklore festivals and historical heritage sites.

== Economy ==
The main products of plant extraction in the state of Amazonas are: wood, rubber, Amazon nuts, cocoa, essences, copaiba oils, andiroba, piassava, coconut, açaí and bacuri. Mineral extraction is expanding and the most important ores are: bauxite, iron, rock salt, manganese, lignite, gold and cassiterite. The extraction of these minerals takes place mainly in the municipality of Novo Aripuanã, where diamonds, nickel, copper, limestone, gypsum, lead, kaolinite and tin are also extracted.

The extraction of oil and natural gas takes place in the Urucu field, which is the largest onshore extraction unit in Brazil today. Located in the municipality of Coari, the city with the second largest municipal GDP in Amazonas after Manaus, it crosses the state with a 412 miles long gas pipeline linking Urucu to the capital where processing and distribution takes place from REMAM (Isaac Sabbá Refinery).

== Infrastructure ==
=== Airports ===
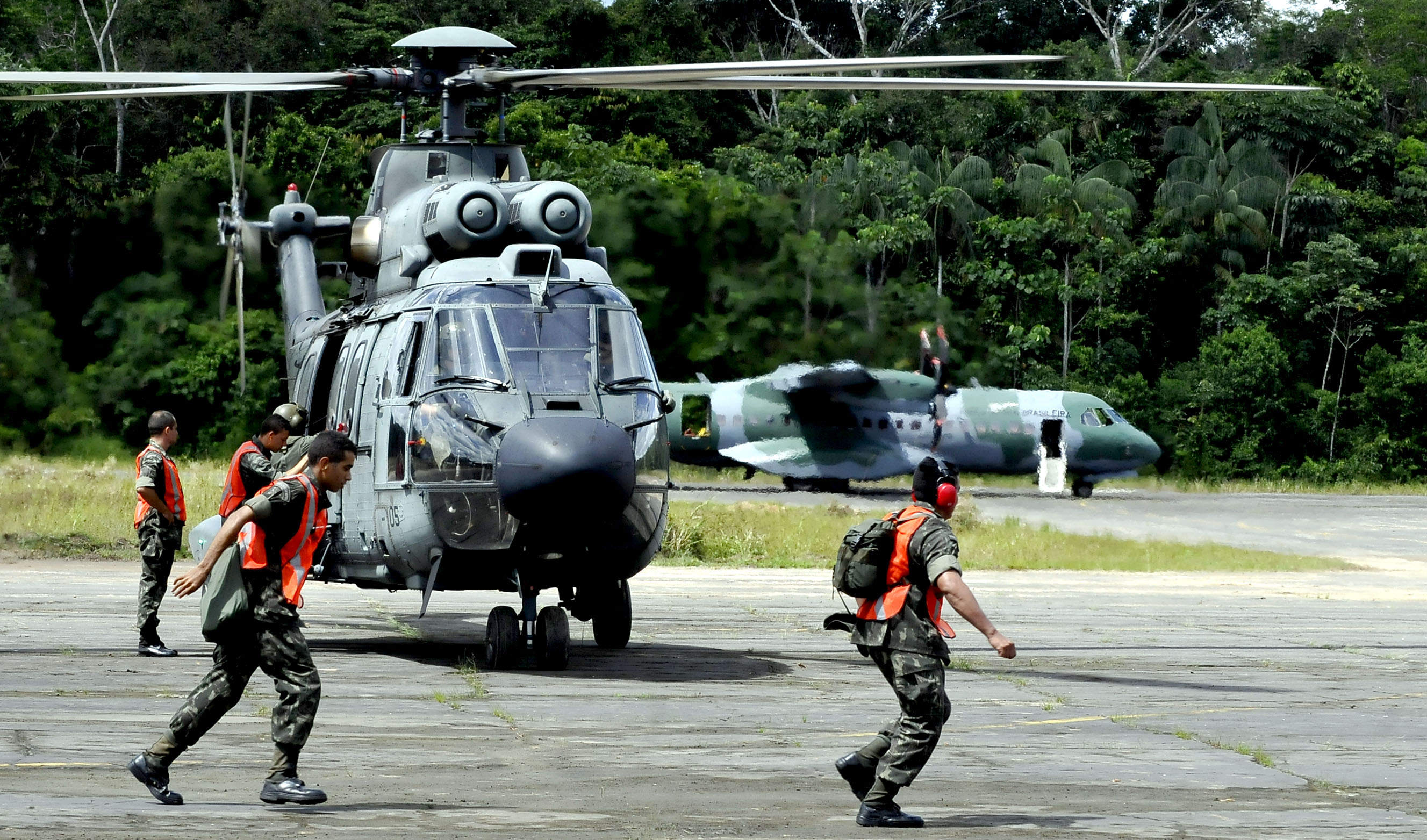
Operation Ágata 7 in the Tabatinga International Airport, 2013

In 2012, the federal government announced the construction of seven airports in Amazonas. The inlands has Tabatinga International Airport, the second busiest Infraero airport in the state. Other airports are of fundamental importance in integrating the state, such as Parintins Regional Airport, Tefé Regional Airport and Coari Regional Airport.

=== Waterways ===
The Amazon Waterway is the main route for transporting cargo, responsible for around 65% of the total transported in the region. The average annual movement of cargo since the beginning of the decade has been around 50 million tons per year.

Waterway transportation in the Amazon is diversified and serves a vast forest region, extremely dense and full of rivers. The waterway is fundamental for internal and external trade, because it allows products to be offered at competitive prices. Today, the region's waterway infrastructure consists of free-flowing waterways and stretches of canalized rivers.

=== Highways ===
The Amazonas highways are the BR-317, BR-319 and BR-230 (Transamazon Highway), in the south of the state. Apuí, Boca do Acre, Humaitá, Manicoré and Labrea use this type of transportation.

== Culture ==
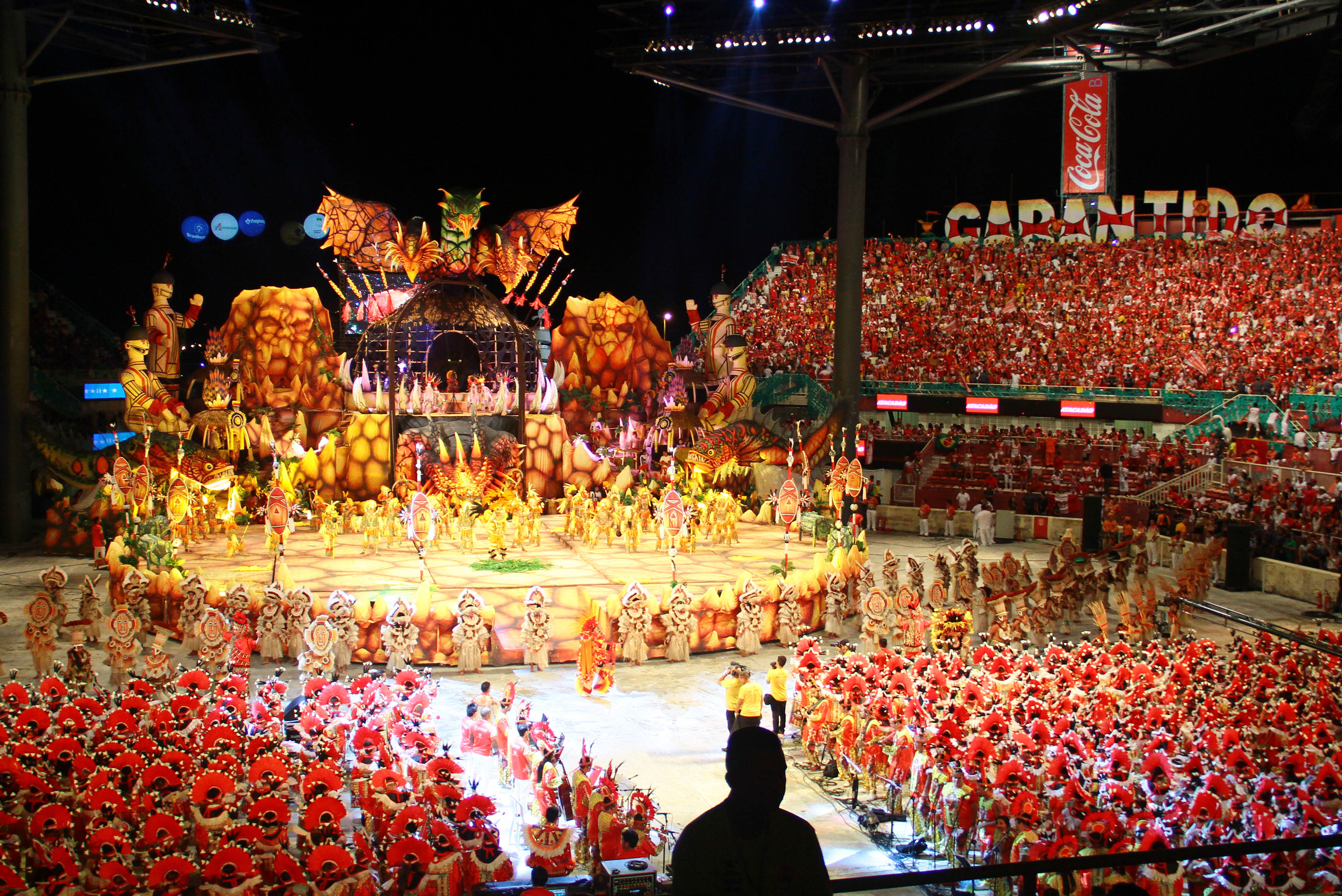
The Parintins Folk Festival, the largest popular festival in the inlands of Amazonas, recognized as a Cultural heritage of Brazil.

The main cultural event in the Amazonas state is the Parintins Folklore Festival.This is a popular festival held annually on the last weekend of June in the city of Parintins, Amazonas.

The Guaraná Festival in Maués is another important cultural attraction. To celebrate the harvest, which takes place once a year from October onwards, the producers come together at this event to show the various ways of consuming guaraná and the culture of the residents - most of whom are descendants of indigenous people. Among the various activities is a theatrical representation of the legend and myth of the fruit.

== See also ==
- Greater Manaus
- History of Amazonas
- Geography of Amazonas
