= Nova Olinda do Norte =

Municipality of Amazonas, Brazil

- Municipality
- Flag

- Amazonas state with Nova Olinda do Norte municipality in red

- Location in Brazil
- Coordinates: 3°53′16″S 59°05′38″W
- Country: Brazil
- Region: North
- State: Amazonas

Area
  - Total: 5,609 km^{2} (2,166 sq mi)

Population (2020)
  - Total: 38,026
  - Density: 5.4/km^{2} (14/sq mi)
- Time zone: UTC−4 (AMT)

Nova Olinda do Norte is a municipality located in the Brazilian state of Amazonas. Its population was 38,026 (2020) and its area is 5,609 km^{2}. The town is located on the banks of the lower Madeira River.

The municipality contains a small part of the 827,877-hectare (2,045,730-acre) Pau-Rosa National Forest, created in 2001.
