= Envira =

Municipality of Amazonas, Brazil

- Municipality
- Flag

- Location of the municipality inside Amazonas

- Location in Brazil
- Coordinates: 7°25′58″S 70°1′22″W
- Country: Brazil
- Region: North
- State: Amazonas

Population (2020)
  - Total: 20,393
- Time zone: UTC−5 (ACT)

Envira is a municipality in the Brazilian state of Amazonas. Its population was 20,393 as of 2020, and its area is 13,369 km^{2} (5,162 sq mi).
