= Itamarati =

Municipality of Amazonas, Brazil

- Municipality
- Location of the municipality inside Amazonas

- Location in Brazil
- Coordinates: 6°25′30″S 68°15′10″W
- Country: Brazil
- Region: North
- State: Amazonas

Population (2020)
  - Total: 7,814
- Time zone: UTC−4 (AMT)

Itamarati is a municipality located in the Brazilian state of Amazonas. Its population was 7,814 (2020) and its area is 25,276 km^{2}.
