= Alvarães, Amazonas =

Municipality of Amazonas, Brazil

Alvarães
- Municipality
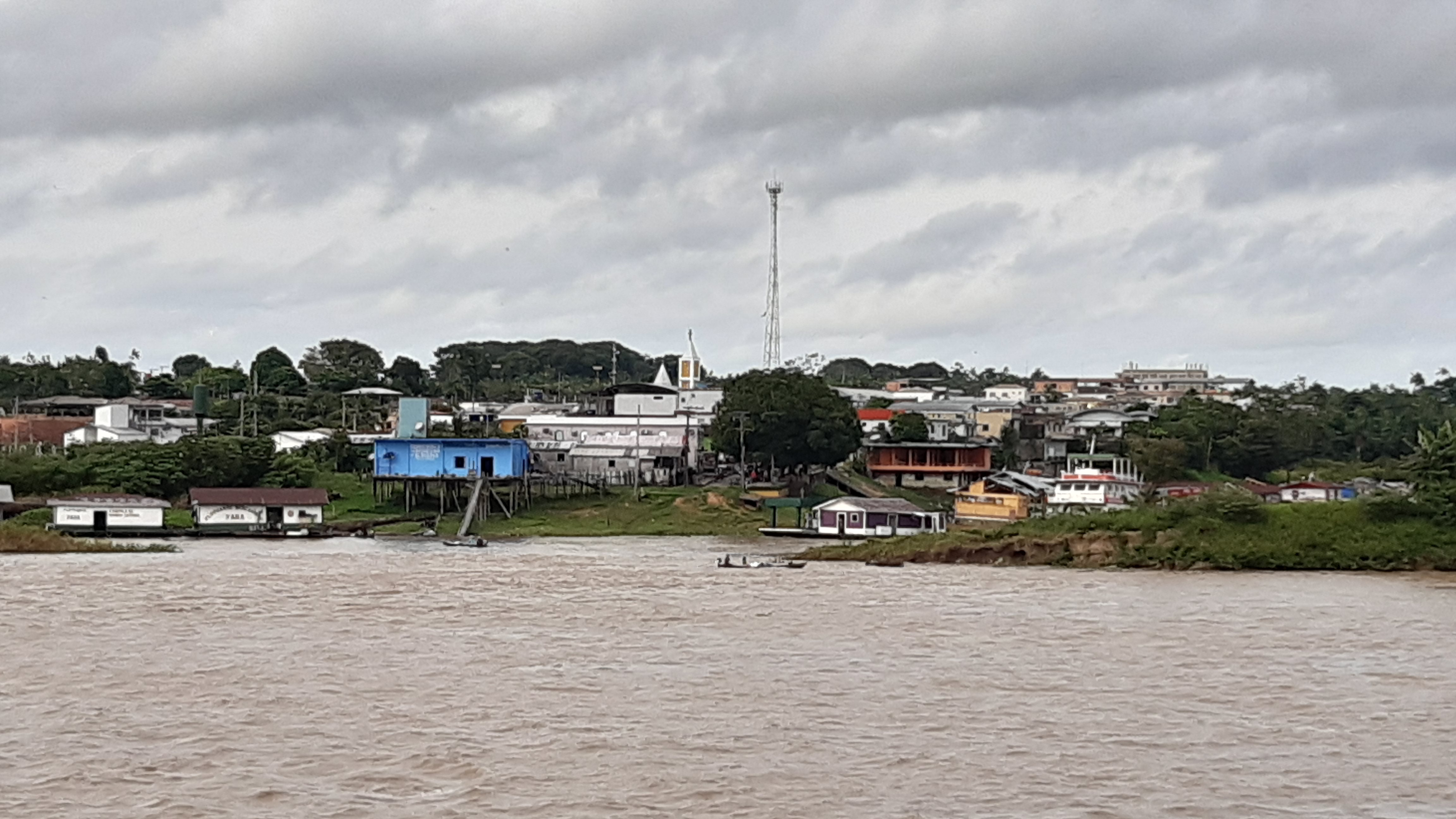
- View from the river

- Flag

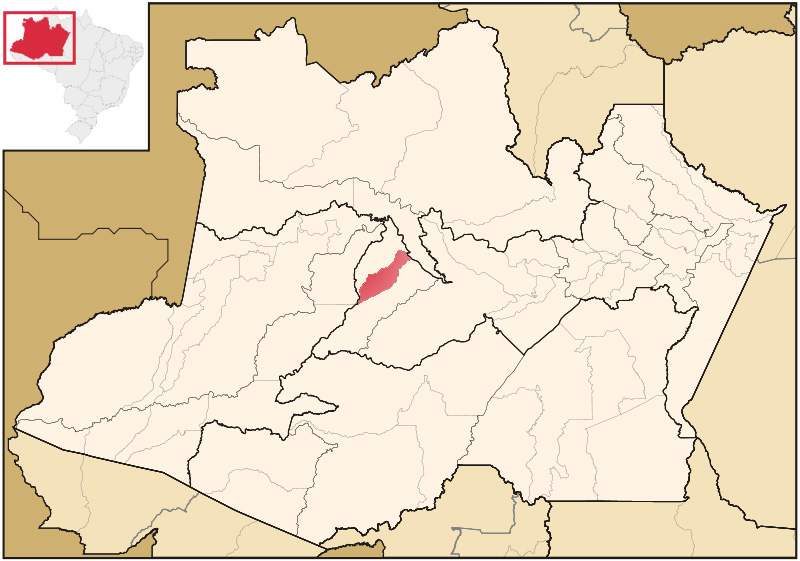
- Location of the municipality inside Amazonas

- Location in Brazil
- Coordinates: 3°13′15″S 64°48′15″W
- Country: Brazil
- Region: North
- State: Amazonas

Government
  - Mayor: Mário Tomás Litaiff (MDB )

Area
  - Total: 5,911.754 km^{2} (2,282.541 sq mi)

Population (2020)
  - Total: 16,220
  - Density: 2.38/km^{2} (6.2/sq mi)
- Time zone: UTC−4 (AMT)
- Climate: Af

Alvarães is a municipality located in the Brazilian state of Amazonas. Its population was 16,220 (2020) and its area is 5,912 km^{2}.

The municipality contains about 37% of the Tefé National Forest, created in 1989.
