= Urucurituba =

Municipality of Amazonas, Brazil

- Municipality
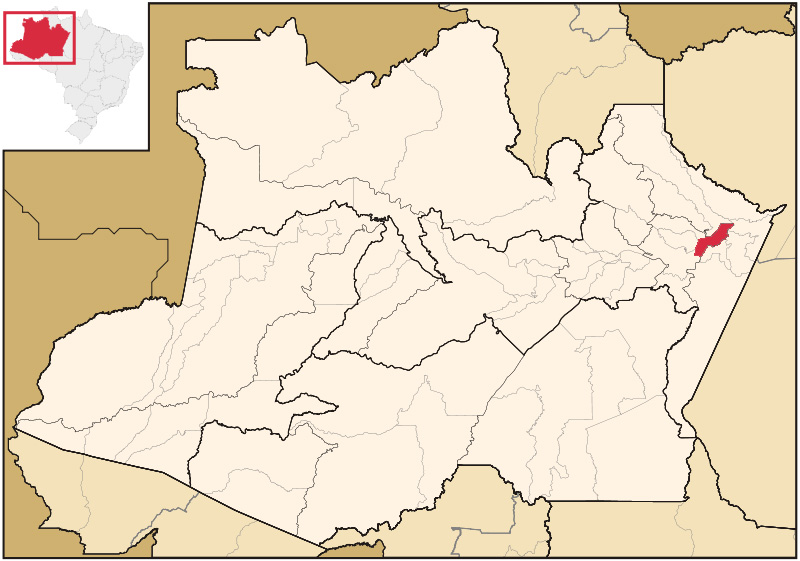
- Location of the municipality inside Amazonas

- Location in Brazil
- Coordinates: 3°7′51″S 58°9′18″W
- Country: Brazil
- Region: North
- State: Amazonas

Area
  - Total: 2,907 km^{2} (1,122 sq mi)

Population (2020)
  - Total: 23,585
  - Density: 3.1/km^{2} (8.0/sq mi)
- Time zone: UTC−4 (AMT)

Urucurituba is a municipality located in the Brazilian state of Amazonas. Its population was 23,585 (2020) and its area is 2,907 km^{2}.
