= Nhamundá =

Municipality of Amazonas, Brazil

- Municipality
- The Municipality of Nhamundá
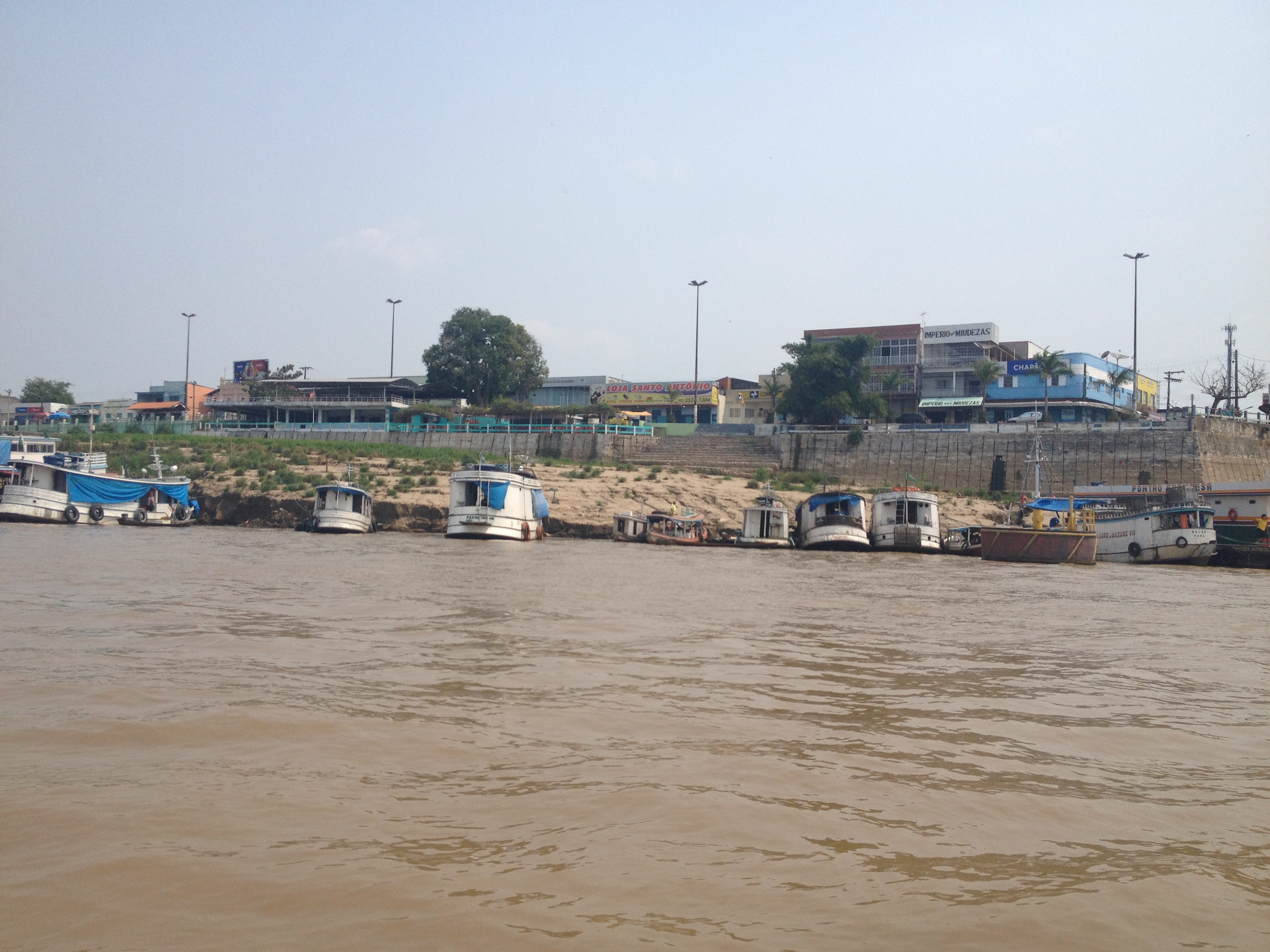

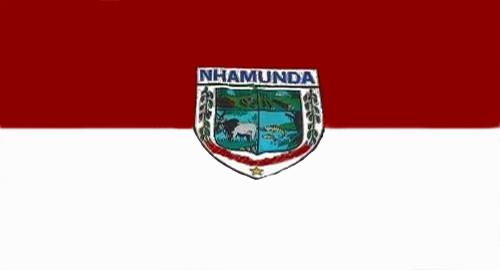
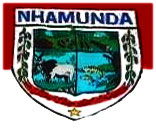
- Flag Coat of arms

- Location in Brazil
- Coordinates: 2°11′09″S 56°42′46″W
- Country: Brazil
- Region: North
- State: Amazonas
- Founded: January 31, 1956

Government
  - Mayor: Tomaz de Souza Pontes (PSDB)

Area
  - Total: 14.106 km^{2} (5.446 sq mi)
- Elevation: 50 m (160 ft)

Population (2020)
  - Total: 21,443
  - Density: 1.3/km^{2} (3.4/sq mi)
- Time zone: UTC−4 (AMT)
- HDI (2000): 0.656 – medium

Nhamundá is the easternmost municipality in the Brazilian state of Amazonas. Its population was 21,443 (2020) and its area is 14,106 km^{2}.
