= Amaturá =

Municipality of Amazonas, Brazil

- Municipality
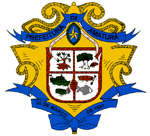
- Flag Coat of arms

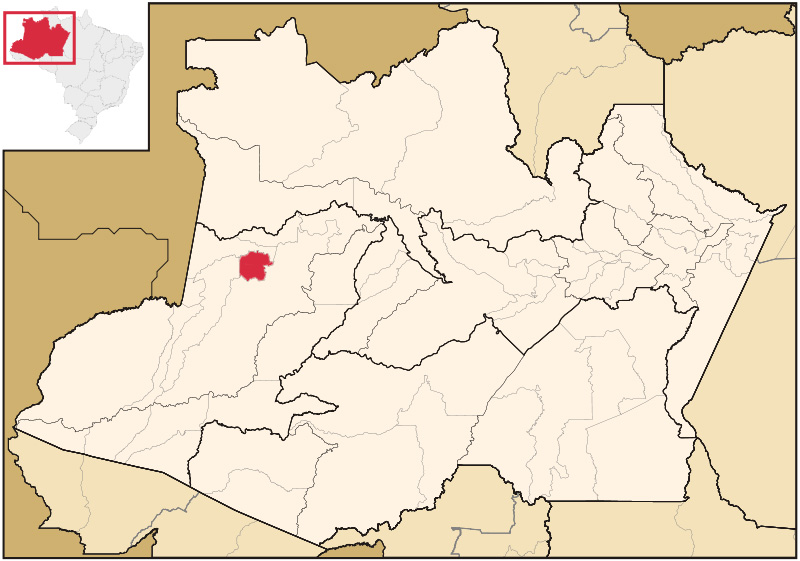
- Location of the municipality inside Amazonas

- Location in Brazil
- Coordinates: 3°21′50″S 68°11′52″W
- Country: Brazil
- Region: North
- State: Amazonas

Population (2020)
  - Total: 11,736
- Time zone: UTC−4 (AMT)
- Climate: Af

Amaturá is a municipality located in the Brazilian state of Amazonas. Its population was 11,736 (2020), up from 8,694 in 2008, but its area has remained constant at 4,759 km^{2}.

The municipality contains parts of the Jutaí-Solimões Ecological Station.
