= Careiro =

Municipality of Amazonas, Brazil

- Municipality
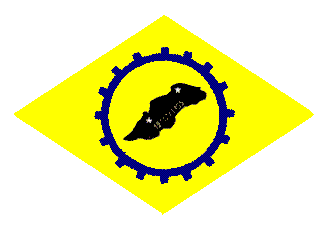
- Flag

- Location of the municipality inside Amazonas

- Location in Brazil
- Coordinates: 3°46′4″S 60°22′8″W
- Country: Brazil
- Region: North
- State: Amazonas

Area
  - Total: 6,092 km^{2} (2,352 sq mi)

Population (2020)
  - Total: 38,348
  - Density: 6.295/km^{2} (16.30/sq mi)
- Time zone: UTC−4 (AMT)

Careiro is a municipality located in the Brazilian state of Amazonas. Its population was 38,348 (2020) and its area is 6,092 km^{2}.
