= Anori =

Municipality of Amazonas, Brazil

- Municipality
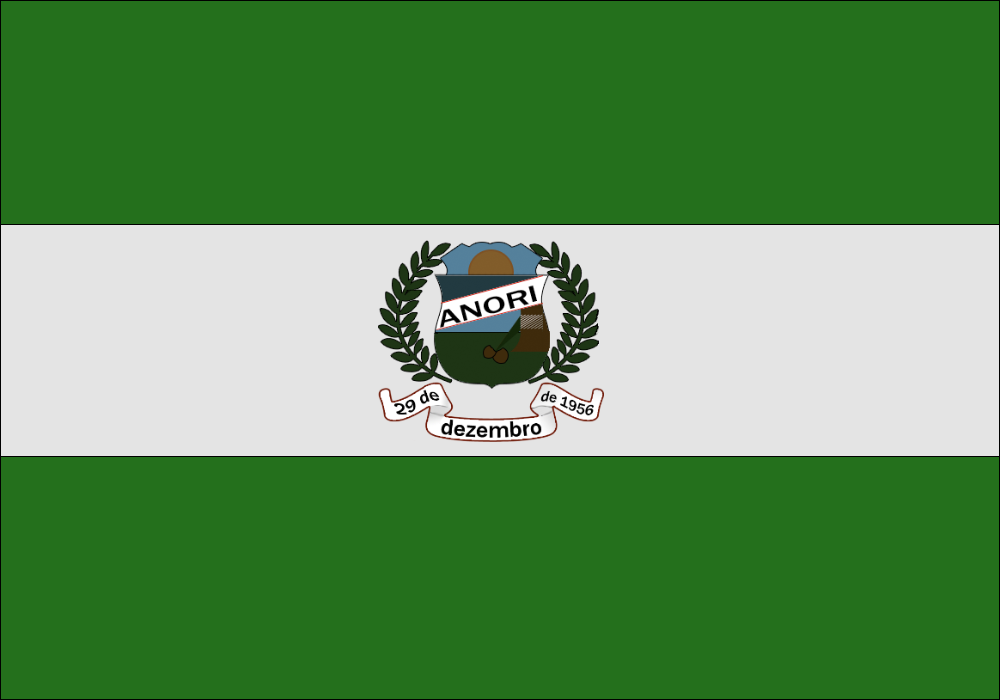
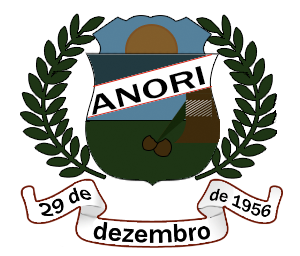
- Flag Coat of arms

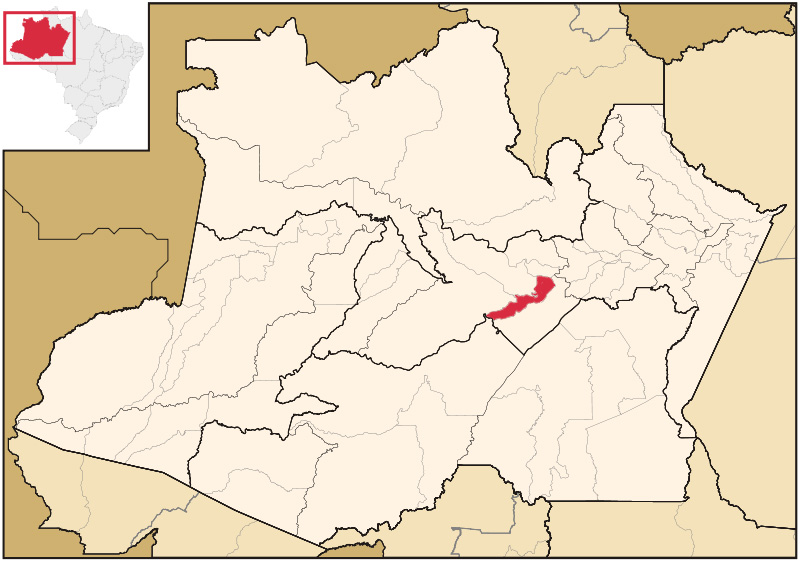
- Location of the municipality inside Amazonas
- Coordinates: 3°46′22″S 61°38′39″W
- Country: Brazil
- Region: North
- State: Amazonas

Area
  - Total: 5,795 km^{2} (2,237 sq mi)

Population (2020)
  - Total: 21,477
  - Density: 2.2/km^{2} (5.7/sq mi)
- Time zone: UTC−4 (AMT)
- Climate: Af

Anori is a municipality located in the Brazilian state of Amazonas. Its population was 21,477 (2020) and its area is 5,795 km^{2}.

The municipality contains 40.11% of the 1,008,167-hectare (2,491,230-acre) Piagaçu-Purus Sustainable Development Reserve, established in 2003.
