= Caapiranga =

Municipality of Amazonas, Brazil

- Municipality
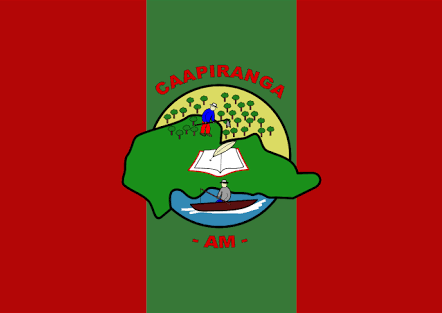
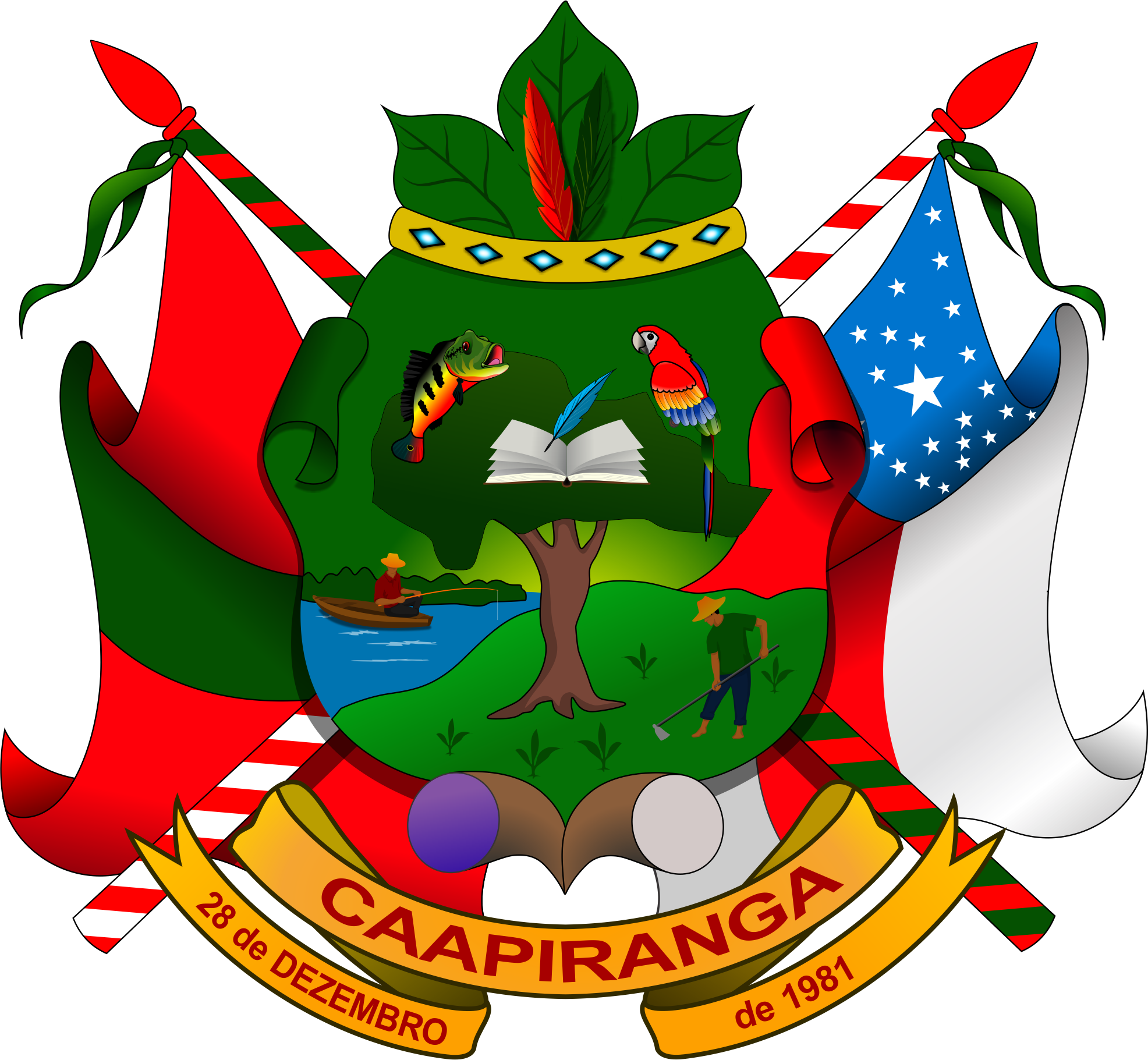
- Flag Coat of arms

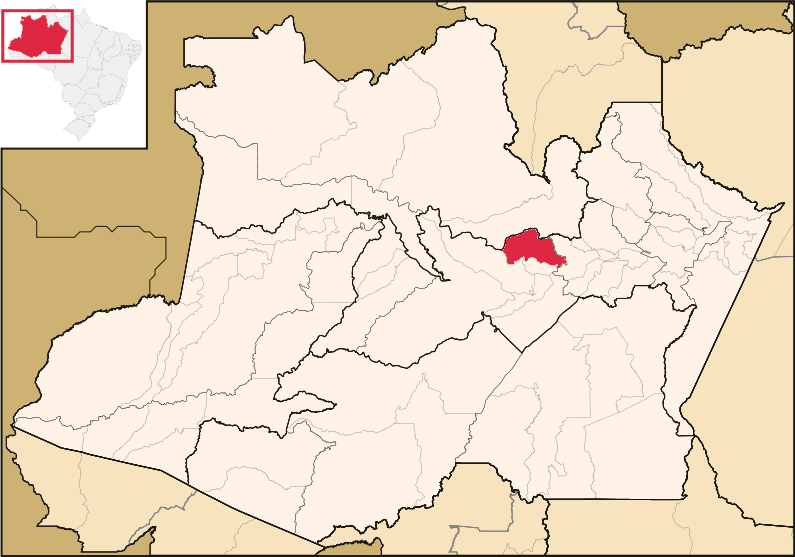
- Location of the municipality inside Amazonas

- Location in Brazil
- Coordinates: 3°19′39″S 61°12′32″W
- Country: Brazil
- Region: North
- State: Amazonas

Area
  - Total: 9,457 km^{2} (3,651 sq mi)

Population (2020)
  - Total: 13,283
  - Density: 1.1/km^{2} (2.8/sq mi)
- Time zone: UTC−4 (AMT)
- Climate: Af

Caapiranga is a municipality located in the Brazilian state of Amazonas. Its population was 13,283 (2020) and its area is 9,457 km^{2}.
