= Beruri =

Municipality of Amazonas, Brazil

- Municipality
- Location of the municipality inside Amazonas

- Location in Brazil
- Coordinates: 3°53′54″S 61°22′23″W
- Country: Brazil
- Region: North
- State: Amazonas

Area
  - Total: 17,251 km^{2} (6,661 sq mi)

Population (2020)
  - Total: 20,093
  - Density: 0.76/km^{2} (2.0/sq mi)
- Time zone: UTC−4 (AMT)
- Climate: Af

Beruri is a municipality located in the Brazilian state of Amazonas. Its population was 20,093 (2020) and its area is 17,251 km^{2}.

The municipality contains 28.17% of the 1,008,167-hectare (2,491,230-acre) Piagaçu-Purus Sustainable Development Reserve, established in 2003. It contains about 6% of the Nascentes do Lago Jari National Park, an 812,745-hectare (2,008,340-acre) protected area established in 2008. It contain 57% of the 397,557-hectare (982,380-acre) Igapó-Açu Sustainable Development Reserve, created in 2009.
