= Manaquiri =

Municipality of Amazonas, Brazil

- Municipality
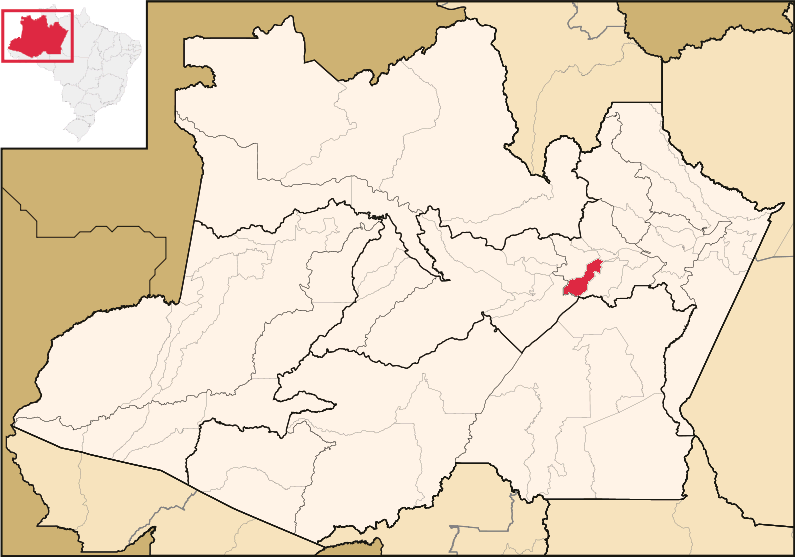
- Location of the municipality inside Amazonas

- Location in Brazil
- Coordinates: 3°25′41″S 60°27′34″W
- Country: Brazil
- Region: North
- State: Amazonas

Population (2020)
  - Total: 33,049
- Time zone: UTC−4 (AMT)

Manaquiri is a municipality located in the Brazilian state of Amazonas.

== Demography ==
Its population was 33,049 (2020) and its area is 3,976 km^{2}.

== Geography ==
Manaquiri is located in a portion of the southern Várzea forest of the Amazon River. The main waterway of the Amazon is located around 8 km (5 mi) north of the municipality.

== Transport ==
By road, Manaquiri is connected via the AM-354 highway.
