= Vicente Ferrer =

Vicente Ferrer may refer to:

- Vincent Ferrer (1350-1419), Dominican saint
- Vicente Ferrer Moncho (1920-2009), Spanish former Jesuit missionary
- Vicente Ferrer Roselló (born 1959), deputy and former senator in the Spanish parliament
- places named after Saint Vincent Ferrer, including:
  - Misión San Vicente Ferrer
  - São Vicente Ferrer, Maranhão, municipality in Marnhão state, Brazil
  - São Vicente Ferrer, Pernambuco, municipality in Pernambuco state, Brazil
