= Gulun Kung Fu =

Traditional internal Shaolin martial art

- 古轮拳法
- Also known as: Gulun Quanfa, Gulun Chui, Shaolin Wugulun, Gulun Kung-Fu, Shaolin Chui, True Shaolin Boxing, Ancient Wheel Boxing.
- Focus: Internal Shaolin kung fu
- Country of origin: China
- Creator: Wu Gulun (吴古轮, 1831–1914)
- Famous practitioners: Wu Shanlin, Wu Nanfang, (Shi) Dejian
- Parenthood: Shaolin kung fu; Yonghua Hall (永化堂) sub-lineage

Gulun Kung Fu (Chinese: 古轮拳法; pinyin: Gǔlún quánfǎ) is a traditional internal style of Shaolin kung fu maintained within the Wu family of Henan province, China. It is characterised by slow, spiralling movements practised in coordination with breath and standing meditation, and is integrated with Chan practice; the syllabus culminates in the form Xinyiba (心意把, "Heart-Mind-Grasp").

The lineage traces to Wu Gulun (吴古轮, 1831–1914), a former monk of Shaolin Temple who returned to lay life in 1869 and continued the practice in Yangshu Miao village near Mount Song. The current holder is Wu Nanfang (吴南方, born 1962), described in Chinese press and a 2018 CCTV documentary as the fifth-generation lineage holder. In August 2020, Gulun Kung Fu was recognised as municipal-level intangible cultural heritage in Luoyang, having previously been listed at Yanshi City level in 2015.

== History ==
=== Yonghua Hall ===
The lineage's monastic transmission is recorded as descending from the Yonghua Hall (永化堂), a sub-lineage of Shaolin Temple founded by the abbot Wuyan Zhengdao (无言正道, 1547–1623). Wuyan was the 26th-generation abbot of Shaolin, appointed under imperial decree during the Wanli reign in 1592. The hall took its name from a five-character poetic naming sequence — 圆通行超明 — used for the dharma names of its first five generations of disciples. Lineage records held by the Wu family list a 14-generation monastic transmission running from Wuyan Zhengdao to Wu Gulun's master Zhanmo (湛谟); the intermediate generations between Wuyan and the late-Qing holders Hai Fa (海发) and Zhanmo are known principally from the lineage's own internal records.

=== Wu Gulun and the 1869 departure ===
Wu Gulun, dharma name Jiqin (寂勤), was born in 1831 in Yanshi county, Henan. He is referenced in Volume 26 of the Yanshi County Gazetteer (under the variant character form 吴轱辘) as a Shaolin warrior monk of the Daoguang reign. The lineage records that he trained at Shi Gou Temple (石沟寺), a subsidiary monastery, under Zhanmo, the 14th-generation Yonghua Hall holder. In 1869 (Tongzhi 8), Wu Gulun left Shaolin and returned to lay life; the Wu family transmission describes this as the completion of a "Mountain Gate Test" (打出山门). He settled in Yangshu Miao village (杨树庙村) in the Boyu Gou (柏峪沟) valley behind Mount Song, where he practised medicine and farming alongside transmitting the lineage to his son Wu Shanlin. He died in 1914.

=== Twentieth century ===
After the 1928 burning of Shaolin Temple by warlord Shi Yousan, which destroyed many of the temple's halls and martial arts manuals, surviving Shaolin abbots invited Wu Gulun's son Wu Shanlin (1875–1970), then a layman, back to the temple to teach the surviving monks. According to a 2007 Phoenix News report on the Shaolin Chan-Wu-Yi Symposium at Dengfeng, Wu Shanlin trained more than forty warrior monks at the temple during this period, among them Shi Degen (释德根). The same lineage descended through Wu Shanlin's disciple Zhang Qinghe (张庆贺, monastic name Xingxing) to the Mount Song hermit-monk Shi Dejian (释德建), the subject of a 2010 CCTV-10 documentary series.

According to a 2025 Zhengzhou Daily feature on the Wu family transmission, the lineage continued in private practice at Yangshu Miao throughout the Cultural Revolution (1966–1976), and resumed public teaching from 1988 onwards under Wu Musheng (吴木升, 1930–2013) and his nephew Wu Nanfang.

== Practice ==
Gulun Kung Fu is described in Chinese press and broadcaster coverage as an internal style (内家拳, neijiaquan) characterised by slow, spiralling movements developed in coordination with breath and standing meditation, and integrated with Chan Buddhist practice. Foundation training begins with standing meditation (zhan zhuang, 站桩) and the Eight Pieces of Brocade (Ba Duan Jin, 八段锦). The basic form Pan Gen (盘根, "Twisting Root") is the first of the lineage's hand-form sequences and is taught publicly. The most advanced form in the syllabus is Xinyiba (心意把, "Heart-Mind-Grasp"), described in the Wu family materials by its longer doctrinal name Wushang Chan Gong Xinyiba (无上禅功心意把, "Supreme Chan-Skill Heart-Mind-Grasp"); the lineage frames it as the synthesis of the system, in which martial movement and meditation are practised as a single discipline. Shi Heng Yi, deputy abbot of Shaolin Temple Europe, has publicly described Gulun Kung Fu as containing the Shaolin form known as Xinyiba.

== Lineage holders ==
The Wu family lay-line generations as recorded by Zhengzhou Daily (2025) and the 2018 CCTV documentary are:

Lay-line generations of Gulun Kung Fu
Generation	Name	Dates
1	Wu Gulun (吴古轮; dharma name 寂勤)	1831–1914
2	Wu Shanlin (吴山林)	1875–1970
3	Wu Tianyou (吴天有); Wu Youde (吴有德)	1898–1950; 1908–1980
4	Wu Musheng (吴木升)	1930–2013
5	Wu Nanfang (吴南方)	born 1962

== Shifu Wu Nanfang ==
Shifu Wu Nanfang (吴南方; born 24 December 1962) is the current lineage holder of Gulun Kung Fu. He began training under his grand-uncle Wu Youde and later under his uncle Wu Musheng. In 1995, he took Buddhist refuge at Shaolin Temple under abbot Shi Suxi (释素喜), receiving the dharma name Shi Defang (释德方). According to the same source, he has trained more than one thousand international students from countries including the United States, the United Kingdom, Germany, Russia, South Korea and Japan since 1988, and has founded a training base, Gulun Chan Yuan (古轮禅院), on Mount Song. He was the central subject of an episode of the 2018 CCTV documentary series Heritage Season 2 (传承 第二季) and of two films by the British filmmaker Pankaja Brooke.

== Recognition ==
=== Intangible cultural heritage ===
Gulun Kung Fu was inscribed on the Yanshi City list of intangible cultural heritage in the fourth municipal batch in 2015, and on the Luoyang City list of intangible cultural heritage in the fifth municipal batch in August 2020. The broader Shaolin kung fu tradition of which it is part is included on the national list of intangible cultural heritage of the People's Republic of China.

=== Documentary and press coverage ===
The lineage was the subject of an episode of CCTV's documentary series Heritage Season 2 (传承 第二季) in May 2018, and of a follow-up CCTV documentary clip in January 2019. In April 2025, Zhengzhou Daily published a feature article on the Wu family transmission based on an interview with Wu Nanfang at his Mount Song training base. Phoenix News reported on the 2007 Shaolin Chan-Wu-Yi Symposium at Dengfeng, which addressed Wu Gulun's transmission and the descent of the lineage through Wu Shanlin. The UNESCO-related volume Humankind Oral and Intangible Cultural Heritage Series — Shaolin Kung Fu lists Jiqin (Wu Gulun's dharma name) and Wu Shanlin among modern inheritors of Shaolin martial arts. The Wu family lineage was featured in the 2008 BBC Two series Extreme Pilgrim episode "China: The Mountain", presented by Peter Owen Jones and filmed on Mount Song; Wu Nanfang appears in the programme.

The British filmmaker Pankaja Brooke directed two films on the lineage: the 56-minute feature Master Wu Nanfang and Shaolin Wugulun Kung Fu (2011), screened at the Marbella Film Festival and the Lucerne International Film Festival, and the short film Master Wu Nanfang on Song Mountain (2012).

=== Sister-lineage coverage ===
The wider Yonghua Hall lineage of which Gulun Kung Fu is part is also represented by Shi Dejian, who learned from Wu Gulun's grand-disciple Zhang Qinghe (also known as Xingxing) — a dharma brother of Wu Nanfang's teacher Wu Musheng. CCTV-10 broadcast a three-part documentary, Telling: Shaolin Chan-Wu-Yi Inheritor Shi Dejian (2010, repeated 2011 and 2012), on Shi Dejian's monastic complex on Mount Song. China News Service published a 2014 profile of Shi Dejian that referenced the same Yonghua Hall lineage. These programmes do not use the term "Gulun", but they cover the same Wugulun monastic descent.

=== Contemporary teaching networks ===
Shi Heng Yi, deputy abbot of Shaolin Temple Europe, publicly credits Wu Nanfang and Chen Geng of the Shaolin Wugulun Kung Fu Academy with teaching him the foundational form Pan Gen, in a video published on the official Shaolin Temple Europe channel in 2016. In a 2022 video, Shi Heng Yi described Wu Nanfang as one of the inheritors of Gulun Kung Fu and said that he had trained at the Gulun Academy on Mount Song. Shaolin Temple Europe maintains a programme page on Gulun Kung Fu naming Chen Geng as instructor, and lists Gulun Kung Fu retreats with Wu Nanfang in its 2026 calendar of events.

== See also ==
- Shaolin kung fu
- Internal martial arts
- Chan Buddhism
- Mount Song
- Shaolin Monastery
