= São Vicente Ferrer =

São Vicente Ferrer may refer to:

- The Portuguese name of Saint Vincent Ferrer
- São Vicente Ferrer, Maranhão, a parish in Brazil
- São Vicente Ferrer, Pernambuco, a parish in Brazil
