= Sebastião Mota de Melo =

Historical Brazilian religious leader

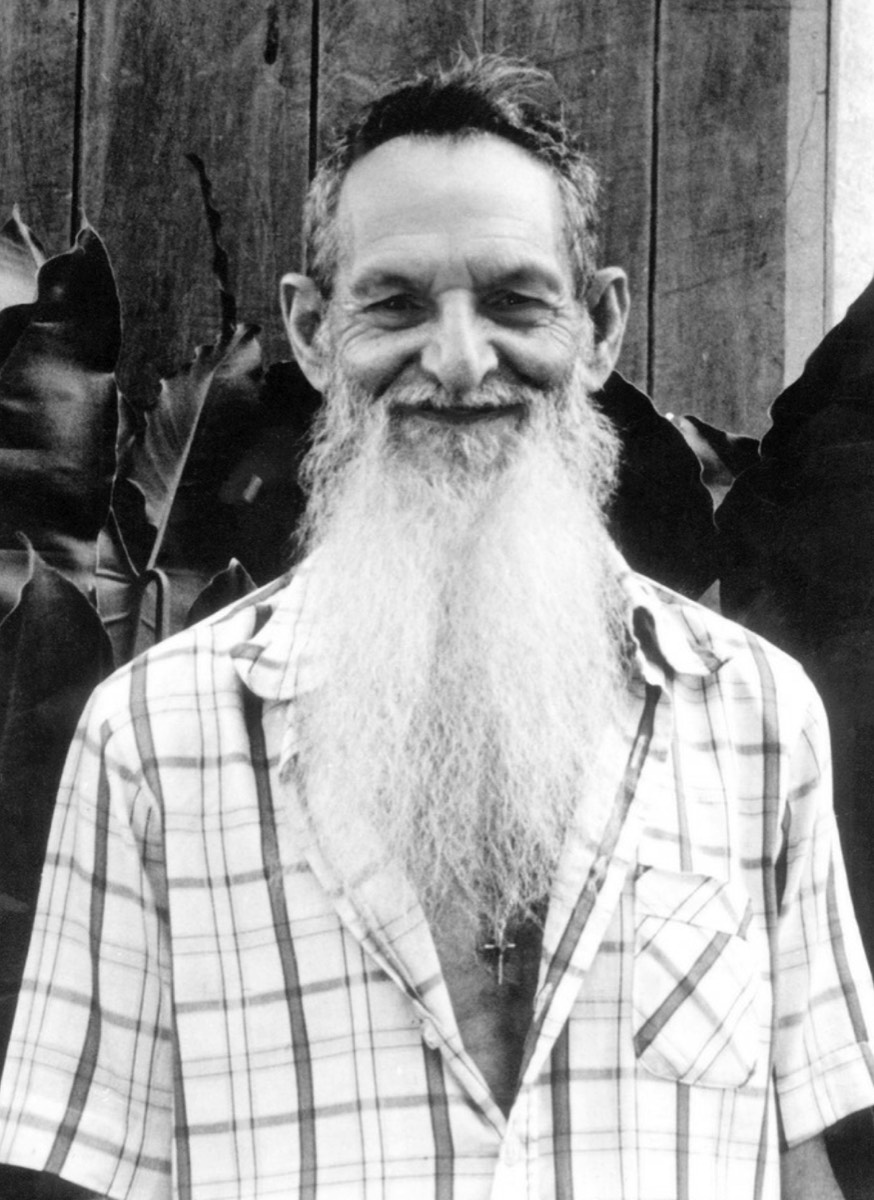
O Padrinho Sebastião

Sebastião Mota de Melo (Eirunepé, October 7, 1920 — Rio de Janeiro, January 20, 1990), also recognized as Padrinho Sebastião, was a significant religious figure in Brazil, notable for establishing the religious organization CEFLURIS, a prominent branch of Santo Daime.

== Biography ==
Sebastião Mota de Melo, born in Eirunepé, Amazonas, Brazil, exhibited a strong affinity for spiritual and religious exploration from an early age. Though his formal education details are limited, his religious journey notably flourished under the mentorship of Mestre Irineu, a key figure in the Santo Daime tradition. This mentorship significantly influenced Sebastião's understanding and practice of Santo Daime doctrines, leading him to a leadership role within the community. Following Mestre Irineu's passing in the mid-1970s, Sebastião, now known as Padrinho Sebastião, alongside a group of followers, initiated the community of Céu do Mapiá, and under Padrinho Sebastião's guidance, the community relocated to the heart of the Amazon rainforest.

=== Early life ===
Born to Manuel Mota and Dona Vicença, Padrinho Sebastião exhibited a propensity for astral travel and interactions with enchanted forest entities from a young age. He wed Rita Gregório and they had four children: Valdete, João Batista (who died during childhood), Alfredo, and Nonata. His journey with Daime commenced following an esophageal ailment, which led him to seek healing from various medical and spiritual sources. His initial attempt to connect with Mestre Irineu was delayed due to the latter's travels, but a subsequent encounter in 1965 facilitated his healing through Daime, thus cementing his allegiance to the practice.

=== Death ===
Sebastião died on January 20, 1990, in Rio de Janeiro, Brazil, at the age of 69. Following his death, leadership was transferred to one of his sons, Alfredo Gregório de Melo, and his legacy continues to be celebrated within the Santo Daime community and at Céu do Mapiá, where his wife Madrinha Rita, along with their children and grandchildren, continue his work, hosting visitors from all over the world who come to learn about Santo Daime and Padrinho Sebastião's teachings.

== Legacy ==
Padrinho Sebastião's legacy is deeply intertwined with the Santo Daime tradition, notably through founding CEFLURIS and establishing the community of Céu do Mapiá. His leadership, after Mestre Irineu's death, fostered a communitarian lifestyle in the Amazon, emphasizing spirituality over materiality. He was known in the faith for his healing and mediumship. He contributed to Amazonian ethnobotany and cultural preservation. His efforts propelled the Santo Daime Church into a global spiritual movement.

== See also ==
- Santo Daime hymns
