= Santo Daime hymns =

Sacred music and dance are fundamental to the Santo Daime religion. The earliest hymns are those of the founder, Raimundo Irineu Serra - 'Mestre Irineu'. While the rituals and music originated with a very few hymns, sung by a small group in the Brazilian Amazon, the practice of these spiritual works in diverse parts of the world since it began expansion around the beginning of the 1990s has given rise to a significant body of music, in many languages. Daimistas from Brazil and other countries have contributed to this growing genre, while continuing to sing the principle hinarios in Portuguese.

Among adherents to the doctrine, songs tend to be referred to as 'received' from a spiritual source rather than written from the writers mind alone and confirmed by their use in ritual. Variously these hymns may be viewed as 'calling' energies or divine entities, as transmitting sacred doctrine, as bringing healing through the act of singing what the community is affirming are eternal truths. In the spiritual works and communities of Santo Daime, the hymns are a bond of shared understanding and a daily practice. New hymns are often introduced in ceremony by those who receive them, by the leader's invitation.

A Santo Daime hinário (Portuguese) or hymn-book (hinario), can be a life work of its owner, chronicling that person's spiritual journey. During a ritual, one or several hinários or compilations may be sung in their entirety. While they are sung outside of the rituals in ensaio (practice) and listened to in various settings, the real distinction of is genre is that it is intended to be sung in ritual, by a group going into what is understood to be spiritual work of transformation. The hymns can be seen as integral to the ritual, the transformation, and the revealed messages as each person understands them. Hinarios that are central to the doctrine may be sung once or several times per year, and practiced many times more.

== Calendar of hinarios ==
The Santo Daime tradition does not have a unified, formal organizational structure so there is no single official calendar.

In the Mapia tradition, the hinario Mestre Irineu on the Virgin of Conception (Dec. 7), Christmas, Day of Kings (January 6), St. John (June 23). The hinario of Padrinho Sebastiao is sung on Mestre Irineu's birthday (Dec. 15), Saint Sebastian (January 19), Madrinha Rita's birthday (June 25), as well as Brazilian Father's Day. Padrinho Alfredo's hinario is sung on Padrinho Alfredo's birthday (January 7), St. Joseph (March 18), and Saint Peter (June 28), as well as New Year's Eve (December 31).

In some Alto Santo traditions, the hinario of Mestre Irineu is sung on the Virgin of the Conception, the anniversary of Mestre Irineu's birth (Dec. 25), Christmas, Epiphany (Three King's Day), St. Joseph, Saint Joseph, and on the anniversary of his death.

== Historical Hinarios ==
=== Raimundo Irineu Serra - 'Mestre Irineu' ===
'O Cruzeiro' (The Cross) or 'O Cruzeiro Universal' (The Universal Cross), which contains 'Cruzeirinho' (The Little Cross)
130 known hymns
2 unknown hymns

'A Santa Missa' (The Holy Mass)
10 known hymns

The first part of Mestre Irineu's hinário, O Cruzeiro, contains hymns up to number 116. After an interval of 11 years he received hymns 117 through 129 (or 130 if counting a nameless and unnumbered song between 126 and 127), which are now known as the Cruzeirinho or occasionally as the Hinos Novos. After the time of Mestre Irineu it became a more common practice to finish or close an hinario as a complete work, after which a new hinario might be received. There are also 2 other hymns which he did not publish and kept for himself, one of them only taught to his closest followers, totalizing 132 hymns in O Cruzeiro Universal.

=== Maria Marques Vieira - 'Maria Damião' ===
'O Mensageiro' (The Messenger)
49 known hymns

Maria Marques Vieira was born in Belém do Pará, in 1917. She was very young when she moved with her family to Rio Branco, Acre, where she met Mestre Irineu, in the early 1930s. She was sallow and blond with white skin. Maria Damião, as she was known, married and had seven children (one adopted) but lost her husband early. She worked hard to support her family but had many difficulties in her material life, as in her works with Santo Daime. She died of pneumonia, aged just 32 years, on 2 April 1949.

=== Antônio Gomes ===
'O Amor Divino' (The Divine Love)
39 known hymns

Antônio Gomes da Silva was born in Ceará, 30 April 1885. He married Maria de Nazaré in Ceará, and had five children. He lived in Belém do Pará for a while, and then moved to Rio Branco, Acre, in 1921. He worked as a seringueiro, or rubber tapper, and later as a farmer. He lost his first wife, married again, and had another four children. He met Mestre Irineu in 1938, and he received benefits for his unstable health. Antônio Gomes then became a member of the Santo Daime doctrine, as did his whole family. His son Leôncio became the new leader of Alto Santo, after Mestre Irineu's death, in 1971. His granddaughter, Peregrina Gomes, was the third wife of Mestre Irineu. Antônio Gomes da Silva died 14 August 1946.

=== Germano Guilherme ===
'Vós Sois Baliza' (Thou art a Beacon)
52 known hymns
1 Missa hymns

Germano Guilherme dos Santos was born in Piauí at the beginning of the 20th century. He moved with his family to Rio Branco, Acre, where he lived on the outskirts of the city working as a farmer. Germano was one of the first disciples of Mestre Irineu, becoming a member of Santo Daime in the 1930s. He was a black man with notably white teeth. Germano had special feelings for Mestre Irineu, and called him maninho, or 'my little brother'. He suffered a disease on his leg that bothered him a lot. Because of this, he couldn't eat some kinds of food. But when he was at maninho's house, Germano ate everything he wanted and didn't feel anything. He was married to Cecília Gomes, the daughter of Antônio Gomes and Maria de Nazaré, but had no children. His hinário is sung at CICLU - Alto Santo along with the O Cruzeiro hinário of Mestre Irineu. Germano Guilherme dos Santos died in 1964.

=== João Pereira ===
'Seis de Janeiro' (January 6; which is King's day, or Epiphany)
44 known hymns
1 Missa hymn
1 unknown hymn

João Pereira was born in Porongaba, Ceará, in the end of the 19th century. Nobody knows the date he moved to Rio Branco, Acre. In the early 1930s, he joined Mestre Irineu, and became one of his first disciples. João Pereira was almost bald, and his complexion was swarthy or similar to that of caboclos, the mixed blood people of the Amazonian region. He worked as a farmer and wagon driver. He lived near Rio Branco and was married with Maria Franco (Maria Marques Feitosa), the mother of the second wife of Mestre Irineu, Raimunda. João Pereira died in 1954.

=== Tetéu/Teteo (Francisco Fernandes Filho) ===
After Mestre Irineu passed on, his last wife's uncle Leôncio Gomes assumed command of the works, and in turn after Leôncio Gomes' passing, Francisco Fernandes Filho (Tetéu or Teteo) took over; however, he apparently very soon quarreled with Mestre Irineu's widow, Dona Peregrina Gomes Serra, and was chased out of Mestre Irineu's house (Alto Santo), according to Edward MacRae. Tetéu then founded a new center less than a kilometer away, declaring himself to be the real CICLU. Following Sr. Luis Mendes' presidency, Tetéu's eventual successor, Mr. João Rodrigues Facundes (who was also involved in the initial dispute), returned the legal name and charter of CICLU to Dona Peregrina.

Known for sleeping light and little, Tetéu received his nickname after a bird (Vanellus chilensis) commonly called "Tetéu" who was also believed to not sleep much. His hinario O Assesor has 132 hymns, including a number of Daime serving hymns (Eu Tomo Daime, O Daime Me Balançou, Mesa De Centro, Daime é O Nosso Pai, Um, Dois E Três) and is sung in some churches, where it is known, to honor the passing of Mestre Irineu on July 6. Where it is not known well, Mestre Irineu's hinario O Cruzeiro, is sung (a Capella in the churches of Sr. Luis Mendes).

=== Sebastião Mota de Melo - 'Padrinho Sebastião' ===
'O Justiceiro' and 'Nova Jerusalem' (The New Jerusalem)

Nova Jerusalem is the second and final hinario of Padrinho Sebastião, consisting of 26 hymns.

=== Mestre- Conselheiro Luiz Mendes do Nascimento - 'Padrinho Luiz' ===
He is the Patriarch of the CEFLI line (Centro Ecléctico Flor do Lótus Iluminando. Born January 4th, 1940 in the state of Acre, Brasil, husband to Madrinha Rizelda Brito do Nascimento, the daughter of Ana de Souza and Elias Brito, one of the first disciples of Master Irineu. They have 3 children, Saturnino, Solon, and Holderness. "While Master Ireneu was still alive, Luiz Mendes was proclaimed “official speaker” because of his ability to use spoken language in a highly spiritual manner."

'O Centenário', consisting of 132 hymns. 'Os Chamados', a healing work consisting of 42 hymns 'Novo Horizonte', consisting of 49 hymns

=== Rita Gregório de Melo- 'Madrinha Rita' ===
'Lua Branca' (White Moon)

Rita Gregório de Melo is the widow of Padrinho Sebastião, matriarch of the CEFLURIS line, mother of 11 children, and lives in Céu do Mapiá. She is thought to have been born 25 June 1925 in Rio Grande do Norte.

=== Alfredo Gregório de Melo - 'Padrinho Alfredo' ===
'O Cruzerinho', 'Nova Era' (The New Age) and 'Nova Dimensão'

Nova Dimensão is the third (yet to be completed) hinario of Padrinho Alfredo.

Alfredo Gregório de Melo, one of the sons of Padrinho Sebastião and Madrinha Rita, today heads the CEFLURIS line which Padrinho Sebastião founded, based in Céu do Mapiá, Amazonas. He was born 7 January 1950 in the seringal (rubber extraction area) Adélia along the Juruá river in the state of Amazonas.

=== Júlia Gregório da Silva - 'Madrinha Júlia' ===
'O Convite' (The Invitation)

Júlia Gregório da Silva was born in Açu, Rio Grande do Norte, in 1933. She was the younger sister of Madrinha Rita, and the mother of six children.

=== Cristina Raulino da Silva - 'Madrinha Cristina' ===
'A Mensagem' (The Message)

Cristina Raulino da Silva was born in Rio Branco, Acre, in 1938. She married Manuel Gregório (Padrinho Nel), the brother of Madrinha Rita.

=== João Pedro ===
João Pedro was a contemporary of Mestre Irineu. All we know is that his strong, healing hinário only became known to Santo Daime after his death.

=== Maria Brilhante ===
Maria Brilhante was married with Padrinho Eduardo Salles Freitas, and they had four children, three of whom survive. Madrinha Maria Brilhante received a hinário which is officially sung on the festival of St. Anthony every 12-13 June.

== Some Contemporary Hinários ==
=== Baixinha ===
'Guia Mestre' (Master Guide), 'Mensageiros da Cura' (Messengers of Healing), 'Hinário da Fé' (Hinario of the Faith), 'Estrela D'Água' (Star of the Water. Baixinha's new hinario)

Baixinha, tiny in Portuguese, is perhaps the best known practitioner of UmbanDaime. She is a small woman of scarcely one and a half meters, who has spent more than forty years in Umbanda, twenty-one in Candomblé, and eighteen years in Santo Daime. Despite her small stature, she was known by many as a true spiritual beacon and traveled extensively, even after she'd become very old. She led a spiritual community in Lumiar, a mountain village two hours from Rio de Janeiro until her passage in 2015 working in two worlds (spiritual and physical) and two doctrines (Daimista and Umbandista).

=== Glauco Villas Boas ===
'O Chaveirinho' & 'O Chaveirão'

Hinário received by prominent cartoonist Glauco Villas Boas (March 10, 1957 - March 12, 2010), commander of the Céu de Maria church in São Paulo, and consisting of 41 hymns in O Chaveirinho and 11 in O Chaveirão.

As one of the renown artists of Brazil in the late 20th century, he formed a bond with fellow cartoonists Laerte and Angeli that produced a prolific amount of work over decades. As a daily political cartoonist for Folha de São Paulo (Sao Paulo's principal daily newspaper), he was looked to by Paulistas to interpret and shed light on the news of the day in his own style.

While participating in early works at Flor das Aguas in Itapecerica da Serra (SP), Glauco inaugurated Ceu de Maria in his own home, then built a church on a peak high above Sao Paulo called Pico do Jaraguá. An accomplished musician, he was well known for his fiery accordion playing and said that he had never once practiced outside of ceremony, relying instead on the force of the Daime to pull the music.

=== Alex Polari ===
'Nova Anunciação'

Alex Polari spent years as a political prisoner during the rule of the military junta in Brazil, enduring torture, brutality, and deprivation. His quest for spiritual initiation eventually led him deep into the heart of the rainforest, to Mapiá, where he became a teacher and leader of the Santo Daime community. He is the author of 'Forest of Visions: Ayahuasca, Amazonian Spirituality, and the Santo Daime Tradition' which has been translated into English.

=== Paulo Roberto ===
Luz na Escuridão (A Light In The Darkness) is the first hinário (of four) received by Paulo Roberto (Paulo Roberto Silva e Souza), padrinho of the Céu do Mar church in Rio de Janeiro.

== Selections from Hinarios ==
(often sung as part of rituals)

=== Oração ===
Oração simply means prayer. In Daimista communities and households, it is normally sung around 6:30pm, in church or at home, with or without instruments. The oração of CEFLURIS consists of a selection of 12 hymns from Padrinho Sebastião's O Justiceiro hinário (or hymnbook), plus one from his son Padrinho Alfredo's O Cruzeirinho hinário, and a new one from Sebastião's daughter Madrinha Nonata.

=== Cura ===
(Divided into parts I and II)

The Cura is a selection of 32 healing hymns in two parts, taken mainly from the hinários of Padrinho Sebastião, Madrinha Rita, and Padrinho Alfredo, but also including a few from Mestre Irineu, Alex Polari, Vera Froes and Madrinha Tetê (Teresa Gregório), often used on occasions when healing is required, in particular physical healing.

=== Companheiros ===
Companheiros is a compendium of the hinarios of Antonio Gomes, Maria Damião, Germano Guilherme and João Pereira, among the earliest followers of Mestre Irineu. Often also referred to as Finados. The group of people referred to here is known as Companheiros, as in Companions of Mestre Irineu, whereas Finados specifically refers to the act of singing these four hinarios for All Saints Day.

== External links and references ==
- ICEFLU A site for Hymns and Hymnal recordings
- Mestre Irineu - Santo Daime. Site do centro de iluminação cristã luz universal
- SantoDaime.org Hymns (Portuguese)
- Sheet Music for Principal Hymnals (partituras)
- Audio for Principal Hymnals (rapid one click download)
- Hinos do Santo Daime
- Santo Daime Hymnen- Texte + MP3 free Download.
- Lines of the Santo Daime, Personal Accounts of Mestre Irineu
