= Purus River =

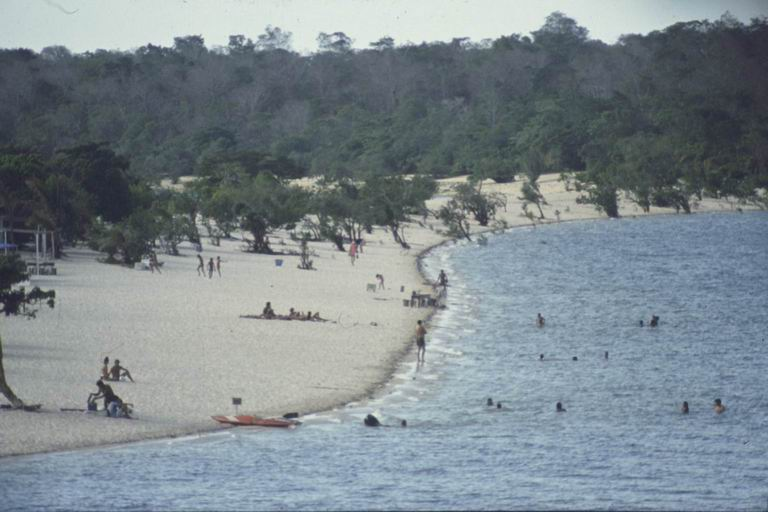
- Purus River

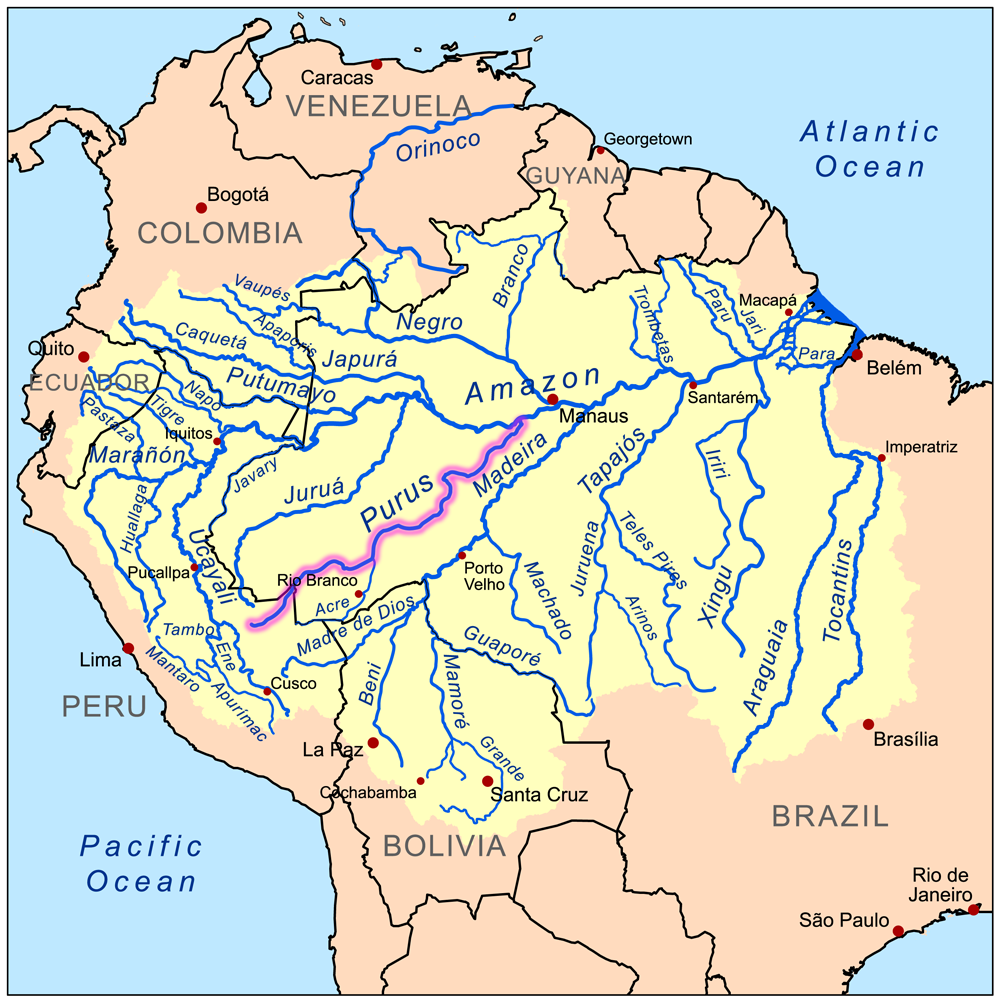
- Map of the Amazon Basin with the Purus River highlighted

Location
- Country: Brazil, Peru

Physical characteristics
- Source: Confluence of Cujar and Curiuja rivers
  - location: Ucayali Region, Peru
  - coordinates: 10°44′56″S 71°47′14″W
  - elevation: 330 m (1,080 ft)
- 2nd source: Most distant source approximate area. Headwaters of Cujar River.
  - location: Ucayali Region, Peru
  - coordinates: 10°42′52″S 72°26′44″W
  - elevation: 498 m (1,634 ft) 520 m (1,710 ft)
- Mouth
  - coordinates: 3°41′35″S 61°28′12″W
  - elevation: 11 m (36 ft)
- Length: 3,361.02 km (2,088.44 mi) 3,382 km (2,101 mi)
- Basin size: 371,042 km^{2} (143,260 mi^{2}) to 376,600 km^{2} (145,400 mi^{2})
- Discharge
  - location: Confluencia of Solimões, Amazonas State (near mouth)
  - average: (Period: 1973–1990) 10,970 m^{3}/s (387,000 cu ft/s) (Period: 1979–2015) 11,206.9 m^{3}/s (395,770 cu ft/s)
- Discharge
  - location: Arumã-Jusante, Amazonas State (359,853 km^{2} (138,940 sq mi))
  - average: (Period of data: 1970–1996) 10,469 m^{3}/s (369,700 cu ft/s)
- Discharge
  - location: Lábrea, Amazonas State (Basin size: 220,351 km^{2} (85,078 sq mi))
  - average: (Period of data: 1970–1996) 5,569 m^{3}/s (196,700 cu ft/s)

Basin features
- Progression: Amazon → Atlantic Ocean
- River system: Solimões
- Tributaries
  - left: Inauini, Pauini, Tapauá
  - right: Chandless, Iaco, Acre, Sepatini, Ituxi, Mucuim, Itaparaná

The Purus River (Portuguese: Rio Purus; Spanish: Río Purús) is a tributary of the Amazon River in South America. Its drainage basin is 371,042 km^{2} (143,260 sq mi), and the mean annual discharge is 11,207 m^{3}/s (395,800 cu ft/s). The river shares its name with the Alto Purús National Park and the Purús Province (and its conformed Purús District), one of the four provinces of Peru in the Ucayali Region.

== Geography ==
The Purus River rises in Peru. It defines the boundary between Peru and Brazil in the centre of the state of Acre, then runs for a short distance along the boundary of the 231,555-hectare (572,180-acre) Santa Rosa do Purus National Forest, a sustainable use conservation unit created in 2001, after it is joined by the Santa Rosa River. The Purus then flows north east through Manoel Urbano It runs through a continuous forest at the bottom of the great depression, lying between the Madeira River, which skirts the edge of the Brazilian sandstone plateau, and the Ucayali River, which hugs the base of the Andes.

In the state of Amazonas the river runs through the 133,637 ha (330,220-acre) Arapixi Extractive Reserve, created in 2006, and past the town of Boca do Acre at the end of the BR-317 highway. Further down, it forms the west boundary of the 256,000 ha (630,000-acre) Purus National Forest, created in 1988. From the town of Pauini down to the town of Lábrea the river is bordered by the 604,209 ha (1,493,030-acre) Médio Purus Extractive Reserve, created in 2008. Below this it runs through the 197,986 ha (489,230-acre) Canutama Extractive Reserve along the stretch between the towns of Lábrea and Canutama. In the lowest reaches the river flows through the 1,008,167 ha (2,491,230-acre) Piagaçu-Purus Sustainable Development Reserve, established in 2003, which holds a large part of its floodplain. It enters the Amazon River west of the Madeira River, which it parallels as far south as the falls of the latter stream.

William Chandless found its elevation above sea level to be only 107 feet (33 m) 590 miles (950 km) from its mouth. It is one of the most crooked streams in the world, and its length in a straight line is less than half of its length following its curves. It is practically only a drainage ditch for the half-submerged, lake-flooded district it crosses. Its width is very uniform for 1,000 miles (1,600 km) up, and for 800 miles (1,300 km) its depth is never less than 45 feet (14 m).

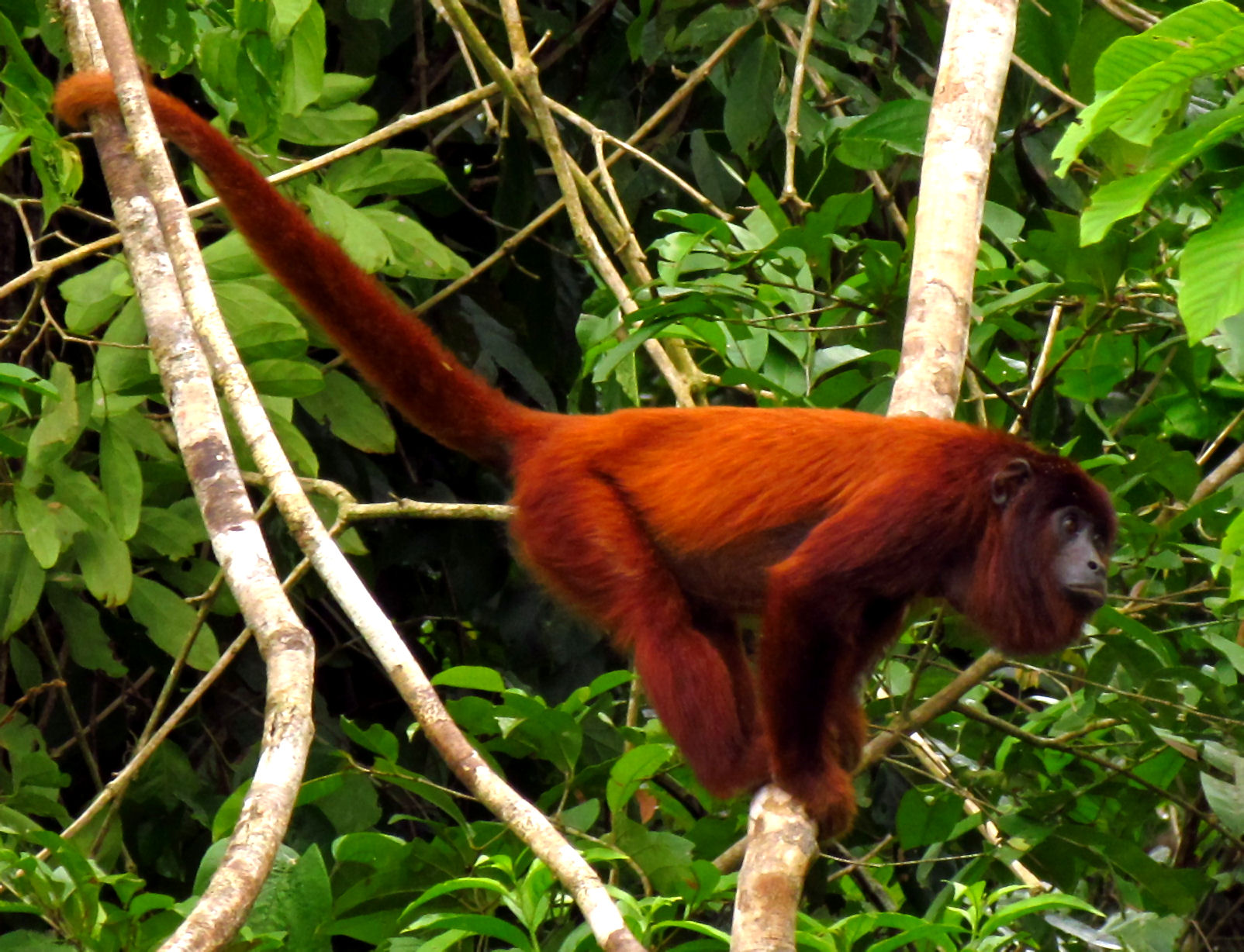
Purus red howler monkey

== Biodiversity ==
The Purús red howler (Alouatta puruensis) is a species of howler monkey native to Brazil, Peru and north of Bolivia. Peckoltia brevis, a kind of catfish, is found in the middle and upper Amazon within the Purus river basin.

Most of the central and lower sections of the river flow through the Purus várzea ecoregion. In the municipality of Tapauá, Amazonas, the river flows through the 233,864-hectare (577,890-acre) Abufari Biological Reserve, a strictly protected area.

== Earthworks discovery ==
In 2008, a previously unknown pre-Columbian civilization was discovered in the upper region of the river close to the Bolivian border. After much of the forest in the region was cleared for agricultural use, satellite pictures revealed the remains of large geometric earthworks.

== See also ==
- Amazon rainforest
- Esperanza, Ucayali
- Brazilian Amazon
- Peruvian Amazon
- River basin
- Catauxi
