= Mapiá-Inauini National Forest =

National forest in the state of Amazonas, Brazil

- Floresta Nacional Mapiá-Inauini
- IUCN category VI (protected area with sustainable use of natural resources)
- Location within Brazil
- Coordinates: 8°15′40″S 68°08′35″W
- Area: 311,000 hectares (770,000 acres)
- Designation: National forest
- Created: 14 August 1989
- Administrator: ICMBio

The Mapiá-Inauini National Forest (Portuguese: Floresta Nacional Mapiá-Inauini) is a national forest in the state of Amazonas, Brazil.

== Location ==
The Mapiá-Inauini National Forest is divided between the municipalities of Boca do Acre (92.37%) and Pauini (7.63%) in the state of Amazonas. It has an area of 311,000 hectares (770,000 acres). The national forest is in the Purus River basin. The forest adjoins the Purus National Forest to the east and the Arapixi Extractive Reserve to the south. The Inauini/Teuini Indigenous Territory is to the north and the Igarapé Capanã.and Camicuã indigenous territories adjoin the forest to the south. The national forest overlaps 1.39% with indigenous territories.

== Environment and economy ==
Vegetation is 70% dense rainforest and 30% open rainforest. The residents gather Brazil nuts and plant cassava to make flour, selling the nuts and flour in Boca do Acre. Although there were several communities on the banks of the São Francisco and São Domingos streams and the Inauini River, in 2003 the forest seemed well-preserved. The local people have complained that many people come up the Inauini by boat and fish in nearby lakes. The intruders also collect turtles, which has led to a sharp drop in the turtle population.

== History ==
The Mapiá-Inauini National Forest was created by federal decree 98.051 of 14 August 1989, with an area of about 311,000 hectares (770,000 acres). It is administered by the Chico Mendes Institute for Biodiversity Conservation (ICMBio). It is classed as IUCN protected area category VI (protected area with sustainable use of natural resources). The objectives are sustainable multiple use of forest resources, and scientific research with emphasis on methods of sustainable exploitation of native forests.

On 26 September 2005 the Instituto Nacional de Colonização e Reforma Agrária (INCRA – National Institute for Colonization and Agrarian Reform) recognised the state forest as supporting 100 families of small rural producers, who would qualify for PRONAF support. This was modified to 200 families on 31 December 2008. The management plan was approved on 18 August 2009. The consultative council was created on 11 March 2010.

== Sources ==
- Flona Mapiá-Inauini (in Portuguese), ICMBio: Chico Mendes Institute for Biodiversity Conservation
- FLONA Mapiá-Inauini (in Portuguese), ISA: Instituto Socioambiental
- Unidade de Conservação: Floresta Nacional de Mapiá-Inauini (in Portuguese), MMA: Ministério do Meio Ambiente
