= Clysma =

Ancient city in Egypt

- Κλῦσμα (Ancient Greek)
- Location within Egypt
- 29°57′16.6″N 32°34′26.3″E
- Type: Settlement
- Location: Suez, Suez Governorate, Egypt

Clysma (Greek: Κλῦσμα, romanized: Klŷsma, lit. 'surf, waves that break'; Coptic: ⲡⲉⲕⲗⲟⲩⲥⲙⲁ, romanized: Peklousma; Arabic: القلزم, romanized: al-Qulzum) was an ancient city and bishopric in Egypt. It was located at the head of the Gulf of Suez. The city was founded or rebuilt by Emperor Trajan in the second century AD to protect travellers and merchants.

== History ==
Clysma was founded or rebuilt by Emperor Trajan in the second century AD to protect travellers and merchants as it lay at the junction of roads from Sinai, Palestine, and Egypt. This was done in conjunction with the construction of the Amnis Traianus, a canal that linked the Nile and the Red Sea and had its outlet near Clysma. It has been suggested that the port was used for the exportation of textiles and grain produced in the Arsinoite nome as they were better adapted to transportation via the Amnis Traianus to Clysma than overland to the southern ports of Berenice Troglodytica and Myos Hormos.

Clysma is first recorded in Lucian's Alexander Pseudomantis in the early 2nd century AD, and by Ptolemy in Geographia in the mid-2nd century, in which he described Clysma as a phrourion. In 179, soldiers of the Ala Veterana Gallica were stationed at the city. Clysma is also described in the works of Hierocles as a kastron, and is recorded in the Panarion of Saint Epiphanius of Salamis. As well as this, church historians Eusebius in Onomastikon and Philostorgius in Historia Ecclesiastica make reference to the city. Saint Eugenios of Clysma is said to have studied as a monk at Clysma.

The nearby Mountain of Antony, also known as the Mountain of Clysma, was inhabited by anchorites, such as Saint John the Dwarf, and Saint Sisoes the Great, who died there in 409 and 429, respectively. The destruction of the Nile emporium of Koptos, from where goods were transported overland to Berenice and Myos Hormos, by Emperor Diocletian in the late third century temporarily disrupted trade at the southern ports and led to an increase of trade at Clysma which reached its peak in the fourth and fifth centuries. A commercius, an official with responsibility for foreign trade, was active at Clysma during the reign of Emperor Anastasius I Dicorus. Clysma is recorded on the Tabula Peutingeriana.

In response to an appeal for aid, in c. 525, Emperor Justin I had Clysma provide twenty vessels to the king of Ethiopia in his war with the king of Himyar. The Plague of Justinian likely first entered the Roman Empire through the port of Clysma, and thus spread to Pelusium, where it was first reported in mid-July 541. According to Eutychius of Alexandria, a church of Saint Athanasius was constructed at Clysma on the orders of Emperor Justinian I. In c. 570, Clysma was visited by the anonymous pilgrim of Piacenza, who noted eighteen or more tombs of hermits at the city's basilica.

After the Muslim conquest of Egypt, Clysma was known in Arabic as al-Ḳulzum, and the Red Sea was known as the Baḥr al-Ḳulzum (sea of Clysma).

== Ecclesiastical history ==
The diocese of Clysma was a suffragan of the Archdiocese of Leontopolis. Jacob was bishop of Clysma before 347, Titus/Paul was bishop in 347, and Poimen was bishop from 458 to 459. Stephen, Bishop of Clysma, attended the Second Council of Constantinople in 553. The Roman Catholic Church nominally revived Clysma as a titular see, and has had the following incumbents:

- Pio Gallizia, B. (1741.01.25 – 1745.03.23)
- Paul-Jules-Narcisse Rémond (1921.04.09 – 1930.05.20)
- Albert-Pierre Falière, M.E.P. (1930.06.25 – 1955.01.01)
- Teofilo Camomot Bastida (1955.03.23 – 1958.06.10)
- Joannes Antonius Eduardus van Dodewaard (1958.07.01 – 1960.06.27)
- Wladyslaw Jedruszuk (1962.11.19 – 1991.06.05)

== Popular culture ==
Clysma appears in the 2017 video game Assassin's Creed Origins expansion The Hidden Ones.

== See also ==
- List of ancient Egyptian towns and cities

== Bibliography ==
- Cohen, Getzel M. (2006). The Hellenistic Settlements in Syria, the Red Sea Basin, and North Africa. University of California Press. ISBN 9780520931022.
- Coquin, René-Georges; Martin, Maurice (1991). "Clysma". Claremont Coptic Encyclopedia, vol. 2.
- DuBois, Michael S. (2015). Auxillae: A Compendium of Non-Legionary Units of the Roman Empire.
- Honigmann, E.; Ebied, R. Y. (2012). "al-Ḳulzum". Encyclopaedia of Islam, Second Edition.
- Mayerson, Philip (1996). "The Port of Clysma (Suez) in Transition from Roman to Arab Rule". Journal of Near Eastern Studies. 55 (2). The University of Chicago Press: 119–126. doi:10.1086/373802. JSTOR 546035. S2CID 163029985.
- Peust, Carsten (2010). Die Toponyme vorarabischen Ursprungs im modernen Ägypte (PDF) (in German). Göttingen.
- Tsiamis, Costas; Poulakou-Rebelakou, Effie; Petridou, Eleni (2009). "The Red Sea and the Port of Clysma. A Possible Gate of Justinian's Plague" (PDF). Gesnerus. 66 (2): 209–217. doi:10.1163/22977953-06602002. PMID 20405770.
- Young, Gary K. (2003). Rome's Eastern Trade: International Commerce and Imperial Policy 31 BC - AD 305. Routledge. ISBN 9781134547937.
- Worp, K.A. (1994). "A Checklist of Bishops in Byzantine Egypt (A.D. 325- C. 750)" (PDF). Zeitschrift für Papyrologie und Epigraphik. 100: 283–318.
