= Inauini River =

- Location within Brazil
- Native name: Rio Inauini (Portuguese)

Location
- Country: Brazil

Physical characteristics
- Source
  - location: Amazonas state
- Mouth
  - location: Purus River
  - coordinates: 8.506227°S 67.413623°W

Inauini River (Portuguese: Rio Inauini) is a river of Amazonas state in north-western Brazil, a tributary of the Purus River.

The Inauini River forms the boundary between the Mapiá-Inauini National Forest and the Purus National Forest. The local people have complained that many people come up the Inauini by boat and fish in nearby lakes. The intruders also collect turtles, which has led to a sharp drop in the turtle population.

== See also ==
- List of rivers of Amazonas

== Sources ==
- FLONA Mapiá-Inauini (in Portuguese), ISA: Instituto Socioambiental
