= Céu do Mapiá =

- Village
- Vila de Céu do Mapiá
- Nickname: Mapiá
- Location in Brazil
- Coordinates: 08°17′41″S 67°36′56″W
- Country: Brazil
- Region: North
- State: Amazonas
- Municipality: Pauini
- Founded: 1983

Government
  - Founder: Sebastião Mota de Melo

Area
  - Total: 2,500 km^{2} (970 sq mi)
- Elevation: 100 m (330 ft)

Population (2009)
  - Total: 700
- Time zone: UTC-5 (BRST-2)
  - Summer (DST): UTC-5 (DST not used)
- Postal Code: 69860-000
- Area code: +55 97
- Climate: Am

Céu do Mapiá (Portuguese for "Heaven of the Mapiá [river]") is a Brazilian village founded in 1983 by Sebastião Mota de Melo. It is located in the headwaters of Igarapé (river) Mapiá, 19 miles (31 km) from the Purus River, in Amazonian South mesoregion, between the Purus and Boca do Acre microregions, in the municipality of Pauini, state of Amazonas.

The village is located within the Inauini-Pauini National Reserve - one of the best-preserved areas of the western Brazilian Amazon. In 1990, with the community's support, the Brazilian government created by the Decree No. 96 190, of June 21, 1988 the Purus National Forest, with an area of 256,000 ha and the village of Céu do Mapiá as a kind of unofficial capital.

The village is the headquarters of ICEFLU (formerly called CEFLURIS), a branch (also founded by Sebastião Mota de Melo) of the Santo Daime religion.
