= Around the World in 80 Faiths =

- Around the World in 80 Faiths titlecard
- Genre: Religious, Documentary film, Adventure travel, television program
- Directed by: Sian Salt; Tom Sheahan; Karen Selway; Graham Johnston; Rob Cowling; Kevin Jarvis
- Presented by: Pete Owen-Jones
- Composers: James Atherton; Johnny Clifford
- Country of origin: United Kingdom
- Original language: English
- No. of series: 1
- No. of episodes: 8

Production
- Executive producer: Jean Claude Bragard
- Producers: Sian Salt; Tom Sheahan; Karen Selway; Graham Johnston; Rob Cowling; Kevin Jarvis
- Production location: Worldwide
- Editors: Steve Stevenson; Ivan Probert; Dave Reynolds; James Marson
- Camera setup: Graham Veevers & Self Shot by Directors
- Running time: 60 minutes
- Production company: BBC Television

Original release
- Network: BBC Two, BBC HD
- Release: 2 January – 20 February 2009

Around the World in 80 Faiths is a British television series which was first broadcast by the BBC on 2 January 2009. The series was presented by Anglican vicar Pete Owen-Jones, who was researching the various faiths from around the world.

There was also a book planned to accompany the series, written by Owen-Jones and published by BBC Books, but the book is not published.

== Episodes ==
The series was presented in eight episodes with the last one airing on 20 February 2009:

=== Episode One: Australasia and the Pacific Ring of Fire ===
Directed & Produced by Sian Salt, Camera Graham Veevers

- Faith 1: Islam and Spirit Worship: Attends a sword-stabbing ritual performed by the Bugis people of Sulawesi, Indonesia.
- Faith 2: Christianity and Ancestor worship – Attends a funeral rite performed by the Torajans of Sulawesi, Indonesia and reflects on their relationship with the dead.
- Faith 3: Catholic Carabao festival: Visits the annual town festival of Pulilan, Bulacan, Philippines in honour of the town's patron saint, San Isidro Labrador. Carabaos, the traditional beast of burden, are made to kneel by the church's doors in veneration of the saint.
- Faith 4: Catholic fertility ritual: Attends the Obando Fertility Rites in Obando, Bulacan, Philippines, a three-day pagan fertility festival now held to honour three Catholic saints. Locals dance to pray for fertility, out of tradition for past successful dances, and just to be a part of the festival. A priest prays and preaches before directing a large dance inside Obando Church. Peter reflects on the cross-fertilization between Catholicism and animism and suggests that instead of the Catholics simply incorporating the dance into a prayer to the saints the festival may instead be a mutual coupling of fertility and creation.
- Faith 5: Aboriginal Dreaming: Visits Alice Springs to meet with the Indigenous Australian people, the Aboriginals, to witness a baby smoking ritual. Peter accompanies a group of locals on a trip to find the bush used in the ritual. A baby is then held in a small sand pit containing smoldering leaves for a few seconds at a time. A local tells him that the ritual is done so that the baby will be healthy and strong. Peter hoped to witness some of the Aboriginal Dreaming rituals, however, a local tells him that baby smoking is not related to Dreamtime. Peter reflects that the ritual seems to have lost its meaning as the locals are sparse in their explanation of the spiritual aspects of the event. The women of the group then remove their shirts and paint their chest and arms. With feathers in their hair, they dance around a fire. The women tell Peter they are Christian and do not know of the old Aboriginal religion.
- Faith 6: The Iraqi Mandaeans: Attends a regular baptism service inspired by John the Baptist and performed by the persecuted Mandaeans of Iraq in a park in Sydney, Australia.
- Faith 7: Urban witchcraft: Visits a group of witches who have established their coven, led by Tim Hartridge, within Sydney, Australia.
- Faith 8: Indigenous Kastom: Meets practitioners of the tribal faith of Kastomism on the South Pacific island of Tanna, Vanuatu.
- Faith 9: John Frum cult – Meets practitioners of the new religion of John Frum of Tanna, inspired by the American presence on the island after the World War II.
- Faith 10: Prophet Fred and Unity: Witnesses the religion of Unity and interviews their prophet, Fred from Tanna and Killian.

=== Episode Two: The Far East ===
Directed, Filmed & Series Produced by Graham Johnston

- Faith 11: Japanese Shinto: Witnesses the cleansing, Shinto fire festival of Shingū, Wakayama, Japan.
- Faith 12: Buddhism, Hadaka Matsuri (The Naked Man festival) – Visits the Buddhist fertility festival at Okayama, Japan.
- Faith 13: Hindu street shrine – Visits a busy, popular Hindu shrine in downtown Bangkok used by Buddhist worshippers.
- Faith 14: Theravada Buddhism – Interviews a monk of Theravada Buddhism, describing its importance in Thailand.
- Faith 14 1/2: Unfilmed Tibetan Buddhist festival in China, because Chinese officials issued the host & crew visas only after the completion of this religious festival, hinting at a long lasting state animosity to religion.
- Faith 15: Confucianism – Looking at the Confucian religion within communist China.
- Faith 16: Chinese Taoism – Interviews a solitary Taoist monk on Mount Hua, China about Taoism.
- Faith 17: Korean Pentecostalism: Reflects on the rise of Pentecostalism in South Korea and visits the Yoido Full Gospel Church in Seoul, recognized by the Guinness Book of World Records as having the world's largest congregation.
- Faith 18: Korean Shamanism – Visits a shaman in rural South Korea and reflects on the possible revival of Korean shamanism.
- Faith 19: Cao Dai – Visits the headquarters of the recently created religion of Cao Dai at Tay Ninh, Vietnam.
- Faith 20: Mother Goddess – Attends a ceremony celebrating the Vietnamese spirit religion of the Mother goddess.

=== Episode Three: Africa ===
Directed, filmed & produced by Tom Sheahan

- Faith 21: Voodoo – Mamywata: Benin fishermen in Cotonou perform ritual to serpent goddess Mamywata.
- Faith 22: Voodoo – Gris Gris: Visits the fetish market in Cotonou, Benin to see various dead animal parts. Practitioners claim these heal common ailments.
- Faith 23: Voodoo – Church of Thron: Peter attends a Sunday service involving animal sacrifice in Cotonou, Benin.
- Faith 24: San Trance Dance: San Bushmen from near Ghanzi, Botswana, perform a trance dance and reflect on modern encroachments on their religious practice.
- Faith 25: Zulu Sangomas: Visits a Zulu Sangoma in Johannesburg, South Africa to contact the spirit of the ancestors.
- Faith 26: Twelfth Apostolic Church: Witnesses an outdoor prayer meeting in Hillbrow, Johannesburg, South Africa, where rituals involving healing and protection through the intercession of the Holy Spirit are key.
- Faith 27: Afrikaner Calvinism: Attends a prayer meeting at home in Groot Marico, South Africa where worshippers believe the world will end by 2020.
- Faith 28: Rastafari: Visits a community of Jamaicans, four hours drive from Addis Ababa, Ethiopia who believe Haile Selassie I is their messiah and that they are now in Zion.
- Faith 29: Ethiopian Islam: Visits a tearoom beside a mosque in Negash, Tigray, Ethiopia to chew khat.
- Faith 30: Ethiopian Orthodox Christianity: Witnesses a church service for the feast of St Michael at the Church of Mikael Imba, Tigray, Ethiopia and is moved to tears by the warmth of human love he witnesses.

=== Episode Four: The Middle East ===
Directed, filmed & produced by Tom Sheahan

- Faith 31: African Hebrew Israelites: Participates in a prayer meeting at the Village of Peace, Dimona, Israel.
- Faith 32: Christianity: Walks the Via Dolorosa on Good Friday and visits the Church of the Holy Sepulchre, Jerusalem.
- Faith 33: Judaism: Witnesses Purim celebrations at the Jerusalem Great Synagogue, and in the ultra-orthodox district of Me'a She'arim, Jerusalem, Israel.
- Faith 34: Sunni Islam: Discusses the tenets of the Sunni faith at the Umayyad Mosque, Damascus, Syria.
- Faith 35: Sufism: Witnesses whirling dervishes in a house beside a 14th-century mosque in Aleppo, Syria.
- Faith 36: Alevi: Takes part in a cem ritual in a cemevi in a suburb of Istanbul, Turkey.
- Faith 37: Yazidi: Witnesses the Yazidi New Year celebrations in a village near Mosul, Iraq and at Lalish meets the current Yazidi leader. Yazidis' gatherings are cautious and persecuted because they are labelled 'satanist' by neighbours.
- Faith 38: Samaritan: Attends the Samaritan Passover celebrations on Mount Gerizim, near Nablus, West Bank.
- Faith 39: Baháʼí: Attends the Festival of Ridván at the Shrine of the Báb, Haifa, Israel.

=== Episode Five: USA ===
Directed & Produced by Karen Selway. Camera Graham Veevers

- Faith 40: Snake handling: Witnesses a prayer meeting involving holding venomous snakes at the Edwina Church of God in Jesus Christ's Name, Newport, Tennessee.
- Faith 41: Baptist preacher prodigy: Attends a prayer meeting conducted by 10-year-old minister Jared Sawyer Jr at the Greater Travelers' Rest Baptist Church, Decatur, Georgia.
- Faith 42: Evangelical revival: Witnesses a prayer meeting and a laying-on of hands at the Ignited Church, Lakeland, Florida.
- Faith 43: Spiritualism: Attends a séance at the Cassadaga Spiritualist Camp, Cassadaga, Florida.
- Faith 44: Navajo sweat lodge: Joins members of the Navajo in a sweat lodge in the Arizona desert.
- Faith 45: Mormons: Discusses Mormon theology at the Church of Jesus Christ of Latter-day Saints (LDS Church), Salt Lake City, Utah.
- Faith 46: Religious polygamists: Interviews religious polygamists in St George, Utah who have broken with the LDS church over its attitude to polygamy.
- Faith 47: All Saints Episcopalian Church: Witnesses a same-sex marriage ceremony at the All Saints Episcopalian Church, Pasadena, California.
- Faith 48: Summum: Visits the Summum Pyramid in Salt Lake City, Utah.
- Faith 49: Burning Man festival: Attends the annual event in Black Rock Desert, northern Nevada.

=== Episode Six: India and Nepal ===
Directed, filmed & series produced by Graham Johnston

- Faith 50: Tibetan Buddhism Witnesses a tara ritual at Kutsab Ternga monastery, near Jomsom, Mustang district, Nepal.
- Faith 51: Hinduism: Muktinath Walks through 108 waterspouts at the Stupa of Muktinath, near Jomsom, Mustang district, Nepal.
- Faith 52: Hindu/Buddhist: Child blessing. Attends a child blessing in a house in Kathmandu, Nepal.
- Faith 53: Hinduism: The Durga Puja festival. Witnesses the Durga Puja festival in Calcutta, India.
- Faith 54: Hindu Aghoris: Meets an aghori in Tarapith, West Bengal, India.
- Faith 55: The Bishnoi: Visits The Bishnoi and discusses their belief system in Rajasthan, India
- Faith 56: The Nath Firewalkers: Witnesses Fire walking at Purnima in Rajasthan, India.
- Faith 57: Zoroastrianism: Attends a Parsi wedding at the Parsi Fire Temple, Mumbai, India.
- Faith 58: Sikhism: Attends the 300th anniversary of the consecration of the Guru Granth Sahib at Nanded, Maharashtra, India.
- Faith 59: Jainism: Witnesses celebrations at the monolithic statue of Lord Gomateshwara, Shravanabelagola, Hassan district, India and here meets a Jain wandering nun, which proves to be a moving experience.
- Faith 60: Hindu Gorehabba ritual: Takes part in the Gorehabba ritual during Diwali at Gummatapura, a village on the Karnataka-Tamil Nadu border, southern India.

=== Episode Seven: Latin America ===
Directed & produced by Rob Cowling. Camera Graham Veevers

- Faith 61: Roman Catholicism in Mexico: Attends Midnight Mass at the basilica of Our Lady of Guadalupe, Mexico City, Mexico
- Faith 62: Santa Muerte, Folk Catholicism: Witnesses prayers to Santa Muerte (Spanish for Saint Death, which is a sacred figure and feminine skeletal folk saint), Barrio de Tepito, Mexico City. Also sees devotee of Santa Muerte being tattooed.

Peter Owen Jones then visited Bolivia, mentioning how the current president is the first native ethnic president of Bolivia.

- Faith 63: El Tio: Witnesses offerings to El Tio figure, a mine god at Cerro Rico mine, Bolivia
- Faith 64: Pachamama: Witnesses llama sacrifice on hill above Sampaya, Bolivia
- Faith 65: Roman Catholic Church: Automobile blessing outside the basilica of the Virgen de la Candelaria, Copacabana, Bolivia
- Faith 66: Pentecostalism: Cleansing and exorcism of prisoners at Benfica detention centre, Leopoldina, Rio de Janeiro, Brazil by Assemblies of God minister. Minister later exorcises Owen-Jones in attempt to stop him smoking.
- Faith 67: Candomblé: Witnesses Samba Day celebrations and orixa possession
- Faith 68: Templo da Boa Vontade (Temple of Goodwill): Meditation at a pyramid-shaped structure in Brasília.
- Faith 69: Valley of Dawn: Takes part in the Vale do Amanhecer ritual, a spirit reading, at location near Planaltina, Brazil which proves to be a nerve-racking experience.
- Faith 70: Santo Daime: Takes part in Ayahuasca service where participants drink powerful substance that is said to induce a higher state of consciousness and reveal aspects of an individual's inner divine self. Location: Ceu do Mapia, Acre, Brazil

=== Episode Eight: Europe ===
Directed, filmed and produced by Kevin Jarvis

- Faith 71: Norwegian Lutheran Church: Attends a Lutheran baptism at Sussjavri, Lapland, northern Norway
- Faith 72: Sami shamanism: Witnesses a spiritual invocation of ancestors (Yoik) at Vesterama Sami Camp, Lapland, northern Norway
- Faith 73: Judaism in Lithuania: Attends Shabbat prayers and meal in Vilnius, Lithuania
- Faith 74: Christianity: Visits the Hill of Crosses, 12 km north of Šiauliai, northern Lithuania
- Faith 75: Russian Orthodox Church: Attends the Feast of the Epiphany and Baptism of Christ at the Cathedral of Christ the Saviour, Kropotkinskaya Square, Moscow, Russia, and an ice hole on Zhivopisnaya Street where worshippers swim in the freezing water.
- Faith 76: Atheism in Russia: Attends an Atheist discussion meeting in Moscow.
- Faith 77: Hare Krishna: Witnesses Hare Krishna procession in Moscow.
- Faith 78: Buddhism in Kalmykia: Witnesses Kalmyk Buddhist meditation at the Syakyusn-Syume Temple in Elista, Republic of Kalmykia, Russia. Also visits an apartment built above the temple intended for a visit by the Dalai Lama.
- Faith 79: Benedictine monks: Attends Vespers at San Benedetto's Monastery, Subiaco, Italy.
- Faith 80: Damanhur: Visit to the Damanhur Community, Baldissero Canavese, near Turin, Italy.
