= Mount Colzim =

Mountain in Egypt

Coordinates: 28.9247117°N 32.3483919°E

Mount Colzim (the Inner Mountain of Anthony) is on the west coast of the Gulf of Suez.

Mount Colzim (or Qulzum, Qalzam, or Qolozum), also known as the Inner Mountain of Saint Anthony, is a mountain in Red Sea Governorate, Egypt, which was the final residency of Anthony the Great from about AD 311, when he was 62 years of age, to his death in 356. Currently, the Monastery of Saint Anthony, a Coptic Orthodox monastery, exists in the same location.

== Name ==
The name Colzim is derived from the ancient city of Clysma (Ancient Greek: Κλῦσμα, romanized: Klŷsma, meaning "surf, waves that break"; Coptic: ⲡⲉⲕⲗⲟⲩⲥⲙⲁ, romanized: Peklousma; Arabic: القلزم, romanized: al-Qulzum). Clysma was a major Red Sea port and a center of monasticism. Mount Colzim is called the Inner Mountain of Anthony (also called Qulzum, Qalzam, or Qolozum).

== Location ==
The Inner Mountain is located near the modern Coptic Christian Monastery of Saint Anthony (Dayr Mārī Antonios) in Egypt which was built in the fourth century and which is reputedly Christianity's oldest operating monastery. It is about 160 kilometers southeast of Cairo, in the northern foothills of the Red Sea Mountains.

== History ==
=== Residency of Anthony the Great ===
Since the early days of his monasticism and prior to 311, Anthony lived at what Athanasius of Alexandria called his outer mountain (located at Pispir next to the Nile) for almost twenty years. According to Athanasius' Life of Anthony (Latin: Vita Antonii) written c. 360, Anthony sought to move further out of his desire for solitude.

"But when he saw himself beset by many [people], and not allowed to withdraw himself according to his intent as he wished...he considered and set off to go into the upper Thebaid, among those to whom he was unknown."

By this time, Anthony's fame had grown, causing many monastics to come to him for guidance. Athanasius says that the voice of God (or in Coptic tradition, the voice of a woman by the Nile) told Anthony to move to the inner desert between the Nile and the Red Sea instead of moving to northern Thebaid. Anthony traveled with a group of Saracens for three days along the Wādī al-'Arabah towards the Gulf of Suez.

"...he came to a very lofty mountain, and at the foot of the mountain ran a clear spring, whose waters were sweet and very cold; outside there was a plain and a few neglected palm trees."

Anthony was brought some food and provisions by his disciples, and often left the Inner Mountain to instruct his disciples at Pispir, even notably traveling more than 300 kilometers in old age to the city of Alexandria to voice his opposition to Arianism.

==== Cave of Saint Anthony ====
The cave in which Anthony the Great resided on Mount Colzim is believed to be a certain cave that sits 100 meters above and two kilometers away from the Monastery of Saint Anthony and is a popular site of pilgrimage for Coptic Christians. The presence of multiple monastic cells within the mountain, as well as the large history of monasticism on the mountain, makes it difficult to ascertain which exact cave Anthony lived in. Nevertheless, a spring mentioned in the Life of Anthony is allegedly the same spring that runs near the Deesis Chapel at the Monastery of Saint Anthony. This suggests that the modern-day monastery is more or less the exact location of Anthony's dwelling-place on the Inner Mountain. Anthony lived on the Inner Mountain for forty-three years until his death there in 356. Folklore maintains that he is still buried at the Monastery of Saint Anthony in the chapel of the Creatures of the Apocalypse.

=== Other monastic residencies ===
- Sisoes the Great (died 429) moved from Scetis (where he was under the spiritual guidance of Abba Or) and took up habitation on Anthony's Inner Mountain in his cave in 357, shortly after Anthony's death in 356. Sisoes compared himself to Anthony by saying, "In the cave of a lion, a lowly fox makes its dwelling." Towards the end of his life, Sisoes was asked by a visitor whether he had attained to the stature of Abba Anthony. He replied, "If I had a single one of Abba Anthony’s thoughts, I would be entirely ablaze." Sisoes lived in Anthony's cave for seventy-two years.
- Paul the Simple lived on the Inner Mountain near Anthony until his death.
- When Scetis was destroyed in 395 by the Berbers (Mazices), John the Dwarf relocated to near Mount Colzim and lived only a day's journey from the cave of Anthony. John lived there for the remainder of his life at the same time that Sisoes resided in the cave of Anthony.
- The Australian Coptic Orthodox anchorite Lazarus El Anthony currently lives at Mount Colzim.

== See also ==
- Anthony the Great
- Chronology of early Christian monasticism
