= Lazarus El Anthony =

Orthodox Christian anchorite

Father Lazarus El Anthony
- Born: Tasmania, Australia
- Occupation: Anchorite
- Church: Serbian Orthodox Church (until 1994); Coptic Orthodox Church

Father Lazarus El Anthony (Arabic: لعازر الانطوني; Coptic: ⲗⲁⲍⲁⲣ Ⲁⲛⲧⲱⲛⲓ; Syriac: ܠܥܙܪ ܐܢܛܘܢܝܣ) is an Australian-Egyptian Coptic Orthodox Christian contemplative monk and hermit. He has appeared in various documentaries, most notably the BBC series Extreme Pilgrim.

Fr. Lazarus has been the primary subject of two documentary films, The Last Anchorite, which took Best Documentary Transmitter Award winner at the Crystal Palace International Film Festival 2010, and Desert Foreigners, released in 2018. In addition, there are numerous short videos arranged in several series of videos on the Coptic Youth Channel on YouTube.

== Biography ==
Lazarus El Anthony was born into a Protestant Christian family in Tasmania, Australia, where he attended Methodist and Roman Catholic church services as a child. He became an atheist when he was a teenager. He taught philosophy at a university in Tasmania. He was married to Ruby and held a teaching position at Ballarat University in the late eighties. After his mother died he had a personal crisis, left his wife and became a monk at the St. Sava Serbian Orthodox Monastery near Geelong in Australia, and then at Mount Athos in Greece. After he met Pope Shenouda III, Lazarus El Anthony moved to Egypt to become a hermit on Mount Colzim near the Monastery of Saint Anthony in Red Sea Governorate, eastern Egypt. He currently lives an ascetic life there, in the footsteps of Saint Anthony the Great and the other Desert Fathers.

== Media ==
Lazarus El Anthony has been extensively interviewed on the Coptic Youth Channel. He has also been featured in a full-length episode of the BBC's Extreme Pilgrim, and in The Last Anchorite, a documentary film by filmmaker Remigiusz Sowa. Another documentary film about Lazarus El Anthony is Desert Foreigners.

== See also ==
- Desert Fathers
