= Arapixi Extractive Reserve =

- Reserva Extrativista Arapixi
- IUCN category VI (protected area with sustainable use of natural resources)
- Location within Brazil
- Nearest city: Boca do Acre, Amazonas
- Coordinates: 8.853°S 67.864°W
- Area: 133,637 hectares (330,220 acres)
- Designation: Extractive reserve
- Created: 21 June 2006
- Administrator: Chico Mendes Institute for Biodiversity Conservation

The Arapixi Extractive Reserve (Portuguese: Reserva Extrativista Arapixi) is an extractive reserve in the state of Amazonas, Brazil.

== Location ==
The Arapixi Extractive Reserve is in the municipality of Boca do Acre, Amazonas. It has an area of 133,637 hectares (330,220 acres). The Purus River runs through the reserve from west to east. The reserve adjoins the Igarapé Capanã Indigenous Reserve to the west, the Mapiá-Inauini National Forest to the north and the Camicuã Indigenous Territory to the east. About 300 families make use of the reserve. The main economic activities are collection of latex from rubber trees and gathering of Brazil nuts. The families also produce brown sugar, tobacco, flour, bananas, watermelons and beans.

== Environment ==
The reserve has fairly flat terrain, and lies in the basin of the meandering Purus River. The region has high temperature and high rainfall. The main types of vegetation are open alluvial rainforest, open lowland rainforest, dense alluvial rainforest and dense lowland rainforest. There are small areas that have been converted for use in agriculture or cattle grazing, and areas with secondary vegetation in various stages of regeneration.

A survey of the reserve identified 25 species of fish, seven species of reptiles, 123 species of birds and 33 species of mammals. The rough survey found the endangered jaguar (Panthera onca), giant armadillo (Priodontes maximus), giant anteater (Myrmecophaga tridactyla) and giant otter (Pteronura brasiliensis). Fish that are over-exploited or threatened by over-exploitation are Colossoma macropomum, Arapaima gigas, Brachyplatystoma vaillantii and Brachyplatystoma filamentosum.

Amazon birds with restricted distribution are speckled chachalaca (Ortalis guttata), pale-winged trumpeter (Psophia leucoptera), dusky-headed parakeet (Aratinga weddellii), cobalt-winged parakeet (Brotogeris cyanoptera), tui parakeet (Brotogeris sanctithomae), festive amazon (Amazona festiva), Purus jacamar (Galbacyrhynchus purusianus), semicollared puffbird (Malacoptila semicincta) and lemon-throated barbet (Eubucco richardsoni).

== History ==
The local communities began to fight for creation of the reserve in 2000. The Arapixi Extractive Reserve was created by federal decree on 21 June 2006. It was created in response to a request from the Union of Rural Workers of Boca do Acre, supported by the National Council of Rubber Tappers and the Amazon Workers Group. Their expectation was that it would prevent the advance of soybean farming and cattle ranching into the territory, which would devastate the livelihoods of the residents. The reserve is classed as IUCN protected area category VI (protected area with sustainable use of natural resources). Its basic objectives protect the livelihoods and culture of the traditional extractive population, and to ensure the sustainable use of natural resources of the unit.

On 13 December 2006 administrative responsibility was transferred to the Acre office of IBAMA, due to its proximity compared to the Amazonas office. On 27 December 2006 the Instituto Nacional de Colonização e Reforma Agrária (INCRA) recognised the reserve as meeting the needs of 150 families of small rural producers, who would qualify for PRONAF support. This was adjusted to 200 families on 18 December 2009. The deliberative council was created on 12 August 2009. The management plan was approved on 27 August 2010. The reserve is now administered by the Chico Mendes Institute for Biodiversity Conservation (ICMBio).

== Sources ==
- Resex Arapixi (in Portuguese), ICMBio: Chico Mendes Institute for Biodiversity Conservation
- RESEX Arapixi (in Portuguese), ISA: Instituto Socioambiental
- Unidade de Conservação: Reserva Extrativista Arapixi, MMA: Ministério do Meio Ambiente
