= Catauxi =

Tribe of South American Indians of Brazil

The Catauxi are a tribe of Indigenous South Americans of the Purus River district, Brazil. According to Kroemer (1985 p. 80), the most numerous nations of the Ituxi River were the Cacharari, Canamari, Guarayo, Apurinã, Huatanari, Paumari, Catauxi, and Juma.

The Catauxi were a warlike race, with remarkably clear complexions and handsome features; round wrists and ankles they wear rings of twisted hair. They cultivated mandioc, and made pottery and bark canoes.
