= Extreme Pilgrim =

- Genre: Religious television program
- Directed by: Graham Johnston
- Presented by: Pete Owen-Jones
- Composer: Paul Pritchard
- Country of origin: United Kingdom
- Original language: English
- No. of series: 1
- No. of episodes: 3

Production
- Executive producer: Jean-Claude Bragard
- Producer: Graham Johnston
- Editor: Steve Stevenson
- Camera setup: Graham Johnston
- Running time: 60 minutes
- Production company: BBC Television

Original release
- Network: BBC Two
- Release: 4 January – 18 January 2008

Related
- The Lost Gospels; Around the World in 80 Faiths

Extreme Pilgrim is a British television series, first broadcast by the BBC in January 2008. The series is presented by the Anglican vicar, Pete Owen-Jones, who researches and attempts to practice a variety of the world's methods of enlightenment and spirituality, which he opines has been lost by those in the West.

== Episode list ==
The series was presented in three episodes:

=== Episode One: "China: the Mountain" ===
The first episode in the series sees Peter travelling to the Shaolin Monastery of Henan Province, central China. The Shaolin Monastery, the ancestral home of all martial arts, and considered to be the most physically demanding phase of Peter's search as he looks into the teachings of the Indian Buddhist, Bodhidharma.

Once there, he is introduced to meditation and follows a "punishing" regime of physical exercise. After becoming disenchanted with what he sees as a "branding" of life at the monastery and an inability to achieve the levels of meditation required, he travels to a mountain temple located in Sangwan. After some time, he manages to feel the stillness of mind he requires through breathing and movement and concludes that he has attained a level of Zen.

=== Episode Two: "India: the River" ===
The second episode is located in Allahabad, India and follows Peter's time with the wandering Sadhu holy men who see themselves as mediums between the Gods and humanity. Whilst there, Peter looks into the Hindu pilgrimage named the Kumbh Mela, which draws people from all over India to the River Ganges.

Once there, Peter attempts to search out a guru who will show the way of the Sadhus. After the festival, Peter travels to Haridwar to learn more about the Hindu faith and its gods. From there, he travels north and into the foothills of the Himalayas to a village where he is to live on the outskirts of a cave to seek solitude.

=== Episode Three: "Egypt: the Desert" ===
The third and final episode is set in Egypt and looks to gain insight into the teachings of St Anthony of the Desert, the Desert Fathers, and the Hermit lifestyle. He visits Coma, the birthplace of Anthony, and the church where he spent 20 years in relative solitude. From there he travels into the desert with a group of Bedouin camel herders to trace Anthony's steps to the site where he established the Monastery of Saint Anthony.

After a stay with the Coptic monks at the monastery, Peter goes into one of the hermit caves where St Anthony spent his final 43 years. Under the stewardship of an Australian Coptic hermit, Father Lazarus El Anthony, he is introduced into one of the caves and goes on to spend 21 days there in solitude.
