= Anna Ferrer =

British aid worker

Anna Ferrer (maiden name Essex) is the president of the Vicente Ferrer Foundation (FVF) and executive director of the FVF in India. FVF has helped 3.5 million Indians out of poverty, focusing on women.

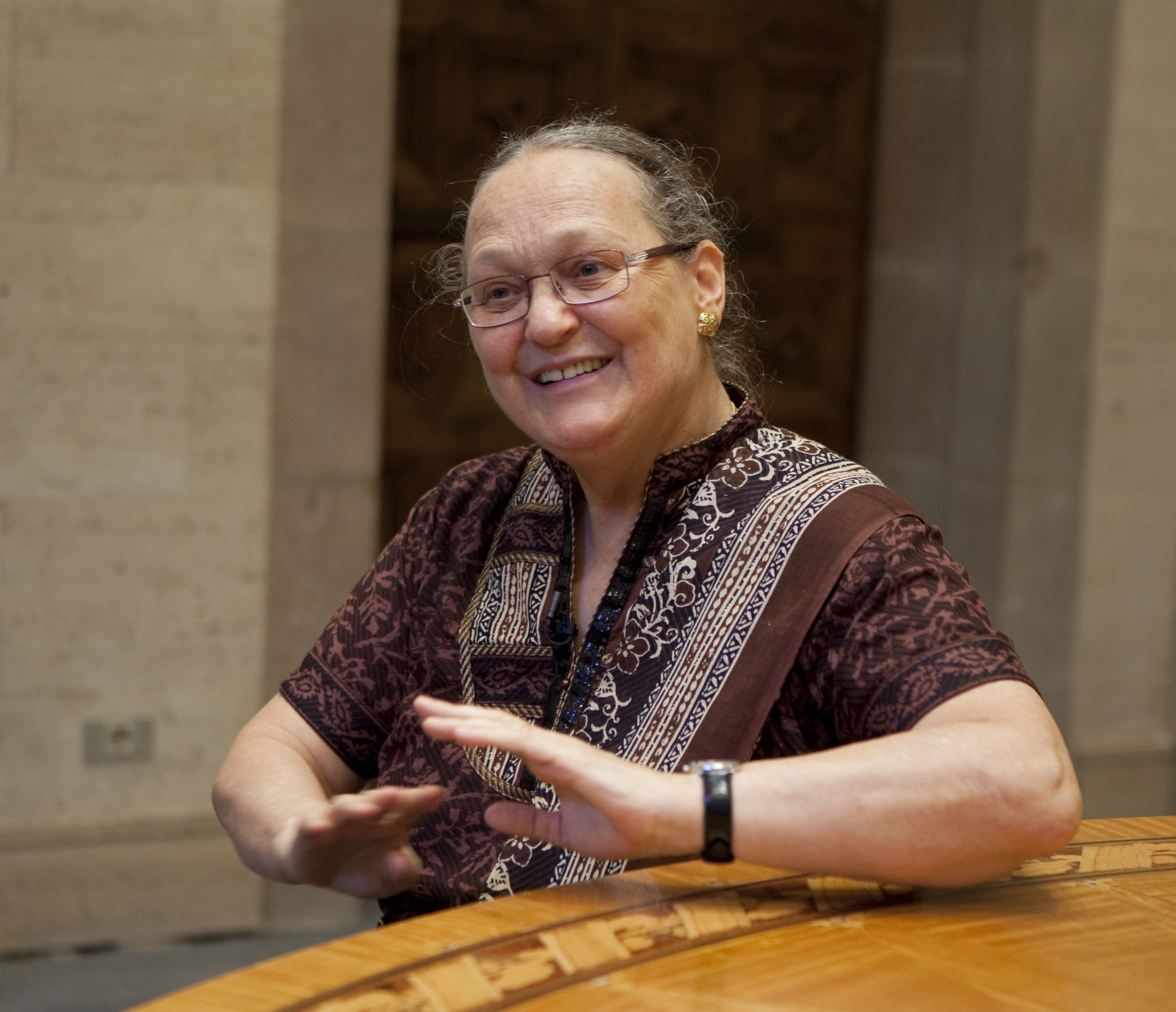
Anna Ferrer in Barcelona (Spain)

She was born in Britain on April 10, 1947. She moved to India in the 1960s where she became a reporter for the Current weekly. While working for the paper, she interviewed the civil rights leader Vicente Ferrer Moncho and eventually joined the Citizens for Justice Committee which he started. They married in April 1970 and had three children, Tara, Moncho and Yamuna. Together, in 1969, they started the Vincent Ferrer Foundation. She and her husband worked together, building and developing the organization until his death ten years ago, when she took over. She works to improve the situation of Indian women and to help them to achieve positions of responsibility.

== Awards and honors ==
- Encomienda of the Number of the Order of Civil Merit, in New Delhi
- The First Prize for the "Commitment to Health" of the Bizkaia Medical College.
- Gaudí Award -Gresol to Notoriety and Excellence in the category of Social Work.
- Hamsa Prize (2015).
- Robert Burns Humanitatian Award (2018).
- Ignacio Ellacuria Prize (2019)
