= John the Dwarf =

Egyptian Desert Father

Saint John the Dwarf
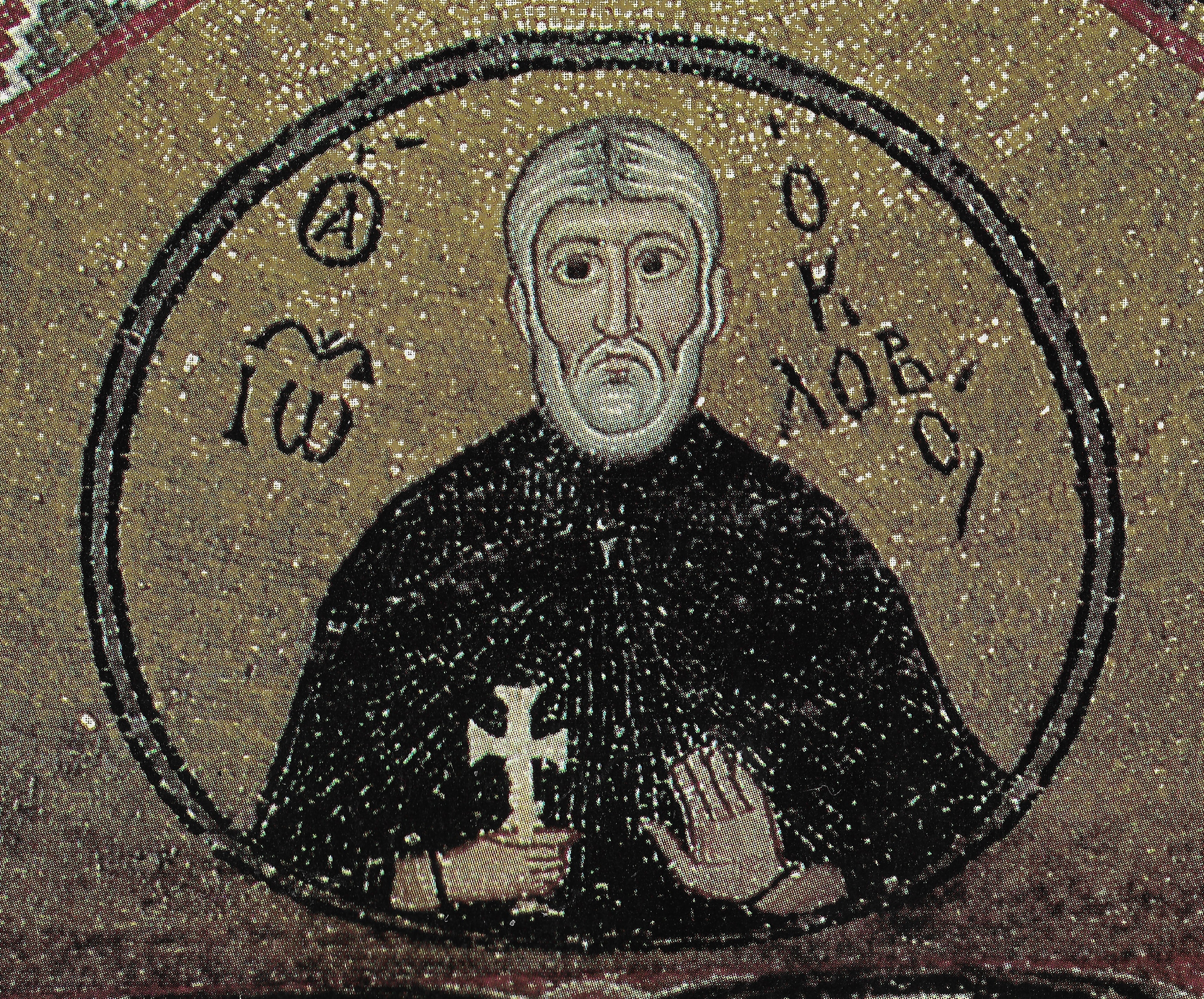
- Mosaic in Hosios Loukas
- Born: c. 339; Thebes, Egypt
- Died: c. 405; Mount Colzim, Egypt
- Venerated in: Roman Catholic Church; Eastern Orthodox Church; Oriental Orthodox Churches
- Feast: Paopi 20 (Coptic Christianity) (i.e. October 17 Julian Calendar); October 17 (Roman Catholic); November 9 (Eastern Orthodox Church)
- Attributes: Short Monk watering a stick
- Patronage: People with Dwarfism

John the Dwarf (Greek: Ἰωάννης Κολοβός; Arabic: يوحنا القزم Yuḥanna al-Qazim; c. 339 – c. 405), also called John Colobus, John Kolobos or Abba John the Dwarf, was a Coptic Desert Father of the early Christian church.

== Life ==
John the Dwarf was born in the town of Thebes in Egypt to poor Christian parents. At the age of eighteen, he and an elder brother, moved to the desert of Scetes where he became a disciple of Pambo and a good friend of Pishoy. He lived a life of austerity and taught several other monks his way of life, among them was Arsenius the Great.

After the departure of Pambo, John was ordained a priest by Pope Theophilus and became abbot of the monastery he founded around the Tree of Obedience. When the Mazices invaded Scetes in 395, John fled the Nitrian Desert and went to live on Mount Colzim, near the present city of Suez, where he died.

In 515, the relics of John the Dwarf were moved to the Nitrian Desert. His feast is celebrated on October 17 in the Roman Catholic Church, on 20 Paopi at the Coptic Orthodox Church and on November 9 in the Eastern Orthodox Church. The Monastery of Saint John the Dwarf in Scetes is now recognized by the Coptic orthodox church.

John lived on only flatbread and vegetables his entire life and could eat one meal a day.

== Legend ==
John the Dwarf is best known for his obedience. The most famous story about his obedience is that one day Pambo gave John a piece of dry wood and ordered him to plant and water it. John obeyed and went on watering it twice a day even though the water was about 12 miles from where they lived. After three years, the piece of wood sprouted and grew into a fruitful tree. Pambo took some of this tree's fruits and went around to all the elder monks, saying "take, eat from the fruit of obedience". Postumian, who was in Egypt in 402, says he was shown this tree which grew in the yard of the monastery and which he saw covered with shoots and green leaves.

Ababius, a monk of Scetes and a saint of the Coptic Church, is the subject of a long biography attributed in manuscript form to John the Dwarf.

== Sources ==
- Saint John the Dwarf
- Orthodox Church of America, Feasts and Saints
- Atiya, Aziz S. The Coptic Encyclopedia. New York: Macmillan Publishing Co., 1991. ISBN 0-02-897025-X
