= São Vicente Ferrer, Maranhão =

São Vicente Ferrer
- Municipality
- Flag

- Location in Maranhão state

- Location in Brazil
- Coordinates: 02°24′32″S 44°24′54″W
- Country: Brazil
- Region: Northeast
- State: Maranhão

Area
  - Total: 390 km^{2} (150 sq mi)

Population (2020)
  - Total: 22,350
  - Density: 57/km^{2} (150/sq mi)
- Time zone: UTC−3 (BRT)

São Vicente Ferrer is a Brazilian municipality in the state of Maranhão. The estimated population is 22,350 (2020) and the total area is 390 km^{2}.

== Location ==
The municipality has an average elevation of 16m above sea level. The municipality contains a small part of the Baixada Maranhense Environmental Protection Area, a 1,775,035.6-hectare (4,386,208-acre) sustainable use conservation unit created in 1991 that has been a Ramsar Site since 2000.

== Important People ==
On December 15, 1890, São Vicente Ferrer became the birthplace of Mestre Raimundo Irineu Serra, founder of the Santo Daime religion. Born to Sanches Serra and Joana Assunção, the young Irineu stayed in São Vicente Ferrer until he left for the Amazon at age 20 in 1910. His nephew, Daniel Serra, returned with his family to live in São Vicente Ferrer in 2006; formally inaugurating the Santo Daime center "Estrela Brilhante" (Bright Star), on March 22, 2010.
