= Vicente Ferrer Roselló =

Spanish politician

Senator of Spain
- In office 1995–2003

Member of the Congress of Deputies
- Incumbent
- Assumed office 2008

Personal details
- Born: 9 July 1959 (age 66); Valencia, Spain

Vicente Ferrer Roselló (Spanish pronunciation: [/viˈθente feˈreɾ roseˈʎo/]; born 9 July 1959) is a Spanish politician who belongs to the People's Party (PP).

Divorced with four children, he practised as a lawyer. He entered politics in 1995 when he was designated by the Valencian Community as senator for Valencia province. He continued in that role until 2003. In 2008 he was elected to the Spanish Congress of Deputies representing Valencia region. He was the eighth placed candidate on the PP list for that election, in a district where the PP had won eight seats at the election, making his seat vulnerable. However at the 2008 election, the PP won nine seats.
