= Peter Owen-Jones =

English Anglican priest

The Reverend Peter Owen-Jones
- Born: 1957 (age 68–69); London, England
- Spouse: Jac Owen-Jones (separated)
- Children: 4
- Church: Church of England
- Ordained: 1993
- Congregations served: Firle, Sussex
- Offices held: Subdean, rector

Peter Owen-Jones (born 1957) is an English Anglican priest, author and television presenter.

== Biography and career ==
Owen-Jones dropped out of public school at the age of 16, and moved to Australia, where he worked as a farm hand. He moved back to Britain, and worked as a farm labourer in southeast England, then ran a mobile disco, before moving to London where he started work in advertising, as a messenger boy, eventually working his way up to the position of creative director.

In his late 20s, with a wife and two children, he gave up his commercial life to follow a calling to the Anglican ordained ministry by enrolling at Ridley Hall, Cambridge. In early 1996, he gained notoriety when he conducted a service for the Newbury bypass protestors.

In 1998, he was responsible for three parishes in Cambridgeshire as the rector of Haslingfield (Harlton, Great Eversden and Little Eversden), before resigning from this position in 2005 to relocate to the benefice of Glynde, Firle and Beddingham. After a brief appearance in the 2003 documentary series The Power and the Glory, he was recruited by the BBC to front a series of religious television programmes looking at different aspects of Christianity and other faiths.

He was married to Jacs Owen-Jones, with whom he has four children, but they have divorced.

In his BBC documentary How to Live a Simple Life (2009), Owen-Jones tried to live a life without money in the footsteps of Saint Francis of Assisi. In the same year, he travelled the world in Around the World in 80 Faiths, visiting practitioners of various religions. His 2006 documentary The Lost Gospels discussed the Apocryphal Gospels which were omitted from the canon of the New Testament. He considered how their contents might have altered Christian theology if they had not been suppressed.

== Books ==
- Bed of Nails: An Advertising Executive's Journey Through Theological College, Lion Hudson, 1998, ISBN 978-0-7459-3628-4
- Small Boat, Big Sea: One Year's Journey as a Parish Priest, Lion Publishing, 2000, ISBN 0-7459-5053-1
- Psalm, O Books, 2005, ISBN 1-903816-91-2
- Letters from an Extreme Pilgrim: Reflections on Life, Love and the Soul, Rider Books, 2010, ISBN 978-1-84604-133-4
- Pathlands: 21 Tranquil Walks Among the Villages of Britain, Rider Books, 2015, ISBN 978-1-84604-443-4
- “Everest England: 29,000 Feet in 12 Days”, AA Publishing, 2019, ISBN 978-07495-7923-4

== Audio ==
- Psalm, spoken word/electronica project

== Filmography ==
- The Power and the Glory (2003), BBC Four
- The Battle for Britain's Soul (2004), BBC Two, a history of Christianity in Britain
- The Lost Gospels (2008), BBC Four, a documentary on the ancient gospels
- Extreme Pilgrim (2008), BBC Two, in which he lived as a Chinese Buddhist monk, a Christian monk and an Indian ascetic
- In Search of England's Green and Pleasant Land (2009): Episode: South, BBC South
- Around the World in 80 Faiths (2009), BBC Two, a travel documentary encountering different religions
- How to Live a Simple Life (2010), BBC Two, a three-part series in which he tries to turn his back on consumerism
- South Downs: England's Mountains Green (2017), BBC Four, looking at the history and culture of the South Downs National Park
- New Forest: A Year in the Wild Wood (2019), BBC Four, looking at the history and culture of the New Forest National Park
