= Purus National Forest =

Brazilian national forest

- Floresta Nacional do Purus
- IUCN category VI (protected area with sustainable use of natural resources)
- Location within Brazil
- Nearest city: Pauini, Amazonas
- Coordinates: 8°16′08″S 67°40′19″W
- Area: 256,000 hectares (630,000 acres)
- Designation: National forest
- Created: 21 June 1988

The Purus National Forest (Portuguese: Floresta Nacional do Purus) is a national forest in the state of Amazonas, Brazil. It surrounds the shamanic-Christian community of Céu do Mapiá.

== Location ==
The Purus National Forest, covering 256,000 hectares (630,000)

[1]  is in the municipality of Pauini, Amazonas.It lies on the left (west) bank of the Purus River, downstream from Boca do Acre.

The Inauini/Teuini Indigenous Territory to the north partly overlaps the national forest. It is bounded to the west by the Mapiá-Inauini National Forest. To the south it adjoins the Camicuã Indigeous Territory.

It takes at least six hours to cover the 200 kilometres (120 mi) road from Rio Branco to Boca do Acre, and the same length of time by boat on the Purus River and then the Mapia stream to reach the central village of Céu do Mapiá. This community in the forest is devoted to consecration of the shamanic-Christian syncretism of Santo Daime. During the dry season access is limited to the Purus River.

== Environment ==
Average temperatures range from 22 to 26 °C (72 to 79 °F). Rainfall is from 1,750 to 2,250 millimetres (69 to 89 in) annually. Rain mostly falls in the months of October to April, while the driest season is from June to August. The topography is a plateau with hills and flat areas dissected by deep valleys. The alluvial areas that are flooded by the Purus River are relatively fertile due to sediments from the Andes. However, most of the soils are very poor and acidic.

The vegetation is entirely dense rainforest. In the higher terra firma areas and the valley slopes the canopy reaches 50 metres (160 ft). The main tree species are Dinizia excelsa, Manilkara huberi, Anacardium species, Parkia pendula and Bertholletia excelsa. In the várzea forest along the Mapiá stream (Igarapé Mapiá) the canopy is typically 20 to 30 metres (66 to 98 ft) high. The Mapiá is densely occupied, with many areas of deforestation along its course. In general the area beyond the village of Céu do Mapiá and the Teuini stream is well-preserved.

== History ==
The Purus National Forest was created by federal decree 96.190 of 21 June 1988, with an estimated area of 256,000 hectares (630,000 acres). It is administered by the Chico Mendes Institute for Biodiversity Conservation (ICMBio). The forest is classed as IUCN protected area category VI (protected area with sustainable use of natural resources). The purpose is sustainable multiple use of forest resources, and scientific research with emphasis on methods for sustainable exploitation of native forests.

On 26 September 2005 the Instituto Nacional de Colonização e Reforma Agrária (INCRA – National Institute for Colonization and Agrarian Reform) recognised the forest as supporting 200 families of small producers, who would qualify for PRONAF support. This was amended to 300 families on 31 December 2008. The management plan was approved on 18 March 2009. The consultative council was created on 10 March 2010.

== Economy ==
In July 2007 the Residents Association of Céu do Mapiá Village (Associação de Moradores da Vila Céu do Mapiá - AMVCM) began to implement community forest management in the village's zone of community use in partnership with the Brazilian Institute of Environment and Renewable Natural Resources, the Federal University of Viçosa and the Rio de Janeiro Botanical Garden. The plan is to produce sufficient quantities of wood to meet community demand.

As of 2010 the community was engaged in subsistence farming and raising small animals. There were 600 residents. The community has an area of 1,400 hectares (3,500 acres) for forest management, and plan to use 100 hectares (250 acres) per year for logging. The community zone of use is 66,000 hectares (160,000 acres), of which potentially 20,000 hectares (49,000 acres) could be used for forest management. On 19 October 2011 a working group was constituted to discuss and evaluate forms of occupation, population growth and migration in the village of Céu do Mapiá.

== Sources ==
- "A Floresta Nacional Purus", santodaime.org (in Portuguese)
- Brandão, Pedro Christo; Soares, Vicente Paulo; Bello Simas, Felipe Nogueira; Schaefer, Carlos Ernesto Gonçalves Reynaud; Lopes de Souza, Agostinho; Furtado de Mendonça, Bruno Araujo (January–February 2010), "Caracterização de geoambientes da floresta nacional do purus, Amazônia ocidental: uma contribuição ao plano de manejo" (PDF), Revista Árvore, 34 (1), Viçosa: 115–126, doi:10.1590/S0100-67622010000100013, ISSN 1806-9088
- Flona do Purus (in Portuguese), ICMBio: Chico Mendes Institute for Biodiversity Conservation
- FLONA do Purus (in Portuguese), ISA: Instituto Socioambiental
- Serviço Florestal capacita comunitários da Flona do Purus em manejo sustentável, 3 March 2010
- Unidade de Conservação: Floresta Nacional de Purus (in Portuguese), MMA: Ministério do Meio Ambiente
