= Mestre Irineu =

Founder of Daime (1892–1971)

Raimundo Irineu Serra, also known as Mestre (Master) Irineu, (December 15, 1892 São Vicente Ferrer, Maranhão, Brazil - July 6, 1971) was the founder of a syncretic religion known as Santo Daime. Irineu was raised Roman Catholic. He later moved to the state of Acre where he worked on rubber plantations. In the city of Brasiléia, which is close to the border of Bolivia, he was in contact with other people from his home state of Maranhão as well as Bolivians, from whom he learned the use of ayahuasca. In these early experiences he allegedly encountered the Virgin Mary (the Queen of the Forest) and began receiving the guidance which developed into a religious doctrine throughout the remainder of his long life. Santo Daime teachings emphasize hymns and calls that guide participants during the sacramental drink's communion, aiding in self-awareness and individual character refinement across social, emotional, and spiritual spheres. The practice is predominantly Christian and includes deities specific to the Queen of the Forest's battalion, with prominent figures like the Caboclos of Tucum, and revolves around central deities represented by Jesus Christ, Our Lady of Conception, Patriarch Saint Joseph, and Saint John the Baptist.

== Biography ==
Mestre Irineu, the son of the former slave Sancho Martino and Joana Assunção, arrived in the state of Acre in 1912 at the age of nineteen. As a tall Afro-Brazilian, he joined the migration movement related to latex extraction in rubber plantations. In 1912, he moved to Manaus, residing at the Porto de Xapuri for two years. He then worked in the rubber plantations of Brasiléia for three years and later in Sena Madureira for another three years. Returning to Rio Branco, Acre, Mestre Irineu served in the territorial Guard, rising to the rank of Corporal. He then passed an examination to join the Commission of Limits, a federal entity tasked with defining borders between Acre, Bolivia, and Peru. This commission was led by Marshal Rondon, who appointed Irineu as the Treasurer of the Troop, a position of trust. Later, Mestre Irineu returned to the forest and the rubber plantations, where he met and befriended Antonio Costa.

== The Daime Doctrine ==
Irineu claimed to have had an experience that was a divine revelation from the Virgin Mary, who appeared as the Queen of the Forest. Irineu was tasked with founding a spiritual doctrine, a syncretism based on the consecration of a drink consumed for thousands of years, set within Christian culture and symbolism, while simultaneously incorporating Indigenous, Brazilian, African, and Eastern transcendental wisdom. In 1930, he established a community center where he initiated the Santo Daime church. Consequently, Mestre Irineu and his doctrine faced prejudice and persecution due to the predominance of Afro-descendants among his followers and the fear held by the elites of the time towards movements of Afro-Indigenous origin, such as Santo Daime.

In 1945, Mestre Irineu's companions acquired land and established a community named Alto Santo. Irineu began to channel messages from the spiritual dimension in the form of simple hymns, which became the guiding principle of the doctrine.

== Mestre Império ==
The Daime church revolved around Mestre Irineu. By his death in 1971, he was already known as Mestre Império. After Irineu's passing, some of his disciples decided to expand the doctrine. Due to disagreements, a group of daimistas, including Sebastião Mota de Melo and Francisco Fernando Filho, decided to establish their own churches, which became independent from Alto Santo.

There is a popular belief in the Doctrine that Mestre Irineu would be Jesus, but, despite that, he confirmed many times that he, indeed, was not Jesus Christ. In fact, many hymns confirm that he isn't Jesus. The 20th hymn of the hymnbook "Sois Baliza" says: "Jesus Christ is the one who commands us / Jesus Christ is the one who gives to us / He sent our master / Here to teach us"; the next hymn says: "Our mother, along with Jesus Christ, / Gave him the command / To fulfill this mission / As master teacher". The hymnbook "O Amor Divino" also denies explicitly this belief. Its 14th hymn says: "Jesus Christ the Redeemer / Is the owner of these teachings / He sent our master / To follow his destiny". Even more explicitly, the two figures are differentiated in its 30th hymn: "We all must have / This consecration / That he went to his throne / And left the master to carry his mission // Jesus Christ came to the World / Ended what he came to do / Then gave to our master / He has this same power".
