= Pauini =

Municipality of Amazonas, Brazil

- Municipality
- Location of the municipality inside Amazonas
- Coordinates: 7°42′50″S 66°58′33″W
- Country: Brazil
- Region: North
- State: Amazonas

Area
  - Total: 43,263 km^{2} (16,704 sq mi)

Population (2020)
  - Total: 19,522
  - Density: 0.45124/km^{2} (1.1687/sq mi)
- Time zone: UTC−4 (AMT)

Pauini is a municipality located in the Brazilian state of Amazonas.

The population of Pauini was 19,522 in 2020. Its area is 43,263 square kilometres (16,704 sq mi). The municipality contains the 256,000-hectare (630,000-acre) Purus National Forest, created in 1988. It holds 8% of the 311,000-hectare (770,000-acre) Mapiá-Inauini National Forest, created in 1989. It also contains 8% of the 604,209-hectare (1,493,030-acre) Médio Purus Extractive Reserve, created in 2008.
