= Santo Daime =

New religious movement

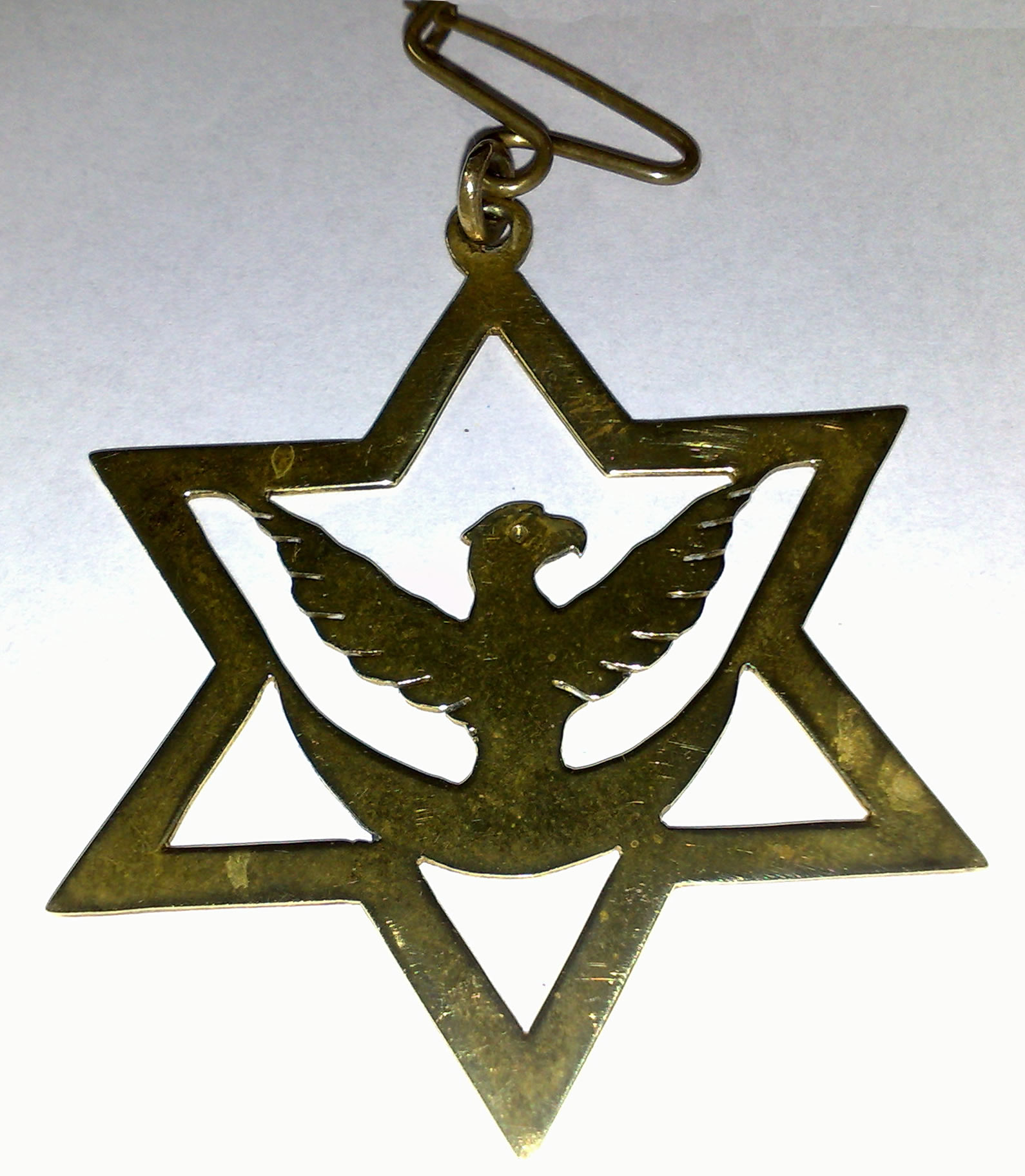
Six-pointed star with eagle and crescent, a common Santo Daime symbol worn by members of the religion

Santo Daime ([ˈsɐ̃tu ˈdajmi]) is a universalistic/syncretic religion founded in the 1930s in the Brazilian Amazonian state of Acre based on the teachings of Raimundo Irineu Serra, known as Mestre Irineu. Santo Daime incorporates elements of several religious or spiritual traditions, mainly folk Catholicism, Kardecist Spiritism, African animism and indigenous South American shamanism, including vegetalismo.

Ceremonies — trabalhos (Portuguese for "works") — are typically several hours long, sung collectively, and are undertaken sitting in silent "concentration" or dancing according to simple steps in geometrical formation. Ayahuasca, referred to as Daime within the practice, which contains several psychoactive compounds, is consumed as a sacrament as part of the ceremony.

Santo Daime churches promote a wholesome lifestyle in conformity with Irineu's motto of "harmony, love, truth and justice", as well as other key doctrinal values such as strength, humility, fraternity and purity of heart. The practice became a worldwide movement in the 1990s.

== History ==
Santo Daime, sometimes called simply, the 'Doctrine of Mestre Irineu', is the name given to the religious practice originally begun in the 1920s in the far western Brazilian state (then territory) of Acre by Raimundo Irineu Serra, a migrant from Maranhão in Brazil's northeast region, and grandson of slaves.

Irineu Serra was born in Brazil in 1892 to African parents and migrated to the Western Amazon region in 1912, attracted by a boom in the rubber tapping industry. He first drank ayahuasca in the border region between Brazil, Bolivia, and Peru. As a result of experiencing a series of visions whilst spending eight days in solitude in the forest, he began to conduct spiritual ceremonies using ayahuasca. Many people came to him sick, seeking healing they could not afford or failed to find in standard medical practice.

Originally, Santo Daime teachings had no basis in written text, as early practitioners were illiterate, learning being experiential, through singing of inspired hymns praising the perennial values of love, harmony, truth, and justice through poetic and metaphorical imagery. The hinários (hymnals) of early practitioners have since become the sacred works of the doctrine. The earliest hymns were received by Mestre Irineu in the 1930s, eventually growing to a collection or hinário of about 130 hymns, titled O Cruzeiro ("The Cross"). The last hymns Irineu received in the late 1960s are considered especially important.

== Ritual ==
Devotional in context, the hymns praise divine principles. The Cross of Caravaca (named after Caravaca, Spain, where the style originated), with its double horizontal beam, stands on the altar, next to a vase of flowers. Each trabalho begins and ends with Christian prayers, including the Lord's Prayer and Hail Mary. Santo Daime practice features several kinds of rituals which can be distinguished by the different selections of hymns that are sung, the uniforms worn by initiates (farda azul versus farda branca), the spiritual purpose (including but not limited to: healing, concentration, memorial, prayer, and/or celebration), and whether the ceremony is performed seated or dancing.

Participants drink Daime at regular intervals in all types of "works" ("trabalhos"); but the format and focus will differ. For example, the work of concentration ("concentração"), includes periods of silent, seated meditations, between 1 and 2 hours in length, in between the sung hymn selections.

Festival works, commonly or colloquially known as "hinários" or "hinário works", are generally much longer in length than concentrations or healing works (trabalhos de cura) and involve dancing and singing hymns in the farda branca, or white uniform for initiates, while playing maracás. The festival works occur on specific calendar dates and saints' days (i.e. Christmas, St. John's Day, Mother's Day, the birthday of Mestre Irineu, New Year's Eve, Three Kings' Day/Epiphany, etc), and the entire hinário (not just a selection) is sung, from the beginning to the end. These "festival" works involve singing of the hinários of founding and senior members of the church and each of these works coincides with official dates on the Santo Daime calendar. For example, on Christmas Eve, Mestre Irineu's entire hinário, O Cruzeiro, is sung.

The Christian core of the doctrine is combined with other elements, drawing on other spiritual strands of Brazilian culture: there is an emphasis on personal responsibility within a fellowship, the need to walk on the path of love leaving behind old habits and evil (with divine help), to examine one's conscience carefully, to call on God and the Virgin Mother and Jesus Christ for help, to do good, to be just, to pray regularly; but also an animist appreciation of the enchantment of nature, such as the Sun, Moon and Stars, the oneness of life, as well as the totemic symbol of the beija-flor (hummingbird). Spiritual beings from indigenous Amazonian shamanism and deities from the Afro-Brazilian pantheon, such as Ogum and Iemanjá, are also respected and incorporated into the doctrine. The nature of the work is sometimes personified and addressed as Juramidam, a name disclosed to Irineu in his visionary experience, which means literally, "God (jura) and his soldiers (midam)". Metaphorically, the mystic body of the church during hymns is often referred to as the "Empire of Juramidam."

Ayahuasca, consumed sacramentally by Daimistas in Eucharistic ceremonies, has many different traditional names, but is known within the Santo Daime religion as Santo Daime, or simply Daime, as originally named by Mestre Irineu. Dai-me (with a hyphen) means "give me" in Portuguese. A phrase, Dai-me força, dai-me amor ("give me strength, give me love"), recurs throughout the hymns of the doctrine. "Daime" is revered as an entheogenic sacrament, not as any kind of recreational drug; in fact, there are many testimonies of it curing drug addictions and alcoholism.

Participants in the ritual come to submit themselves to a process through which they may learn self-knowledge, to be more humble, have their hearts opened up, and experience the Grace of God. This may include various wonders — ayahuasca is known for the visions or "mirações" it generates, and the sense of communion with nature and spiritual reality — as well as more mundane, less pleasant lessons about the self. The Daime is thought to reveal both positive and various negative or unresolved aspects of the individual, resulting in difficult "passages" involving the integration of this dissociated psychological content. This often will be end-pointed by the purgative nature of Ayahuasca, whereby negative emotions, sinful elements from within, and even demonic energies are expelled, as well as physical toxins. This leads to a general release, a sense of joy, lightness, and clarity afterwards, with a general improvement in life. The only real dangers to be experienced during ceremonies are exposure of egotistical tendencies and contrition.

Ceremonies are referred to as "works" or "trabalhos" because hard work is needed on the spiritual path, laziness being an impediment on the path of the soul. The effects of Daime combined with dancing, singing, and concentration for up to twelve hours require and develop stamina/determination firmeza (firmness). The Daime will often give energy to people to help them through a long challenging work, with added help coming from a sense of fraternity and shared purpose, as per the doctrine.

== Santo Daime hymns ==
The teachings of Santo Daime are transmitted through its hymns, which, when sung, are intended to facilitate a first-hand experience of the divine. Musical accompaniment often includes the unison rhythmic playing of maracás, in strict 4:4, 3:4 or 6:4 time, along with typical folk instruments such as the guitar, accordion, and flute. The rhythms are "Marcha" (4:4), "Valsa" (3:4), "Mazurca" (6:4), "Marcha e Meia-Valsa" (4:4), "À Capela" (0:0) and some more uncommon like "Valsa e Meia-Valsa" (alternates between 3:4 and 4:4) and songs that change rhythm from À Capela to Marcha. Mestre Irineu's hinário contains 133 hymns (3 of which have not been published) and chronicles his spiritual journey and evolution from when he began drinking the Daime until his death in 1971. Through the singing of his hinário, the participant can connect with the spirit, teachings, and experiences of Mestre Irineu and, in many ways, can begin walking the same spiritual path.

A significant proportion of members of the Santo Daime community also have hinários of their own, or collections of hymns that they have authored through direct, unaltered revelation from the divine. The process of experiencing such new songs in this context is referred to as "receiving". These are not artistic works that are created, they are spiritual testaments, received directly via divine epiphany.

== Denominational diversification and conflicts ==
The death of Mestre Irineu in 1971 resulted in a diversification within the Santo Daime community. The resulting schism formalized into fiercely opposed socio-political factions. The original orthodox group, Alto Santo, currently led by Peregrina Gomes Serra, operates as a non-expansionist branch restricted strictly to the city of Rio Branco.

Conversely, a distinct group known as CEFLURIS (now called ICEFLU) was formed when Sebastião Mota de Melo, commonly called Padrinho Sebastião ("Godfather Sebastião"), left the original center with a group of his followers. Many of Padrinho Sebastião's initial followers were Brazilians from the country's affluent south or citizens of other South American countries who were drawn to the Daime due to their background in middle-class counterculture. Presently led by Alfredo Gregório de Melo, ICEFLU leveraged this demographic to aggressively expand the doctrine internationally, establishing a presence in at least 43 countries across all inhabited continents.

The ideological rift between these factions has been characterized by intense political maneuvering and disputes over the symbolic monopoly of the beverage. Beginning in 1999, Alto Santo cultivated strategic alliances with the state government of Governor Jorge Viana, successfully shifting the regulatory framework of ayahuasca from the Ministry of Justice into the domain of the Ministry of Culture. This political consolidation culminated in September 2006, when the architectural and historical elements of the Alto Santo community were officially recognized as cultural heritage (tombamento) by the state and municipal governments.

Further consolidating their power, Alto Santo established tactical political alliances with other orthodox denominations, specifically the União do Vegetal (UDV) and the Barquinha. On March 4, 2008, this coalition formalized the "Câmara Temática das Culturas Ayahuasqueiras". Through this chamber, the coalition deliberately crafted an exclusivist, sect-like identity by declaring themselves the sole "traditional communities" of the ayahuasca, effectively creating an "invented tradition" designed to delegitimize rivals. They formally categorized ICEFLU practitioners as mere "neo-ayahuasqueiros" to invalidate their doctrine, and isolated indigenous tribes into a distinct "originário" classification, ensuring the traditionalists maintained full socio-political dominance over the beverage's legal and cultural framework. Ironically, under Brazilian legislation regarding traditional communities and territorial resource use, ICEFLU's headquarters in the Purus National Forest theoretically aligns more closely with the legal definition of "traditional" than the urban orthodox groups claiming the title.

In an attempt to codify this dominance, the traditionalist coalition petitioned the National Institute of Historic and Artistic Heritage (IPHAN) to recognize ayahuasca as intangible cultural heritage. IPHAN initiated the inventory process in November 2011. A final qualitative report was produced in 2015, but due to escalating conflicts among the excluded factions—namely ICEFLU and indigenous groups—the formal identification of the cultural assets was left unresolved.

According to church documents, this original split also entailed disagreement over the use of cannabis. Followers of Padrinho Sebastião believed cannabis to be a healing plant teacher, and referred to it as Santa Maria, using it in ceremony to help their mediumship (embodying of spirits for the purpose of healing).

Followers of Mestre Irineu's original church have always regarded the use of cannabis, as well as mediumship generally, as outside the doctrine. Some churches in northern Brazil that denounce cannabis will still sing some hymns of Padrinho Sebastião, but only the ones he received before ever using cannabis.

In the early 1980s, Padrinho Sebastião moved the church headquarters to the village of Céu do Mapiá, in the Brazilian state of Amazonas. Control of CEFLURIS was increasingly shared with its members who joined the movement in the 1970s, and in the 1980s, CEFLURIS established centers in southern Brazil. The group now has affiliates in North America, Europe, and Japan, as well as throughout Brazil.

== Ayahuasca ==
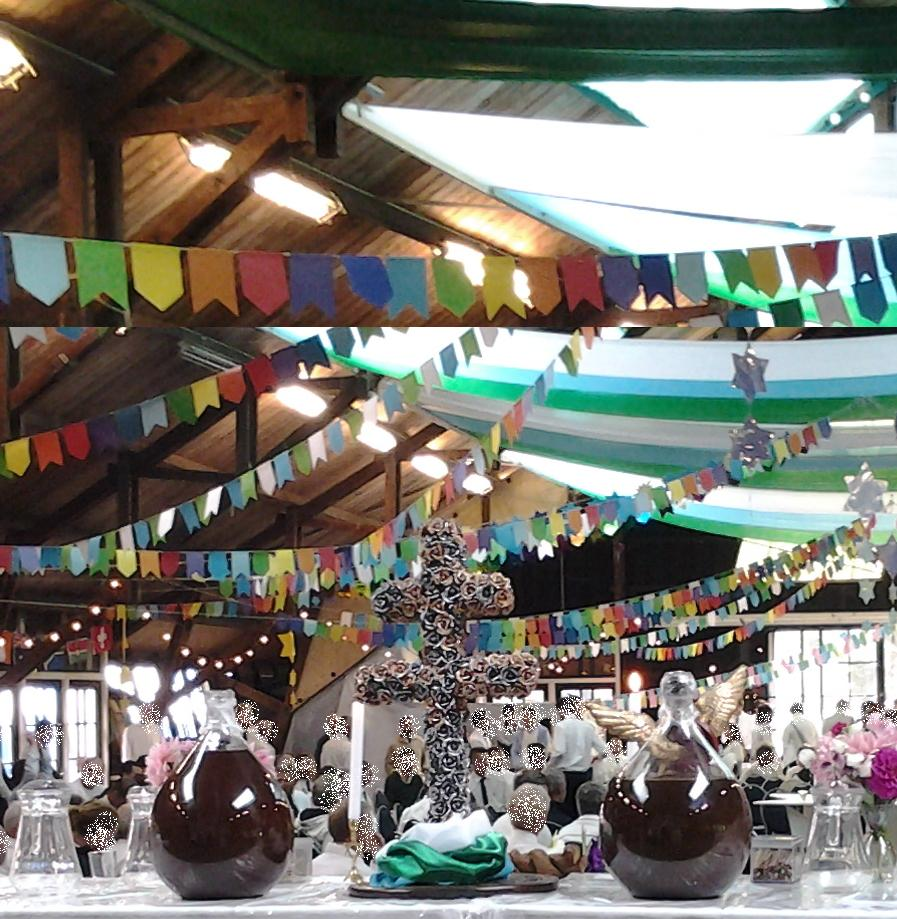
Ayahuasca (called "Santo Daime" within the religion) waiting for the beginning of the ceremonial work. Participants' faces have been obscured for privacy.

The entheogen ayahuasca, which contains the psychoactive compound dimethyltryptamine (DMT), has been the subject of increasing legal scrutiny in the last few decades as Santo Daime has expanded. The decoction has been explicitly legal for religious use in Brazil since 1986, while recent legal battles in Europe have legalized its use in the Netherlands and Spain. In the United States, the Supreme Court in 2006 upheld a preliminary injunction permitting another Brazilian church, the União do Vegetal (UDV), to use ayahuasca ritually. This decision, as the result of specific litigation involving the UDV, applies only to that group, so the legal status of ayahuasca generally remains in a gray area in that country.

Santo Daime's entheogenic sacrament, ayahuasca, has been used for millennia in South American indigenous cultures. It is one of the traditional tools of the shaman in South America, and in many regions, is to this day a common medicine used for finding and treating various ailments, as well as for its vision-inducing effects, which are said to be profound and life-changing.

The tea has had many names including Santo Daime (or simply Daime), Hoasca, Ayahuasca, Yagé, and Caapi. It is made from two or more plants, one a woody vine (Ayahuasca vine or Jagube; generally Banisteriopsis caapi), and the others known as admixtures. While various plants are used throughout South America, most of which have high concentrations of dimethyltryptamine, the preferred admixture in the case of Santo Daime is Psychotria viridis, known to church members as "Rainha" or "Queen of the Forest," after the figure who is said to have appeared to the church's founder in a vision, prompting him to start the religion. DMT occurs naturally in the human body and is speculated to be released at the time of death, but it is normally digested in the stomach if consumed and an MAOI (monoamine oxidase inhibitor), in this case tetrahydroharmine, harmine and harmaline, is needed to allow it to reach the brain in this way, thus the use of the vine. The Santo Daime Church uses only the B. caapi vine and the P. viridis leaf, not adding any other plants to the mixture. The tea is prepared ceremonially over a week by members of the church in a work ("trabalho") called a 'feitio'. Hymns are sung, and Daime is drunk throughout while the men pound the vine into powder and the women clean and sort the leaves. Because of the very specific manner in which they prepare their sacrament, and the very specific way in which they use it, the beverage is not called 'Ayahuasca', but 'Santo Daime'. In some communities, there are very clear distinctions.

=== Internationalization and spiritual tourism ===
The rapid global expansion of ayahuasca, heavily driven by the international reach of ICEFLU and the broader neo-ayahuasqueiro circuit, has created a highly lucrative, transnational spiritual tourism market. This widespread commercialization and internationalization has yielded critical safety and ethical failures. Prominent among these negative impacts are documented instances of severe abuse against women—including sexual assault—occurring under the guise of ritual healing, compounded by an overall lack of safety protocols and ceremonial credibility within various touring hubs. International non-governmental organizations, such as ICEERS, cite these severe structural abuses, alongside a growing commodification and separation of the beverage from its sociocultural origins, as urgent motivators for their lobbying efforts to install overarching regulatory mechanisms via global intangible heritage declarations.

== Legal status ==
Due to their usage of ayahuasca as a sacrament and the spread of the religion, Santo Daime has found itself at the center of court battles and legal disputes in various countries.

=== Brazil ===
In Brazil, CONFEN (the Federal Drug Council) has consistently upheld the right of the Santo Daime Church to practice its religion and healing practices using Daime. A study was made of the Daime by the CONFEN in 1987 which included visits to the various churches and observation of the making of the Daime. It also included study of another group of ayahuasca users, who call the drink vegetal (União do Vegetal – UDV). The work group which made the study included representatives not only of the CONFEN but also of several other government agencies. The conclusion of the study was that the Daime was a very positive influence in the community, encouraging social harmony and personal integration. The study noted that, rather than simply considering the pharmacological analysis of the plants, it was essential to consider the whole context of the use of the tea—religious, social, and cultural.

=== United States ===
In the United States, court battles over ritual use of ayahuasca have mostly been fought by the UDV, and practitioners of the Santo Daime doctrine are watching these events closely. So far, UDV has been able to continue practicing legally thanks to Supreme Court decisions that soundly rejected attempts by the government to prohibit it. As of September 2008, UDV is in negotiations with the Drug Enforcement Administration regarding regulation of their use of ayahuasca.

In September 2008, three Oregon Santo Daime churches and one in California filed a joint lawsuit in federal court to gain legal status. Their trial ended 23 January 2009. The case, Church of the Holy Light of the Queen v. Mukasey, presided over by Judge Owen M. Panner, was ruled in favor of the Santo Daime church.

In March 2009, Panner found that the use of hallucinogenic tea by members of such churches was legal, issuing an injunction barring the government from penalizing them for its consumption.

=== Canada ===
In June 2017, the Santo Daime Church Céu do Montréal received religious exemption to use Ayahuasca as a sacrament in their rituals.

Céu de Toronto also received religious exemption to use Ayahuasca as a sacrament in their rituals.

=== Europe ===
In the Netherlands, Santo Daime won a court case in 2001 which allowed them to continue their ceremonial usage of ayahuasca. One factor in this decision was a fax from the Secretary of the International Narcotics Control Board to the Netherlands Ministry of Public Health, stating that [P]reparations (e.g. decoctions) made of these plants, including ayahuasca are not under international control and, therefore, not subject to any of the articles of the 1971 Convention.

In France, Santo Daime won a court case allowing them to use the decoction in early 2005; however, they were not allowed an exception for religious purposes, but rather for the simple reason that they did not perform chemical extractions to end up with pure DMT and harmala and the plants used were not scheduled. Four months after the court victory, the common ingredients of ayahuasca as well as harmala were declared stupéfiants, or narcotic scheduled substances, making the Daime and its ingredients illegal to use or possess.

The most recent decision came in Italy in 2006; an eight-month-long investigation had led to the arrest of 24 Italian Santo Daime members in early 2005, but the May 2006 ruling found that no sufficient evidence had been presented to demonstrate that the church members had broken Italian law. In 2023 they lost the court case, so that they are not allowed to use the ayahuasca.

== Academic research ==
Two particularly important research projects are worth highlighting. The first is the official investigation made by the Brazilian government at the end of the 1980s, which resulted in the legalization of the religious use of ayahuasca in Brazil in 1992. The second is 'The Hoasca Project' developed by a collective of international scholars. The Hoasca Project presented important findings regarding the use of ayahuasca as an agent of healing, something it is famous for in its indigenous context.

Another longitudinal research using a control group, but also controlling for rural vs. urban area, was conducted by a team of Spanish researchers and looked at church members that have used ayahuasca for 15 years and at least 2 times per month. The study was led by José Carlos Bouso and funded by the Multidisciplinary Association for Psychedelic Studies. The study "found no evidence of psychological maladjustment, mental health deterioration or cognitive impairment in the ayahuasca-using group."

== See also ==
- Psychedelic church
- União do Vegetal
