= Boca do Acre =

Municipality of Amazonas, Brazil

- Municipality
- Flag Coat of arms

- Location of the municipality inside Amazonas
- Coordinates: 8°45′7″S 67°23′52″W
- Country: Brazil
- Region: North
- State: Amazonas

Population (2020)
  - Total: 34,635
- Time zone: UTC−4 (AMT)

Boca do Acre (Mouth of Acre) is a municipality located in the Brazilian state of Amazonas. Its population was 34,635 (2020) and its area is 22,349 km^{2}.

The municipality holds 92% of the 311,000-hectare (770,000-acre) Mapiá-Inauini National Forest, created in 1989. It also contains the 133,637-hectare (330,220-acre) Arapixi Extractive Reserve, created in 2006.
