= Rio Negro Left Bank Environmental Protection Area =

Environmental protection area in Amazonas, Brazil

- Área de Proteção Ambiental Margem Esquerda do Rio Negro
- IUCN category VI (protected area with sustainable use of natural resources)
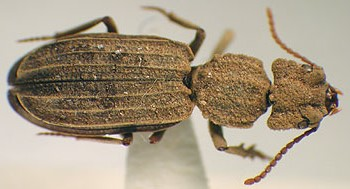
- Solenogenys funkei paratype Tarumã-Mirim River - Igapó

- Location within Brazil
- Nearest city: Manaus, Amazonas
- Coordinates: 2°09′36″S 60°28′21″W
- Area: 611,008 hectares (1,509,830 acres)
- Designation: Environmental protection area
- Created: 2 April 1995
- Administrator: Centro Estadual de Unidades de Conservação do Amazonas

The Rio Negro Left Bank Environmental Protection Area (Portuguese: Área de Proteção Ambiental Margem Esquerda do Rio Negro) is an environmental protection area in the state of Amazonas, Brazil. It protects an area of Amazon rainforest on the left bank of the Rio Negro near Manaus. There is a small human population, and sustainable use of forest resources is allowed. The southern section, near to Manaus, is subject to pressure from poor residents of an official settlement project who clear forest to make charcoal for sale in the city.

== Location ==
South Rio Negro conservation units 9: Rio Negro Left Bank APA

The Rio Negro Left Bank Environmental Protection Area (APA) is divided between the Amazonas municipalities of Manaus (74.64%), Novo Airão (23.61%) and Presidente Figueiredo (1.75%). It has an area of 611,008 hectares (1,509,830 acres).

The APA is divided into two unconnected sections. The larger Aturiá–Apuauzinho section covers land to the north and east of the Anavilhanas National Park, which protects the Rio Negro's Anavilhanas archipelago in this region, and surrounds the Rio Negro State Park South Section on the west, north and east. It adjoins the Puranga Conquista Sustainable Development Reserve to the south. To the east it is bounded by the BR-174 highway. The smaller Tarumã Açu – Tarumã Mirim section lies between the Puranga Conquista reserve to the west and the city of Manaus to the east, and is bounded by part of the left bank of the Rio Negro in the south. The southern section contains two small segments of the Biological Dynamics of Forest Fragments Project Area of Relevant Ecological Interest, created in 1985.

== History ==
The Rio Negro Left Bank Environmental Protection Area (APA) was created by Amazonas state governor decree 16.498 of 2 April 1995 for the purpose of protecting and conserving the quality the environment, natural systems and regional ecosystems while improving the lives of the local people. Law 2646 of 22 May 2001 altered the boundaries of the Rio Negro State Park North Section and South Section, and the Rio Negro Left Bank and Right Bank environmental protection areas. The Aturiá–Apuauzinho section of the Left Bank APA now had an area of 586,422 hectares (1,449,080 acres) and the Tarumã Açu – Tarumã Mirim section now had an area of 56,793 hectares (140,340 acres). It became part of the Central Amazon Ecological Corridor, established in 2002.

Law 4015 of 24 March 2014 altered the boundaries of the Rio Negro State Park South Section and the Aturiá-Apuauzinho section of the Left Bank APA, and created the Puranga Conquista Sustainable Development Reserve. The Left Bank APA was reduced to a total area of 611,008 hectares (1,509,830 acres).

== Environment ==
The Aturiá–Apuauzinho section of the APA is in the Uatumã–Trombetas interfluvial region. Vegetation includes rainforests and areas of campinarana and sub-montane forest in the Presidente Figueiredo region. It is part of the Lower Rio Negro Mosaic of conservation units and the Amazon Central Corridor. It is drained by the Cuieiras River. It serves as a buffer zone for the fully protected national and state parks. It is a habitat for the Guianan cock-of-the-rock (Rupicola rupicola), pied tamarin (Saguinus bicolor) and harpy eagle (Harpia harpyja).

The Tarumã Açu – Tarumã Mirim section is mainly covered by dense rainforest but has areas of open tropical forest and campinarana. It is drained by the Tarumã Açu and Tarumã Mirim rivers. It contains a plateau area with palm trees, human presence and livestock. The plateau areas have high species diversity. Law 2646 of 22 May 2001 prohibits activities in APAs that may damage the environment or biota including earth moving, mining and dredging. Existing agriculture and livestock activities may continue, but not in ways that may damage the environment such as use of pesticides or overgrazing.

The Tarumã-Açu and Tarumã-Mirim are blackwater rivers, acidic and low in minerals. Water levels vary by 1.5 to 3 metres (4 ft 11 in to 9 ft 10 in), with highest levels in June.

== Human activities ==
There are human communities along the edge of the state park and along BR-174 in Presidente Figueiredo in the Aturiá–Apuauzinho section of the APA. More than 100 families live in this section, mainly engaged in hunting, farming and subsistence fishing. There is relatively little non-timber extraction from the forest other than fiber for crafts and straw for homes. There is intense logging.

The Instituto Nacional de Colonização e Reforma Agrária (National Institute for Colonization and Agrarian Reform – INCRA) created the Tarumã-Mirim Settlement Project on 10 August 1992, located parallel to the BR-174 Manaus-Boa Vista highway between the Tarumã-Açu and Tarumã-Mirim rivers. The settlement project is almost all in the Tarumã Açu – Tarumã Mirim section of the APA. It covers 42,910.76 hectares (106,034.8 acres) with 1,042 lots, averaging 25 hectares (62 acres) for family farming and 7,088.62 hectares (17,516.4 acres) of collective forest reserves.

There is conflict between conservation goals and activities of the settlers such as burning wood for charcoal. The settlers engage in intensive deforestation in hillside and riparian areas, and often do not use the cleared land for farming. At least two tons of charcoal are sold weekly, usually informally, at a price up to 400% lower than the price in Manaus. The poor families in the settlement also depend on poached game from the forest for nutrition. Typically these families have low income, little education, poor sanitation, lack of access to medical services, insecure land titles and lack of assistance in controlled plant extraction. Most do not know about the APA requirements. There is a lack of dialog between the government and the communities, and lack of understanding of how the families survive. They understand the value of preserving the forest but need the income from charcoal.

Economic activities with good potential include crafts using lianas and extraction of non-timber products and medicinal herbs for the pharmaceuticals industry. Valuable forest plant species include Copaifera species, Carapa guianensis, Açaí palm (Euterpe oleracea), buriti (Mauritia flexuosa), Oenocarpus bataua and Oenocarpus bacaba. The main agricultural products are cassava flour, cassava, banana, pineapple, sugar cane and passion fruit. Coconut and rice farming are starting to be developed. The rivers provide fish.

== Sources ==
- APA Margem Esquerda do Rio Negro (in Portuguese), ISA: Instituto Socioambiental
- ARIE Proj. Dinâmica B. de Fragmentos Florestais (in Portuguese), ISA: Instituto Socioambiental
- CEC Central da Amazônia (in Portuguese), ISA: Instituto Socioambiental
- Costa, Joanne; Tapia-Coral, Sandra; Soares, Edison; Mota, Adelaide; Silva, Adriana (December 2011), "Conflitos na Área de Preservação Ambiental Tarumã-Açu/Tarumã-Mirim: proteger para quem?" (PDF), Resumos do VII Congresso Brasileiro de Agroecologia, Fortaleza/CE
