= Lower Rio Negro Mosaic =

- Mosaico do Baixo Rio Negro
- IUCN category V (protected landscape/seascape)
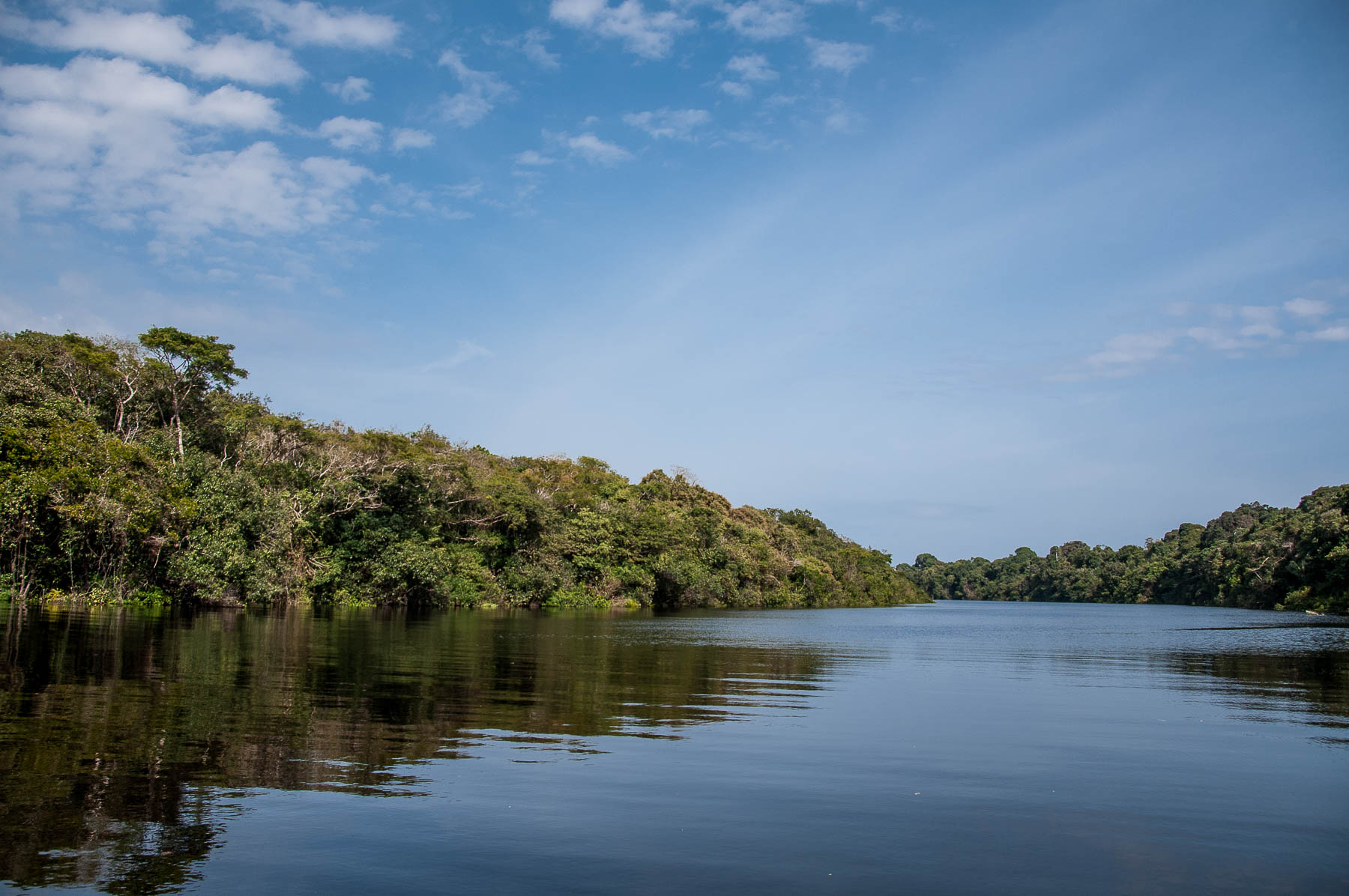
- Anavilhanas National Park

- Location within Brazil
- Nearest city: Manaus
- Coordinates: 2°30′32″S 60°57′25″W
- Area: 7,412,849 hectares (18,317,550 acres)
- Designation: Protected area mosaic
- Created: 14 December 2010

The Lower Rio Negro Mosaic (Portuguese: Mosaico do Baixo Rio Negro is a protected area mosaic in the state of Amazonas, Brazil. It coordinates between eleven conservation units of different types in the Amazon rainforest to the northwest of the state capital, Manaus.

== Location ==
The Lower Rio Negro Mosaic was established to cover 11 protected area in six Amazonas municipalities: Manaus, Novo Airão, Iranduba, Manacapuru, Barcelos and Presidente Figueiredo, with a total area of 7,412,849 hectares (18,317,550 acres). It contains conservation units in the Amazon biome in the state of Amazonas. The mosaic is part of the Central Amazon Biosphere Reserve and Ecological Corridor. It covers an area of high biodiversity and high socio-cultural diversity. It includes igapó, terra firma forest, campina, campinaranas, and caatinga-igapós.

== Background ==
The people of the mosaic include traditional riparian communities, indigenous people, artisan fishers, small farmers and gatherers, as well as people involved in tourism, extraction, business and government. Traditional occupations include slash-and-burn agriculture, plant and animal extraction, logging, hunting, crafts and tourism. The local residents have the knowledge needed for sustainable development such as ecotourism, non-timber extraction, agriculture, fishing and other practices.

Creation of the Manaus Free Trade Zone in the 1960s generated intensive population movement into the region and economic growth, and also created social, economic and environmental problems that persist today. Creation of conservation units in the 1980s and 1990s without public consultation caused further conflicts. Many of the traditional residents began to organize and claim rights to access natural resources and territory.

== Creation and objectives ==
The proposal to create the mosaic was prepared by IPÊ - Instituto de Pesquisas Ecológicas (Institute of Ecological Research) and submitted in January 2005 to the Fundo Nacional do Meio Ambiente – FNMA (National Environment Fund). Various government agencies, non-governmental organizations and civil society groups participated in developing the plan. The Waimiri Atroari Indigenous Territory also participated in the process of creating the mosaic, with the possibility of becoming one of its components. The Lower Rio Negro Mosaic was recognized by ordnance 483 of the Brazilian Ministry of the Environment on 14 December 2010.

The National System of Conservation Units (SNUC) law defines a mosaic as a collection of protected areas of the same or different categories that are near to each other, adjoin each other or overlap, and that should be managed as a whole. Given the different categories of conservation unit and other protected areas in a mosaic, including fully protected and sustainable use units, the different conservation goals must be considered.

== Conservation units ==
South Rio Negro conservation units. The Jaú National Park (top left), Amanã Sustainable Development Reserve and Rio Unini Extractive Reserve extend far to the west.

The Lower Rio Negro Mosaic contains the following conservation units:

Map	Name	Level	Created	Area (ha)
	Amanã Sustainable Development Reserve	State	1998	2,350,000
10	Anavilhanas National Park	Federal	1981	350,470
1	Jaú National Park	Federal	1980	2,367,333
7	Puranga Conquista Sustainable Development Reserve (Note: The Puranga Conquista Sustainable Development Reserve was created in 2014 and added to the mosaic.)	State	2014	76,936
9	Rio Negro Left Bank Environmental Protection Area (Note: The Rio Negro Left Bank Environmental Protection Area was counted as two units when the mosaic was created, the Aturiá–Apuauzinho section and the smaller Tarumã Açu – Tarumã Mirim section.)	State	1995	611,008
3	Rio Negro Right Bank Environmental Protection Area	State	1995	461,741
8	Rio Negro State Park North Section	State	1995	146,028
2	Rio Negro State Park South Section	State	1995	86,601
4	Rio Negro Sustainable Development Reserve	State	2003	103,086
	Rio Unini Extractive Reserve	Federal	2006	833,352
	Tupé Sustainable Development Reserve	Municipal	2005	11,930

== Sources ==
- Mosaico do Baixo Rio Negro (in Portuguese), ICMBio: Chico Mendes Institute for Biodiversity Conservation
- Mosaicos de áreas protegidas (in Portuguese), ISA: Instituto Socioambiental, archived from the original on 2016-06-20
- RDS Puranga Conquista (in Portuguese), ISA: Instituto Socioambiental
- Thiago Mota Cardoso (2010), Depoimento: o mosaico do baixo rio Negro (in Portuguese), IPÊ-Instituto de Pesquisas Ecológicas
- Unidades de Conservação - Mosaico do Baixo Rio Negro (in Portuguese), ICMBio: Chico Mendes Institute for Biodiversity Conservation
