= Puranga Conquista Sustainable Development Reserve =

- Reserva de Desenvolvimento Sustentável Puranga Conquista
- IUCN category VI (protected area with sustainable use of natural resources)
- Location within Brazil
- Nearest city: Manaus, Amazonas
- Coordinates: 2°52′43″S 60°21′20″W
- Area: 76,936 hectares (190,110 acres)
- Designation: Sustainable development reserve
- Created: 24 March 2014

Puranga Conquista Sustainable Development Reserve (Note: The word "Puranga" means "beautiful" in the Nheengatu language. "Conquista", or "conquest", refers to the victory of the traditional indigenous and non-indigenous residents of the area before the state park was created.) (Portuguese: Reserva de Desenvolvimento Sustentável Puranga Conquista) is a sustainable development reserve (RDS) in the state of Amazonas, Brazil. It protects an area of Amazon rainforest on the left bank of the Rio Negro near Manaus. The reserve was carved out of the Rio Negro State Park South Section after a lengthy struggle by the occupants of the area who had lived there for years before the state park was created.

== Location ==
South Rio Negro conservation units 7: Puranga Conquista Sustainable Development Reserve

The Puranga Conquista Sustainable Development Reserve (RDS) is in the municipality of Manaus in the state of Amazonas. There are fifteen communities within the RDS: Deus Proverá, Tatulandia, Caioé, Baixote, Araras, Bela Vista, Santa Maria, Terra Preta, Vila Nova do Chita, Pagodão, e Barreirinha, Boa Esperança, Nova Esperança, São Francisco do Solimõeszinho and Nova Canaã. It has an area of 76,936 hectares (190,110 acres).

The RDS is on the left (east) bank of the Rio Negro, most of which is protected by the Anavilhanas National Park. To the north the Cuieiras River defines the boundary with the Rio Negro State Park South Section and the Aturiá-Apuauzinho section of the Rio Negro Left Bank Environmental Protection Area. To the east it is bordered by the Tarumã Mirim River and the Tarumã Açu – Tarumã Mirim section of the Rio Negro Left Bank APA. It is part of the Lower Rio Negro Mosaic.

== Background ==
The Cuieiras River area was originally inhabited by various indigenous groups, particularly the Tarumã, who were decimated during the Portuguese colonisation of the region around Manaus. Indigenous families from the middle Solimões River and upper Rio Negro began to settle in areas along the Cuieiras river in the 1960s, and founded seven communities. The communities are ethnically diverse, including Cocama, Baniwa, Tucano, Ticuna, Mura, Baré, Sateré-Mawé and Carapana people. There were conflicts with non-indigenous people who also moved into the region. When the Rio Negro State Park South Section was created in 1995 the existing population of indigenous and non-indigenous people was not taken into account.

The indigenous people first asked for formal land titles from FUNAI in 1996, but for many years received no results. A long campaign for regularisation of property rights began. A delegation from the Jaraqui riverine community met councillor Sinésio Campos in the second half of 1997 asking if he could change the state park into a sustainable development reserve so they would be able to improve their land and implement economic projects. The communities living in and around the park only became aware of restriction on use of land and natural resources when they were contacted by the Institute for Ecological Research (IPÊ) and others in 2003. The legal conflict prevented implementation of infrastructure and public services in the communities and restricted agriculture and extractive activities despite their being sustainable in nature.

The Permanent Forum in Defence of Riverine Communities of Manaus (FOPEC) was established in 2006 to lobby for creation of a sustainable reserve. Public hearings were held by the Legislative Assembly's Environmental Committee in July 2010. On 28 December 2010 a law was passed to allow the lands occupied by traditional populations in the park to become a sustainable development reserve. Lengthy negotiations followed with the Instituto Nacional de Colonização e Reforma Agrária (National Institute for Colonization and Agrarian Reform), Programa Terra Legal (Federal land title granting agency), Superintendência da Zona Franca de Manaus (owner of the land around the reserve), the navy (which occupies an area on the right bank of the Cuieiras River) and Fundação Nacional do Índio (National Indian Foundation – FUNAI). The communities rejected all compromise measures and insisted on the RDS.

== Creation and operation ==
In January 2014 a federal justice granted an injunction requested by the Federal Public Ministry of Amazonas that FUNAI should create a technical group to demarcate the indigenous land and submit a final report within six months. The judge said that the lengthy delays had allowed non-indigenous people to move in and caused great damage to the indigenous communities. Demarcation should allow delivery of infrastructure such as a school and health clinic.

The Puranga Conquista Sustainable Development Reserve was finally created by law 4015 of 24 March 2014 to support sustainable development for the traditional populations who were living in the Rio Negro State Park South Section.

The law amended the boundaries of the state park and the Aturiá-Apuauzinho section of the Rio Negro Left Bank Environmental Protection Area to create the reserve with an area of 76,936 hectares (190,110 acres). 85% of the RDS was from the state park.

Creation of the RDS was hailed as a great victory for the indigenous Baré and Kambeba people and the riverine communities who had lived in the area for more than twenty years before the state park was created.

Objectives were to conserve the ecosystems and to support scientific, cultural, educational and recreational activities in an area where the threatened pied tamarin (Saguinus bicolor) is found. Environmental and social groups have expressed concern that the reduced protection may result in the reserve being used by private interests or government sectors in an indiscriminate manner, as had happened with the downgrading of the conservation units on the Tapajós so a complex of hydroelectric power plants could be built. On 2–8 September 2014 eight researcher from the IPÊ, in partnership with the Grupo Natureza, Sociedade e Conservação (NSC), met with 169 families in the RDS to complete the Social and Environmental Indicators for Conservation Units questionnaire. A simplified set of 21 indicators was used. Results would be used to guide programs to promote sociobiodiversity in the region.

== Sources ==
- Elaíze Farias (27 January 2014), "Índios do rio Cuieiras (AM) recriam cultura e pedem demarcação", Amazônia Real (in Portuguese)
- IPÊ e NSC aplicam questionário do SISUC na RDS Puranga Conquista (in Portuguese), IPÊ
- PES do Rio Negro Setor Sul (in Portuguese), ISA:Instituto Socioambiental
- RDS Puranga Conquista (in Portuguese), ISA: Instituto Socioambiental
- Roberto Brasil (22 March 2014), Parque Estadual do Rio Negro é agora RDS Puranga Conquista (in Portuguese)
