= Rio Negro State Park South Section =

State park in Amazonas, Brazil

- Parque Estadual do Rio Negro Setor Sul
- IUCN category II (national park)
- Location within Brazil
- Nearest city: Manaus, Amazonas
- Coordinates: 2°33′21″S 60°27′14″W
- Area: 86,601 hectares (214,000 acres)
- Designation: State park
- Created: 2 April 1995
- Administrator: Centro Estadual de Unidades de Conservação do Amazonas

Rio Negro State Park South Section (Portuguese: Parque Estadual do Rio Negro Setor Sul) is a State park in the state of Amazonas, Brazil. It protects an area of Amazon rainforest to the east of the Rio Negro that is home to the endangered pied tamarin. The area was reduced in 2001 and was further reduced in 2014 to create a sustainable development reserve for the people that had been living there since before the park was created.

== Location ==
South Rio Negro conservation units 8: Rio Negro State Park South Section

The Rio Negro State Park South Section is in the municipality of Manaus in the state of Amazonas. The park is about 40 kilometres (25 mi) from the city of Manaus, accessible from there by boat. It has an area of 86,601 hectares (214,000 acres).

The park is near the right (east) bank of the Rio Negro near the point where it joins the Amazon River, set back about 5 kilometres (3.1 mi) from the river. The Rio Negro in this region is protected by the Anavilhanas National Park. The Margem Esquerda do Rio Negro Environmental Protection Area surrounds the park on the west, north and east. The Cuieiras River defines its south and east boundary. The Puranga Conquista Sustainable Development Reserve is to the south of the park, on the opposite side of the Cuieiras.

== Environment ==
The Rio Negro State Park South Section is in the central Amazonia corridor, in the Lower Rio Negro Mosaic. It protects part of the basin of the Cuieiras river. The river and the Araras and Jaraqui streams, tributaries of the Rio Negro, are low-lying and have flooded mouths. The main plant formations are Igapó forest, dense terra firma forest and Campinarana. Wildlife is very diverse. It includes the pied tamarin (Saguinus bicolor), an endemic primate, in the south of the park and the red-handed tamarin (Saguinus midas) on the right bank of the Cuieiras.

== History ==
The two sections of the Rio Negro State Park were created by state governor Amazonino Mendes by decree 16.497 of 2 April 1995 with the stated purpose of preserving its natural ecosystems without alteration and supporting scientific, cultural, educational and recreational activities. Tourism was clearly the primary purpose. The state park had a total area of 436,042 hectares (1,077,480 acres) of which the north section had an area of 178,620 hectares (441,400 acres) and the south section had an area of 257,422 hectares (636,100 acres).

Law 2646 of 22 May 2001, also signed by governor Amazonino Mendes, reduced the areas of both sections. The north section now had 146,028 hectares (360,840 acres) and the south had 157,807 hectares (389,950 acres). The original sections had both extended along both banks of the Rio Negro. With the revised boundaries the north section was reduced to a smaller part of the right (west) bank of the Rio Negro, although it now extended further to west, and the south section was reduced to a smaller part of the left (east) bank of the river. It became part of the Central Amazon Ecological Corridor, established in 2002. The park is administered by the Centro Estadual de Unidades de Conservação do Amazonas (State Centre of Amazonas Conservation Units). The consultative council for the south section was created on 22 November 2010. The conservation unit is supported by the Amazon Region Protected Areas Program.

When the state park was created the existing population of indigenous and non-indigenous people was not taken into account. A long campaign for regularisation of property rights began. On 28 December 2010 a law was passed to allow the lands occupied by traditional populations in the park to become a sustainable development reserve. On 24 March 2014 a law created the Puranga Conquista Sustainable Development Reserve and changed the limits of the Rio Negro State Park South Section and the Aturiá-Apuauzinho section of the Margem Esquerda do Rio Negro Environmental Protection Area. The area of the state park was reduced to 86,601 hectares (214,000 acres).

== Sources ==
- CEC Central da Amazônia (in Portuguese), ISA: Instituto Socioambiental
- Elaíze Farias (27 January 2014), "Índios do rio Cuieiras (AM) recriam cultura e pedem demarcação", Amazônia Real (in Portuguese)
- Full list: PAs supported by ARPA, ARPA
- PES do Rio Negro Setor Sul (in Portuguese), ISA:Instituto Socioambiental
- Sérgio Henrique Borges; Yara da Rocha Camargo; Clarice Bassi; Marcelo Paustein Moreira; Simone Iwanaga; Marcelo Garcia (August 2008), Plano de Gestão do Parque Estadual Rio Negro Setor Norte (PDF) (in Portuguese), vol. I - Diagnóstico da Unidade de Conservação, Manaus, archived from the original (PDF) on 2023-03-24
