= Castanheiras Pied Tamarin Wildlife Refuge =

Brazilian wildlife refuge

- Refúgio da Vida Silvestre Sauim Castanheiras
- Location within Brazil
- Nearest city: Manaus, Amazonas
- Coordinates: 3.0908°S 59.9259°W
- Area: 95 hectares (230 acres)
- Designation: Ecological Reserve
- Created: 12 August 1982

The Castanheiras Pied Tamarin Wildlife Refuge (Portuguese: Refúgio da Vida Silvestre Sauim Castanheiras), formerly Castanheiras Pied Tamarin Ecological Reserve, is a wildlife refuge in the municipality of Manaus, Amazonas, Brazil. It was created in 1982 to protect a colony of pied tamarins.

== Foundation ==
The Reserva Ecológica de Sauim-Castanheiras was created by Presidential Decree 87.455 on 12 August 1982 with an area of 109.2 hectares (270 acres). The reserve was located in the Industrial District on the outskirts of the Manaus Free Zone. The purpose was to protect populations of pied tamarins (Portuguese: Sauim, Saguinus bicolor) and Brazil nuts (Bertholletia excelsa).

The wildlife refuge today occupies 95 hectares (230 acres). From 2001 it was managed by the Municipal Office of the Environment and Sustainability (Secretaria Municipal de Meio Ambiente e Sustentabilidade, Semmas) for the Manaus Prefecture. It became part of the Central Amazon Ecological Corridor, established in 2002. The refuge has access roads, administrative buildings, a kitchen for food preparation for animals, an autopsy building, a veterinary centre with inpatient rehabilitation structures and grounds.

== Activities ==
South Rio Negro conservation units 5: Castanheiras Pied Tamarin Wildlife Refuge

The wildlife refuge contains a Wild Animal Screening Centre (CETAS) and an Animal Rescue Service. These help wild animals that are threatened by risks such as habitat loss, domestic abuse, accidents and other problems. A veterinarian examines the animal and treats it if necessary. Where practical it is restored to nature. Otherwise it may be allocated to a zoo or other institution. The refuge is not open to the public.

== Sources ==
- Áreas Protegidas (in Portuguese), Semmas, archived from the original on 2016-04-10
- CEC Central da Amazônia (in Portuguese), ISA: Instituto Socioambiental
- Mário David Andreazza (12 August 1982), DECRETO Nº 87.455, DE 12 DE AGOSTO DE 1982 (in Portuguese)
- "Refúgio da Vida Silvestre Sauim Castanheiras", No Amazonas é Assim (in Portuguese)
- RESEC Sauim-Castanheira (in Portuguese), ISA: Instituto Socioambiental
- Reserva Ecológica Sauim Castanheira (in Portuguese), ViaRural, archived from the original on 2018-01-04
