= Rio Negro Right Bank Environmental Protection Area =

Environmental protection area in Amazonas, Brazil

- Área de Proteção Ambiental Margem Direita do Rio Negro
- IUCN category VI (protected area with sustainable use of natural resources)
- Location within Brazil
- Coordinates: 2°46′06″S 61°06′05″W
- Area: 461,741 hectares (1,140,990 acres)
- Designation: Environmental protection area
- Created: 2 April 1995
- Administrator: Centro Estadual de Unidades de Conservação do Amazonas

The Rio Negro Right Bank Environmental Protection Area (Portuguese: Área de Proteção Ambiental Margem Direita do Rio Negro) is an environmental protection area (APA) in the state of Amazonas, Brazil.

== Location ==
South Rio Negro conservation units 3: Rio Negro Right Bank APA

Parts of the Rio Negro Right Bank Environmental Protection Area lies in the municipalities of Iranduba (21.17%), Manacapuru (18.96%) and Novo Airão (59.87%) in the state of Amazonas. It covers most of the land along the right (west) bank of the Rio Negro from the mouth of the Puduari River, which separates it from the Rio Negro State Park North Section south to the point where it joins the Solimões River to form the Amazon River at Manaus, including part of the left bank of the Solimões. It does not include the section of the right bank covered by the Rio Negro Sustainable Development Reserve, or the surroundings of the town of Novo Airão. The section from Manaus to Novo Airão is mainly accessed by boat or float plane. There is also access along the AM-340 highway. The APA has an area of 461,741 hectares (1,140,990 acres).

== Environment ==
The Rio Negro Right Bank Environmental Protection Area is in the central Amazonia corridor and is part of the Lower Rio Negro Mosaic. It protects the extensive forests of the Rio Negro in the Central Amazon Plain. The APA is drained by white water and black water rivers in the interfluvial region of the Rio Negro and Solimões basins, including várzea lowland areas and higher terra firma. In the section north of Novo Airão the forests are almost intact, but further south there are degraded areas in the municipality of Iranduba due to the proximity of Manaus.

There are over 40 species of mammals including the endangered jaguar (Panthera onca) and giant otter (Pteronura brasiliensis). There are more than 300 species of birds, including the endangered black-and-white hawk-eagle (Spizaetus melanoleucus) and harpy eagle (Harpia harpyja). The APA is home to many species of frogs, lizards and snakes, and several of turtles and alligators, including the endangered black caiman (Melanosuchus niger). Over 100 species of fish have been identified, including the endangered Arapaima gigas.

== People ==
There are 30 communities in the APA, mainly engaged in subsistence fishing but also practising commercial fishing, farming, livestock raising and manufacture of flour, canoes and boats, brooms and handicrafts. The main commercial fish are the Semaprochilodus taeniurus and Semaprochilodus insignis. The APA has several archaeological sites. The villages of Paricatuba and Acajatuba are tourist attractions.

== History ==
The Rio Negro Right Bank APA was created by Amazonas state governor decree 16.498 of 2 April 1995. State law 2646 of 22 May 2001 modified the limits of the Rio Negro State Park North Section and South Section, and the Rio Negro Left Bank and Right Bank APAs. The Rio Negro Right Bank APA, Puduari - Solimões Section, now had an area of 566,365 hectares (1,399,520 acres). It became part of the Central Amazon Ecological Corridor, established in 2002. The limits of the APA were again altered by state law 3355 of 26 December 2008. On 9 September 2014 a working group was established to review the limits of the Puduari-Solimões section of the Margem Direita do Rio Negro Environmental Protection Area and the Rio Negro State Park North Section to compensate for land used to create the new campus for the Amazonas State University.

== Sources ==
- APA Margem Direita do Rio Negro (in Portuguese), ISA: Instituto Socioambiental
- CEC Central da Amazônia (in Portuguese), ISA: Instituto Socioambiental
