= Central Amazon Ecological Corridor =

Ecological corridor in Brazil

- Corredor Ecológico Central da Amazônia
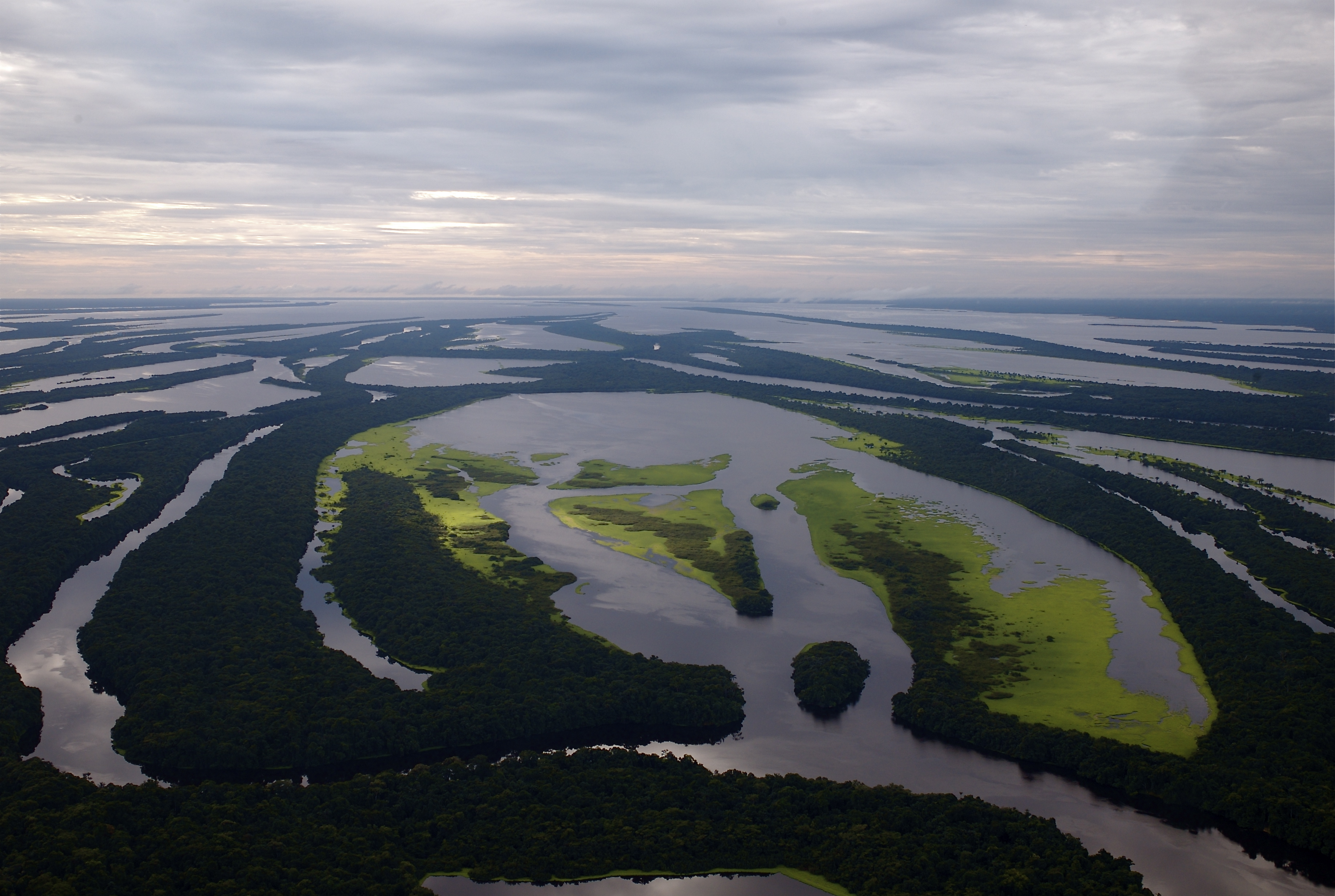
- Anavilhanas National Park from the air

- Location within Brazil
- Coordinates: 3.33°S 67.92°W
- Area: 52,159,206 hectares (128,888,200 acres)
- Designation: Ecological corridor
- Created: 15 March 2002
- Administrator: Federal Ministry of the Environment

The Central Amazon Ecological Corridor (Portuguese: Corredor Ecológico Central da Amazônia) is an ecological corridor in the state of Amazonas, Brazil, that connects a number of conservation units in the Amazon rainforest. The objective is to maintain genetic connectivity between the protected areas without penalizing the local people, where possible using participatory planning that involves all affected actors.

== Location ==
The Central Amazon Ecological Corridor connects a number of conservation units in the central Amazon region with a combined area of 52,159,206 hectares (128,888,200 acres). The corridor covers parts of the Solimões and Negro river basins, mostly in the state of Amazonas but with a small portion in the state of Pará. The main urban centers in the corridor are the cities of Manaus, Manacapuru and Tefé. If indigenous territories are included, over 70% of the corridor was contained in protected areas in 2005.

The corridor is of great ecological importance. It includes parts of several major rivers with different aquatic environments such as the Jutaí, Japurá, Juruá, Solimões, Tefé and Rio Negro, and many smaller rivers, streams, bayous, and várzea and terra firma lakes. It covers formations from the Tertiary period with terra firma and black water and Pleistocene and Holocene floodplains formed by the deposit of white water sediments. Unlike other ecological corridors in Brazil there is very high connectivity between the conservation units, so genetic transfer has not been strangled by human disturbance in the unprotected areas.

== History ==
Implementation of protected reserves and parks has not guaranteed sustainability of natural systems due in part to lack of supporting infrastructure and staff, to the isolation of the protected units as islands, and to lack of involvement of actors within and around the protected unit. In an attempt to address this, ecological corridors are assembled from protected areas, indigenous lands and areas with different types of land use, forming a connected whole. The management approach is participatory, involving government and non-government actors. The Central Amazon Corridor and the Central Atlantic Forest Ecological Corridor were prioritized to test and address different conditions in the two main forest biomes in Brazil. Lessons learned would be applied in creation of other corridors.

The agreement to implement the Central Amazon Ecological Corridor was signed on 28 December 2001, and came into effect on 15 March 2002 when the required conditions had been met. The overall goal of the corridor was to retain the integrity of the large area covered by the corridor as far as possible without penalizing the local people. If protected area mosaics are shown to be compatible with the basic corridor design, a participatory process for internal zoning of the corridor may be established within the existing legislation. The secondary objectives of the corridor therefore aim at integrated management and participation by different social sectors in addition to those always considered in ecological corridors projects.

An agreement to cooperate on restoration and environmental recovery was signed on 24 August 2010 between the Ministry of the Environment and the University of Amazonas Foundation. The purpose was to define methods of ensuring support for restoring degraded areas in the ecological corridors, enabling and involving the actors in the native species forestry production chain, and protecting the biodiversity of the corridor through participatory management and social mobilization in the areas between conservation units, and through studies and surveys.

== Actors ==
Implementation of the corridor involves actors from all levels of government and from civil society.

=== National level ===
At the national level the actors include:

- Ministry of the Environment (Department of the Amazon Legal)
- Brazilian Institute of Environment and Renewable Natural Resources (IBAMA)
- Fundação Nacional do Índio (FUNAI – National Indian Foundation)
- Brazilian Agricultural Research Corporation (EMBRAPA)
- National Institute of Amazonian Research (INPA)
- National Institute for Space Research (INPE)
- Instituto Nacional de Colonização e Reforma Agrária (INCRA – National Institute for Colonization and Agrarian Reform)
- Federal universities of the region
- Superintendência do Desenvolvimento da Amazônia (SUDAM – Superintendency of Development for the Amazon)
- Eletronorte
- National Council for Scientific and Technological Development (CNPq)
- Museu Paraense Emílio Goeldi (Goeldi Museum)
- The media and environmental NGOs

=== Regional level ===
At a regional level actors include:

- IBAMA Superintendence of the State of Amazonas
- Instituto de Proteção Ambiental do Amazonas (IPAAM – State of Amazonas Institute of Environmental Protection)
- Local private sector, mainly linked to Ecotourism
- Empresa Amazonense de Turismo (EMANTUR)
- Agrarian Development Institute of the State of Amazonas (IDAM)
- Landowners
- Instituto de Terras do Amazonas (ITERAM)
- Superintendência da Zona Franca de Manaus (SUFRAMA)
- University of Amazonas Foundation (FUA) and local media and local NGOs.
- Regional media and NGOs.

=== Local level ===
Local actors include local civil society associations such as fishing communities, loggers' associations and other groups dedicated to the exploitation of natural resources, as well as:

- The Church
- Municipal authorities,
- Units of the National Health Foundation (FNS / Sucam)
- Decentralized units of Amazonas state government and its departments
- Rural workers' union
- IBAMA posts (POCOFs)
- Local media and NGOs

== Conservation Units ==
The Central Amazon Ecological Corridor connects the following conservation units:

Unit	Type	Level	Created	Area (ha)
Amanã	Sustainable development reserve	State	1998	2,350,000
Anavilhanas	National park	Federal	1981	350,470
Auatí-Paraná	Extractive reserve	Federal	2001	146,950
Baixo Juruá	Extractive reserve	Federal	2001	187,982
Biological Dynamics of Forest Fragments Project	Area of relevant ecological interest	Federal	1985	3,288
Catuá-Ipixuna	Extractive reserve	State	2003	217,486
Caverna do Maroaga	Environmental protection area	State	1990	374,700
Cujubim	Sustainable development reserve	State	2003	2,450,380
Jaú	National park	Federal	1980	2,367,333
Javari-Buriti	Area of relevant ecological interest	Federal	1985	15,000
Juami-Japurá	Ecological station	Federal	2001	745,830
Jutaí-Solimões	Ecological station	Federal	1983	284,285
Mamirauá	Sustainable development reserve	State	1996	1,100,000
Médio Juruá	Extractive reserve	Federal	1997	251,577
Rio Jutaí	Extractive reserve	Federal	2002	275,533
Rio Negro Left Bank	Environmental protection area	State	1995	611,008
Rio Negro North Section	State park	State	1995	146,028
Rio Negro Right Bank	Environmental protection area	State	1995	461,741
Rio Negro	Sustainable development reserve	State	2008	103,086
Rio Negro South Section	State park	State	1995	86,601
Rio Unini	Extractive reserve	Federal	2006	833,352
Rio Urubu	State forest	State	2003	27,342
Sauim-Castanheira	Ecological reserve	Federal	1989	109
Sumaúma	State park	State	2003	53
Tefé	National forest	Federal	1989	1,020,000
Uacari	Sustainable development reserve	State	2005	632,949
Uatumã	Biological reserve	Federal	2002	938,720
Uatumã	Sustainable development reserve	State	2004	424,430

== Sources ==
- CEC Central da Amazônia (in Portuguese), ISA: Instituto Socioambiental
- Mercadante, Dr. Mauricio (2005). "PROJETO CORREDORES ECOLÓGICOS". MMA (FTP) (in Portuguese). (To view documents see Help:FTP)
- Projeto Corredores Ecológicos (in Portuguese), MMA
