= Velho Airão =

Former Brazilian town

- Ghost town
- Interactive map of Velho Airão
- Coordinates: 1°56′24″N 61°21′11″W
- Founded: 1694
- Depopulated: 1985

Population (2015)
  - Total: 1

Velho Airão or Airão Velho is an almost uninhabited town in the Brazilian state of Amazonas. Originally called Airão, it was founded in 1694 on the banks of the Negro River and became a medium-sized settlement. It is located within the Mosaic of the Lower Rio Negro in the Rio Negro State Park North Section and is the former headquarters of the municipality of Novo Airão.

== History ==
The town of Airão was founded in 1694 by Portuguese settlers. It is located 180 km from Manaus, the capital of Amazonas. In the beginning, missionary priests lived in the area, relying mainly on hunting and fishing. For the first 200 years, Airão was a poor town, but the situation improved during the rubber cycle. Between 1879 and 1912, the Amazon rainforest experienced a major latex exploration, which transformed the region into a hotspot for politicians and other countries. During World War II, the Allied countries used Brazilian latex to manufacture tires and surgical materials.

At the time, large houses were built using materials imported directly from Portugal. Airão gathered rubber production from the Upper Negro River, the Jaú River and its tributaries, and the Branco River, transporting production from villages near Boa Vista. In 1945, after the end of the war, the British started buying latex from their colony in Malaysia. Airão, as a collection and distribution point, went bankrupt. Part of the population moved to villages closer to Manaus, but most were relocated to Itapeaçu, which was renamed Novo Airão. In 1985, the last resident left.

From 1985, the Brazilian Navy started using the site as a target for firing practice by its ships until 2005, when the town was listed as a landmark by the National Institute of Historic and Artistic Heritage (IPHAN). Since 2005, around seven families have moved back to the area, establishing their homes around the ruins and helping to guide tourists who visit the old village. Shigeru Nakayama, a Japanese man who arrived in Brazil in the 1960s along with the influx of Japanese immigrants, is the only person who still lives in the area.

== See also ==
- History of Amazonas
