= Tarumã Mirim River =

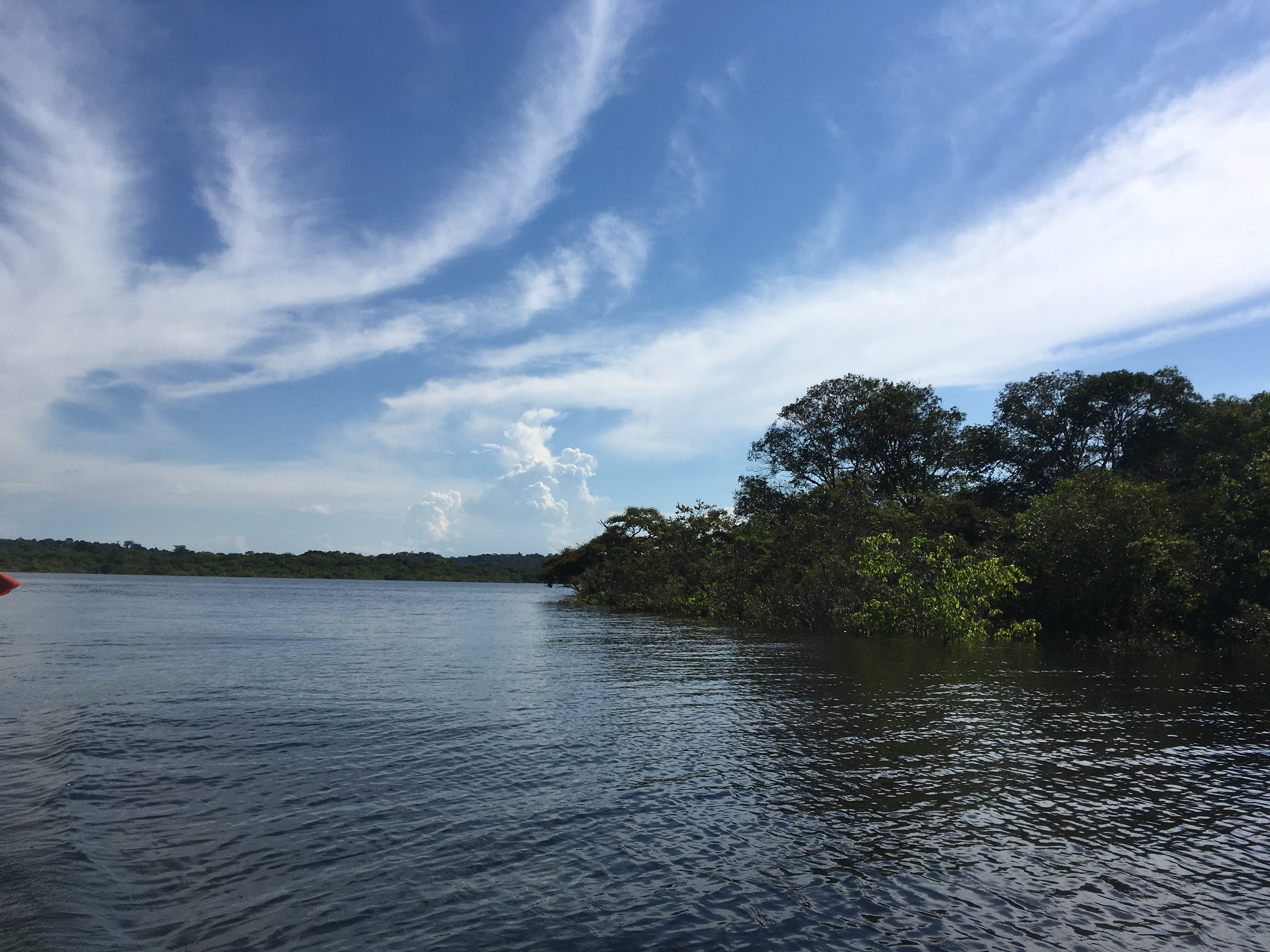

- Location within Brazil
- Native name: Igarapé Tarumã Mirim (Portuguese)

Location
- Country: Brazil

Physical characteristics
- Mouth
  - coordinates: 3.031557°S 60.163610°W

Basin features
- River system: Rio Negro

The Tarumã Mirim River (Portuguese: Igarapé Tarumã Mirim) is a river in the state of Amazonas, Brazil. It is a left tributary of the Rio Negro, which it enters west of the city of Manaus.

== Course ==
The Tarumã Mirim drains the west part of the Tarumã Açu – Tarumã Mirim section of the Rio Negro Left Bank Environmental Protection Area (APA), which is mainly covered by dense rainforest but has areas of open tropical forest and campinarana. It separates the APA from the Puranga Conquista Sustainable Development Reserve to the west.

The Tarumã-Açu and Tarumã Mirim are blackwater rivers, acidic and low in minerals. Water levels vary by 1.5 to 3 metres (4 ft 11 in to 9 ft 10 in), with highest levels in June.

== See also ==
- List of rivers of Amazonas

== Sources ==
- APA Margem Esquerda do Rio Negro (in Portuguese), ISA: Instituto Socioambiental
- Costa, Joanne; Tapia-Coral, Sandra; Soares, Edison; Mota, Adelaide; Silva, Adriana (December 2011), "Conflitos na Área de Preservação Ambiental Tarumã-Açu/Tarumã-Mirim: proteger para quem?" (PDF), Resumos do VII Congresso Brasileiro de Agroecologia, Fortaleza/CE
