= Amazonas State University =

Brazilian public university

- Universidade do Estado do Amazonas
- Type: Public
- Established: 1973 as UTAM; 2001 officially UEA
- Endowment: R$229,647,000 (2011)
- President: Cleinaldo de Almeida Costa
- Administrative staff: 1,931
- Students: 17,533
- Location: Manaus, Amazonas, Brazil
- Campus: Manaus, Parintins, Presidente Figueiredo, Itacoatiara, Carauari, Tabatinga, Tefé, Lábrea, Boca do Acre, Coari, Eirunepé, Humaitá, Manicoré, Manacapuru, Novo Aripuanã, Maués and São Gabriel da Cachoeira
- Website: uea.edu.br

The Amazonas State University (Portuguese: Universidade do Estado do Amazonas, UEA) is a Brazilian public university operated by the state of Amazonas, located in Manaus, Amazonas, Brazil. It was established in 2001 by a state law that turned the University of Technology of Amazonas (Universidade de Tecnologia do Amazonas) into the UEA. In 2011, UEA was ranked the best university of the state in an evaluation made by the Ministry of Education.

== History ==
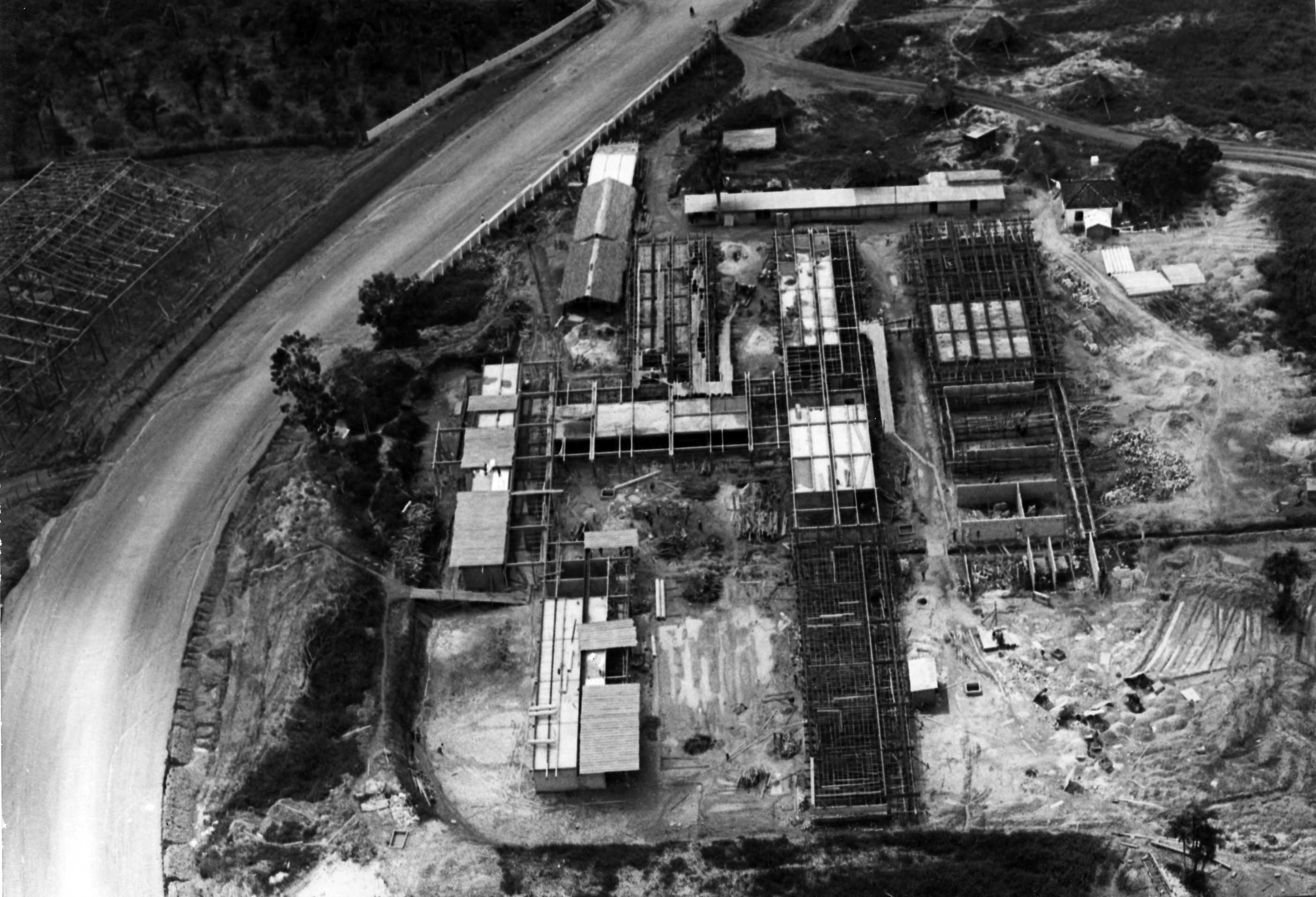
Aerial view of the UTAM blocks when under construction. Today it houses the UEA Higher School of Technology.

=== School of Technology of Amazonas ===
The University of the State of Amazonas was previously called University of Technology of Amazonas (Portuguese: Universidade de Tecnologia do Amazonas or UTAM). UTAM was established by a state law in 14 of December 1972. A posterior law, of 10 of October 1977 turned the university in an institute, but it remained called as university.

The creation of UTAM started with an educational policy, created by the Governor of the State of Amazonas, Colonel João Walter de Andrade, that observed the insufficiency of technicians for industry.

Since its foundation in 1973, UTAM has offered courses in Operational Engineering (Wood, Mechanic, Electronic and Electrotechnical), Mechanic Maintenance, Civil Construction, Topography and Highways. In 1977, the Ministry of Education abolished Operational Engineering so the administrators of UTAM started to offer courses of Technology at a Superior level. In 1986 UTAM started an Engineering course. The course in Data processing started in 1992 and Computer Engineering started in 1997.

=== Transformation to UEA ===
In 2001 the Mayor of Manaus signed a law that turned the University of Technology of Amazonas into the University of the State of Amazonas. It has campuses in 17 cities of Amazonas. In 2011 it was the best university of the north region of Brazil, according to a Ministry of Education exam, called ENADE.

=== New Iranduba Campus ===
With the opening of the Manaus-Iranduba Bridge, the Amazonas Government will build a university city in the city of Iranduba, located in the other margin of the Rio Negro River, inside the Manaus Metropolitan Area. The reserved area is located 7 km from the bridge and has 10,000 hectares. In 2011 the topographic studies were made and in the first semester of 2012 the bidding will be made. All of the courses will be transferred to this new campus. In the project is also included a university hospital.

== Admissions ==
There are two forms to enter UEA.

- SIS (Sistema de Ingresso Seriado - Serial Admission System) is an exam that the students take at high school. It consists of three exams, one per high school year. At Brazil, High School takes three years to be finished, also called as "Ensino Médio" in Portuguese.
- Vestibular (the name of the Admission exam) is made of two exams on consecutive days. The first exam is about general knowledge and the second one is about specific knowledge. However, the Exame Nacional do Ensino Médio (ENEM - National High School Exam) can be used to replace the grades of general knowledge exam if the grades of ENEM are higher than the first exam.

== Campus ==
The structure of UEA is divided into Superior Schools (located in Manaus) and Center for Studies.

=== Superior Schools ===
- Escola Superior de Tecnologia (Superior School of Technology)
- Escola Superior Normal (Normal Superior School)
- Escola Superior de Artes e Turismo (Superior School of Arts and Tourism)
- Escola Superior de Ciências da Saúde (Superior School of Health)
- Escola Superior de Ciências Sociais (Superior School of Social Sciences)

The campus in Manaus have a total area of 52.073 m^{2}.

=== Center for Studies ===
- Centro de Estudos Superiores de Itacoatiara (Center for Superior Studies of Itacoatiara)
- Centro de Estudos Superiores de Lábrea (Center for Superior Studies of Lábrea)
- Centro de Estudos Superiores de Parintins (Center for Superior Studies of Parintins)
- Centro de Estudos Superiores de São Gabriel da Cachoeira (Center for Superior Studies of São Gabriel da Cachoeira)
- Centro de Estudos Superiores de Tabatinga (Center for Superior Studies of Tabatinga)
- Centro de Estudos Superiores de Tefé (Center for Superior Studies of Tefé)
- Núcleo de Ensino Superior de Boca do Acre (Center for Superior Studies of Boca do Acre)
- Núcleo de Ensino Superior de Carauari (Center for Superior Studies of Carauari)
- Núcleo de Ensino Superior de Coari (Center for Superior Studies of Coari)
- Núcleo de Ensino Superior de Eirunepé (Center for Superior Studies of Eirunepé)
- Núcleo de Ensino Superior de Humaitá (Center for Superior Studies of Humaitá)
- Núcleo de Ensino Superior de Manacapuru (Center for Superior Studies of Manacapuru)
- Núcleo de Ensino Superior de Manicoré (Center for Superior Studies of Manicoré)
- Núcleo de Ensino Superior de Maués (Center for Superior Studies of Maués)
- Núcleo de Ensino Superior de Novo Aripuanã (Center for Superior Studies of Nvo Aripuanã)
- Núcleo de Ensino Superior de Presidente Figueiredo (Center for Superior Studies of Presidente Figueiredo)

== Courses ==
Escola Superior de Tecnologia

- Civil Engineering
- Mechanical Engineering
- Chemical Engineering
- Production Engineering
- Computer Engineering
- Electrical Engineering
- Engineering of Control and Automation
- Forest Engineering
- Meteorology
- Technology in Systems Development
- Technology in Industrial Automation
- Technology in Electronics
- Technology in Mechanical Maintenance
- Technology in Data Processing

Escola Normal Superior

- Biological Sciences
- Geography
- Portuguese Language
- Mathematics
- Pedagogy
- Science Education
- Science Education in Amazon

Escola Superior de Artes e Turismo

- Dance
- Music - Sing
- Music - Instruments
- Music - Regency
- Theatre
- Tourism
- Tourism and Social Development

Escola Superior de Ciências da Saúde

- Biotechnology
- Collective Health
- Nursing
- Medicine
- Odontology

Escola Superior de Ciências Sociais

- Administration
- Public and Citizen Security
- Law
- Accounting Sciences
- Economics
- Military Sciences and Public Safety

== See also ==
- List of state universities in Brazil
