= Sumaúma State Park =

State park in Manaus, Brazil

- IUCN category II (national park)
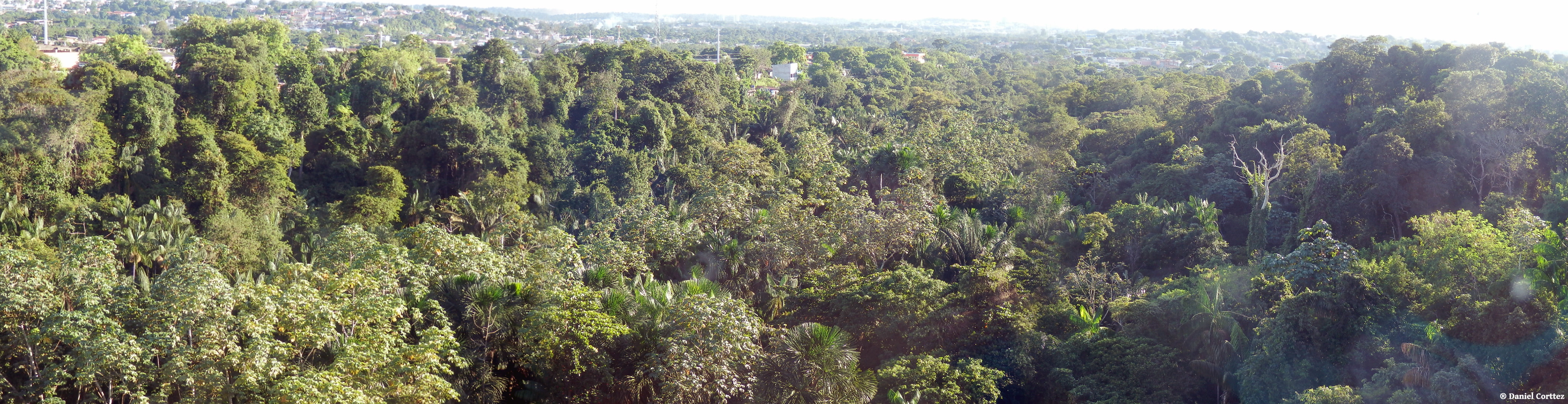
- Sumaúma State Park

- Location within Brazil
- Nearest city: Manaus, Amazonas
- Coordinates: 3°02′07″S 59°58′52″W
- Area: 53 hectares (130 acres)
- Designation: State park
- Administrator: Centro Estadual de Unidades de Conservação do Amazonas

The Sumaúma State Park (Portuguese: Parque Estadual Sumaúma) is a small state park within the city of Manaus in the state of Amazonas, Brazil. It is located in the heart of a densely populated neighbourhood, and is threatened by pollution and illegal extraction and hunting.

== Location ==
The Sumaúma State Park is in the city of Manaus. It is south of Avenida Noel Nutels and east of Avenida Governador José Lindoso in the north east of the city, one of the mostly densely populated parts of the Manaus urban area. It has an area of 53 hectares (130 acres). Two springs rise in the park and feed the Igarapé do Mindú, which runs through the city. The park contains an educational walk, a community centre, recreation area and seedling nursery. The park is decorated with statues representing animals and legendary people of the Amazon. Visitors can climb an artificial "tree of life" 15 metres (49 ft) high.

== History ==
The park was created by decree 23.721 of 5 September 2003 with an area of about 51 hectares (130 acres). It was the result of efforts to protect one of the few remaining green spaces in the city by the Cidade Nova bairro, which contains the park, the Urban Forest Fragments volunteer group and the Legislative Assembly. It became part of the Central Amazon Ecological Corridor, established in 2002. The consultative council was created on 24 August 2007, and the management plan was approved on 2 March 2009. On 24 April 2012 the boundary was adjusted to encompass about 52.6 hectares (130 acres). 50 volunteer environmental agents help with the park. The park was pillaged in 2014, and reopened in February 2015 with surveillance cameras and 24 hour security.

== Environment ==
The park is named after the Sumaúma tree (Ceiba pentandra). It contains remnants of primary forest, low and high rainforest, grassland and Mauritia flexuosa palms. There are over 80 species of birds, some endemic to the palms. The park is home to various small mammals, including the threatened pied tamarin (Saguinus bicolor). Other species include the brown-throated sloth (Bradypus variegatus), red-rumped agouti (Dasyprocta leporina) and green iguana (Iguana iguana).

The park is contaminated with garbage dumped from the surrounding houses and with discharges from sewers into the streams. Other threats are illegal removal of wood and other forest products, hunting of small mammals and noise pollution, which may affect reproduction. The areas under most threat are the flatter areas, and those around the edge of the park or along the trails. The steeper slopes have suffered less.

== Sources ==
- CEC Central da Amazônia (in Portuguese), ISA: Instituto Socioambiental
- Davi Grijó Cavalcante; Eduardo da Silva Pinheiro; Mariza Alves de Macedo; Jan Feldmann Martinot; André Zumak Azevedo Nascimento; Jenifer Pereira Castilho Marques (August 2010), "Análise da vulnerabilidade ambiental de um fragmento florestal urbano na Amazônia: Parque Estadual Sumaúma", Sociedade & Natureza, 22 (2), Uberlândia, ISSN 1982-4513
- Oswaldo Neto (25 January 2015), Parque Estadual Sumaúma reabre em fevereiro com oito ambientes temáticos em Manaus (in Portuguese), Manaus
- Parque Estadual Sumaúma (in Portuguese), SEMA, 25 April 2015
- PES Sumaúma (in Portuguese), ISA: Instituto Socioambiental
