= Rio Negro State Park North Section =

State park in Amazonas, Brazil

- Parque Estadual do Rio Negro Setor Norte
- IUCN category II (national park)
- Location within Brazil
- Nearest city: Novo Airão, Amazonas
- Coordinates: 2°08′49″S 61°25′43″W
- Area: 146,028 hectares (360,840 acres)
- Designation: State park
- Created: 2 April 1995
- Administrator: Centro Estadual de Unidades de Conservação do Amazonas

The Rio Negro State Park North Section (Portuguese: Parque Estadual do Rio Negro Setor Norte) is a state park in the state of Amazonas, Brazil. It protects an area of Amazon rainforest to the west of the Rio Negro.

== Location ==
South Rio Negro conservation units 2: Rio Negro State Park North Section

The Rio Negro State Park North Section is in the municipality of Novo Airão in the state of Amazonas. It has an area of 146,028 hectares (360,840 acres) and a perimeter of 237.15 kilometres (147.36 mi). It is 167 kilometres (104 mi) from Manaus, and is accessed by boat from the Rio Negro.

To the northeast the state park is bounded by the right bank of the Rio Negro. The state park adjoins the Jaú National Park along its north west boundary. Most of this boundary follows the Carabinani River, which flows north east to enter the Jaú River a few kilometres before that river enters the Rio Negro. The state park adjoins the Rio Negro Right Bank Environmental Protection Area along its south east boundary, which is formed by the Puduari River. The terrain rises to a maximum elevation of 108 metres (354 ft) in the watershed in the centre of the park.

== Environment ==
The region in which the Rio Negro State Park North Section lies has a humid tropical climate with average monthly temperatures no lower than 18 °C (64 °F). Monthly rainfall is highest in April, at an average of around 400 millimetres (16 in) and lowest in August with about 150 millimetres (5.9 in). The park includes open igapó forest, higher terra firma forest areas and campinarana forests. 13% is open rainforest and 87% dense rainforest. Euterpe catinga and Bactris species are found in the campinarana. The economically useful Mezilaurus itauba and Heteropsis flexuosa are found in the terra firma forest.

There are diverse aquatic species including the Arapaima gigas and Cichla species. About 30 species of bees have been identified and 100 of ants. There are over 200 bird species including the rare pavonine cuckoo (Dromococcyx pavoninus), nocturnal curassow (Nothocrax urumutum), white-naped seedeater (Dolospingus fringilloides) and Pelzeln's tody-tyrant (Hemitriccus inornatus). Threats include extraction of lianas, gravel and sand, commercial fishing, military exercises, hunting, logging and unregulated tourism.

== People ==
About 30 families live in the Rio Negro State Park North Section, mostly in the Castanho and Velho Airão communities, which has the ruins of the first Portuguese city on the Rio Negro from the 16th century. The families are mainly descended from indigenous groups. Most of the families live exclusively by agriculture, particularly cultivation of bananas and cassava. Fishing and liana extraction were the main extractive activities in the past. Other extractive products today include sorva, copaiba and piassava. There is some organised work at the tourist centre.

== History ==
The Rio Negro State Park North Section was created by state governor Amazonino Mendes by decree 16.497 of 2 April 1995 with the stated purpose of preserving its natural ecosystems without alteration and supporting scientific, cultural, educational and recreational activities. Tourism was clearly the primary purpose. The Rio Negro State Park had a total area of 436,042 hectares (1,077,480 acres) of which the north section had an area of 178,620 hectares (441,400 acres) and the south section had an area of 257,422 hectares (636,100 acres). Law 2646 of 22 May 2001, also signed by governor Amazonino Mendes, reduced the areas of both sections. The north section now had 146,028 hectares (360,840 acres) and the south had 157,807 hectares (389,950 acres).

The original sections had extended along both banks of the Rio Negro, with the north section reaching almost to the city of Novo Airão. With the revised boundaries the north section was reduced to a smaller part of the right (west) bank of the Rio Negro, although it now extended further to west, and the south section was reduced to a smaller part of the left (east) bank of the river. Land ownership was complex, with areas belonging to the federal, state and municipal governments, to individuals and squatters. Part of the park is designated for use by the Ministry of Defence as a training site for the Navy Command Unit based in Manaus.

The park became part of the Central Amazon Ecological Corridor, established in 2002. Actions to implement the park began in 2004 when the Instituto de Proteção Ambiental do Amazonas (IPAAM) made the first meetings with the lower Rio Negro communities in the context of the Ecological Corridors Project, with the initial purpose of establishing a single council for the mosaic of state and federal conservation units in the lower Rio Negro. The first expedition to the Carabinani river to collect biological data were made in October 2004. In 2005 an office was opened in the city of Novo Airão and three technicians were hired. In 2007 some training began so the residents of the park and its surroundings could act as voluntary environmental agents.

The consultative council was created on 12 June 2008, and the management plan was approved on 2 March 2009. The state park became part of the Lower Rio Negro Mosaic, created in 2010. On 9 September 2014 a working group was established to review the limits of the Puduari-Solimões section of the Margem Direita do Rio Negro Environmental Protection Area and the Rio Negro Setor Norte State Park to compensate for land used to create the new campus for the Amazonas State University. The conservation unit is supported by the Amazon Region Protected Areas Program.

== Sources ==
- CEC Central da Amazônia (in Portuguese), ISA: Instituto Socioambiental
- Full list: PAs supported by ARPA, ARPA
- Parque Estadual do Rio Negro - Setor Norte (in Portuguese), Via Rural, archived from the original on July 1, 2016
- PES do Rio Negro Setor Norte (in Portuguese), ISA: Instituto Socioambiental
- Sérgio Henrique Borges; Yara da Rocha Camargo; Clarice Bassi; Marcelo Paustein Moreira; Simone Iwanaga; Marcelo Garcia (August 2008), Plano de Gestão do Parque Estadual Rio Negro Setor Norte (PDF) (in Portuguese), vol. I - Diagnóstico da Unidade de Conservação, Manaus, archived from the original (PDF) on 2023-03-24
- Thiago Mota Cardoso (2010), Depoimento: o mosaico do baixo rio Negro (in Portuguese), IPÊ-Instituto de Pesquisas Ecológicas
