= Tarumã Açu River =

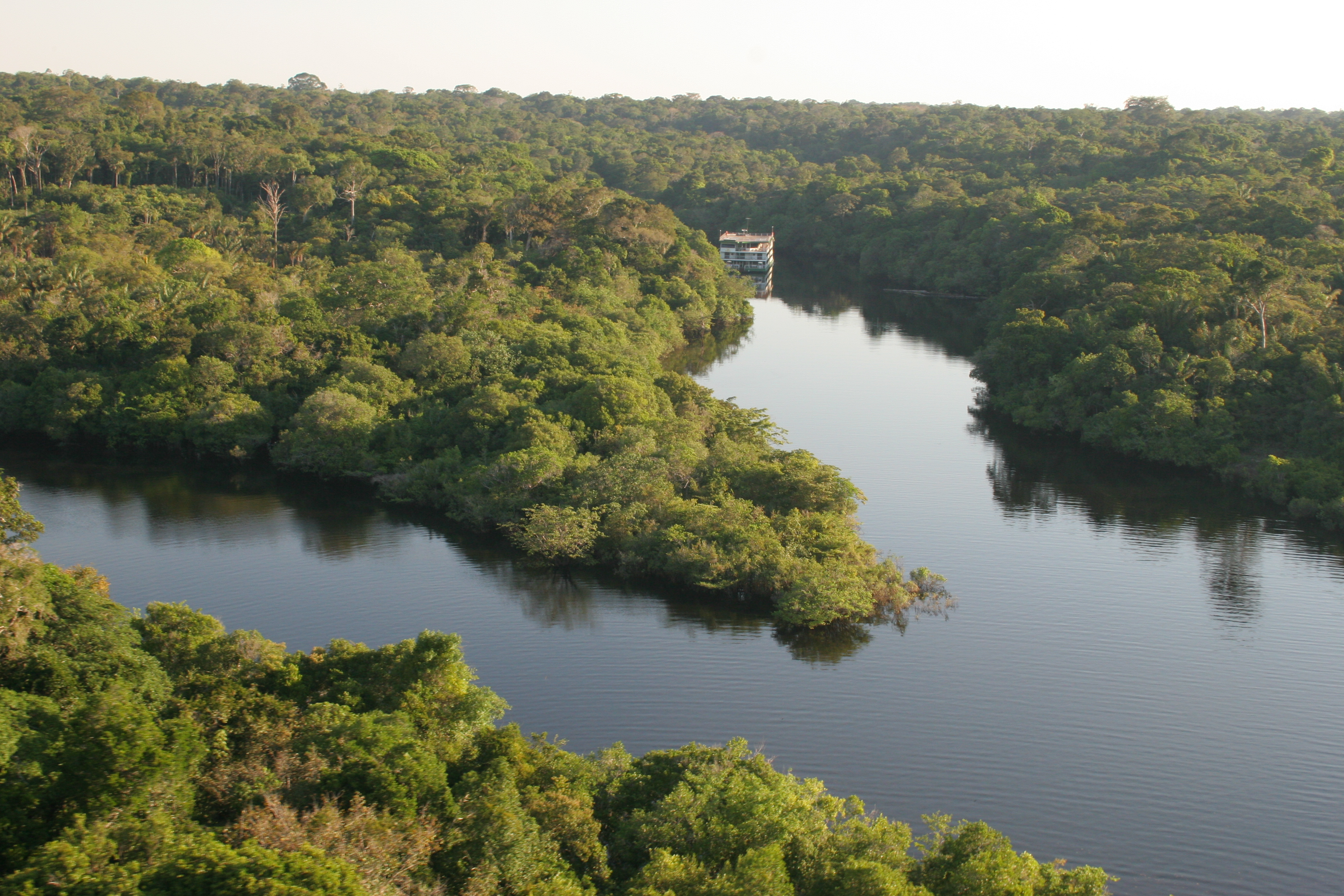

- Location within Brazil
- Native name: Igarapé Tarumã Açu (Portuguese)

Location
- Country: Brazil

Physical characteristics
- Mouth
  - coordinates: 3.043250°S 60.112746°W

Basin features
- River system: Rio Negro

The Tarumã Açu River (Portuguese: Igarapé Tarumã Açu) is a river in the state of Amazonas, Brazil. It is a left tributary of the Rio Negro, which it enters just west of the city of Manaus.

== Course ==
The Tarumã Açu River originates with a spring in the community of Nova Canã, at kilometre 40 of the BR-174 highway. It drains the east part of the Tarumã Açu – Tarumã Mirim section of the Rio Negro Left Bank Environmental Protection Area, which is mainly covered by dense rainforest but has areas of open tropical forest and campinarana. The lower section of the river corresponds to the western boundary of the Manaus urban area. Several of its left bank tributaries originate in the Adolfo Ducke Forest Reserve and cross the northern and western zones of Manaus. The urban area tributaries are the Igarapé Leão, Igarapé do Mariano, Igarapé do Bolívia, which originate in the Ducke reserve, and the Igarapé do Tarumãzinho, which is completely contained in the Bairro do Tarumã.

The Tarumã Açu and Tarumã Mirim are blackwater rivers, acidic and low in minerals.

Water levels vary by 1.5 to 3 metres (4 ft 11 in to 9 ft 10 in), with the highest levels occurring in June.

== See also ==
- List of rivers of Amazonas

== Sources ==
- APA Margem Esquerda do Rio Negro (in Portuguese), ISA: Instituto Socioambiental
- Costa, Joanne; Tapia-Coral, Sandra; Soares, Edison; Mota, Adelaide; Silva, Adriana (December 2011), "Conflitos na Área de Preservação Ambiental Tarumã-Açu/Tarumã-Mirim: proteger para quem?" (PDF), Resumos do VII Congresso Brasileiro de Agroecologia, Fortaleza/CE
- Neto, Oswaldo (22 March 2015), "Fonte límpida em sítio contribui com a imensidão do igarapé Tarumã-Açu, em Manaus", A Critica (in Portuguese), archived from the original on 2015-07-09
- Rovere, Ana Lúcia Nadalutti La; Crespo, Samyra; Velloso, Rui (2002), Projeto geo cidades: relatório ambiental urbano integrado: informe GEO: Manaus (PDF) (in Portuguese), Rio de Janeiro: PNUMA; Brasil. Ministério do Meio Ambiente. Secretaria de Qualidade Ambiental nos Assentamentos Humanos; Consórcio Perceria 21
