= Rio Negro Sustainable Development Reserve =

Sustainable development reserve in Brazil

- Reserva de Desenvolvimento Sustentável do Rio Negro
- IUCN category VI (protected area with sustainable use of natural resources)
- Location within Brazil
- Nearest city: Iranduba
- Coordinates: 2°59′20″S 60°42′06″W
- Area: 103,086 hectares (254,730 acres)
- Designation: Sustainable development reserve
- Created: 26 December 2008
- Administrator: Centro Estadual de Unidades de Conservação do Amazonas

The Rio Negro Sustainable Development Reserve (Portuguese: Reserva de Desenvolvimento Sustentável do Rio Negro) is a sustainable development reserve (RDS) in the state of Amazonas (Brazilian state), Brazil.

== Location ==
South Rio Negro conservation units 4: Rio Negro RDS

Parts of the Rio Negro Sustainable Development Reserve lie in the municipalities of Manacapuru (3.78%), Iranduba (80.12%) and Novo Airão (16.1%), all in the state of Amazonas to the west of the city of Manaus. It has an area of 103,086 hectares (254,730 acres). The reserve may be accessed from Manaus or Novo Airão by river, or by the paved AM-070 highway and the AM-352 Estrada do Manairão.

The reserve is covered in rain forest. It extends along the right (south west) bank of the Rio Negro above the point where it joins the Solimões River to form the Amazon River. It is surrounded on the south, west and north by the Rio Negro Right Bank Environmental Protection Area. Most of the river and islands opposite the reserve are protected by the Anavilhanas National Park. The reserve belongs to the Central Amazon Corridor and the Lower Rio Negro Mosaic.

== History ==
The Rio Negro Sustainable Development Reserve was created by law 3355 of 26 December 2008 from part of the Rio Negro Right Bank Environmental Protection Area. The objective is to preserve nature and ensure the conditions needed to maintain the lifestyle of the traditional communities, and to conserve and improve the environmental management techniques developed by these communities. It became part of the Central Amazon Ecological Corridor, established in 2002. The deliberative council was created on 22 November 2010. The conservation unit is supported by the Amazon Region Protected Areas Program.

== Economic impact ==
The small farmers in the reserve are mainly engaged in agriculture, managing the timber in the forest and fishing. At time of creation the reserve was thought to have great potential for tourism, with its lakes, beaches, creeks, flooded forests and endemic fauna. Eco-tourism, community-based tourism and ornithological tourism were seen as being the most important.

In 2009 workshops on the Bolsa Floresta Program were given in 16 communities in the reserve. Construction of the new bridge over the Rio Negro was expected to add pressure to the area of the reserve. The Bolsa Floresta program, which provides monthly benefits to participants in the reserve, is designed to prevent further deforestation. The Instituto Nacional de Colonização e Reforma Agrária (National Institute for Colonization and Agrarian Reform) recognised the reserve on 15 December 2009 as meeting the needs of 462 families of small rural farmers, who would qualify for PRONAF credits.

In November 2012 it was announced that the Fundação Amazonas Sustentável (FAS) and Coca-Cola Brasil would provide about R$23 million for community programs in the reserve to support income generation and forest conservation. Coca-Cola has made large donations in the past, used for the Bolsa Floresta program where communities are paid for environmental services. FAS is also supported by the government of the state of Amazonas and Banco Bradesco.

== Sources ==
- CEC Central da Amazônia (in Portuguese), ISA: Instituto Socioambiental
- Florêncio Mesquita (13 November 2012), Reserva de Desenvolvimento Sustentável do Rio Negro terá R$ 23 mi até 2017 (in Portuguese), A Critica
- Full list: PAs supported by ARPA, ARPA
- Marina Guedes (27 March 2009), RDS do Rio Negro recebe oficinas do Programa Bolsa Floresta (in Portuguese), Fundação Amazonas Sustentável
- RDS do Rio Negro (in Portuguese), ISA: Instituto Socioambiental
- Termo de referêcia para elaboração do plano de gestao da reserva de desenvolvimento sustentável rio negro (PDF) (in Portuguese), Novo Airão: ARPA, 28 August 2013
