= Cuieiras River (Rio Negro tributary) =

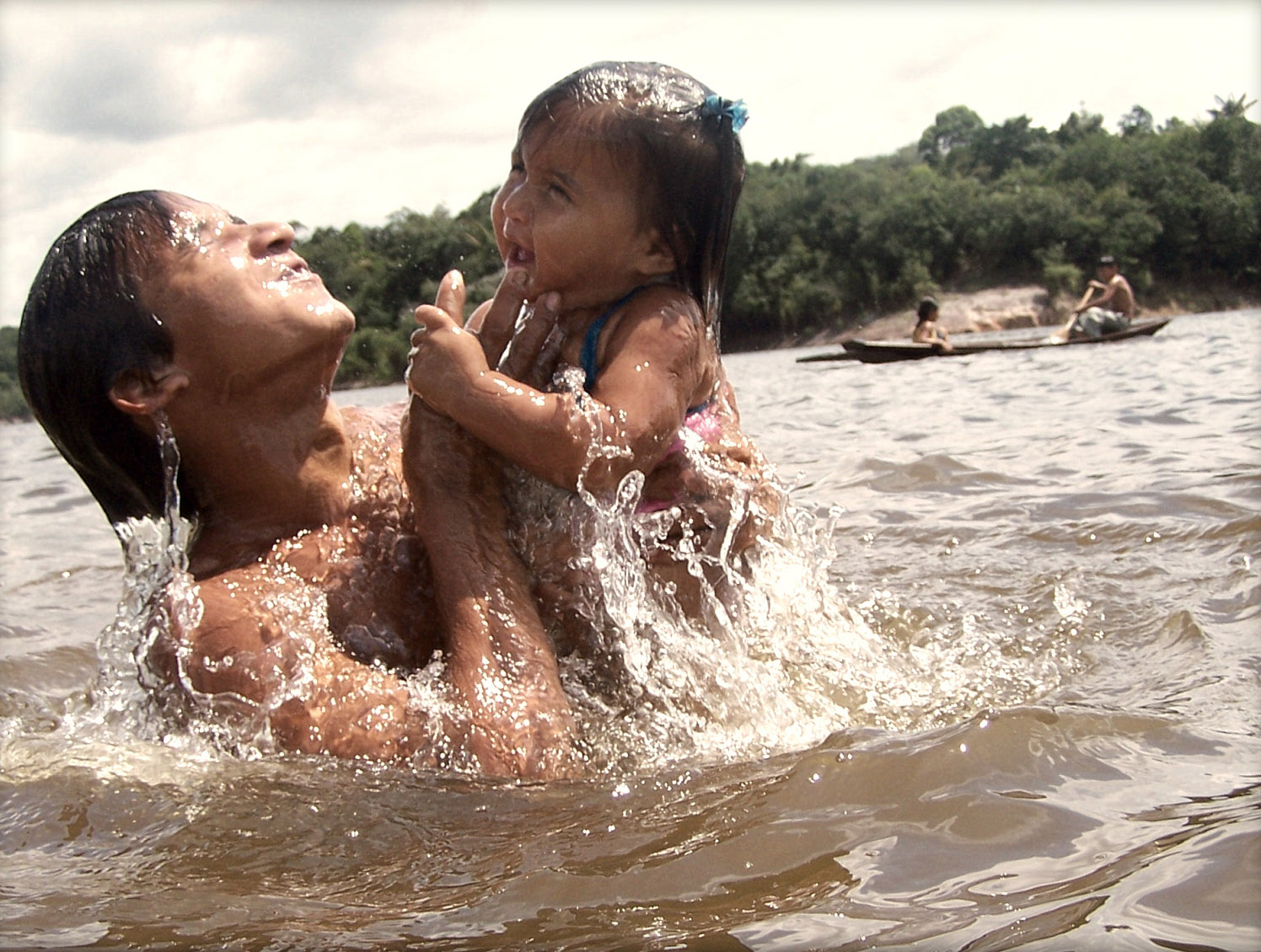
- Baré people bathing in the river

- Location within Brazil
- Native name: Rio Cuieiras (Portuguese)

Location
- Country: Brazil

Physical characteristics
- Mouth
  - location: Rio Negro
  - coordinates: 2.824315°S 60.509059°W

Basin features
- River system: Rio Negro

The Cuieiras River (Portuguese: Rio Cuieiras) is a river in the municipality of Maués, Amazonas state, Brazil.

== Location ==
The Cuieiras River is a tributary of the Rio Negro, which it enters from the left (east) upstream from Manaus in the Anavilhanas archipelago region. It defines the north boundary of the Rio Negro State Park South Section. The north bank of the river is in the Rio Negro Left Bank Environmental Protection Area, a 611,008 hectares (1,509,830 acres) sustainable use conservation area created in 1995. The forest around the river is home to the endangered Pied tamarin.

== People ==
The Aroaqui language, now extinct, may have been spoken on the banks of the Cuieiras River.

During the second half of the 20th century indigenous families from the middle Solimões River and the upper Rio Negro settled in areas on the banks of the Cuieiras and founded seven communities. The communities are ethnically diverse, including Cocama, Baniwa, Tucano, Ticuna, Mura, Baré, Sateré-Mawé and Carapana people. There is conflict with non-indigenous families. The river has been used for sand extraction, which the residents consider to be a source of pollution.

In 1996, indigenous families began to fight for regularisation of property ownership without gaining much support from the Fundação Nacional do Índio (National Indian Foundation, FUNAI).

In January 2014, FUNAI was directed to create a technical group to identify and demarcate the land and submit a final report within six months. One issue is that the residents are in the state park, as their presence was not considered when the park was established in the 1980s.

== See also ==
- List of rivers of Amazonas

== Sources ==
- APA Margem Esquerda do Rio Negro (in Portuguese), ISA: Instituto Socioambiental
- Elaíze Farias (27 January 2014), "Índios do rio Cuieiras (AM) recriam cultura e pedem demarcação", Amazônia Real (in Portuguese)
- Röhe, F. (2006), Área de contato entre as distribuições geográficas de Saguinus midas e Saguinus bicolor (Callitrichidae-Primates): a importância de interações e fatores ecológicos, Dissertação de Mestrado — INPA/UFAM
