= Novo Airão =

Municipality of Amazonas, Brazil

- Municipality
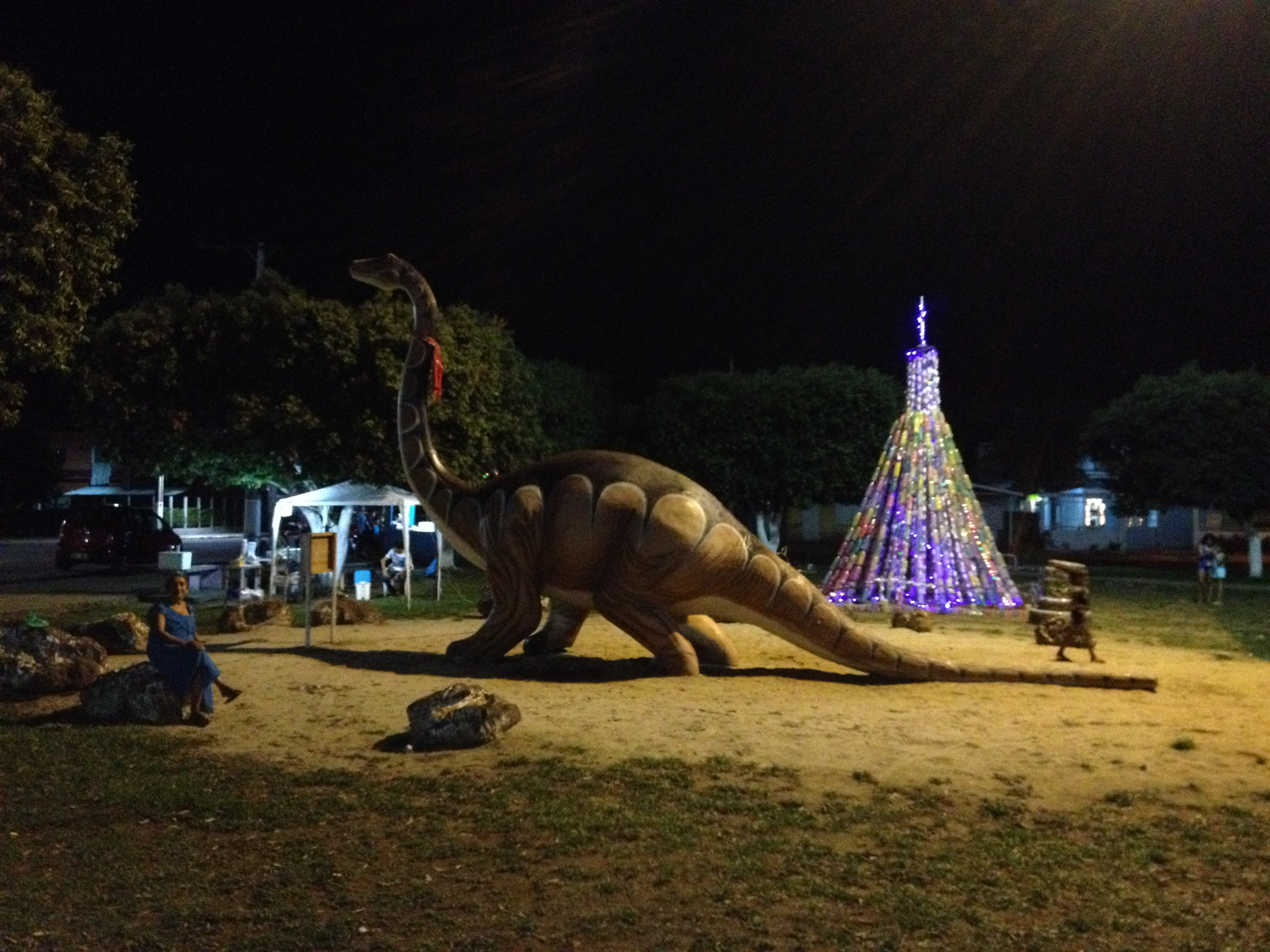

- Location of the municipality in Amazonas

- Location in Brazil
- Coordinates: 2°37′15″S 60°56′38″W
- Country: Brazil
- Region: North
- State: Amazonas

Area
  - Total: 37,771 km^{2} (14,583 sq mi)

Population (2020)
  - Total: 19,928
  - Density: 0.52760/km^{2} (1.3665/sq mi)
- Time zone: UTC−4 (AMT)

Novo Airão (or New Airão) is a municipality located in the state of Amazonas in northern Brazil on the Rio Negro River about 180 km upstream of Manaus. Its population was 19,928 (2020) and its area is 37,771 km^{2}. The town is accessible by both river and road.

== History ==
The region where New Airão now exists was originally inhabited by Indigenous people, including the Waimiri-Atroari, Crichanã, Carabinari and Jauaperi peoples. In 1668, Brazilian Jesuits founded a settlement at the mouth of the Jaú River named Santo Elias de Jau. This settlement is believed to have been the second or third nucleus of settlement organized by the Portuguese in Amazonian lands. In 1759, the village was elevated to a town with the name Airão by Joaquim de Melo Póvoas, the first governor of the captaincy of São José do Rio Negro. Later, the district around Airão became part of Manaus. When it was dissolved in 1938 it became Novo Airão (New Airão).

== Geography ==
The municipality contains part of the Anavilhanas National Park, a 350,018-hectare (864,910-acre) conservation unit that was originally an ecological station created in 1981, as well half of the Jau National Park, declared by UNESCO Natural Heritage of Humanity. It holds about 24% of the Rio Negro Left Bank Environmental Protection Area, a 611,008-hectare (1,509,830-acre) sustainable use conservation area created in 1995. It also contains the 146,028-hectare (360,840-acre) Rio Negro State Park North Section, created in 1995. To the south of the state park the municipality contains about 60% of the Rio Negro Right Bank Environmental Protection Area, a 1,140,990-hectare (2,819,400-acre) sustainable use conservation unit that controls use of an area of Amazon rainforest along the Rio Negro above the junction with the Solimões River. It also contains about 16% of the Rio Negro Sustainable Development Reserve, a 103,086-hectare (254,730-acre) sustainable use conservation unit created in 2008 in an effort to stop deforestation in the area, which is threatened due to its proximity to Manaus.

== Tourism ==
Tourists visit Novo Airão to access the surrounding area, including visiting the Anavilhanas and Jaú National Parks, and native communities, as well as feeding and/or swimming with the Amazon river dolphins, also known as pink river dolphins. The last facility is offered at a small floating café down the harbour. It is possible to hire some boatmen at the port for trips to Anavilhanas archipelago, Velho Airão (the ruins of the old town, and nearby petroglyphs), and occasionally the Jaú River. The boatmen perform sightseeing tours focused on alligators, bird watching, conduct aquatic trails, piranha fishing, wildlife observation, and visits to native communities. The Tourist Information Center (CAT) at the city's entrance provides a complete list of lodges, hostels and hotels, as well as tourism operators, which can help tourists plan trips.

Due to current bus and boat schedules, making a day trip to Novo Airão is difficult- most spend at least a night in the town. There are several potential accommodations in town, including lodges and bed and breakfasts. Buses leave from the Manaus Bus Terminal early in the morning and boats from the Port of Manaus in the evening.
