= Rio Negro Bridge =

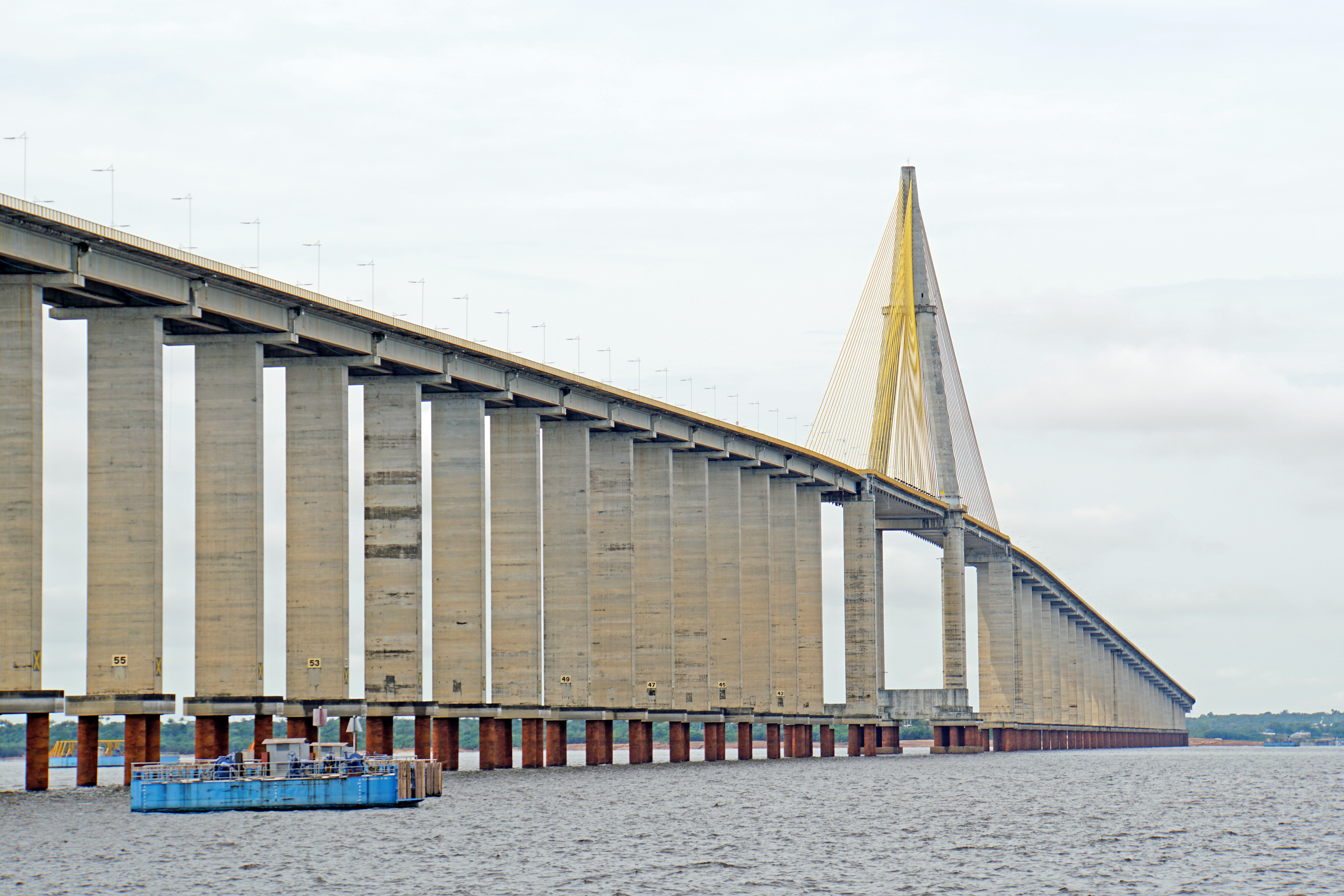
- Rio Negro Bridge, 2019.
- Coordinates: 3°7′19″S 60°04′46″W
- Carries: 4 lanes of roadway
- Crosses: Rio Negro
- Locale: Manaus and Iranduba, Amazonas, Brazil
- Official name: Journalist Phelippe Daou Bridge

Characteristics
- Design: Cable-stayed bridge
- Total length: 3,595 metres (11,795 ft)
- Height: 185 metres (607 ft)
- Longest span: 2x200 metres (660 ft)
- Clearance above: 55 metres (180 ft)

History
- Construction start: December 3, 2007
- Opened: October 24, 2011

Location
- Interactive map of Rio Negro Bridge

The Journalist Phelippe Daou Bridge (Portuguese: Ponte Rio Negro) is the fourth longest bridge in Brazil at 3,595 metres (11,795 ft) long, with a cable-stayed bridge section of 400 metres (1,300 ft), over the Rio Negro that links the city of Manaus with the small town of Iranduba in the state of Amazonas in Brazil. It spans the Rio Negro just before its confluence with the Amazon River, and is the only major bridge across the Amazon or any tributary in the Amazon basin. Its construction was marked by controversy over the potential effects of roadbuilding in the Amazon basin, which could lead to deforestation. A 2018 study found that the construction of this bridge did induce deforestation.

A quintessential bridge to nowhere, it does not connect to the south side of the Amazon River and the rest of Brazil. Its construction has raised the possibility of expansion and reconstruction of the federal highway BR-319, which links the region to Porto Velho, Rondônia. That road is on the south side of the Amazon, and so any vehicle from Manaus would still have to make a ferry connection across the main stem of the Amazon, despite the completion of the Rio Negro bridge.

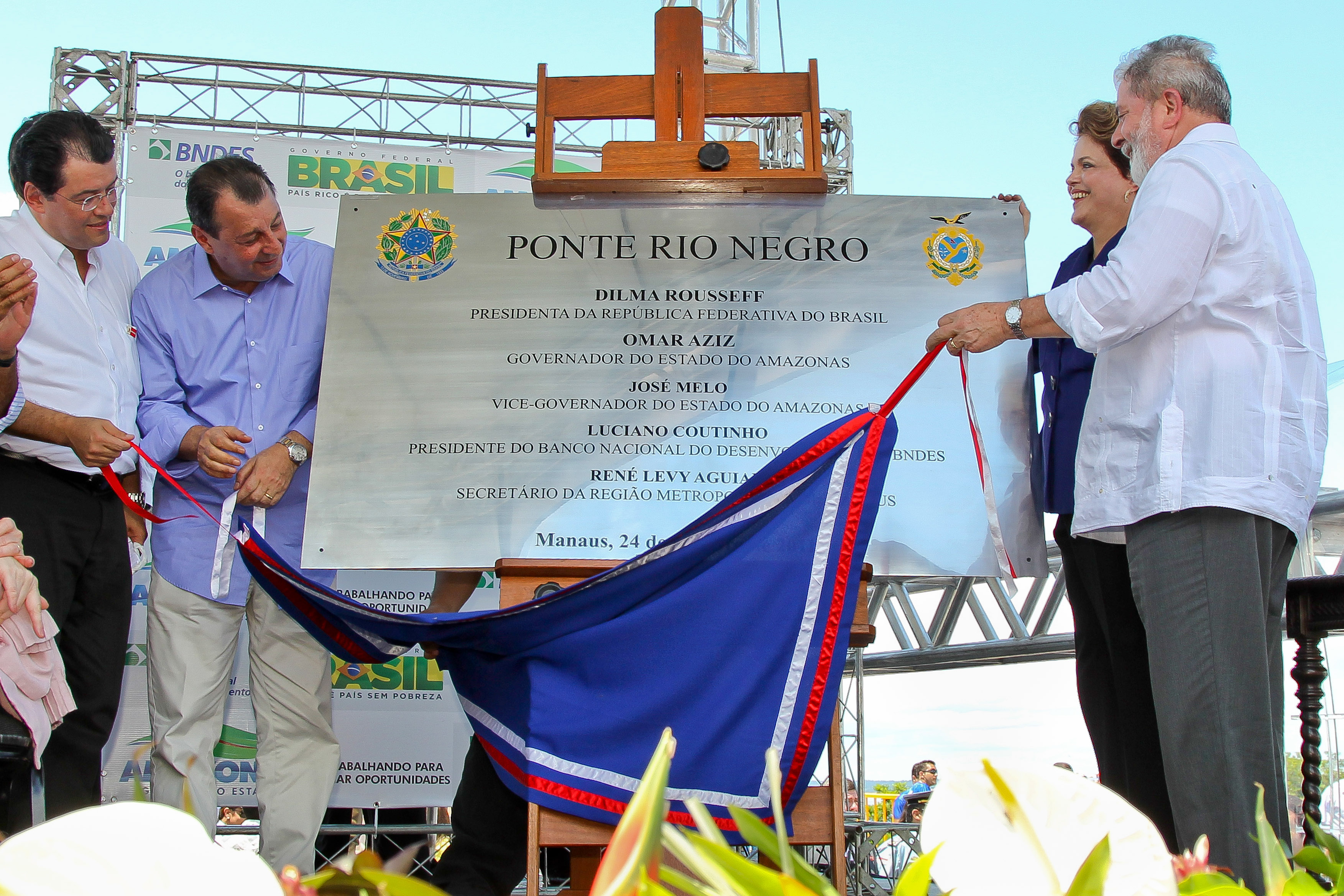
Inauguration of the bridge
