= Anavilhanas National Park =

National park in Amazonas, Brazil

Coordinates: 2°23′41″S 60°55′14″W

- Parque Nacional de Anavilhanas
- IUCN category II (national park)
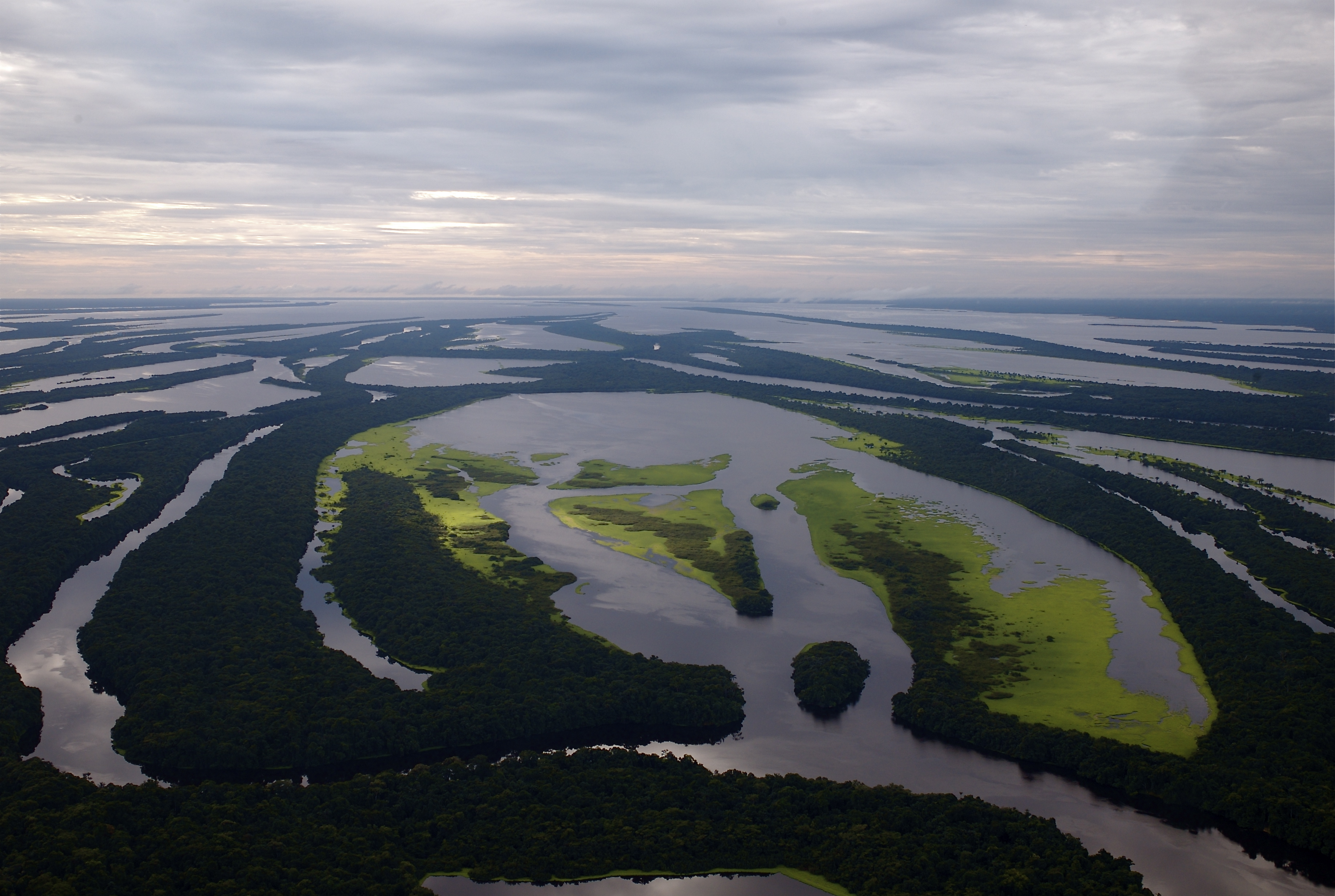
- View from the air

- Location within Brazil
- Nearest city: Manaus
- Area: 350,470 hectares (866,000 acres)
- Designation: National park
- Created: 6 February 1981

Ramsar Wetland
- Designated: 22 March 2017
- Reference no.: 2296

Anavilhanas National Park (Portuguese: Parque Nacional de Anavilhanas) is a national park that encompasses a huge river archipelago in the Rio Negro in the state of Amazonas, Brazil. It is part of a World Heritage Site.

== Location ==
South Rio Negro conservation units 10: Anavilhanas National Park

The park is in the municipalities of Manaus and Novo Airão. It is managed by the Chico Mendes Institute for Biodiversity Conservation. The fluvial part of the park, 60% of the total, has more than 400 islands. It is about 130 kilometres (81 mi) long and on average 20 kilometres (12 mi) wide, with a total area of 350,470 hectares (866,000 acres). The park is bounded to the north and east by the Rio Negro Left Bank Environmental Protection Area, a 611,008 hectares (1,509,830 acres) sustainable use conservation area created in 1995. The fluvial section extends to the west shore of the Rio Negro, which is mainly protected by the Rio Negro Right Bank Environmental Protection Area and the Rio Negro Sustainable Development Reserve.

The terrain ranges in altitude from 50 to 150 metres (160 to 490 ft) above sea level. Average annual rainfall is 2,100 millimetres (83 in). Temperatures range from 23 to 34 °C (73 to 93 °F). The park contains a variety of forest types and river and lake ecosystems.

== Conservation ==
The park was originally created on 6 February 1981 as an integral protection unit covering 350,018 hectares (864,910 acres). It was reclassified from the strictly protected ecological station to the more open (but still protected) national park status by law nº 11.799 of 29 October 2008.

The park protects the environment of the Anavilhanas river archipelago in the Rio Negro, one of the largest in the world, and its forest formations. It supports scientific research and enhances conservation of the Amazon biome through environmental education and sustainable tourism. The park is open year round. Protected species include margay (Leopardus wiedii), jaguar (Panthera onca), giant anteater (Myrmecophaga tridactyla), giant armadillo (Priodontes maximus), giant otter (Pteronura brasiliensis), Amazonian manatee (Trichechus inunguis), and Amazon river dolphin (Inia geoffrensis).

Jaú National Park was inscribed by UNESCO as a World Heritage Site in 2000. It became part of the Central Amazon Ecological Corridor, established in 2002. In 2003, the property was expanded by the addition of the Anavilhanas National Park, Amanã Sustainable Development Reserve, and Mamirauá Sustainable Development Reserve to form the Central Amazon Conservation Complex, a larger World Heritage Site. The park became part of the Lower Rio Negro Mosaic, created in 2010. The conservation unit is supported by the Amazon Region Protected Areas Program.

== Sources ==
- APA Margem Esquerda do Rio Negro (in Portuguese), ISA: Instituto Socioambiental
- CEC Central da Amazônia (in Portuguese), ISA: Instituto Socioambiental
- Central Amazon Conservation Complex, UNESCO
- Full list: PAs supported by ARPA, ARPA
- Parna de Anavilhanas (in Portuguese), Chico Mendes Institute for Biodiversity Conservation, archived from the original on 2016-03-03
- PARNA de Anavilhanas (in Portuguese), ISA: Instituto Socioambiental
- Parque Nacional de Anavilhanas (in Portuguese), ICMBio
- Thiago Mota Cardoso (2010), Depoimento: o mosaico do baixo rio Negro (in Portuguese), IPÊ-Instituto de Pesquisas Ecológicas
- Unidade de Conservação: Parque Nacional de Anavilhanas (in Portuguese), MMA: Ministério do Meio Ambiente
