= Iranduba =

Municipality of Amazonas, Brazil

- Municipality
- Municipality of Iranduba
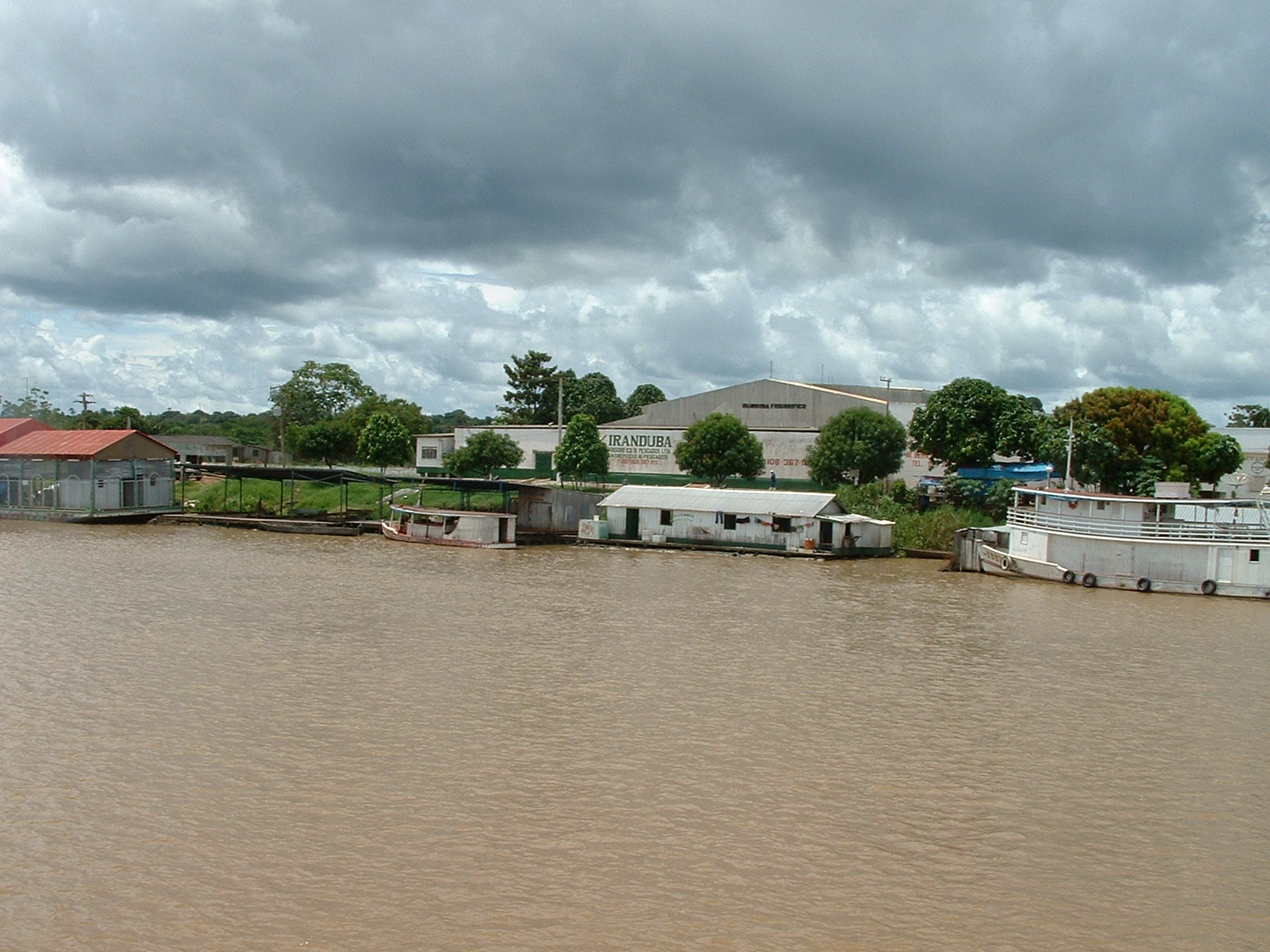
- Iranduba near Solimões River

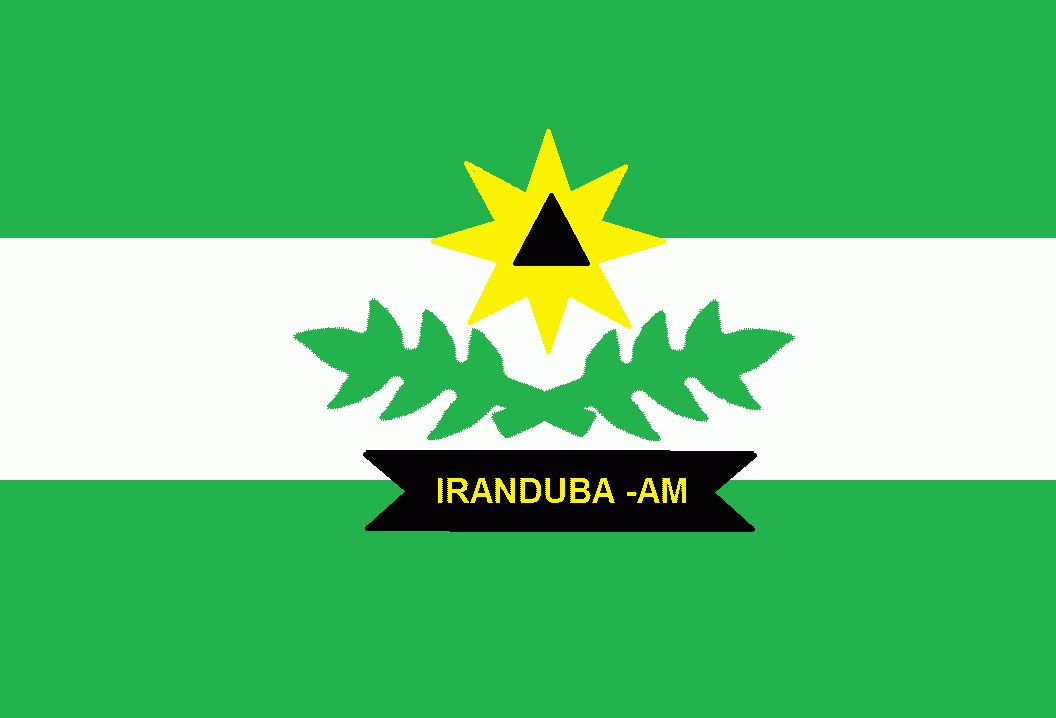
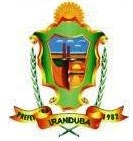
- Flag Coat of arms
- Nickname: "Cidade das Chaminés" ("City of Chimneys")
- Location of Jutaí in the State of Amazonas
- Coordinates: 03°17′06″S 60°11′09″W
- Country: Brazil
- Region: North
- State: Amazonas
- Emancipated: 1981

Government
  - Mayor: Raymundo Nonato (PMDB)

Area
  - Total: 2,215.033 km^{2} (855.229 sq mi)
- Elevation: 92 m (302 ft)

Population (2020)
  - Total: 49,011
  - Density: 18.94/km^{2} (49.1/sq mi)
- Time zone: UTC−4 (AMT)
- Area code: +55 92
- HDI (2000): 0.694 – medium
- Website: www.iranduba.am.gov.br

Iranduba is a municipality located in the Brazilian state of Amazonas.

The population of Iranduba in 2020 was 49,011 and its area is 2,215 km^{2}, making it the smallest municipality in Amazonas in terms of area.

== Geography ==
The municipality is located south and west of Manaus on the right bank of the Rio Negro and the left bank of the Solimões River. It is connected to Manaus by the Manaus Iranduba Bridge, a cable-stayed bridge which opened in 2011.

The municipality contains about 21% of the Rio Negro Right Bank Environmental Protection Area, a 1,140,990-hectare (2,819,400-acre) sustainable use conservation unit that controls use of an area of Amazon rainforest along the Rio Negro above the junction with the Solimões River. It also contains about 80% of the Rio Negro Sustainable Development Reserve, a 103,086-hectare (254,730-acre) sustainable use conservation unit created in 2008 in an effort to stop deforestation in the area, which is threatened due to its proximity to Manaus.
