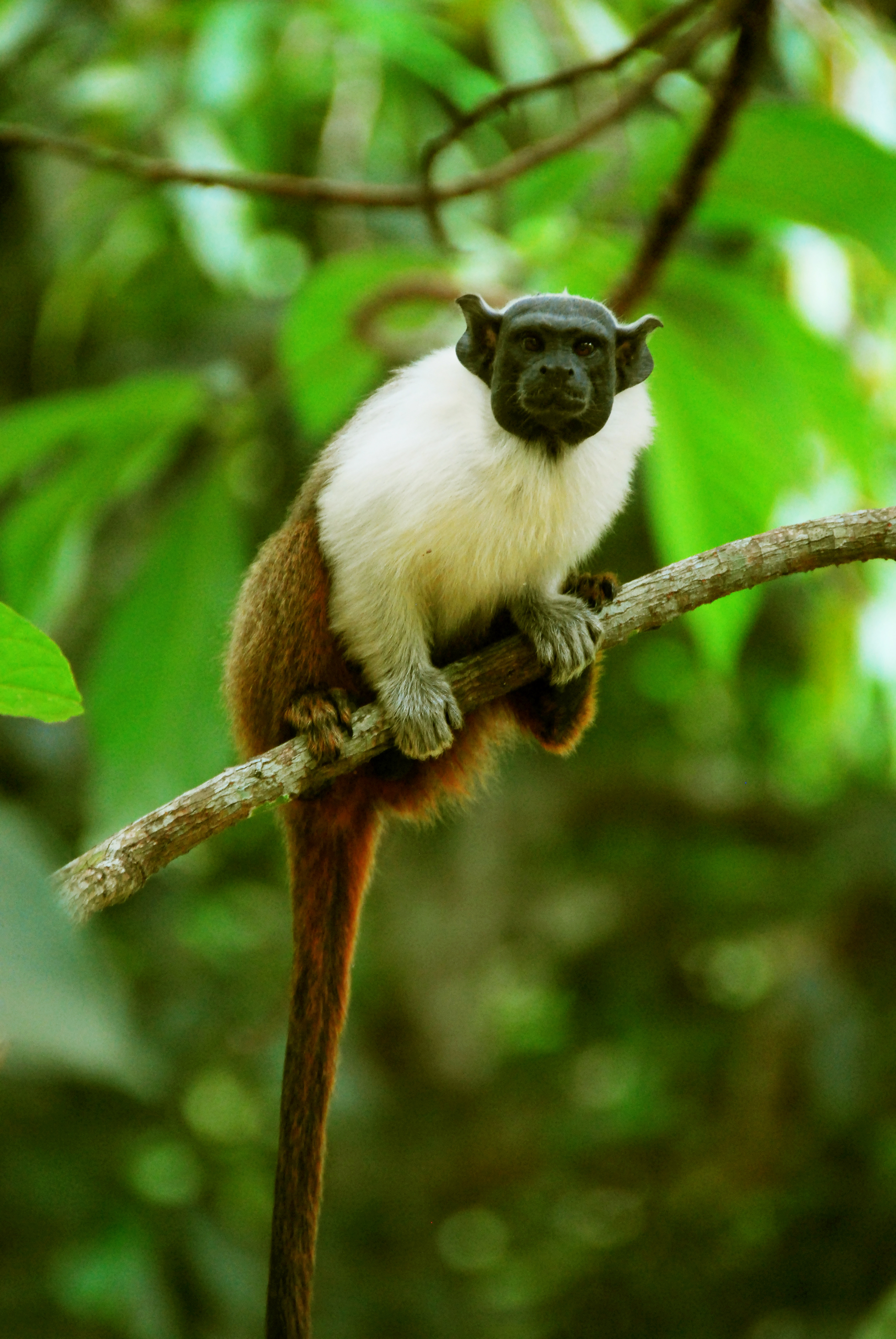
- Pied tamarin at Parque Municipal do Mindu, Brazil

Conservation status
- Critically Endangered (IUCN 3.1)
- CITES Appendix I

Scientific classification
- Kingdom: Animalia
- Phylum: Chordata
- Class: Mammalia
- Order: Primates
- Family: Callitrichidae
- Genus: Saguinus
- Species: S. bicolor

Binomial name
- Saguinus bicolor Spix, 1823
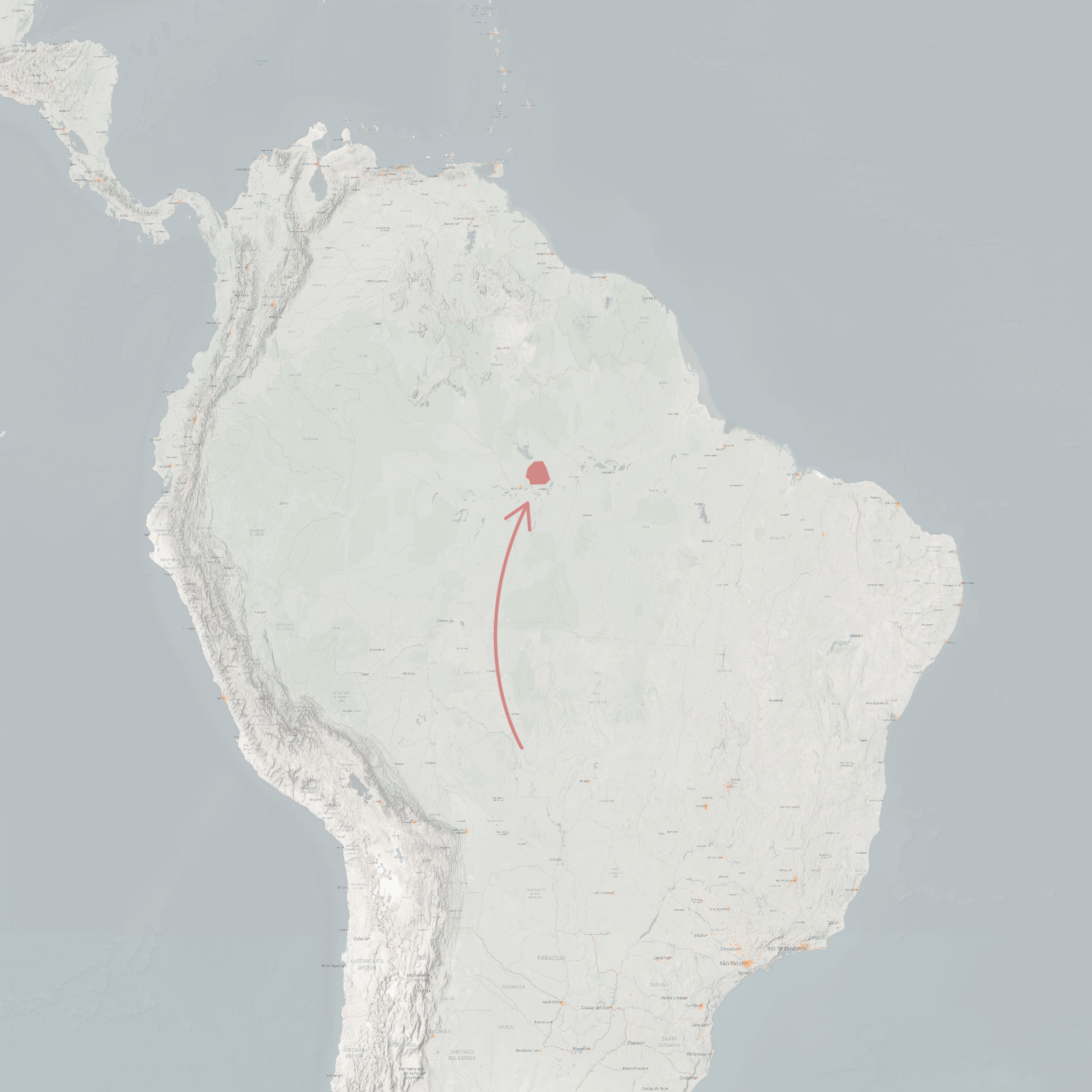
- The approximate range of the Pied Tamarin

= Pied tamarin =

Species of New World monkey

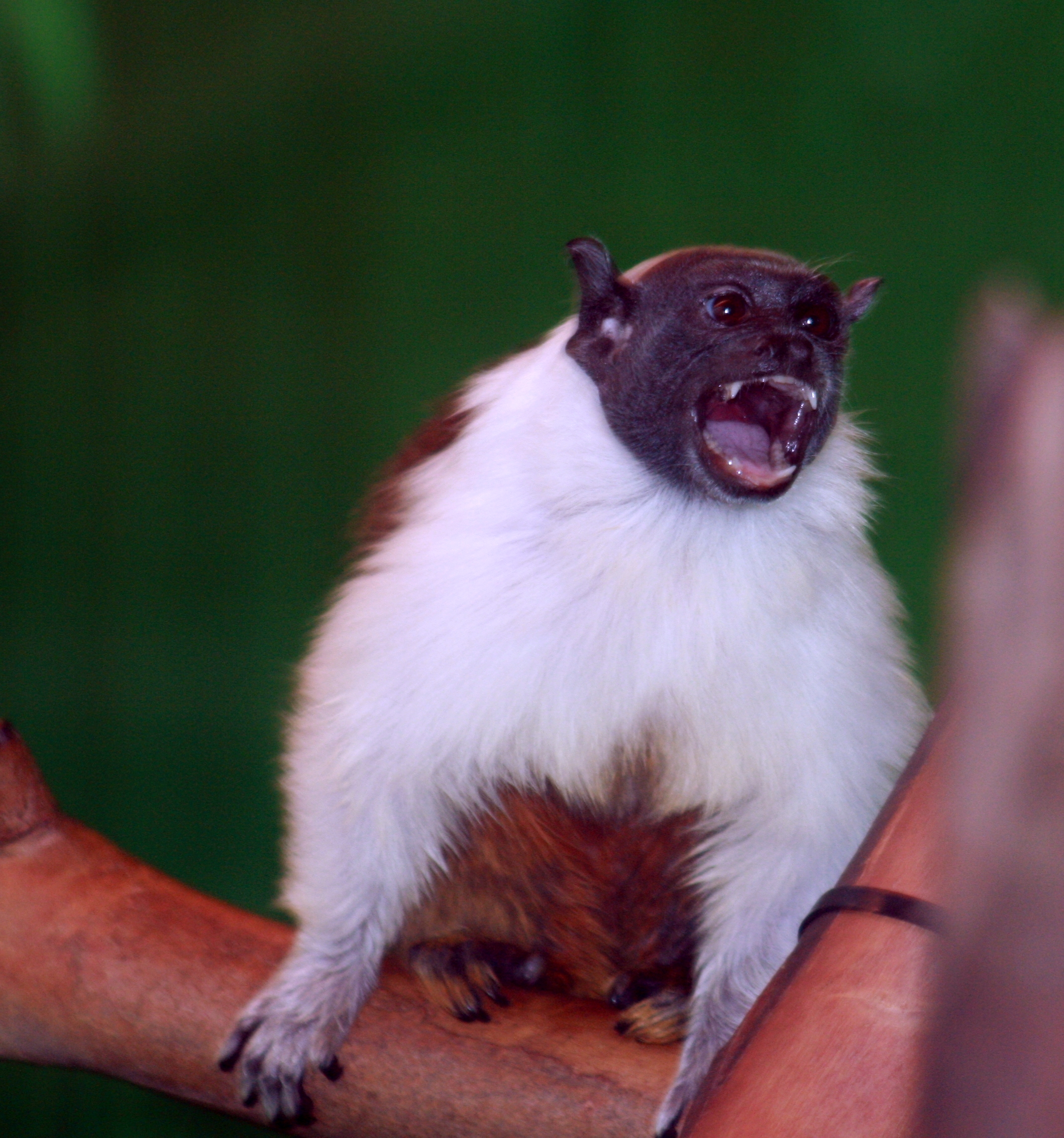
Pied tamarin in captivity

The pied tamarin (Saguinus bicolor), sometimes referred to as the Brazilian bare-faced tamarin, is a critically endangered species of primate found in a restricted area of the Brazilian Amazon rainforest. It was named the mascot of Manaus, Brazil in 2005. The species is endangered due to the increasing size of the city of Manaus, which is encroaching on their native habitat.

== Distribution and habitat ==
A New World monkey, the pied tamarin is found at the city limits of Manaus, the capital of the Amazonas state of Brazil and up to 35 km (22 mi) to the north and 100 km (62 mi) to the east. A tamarin group has a home range of 10–100 ha (25–247 acres). The main distribution is in the interfluvial areas of the Rio Cuieiras and Rio Preto da Eva. Pied tamarins are also found in the adjacent interfluvial areas of the Rio Preto da Eva and Rio Urubu, but are comparatively rare. The pied tamarin is found in old-growth forests, sand forest and smaller secondary forest fragments. Their density is higher in secondary forest fragments than in primary forest.

== Description ==
The pied tamarin does not exhibit sexual dimorphism, as both males and females weigh around 500 g (18 oz) and are roughly 28–32 cm (11–13 in) in length. Furthermore, both male and female tamarins exhibit the same coloration: they have a black furless face with a white upper body and a lower body that can range in color from a light to dark brown. Their furless face gives them the nickname "Brazilian bare-faced tamarin."

The pied tamarin does not have nails, but instead has claws that allow them to quickly scale trees in order to retrieve food or escape predators. These claws also allow the tamarin to dig into tree bark and extract sap to eat.

Its life expectancy is approximately 10 years in the wild, but can be extended to double that in captivity.

== Behavior ==
=== Diet ===
Pied tamarins are omnivorous; their diet consisting of gums, saps, fruit, flowers, nectar, insects, spiders, small vertebrates and bird eggs. During the dry season, when tree gums and saps are less available, they consume smaller animals.

Due to their omnivorous diets, pied tamarins are responsible for seed dispersal and the regulation of small animal populations such as insects and amphibians.

=== Group structure and reproduction ===
Individuals live in groups of 2 to 15 members with little intragroup competition. The average group size in the Reserva Florestal Adolpho Ducke is 4.8 individuals per group, and other areas around Manaus reported mean group sizes of 6.19. Generally, group sizes range from 2 to 15 individuals.

Pied tamarin groups are mixed, containing multiple males and females. A single dominant female is the only one in the group to reproduce, and the dominant female suppresses the estrus cycles of the other females through the release of pheromones.

=== Reproduction ===
Like other tamarin species, the pied tamarins are polyandrous, as the dominant female mates with multiple males. Due to the pheromones released by the dominant female, none of the other females in the group mate with other males. The fact that only one female per group produces offspring inhibits their population growth. The breeding period lasts from March to May. When the dominant female becomes pregnant, she usually will give birth to twins after a 120-to-195 day long gestation period.

Young tamarins are cared for primarily by the father and turned over to the mother only to nurse; however, the entire group helps with the care of the alpha female's offspring, a behavior known as alloparenting.

== Conservation ==
=== Classification ===
As of 2015, the pied tamarin is rated critically endangered by the IUCN Red List. The pied tamarin's population is expected to decline 80% by 2033 due to anthropogenic threats, competition with golden-handed tamarin (Saguinus midas), and disease. It is on the IUCN list for the top 25 most endangered primates in Brazil.

=== Causes of endangerment ===
The pied tamarins' natural predators are small cats, birds of prey, and snakes. Their habitat has been lost due to expansion of the city of Manaus. Within the Manaus area, pied tamarins are threatened by domestic and feral cats and dogs, electrocution from power lines, and the pet trade. Additionally, rural settlement and increasing livestock agriculture continue to encroach upon and degrade the pied tamarin's remaining habitat.

Interspecific competition with both the golden-handed tamarin and the red-handed tamarin has led to displacement of the pied tamarin.

=== Protection ===
The pied tamarin is protected in some parts of its range, such as in Sumaúma State Park (52 ha (130 acres)), Adolfo Ducke Forest Reserve (18,240 ha (45,100 acres)) and less than half of Puranga Conquista Sustainable Development Reserve (157,807 ha (389,950 acres)). The Centro de Instrução de Guerra na Selva (CIGS) (115,000 ha (280,000 acres)) is an important protected area for the species; however, it is not a conservation area, but a military jungle training facility, thus making the area's status uncertain.

Both European and American zoos and conservation services have allocated funding to the conservation of pied tamarin species. While there are only two areas in the world that are protected for the tamarins, and both are under 50 hectares, the conservation efforts have allowed for the reforestation of these places and the slow and uncertain return of the pied tamarin's native habitat.

There is an established captive breeding program for the pied tamarin and an official studbook. As of 2009, there are 172 pied tamarins in captivity and all are registered property of the Brazilian government. However, their captive breeding success rate is limited.

== In popular culture ==
The pied tamarin is featured as a pet in the game Super Auto Pets.
