= Amazon River =

Major river in Northern South America

Amazonian River Rio Amazonas, Río Amazonas
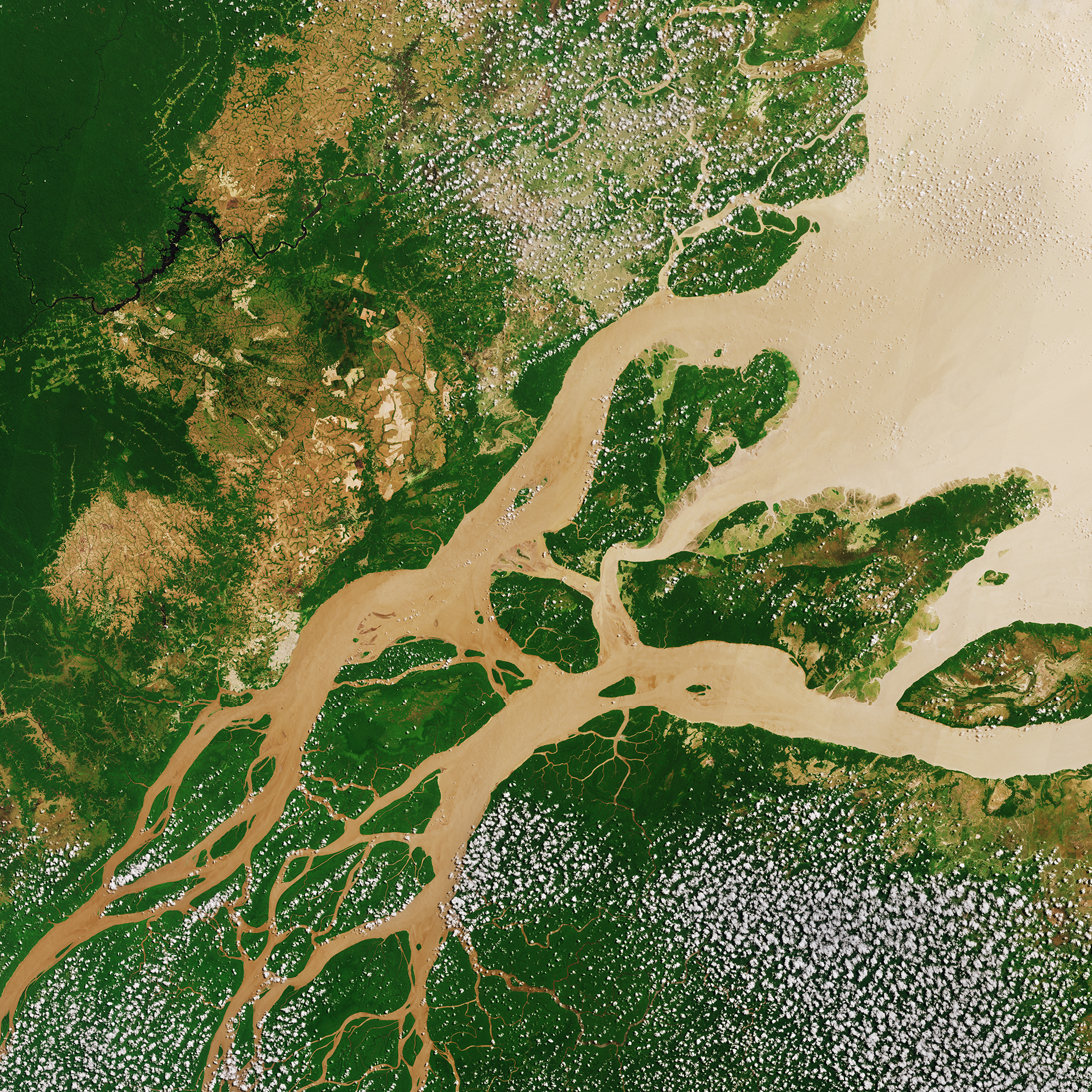
- Satellite image of the Amazon Delta

- Amazon River and its drainage basin
- Native name: Amazonas (Portuguese)

Location
- Country: Peru, Colombia, Brazil
- Cities: Iquitos (Peru); Leticia (Colombia); Tabatinga (Brazil); Tefé (Brazil); Itacoatiara (Brazil) Parintins (Brazil); Óbidos (Brazil); Santarém (Brazil); Almeirim (Brazil); Macapá (Brazil); Manaus (Brazil)

Physical characteristics
- Source: Apurímac River, Mismi Peak
  - location: Arequipa Region, Peru
  - coordinates: 15°31′04″S 71°41′37″W
  - elevation: 5,220 m (17,130 ft)
- Mouth: Atlantic Ocean
  - location: Brazil
  - coordinates: 0°42′28″N 50°5′22″W
- Length: 6,575 km (4,086 mi) (Note: Confluence of Marañón and Ucayali rivers to mouth 3,750 km (2,330 mi).: Amazon–Ucayali–Tambo–Ené–Apurímac–Hornillos 6,575 km (4,086 mi); Amazon–Marañón 5,700 km (3,500 mi); The length of the Amazon River is usually said to be "at least" 6,400 km (4,000 mi), but reported values lie anywhere between 6,275 and 7,025 km (3,899 and 4,365 mi).; The length measurements of many rivers are only approximations and differ from each other because many factors determine the calculated river length, such as the position of the geographical source and the mouth, the scale of measurement, and the length measuring techniques (for details see also List of rivers by length).)
- Basin size: 6,925,674 km^{2} (2,674,018 mi^{2}) (Note: Entire Amazon–Tocantins basin (6,743,000–7,050,000 km^{2} (2,603,000–2,722,000 mi^{2}). Amazon without Tocantins 5,956,000–6,112,000 km^{2} (2,300,000–2,360,000 mi^{2}))
- Width
  - minimum: 700 m (2,300 ft) (Upper Amazon); 1.5 km (0.93 mi) (Itacoatiara, Lower Amazon)
  - average: 3 km (1.9 mi) (Middle Amazon); 5 km (3.1 mi) (Lower Amazon)
  - maximum: 10–14 km (6.2–8.7 mi) (Lower Amazon); 340 km (210 mi) (estuary)
- Depth
  - average: 15–45 m (49–148 ft) (Middle Amazon); 20–50 m (66–164 ft) (Lower Amazon)
  - maximum: 150 m (490 ft) (Itacoatiara); 130 m (430 ft) (Óbidos)
- Discharge
  - location: Amazon Delta
  - average: 223,700 m^{3}/s (7,900,000 cu ft/s) (Note: Amazon without Tocantins 206,000–215,000 m^{3}/s (7,300,000–7,600,000 cu ft/s) and 209,000 m³/s (1973–1990); The Rio Pará is a tidally influenced estuary south of the Amazon River and Marajó Island. From the mouth of the Anapu River and the Furo do Tajapuru Channel (Amazon branch) to the Atlantic Ocean, it is about 350 km long. From the mouth of the Tocantins River, it is called the Marajó Bay. The Rio Pará estuary receives a significant amount of water from the north through the Amazon River. Some scientists advocate classifying it as part of the Amazon basin, since a significant amount of water (on average 6,000 m³/s) enters the system from the Amazon. If Amazon with Rio Pará considered as a water system, the catchment area is 6,925,674 km², the total discharge averages at Amazon Delta 223,700 m³/s (or 220,800 m³/s for the period 1973–1990; 230,000 m³/s for the period 2003–2015).)
  - minimum: 83,400 m^{3}/s (2,950,000 cu ft/s)
  - maximum: 329,500 m^{3}/s (11,640,000 cu ft/s)
- Discharge
  - location: Santarém
  - average: 188,600 m^{3}/s (6,660,000 cu ft/s)
  - minimum: 76,500 m^{3}/s (2,700,000 cu ft/s)
  - maximum: 271,100 m^{3}/s (9,570,000 cu ft/s)
- Discharge
  - location: Óbidos
  - average: 172,100 m^{3}/s (6,080,000 cu ft/s) (Note: (Period: 1903–2023) 165,829.6 m^{3}/s (5,856,220 cu ft/s) (Period: 1971–2000) 173,272.6 m^{3}/s (6,119,060 cu ft/s) (Period: 1928–1996) 176,177 m^{3}/s (6,221,600 cu ft/s) (Period: 1997–2015) 178,193.9 m^{3}/s (6,292,860 cu ft/s))
  - minimum: 71,700 m^{3}/s (2,530,000 cu ft/s)
  - maximum: 241,200 m^{3}/s (8,520,000 cu ft/s)
- Discharge
  - location: Manacapuru
  - average: 102,600 m^{3}/s (3,620,000 cu ft/s)
  - minimum: 58,800 m^{3}/s (2,080,000 cu ft/s)
  - maximum: 139,000 m^{3}/s (4,900,000 cu ft/s)
- Discharge
  - location: Tamshiyaçu
  - average: 31,700 m^{3}/s (1,120,000 cu ft/s)
  - minimum: 16,400 m^{3}/s (580,000 cu ft/s)
  - maximum: 46,700 m^{3}/s (1,650,000 cu ft/s)

Basin features
- River system: Amazon River
- Tributaries
  - left: Marañón, Nanay, Napo, Putumayo, Japurá, Badajós, Manacapuru, Rio Negro, Urubu, Uatumã, Nhamundá, Trombetas, Maicurú, Curuá, Paru, Jari
  - right: Ucayali, Jandiatuba, Javary, Jutaí, Juruá, Tefé, Coari, Purús, Madeira, Paraná do Ramos, Tapajós, Curuá-Una, Xingu, Pará, Tocantins, Acará, Guamá

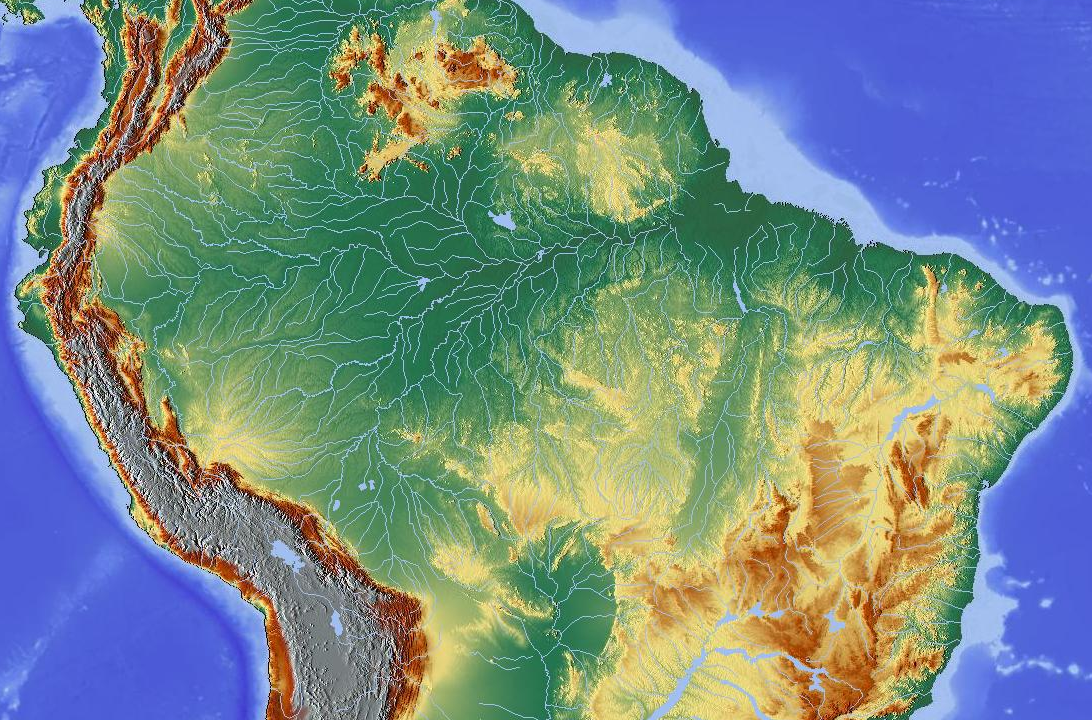
Topography of the Amazon River Basin

The Amazon River (Note: UK: /ˈæməzən/ US: /ˈæməˌzɒn/ Portuguese: rio Amazonas Spanish: río Amazonas) in South America is the largest river in the world by discharge volume of water, and the second-longest or longest river system in the world, a title which is disputed with the Nile. (Note: The Nile is usually said to be the longest river in the world, with a length of about 6,650 km (4,130 mi), and the Amazon the second longest river in the world, with a length of at least 6,400 km (4,000 mi). In 2007 and 2008, some scientists claimed that the Amazon has a length of 6,992 km (4,345 mi) and was longer than the Nile, whose length was calculated as 6,853 km (4,258 mi). A peer-reviewed article, published in 2009, states a length of 7,088 km (4,404 mi) for the Nile and 6,575 km (4,086 mi) for the Amazon, measured by using a combination of satellite image analysis and field investigations to the source regions. According to the Encyclopædia Britannica, as of 2020, the length of the Amazon remains open to interpretation and continued debate.)

For nearly a century, the headwaters of the Apurímac River on Nevado Mismi in Peru had been considered the Amazon basin's most distant source, until a 2014 study found the farthest source to be the headwaters of the Mantaro River on the Cordillera Rumi Cruz in Peru. The Mantaro and Apurímac rivers join, and with other tributaries form the Ucayali River, which in turn meets the Marañón River upstream of Iquitos, Peru, forming what countries other than Brazil consider to be the main stem of the Amazon. Brazilians call this section the Solimões River above its confluence with the Rio Negro forming what Brazilians call the Amazon at the Meeting of Waters (Portuguese: Encontro das Águas) at Manaus, the largest city on the river.

The Amazon River has an average discharge of about 215,000 to 230,000 cubic meters per second (7,600,000 to 8,100,000 cu ft/s)—approximately 6,591 to 7,570 cubic kilometers (1,581 to 1,816 cu mi) per year, greater than the next seven largest independent rivers combined. Two of the top ten rivers by discharge are tributaries of the Amazon river. The Amazon represents 20% of the global riverine discharge into oceans. The Amazon basin is the largest drainage basin in the world, with an area of approximately 7,000,000 square kilometers (2,700,000 sq mi). The portion of the river's drainage basin in Brazil alone is larger than any other river's basin. The Amazon enters Brazil with only one-fifth of the flow it finally discharges into the Atlantic Ocean yet already has a greater flow at this point than the discharge of any other river in the world. It has a recognized length of 6,400 kilometers (4,000 mi), but according to some reports, its length varies from 6,575 to 7,062 kilometers (4,086 to 4,388 mi).

== Etymology ==
The Amazon was initially known by Europeans as the Marañón, and the Peruvian part of the river is still known by that name, as well as the Brazilian state of Maranhão, which contains part of the Amazon. It later became known as Rio Amazonas in Spanish and Portuguese.

The name Rio Amazonas was reportedly given after native warriors attacked a 16th-century expedition by Francisco de Orellana. The warriors were led by women, reminding de Orellana of the Amazon warriors, a tribe of women warriors related to Iranian Scythians and Sarmatians mentioned in Greek mythology. The word Amazon itself may be derived from the Iranian compound * ha-maz-an- "(one) fighting together" or ethnonym * ha-mazan- "warriors", a word attested indirectly through a derivation, a denominal verb in Hesychius of Alexandria's gloss "ἁμαζακάραν· πολεμεῖν. Πέρσαι" ("hamazakaran: 'to make war' in Persian"), where it appears together with the Indo-Iranian root * kar- "make" (from which Sanskrit karma is also derived).

== History ==
=== Geological history ===
Geological studies suggest that for millions of years, the Amazon River flowed in the opposite direction – from east to west. Eventually the Andes Mountains formed, blocking its flow to the Pacific Ocean and causing it to switch directions to its current mouth in the Atlantic Ocean.

=== Pre-Columbian era ===
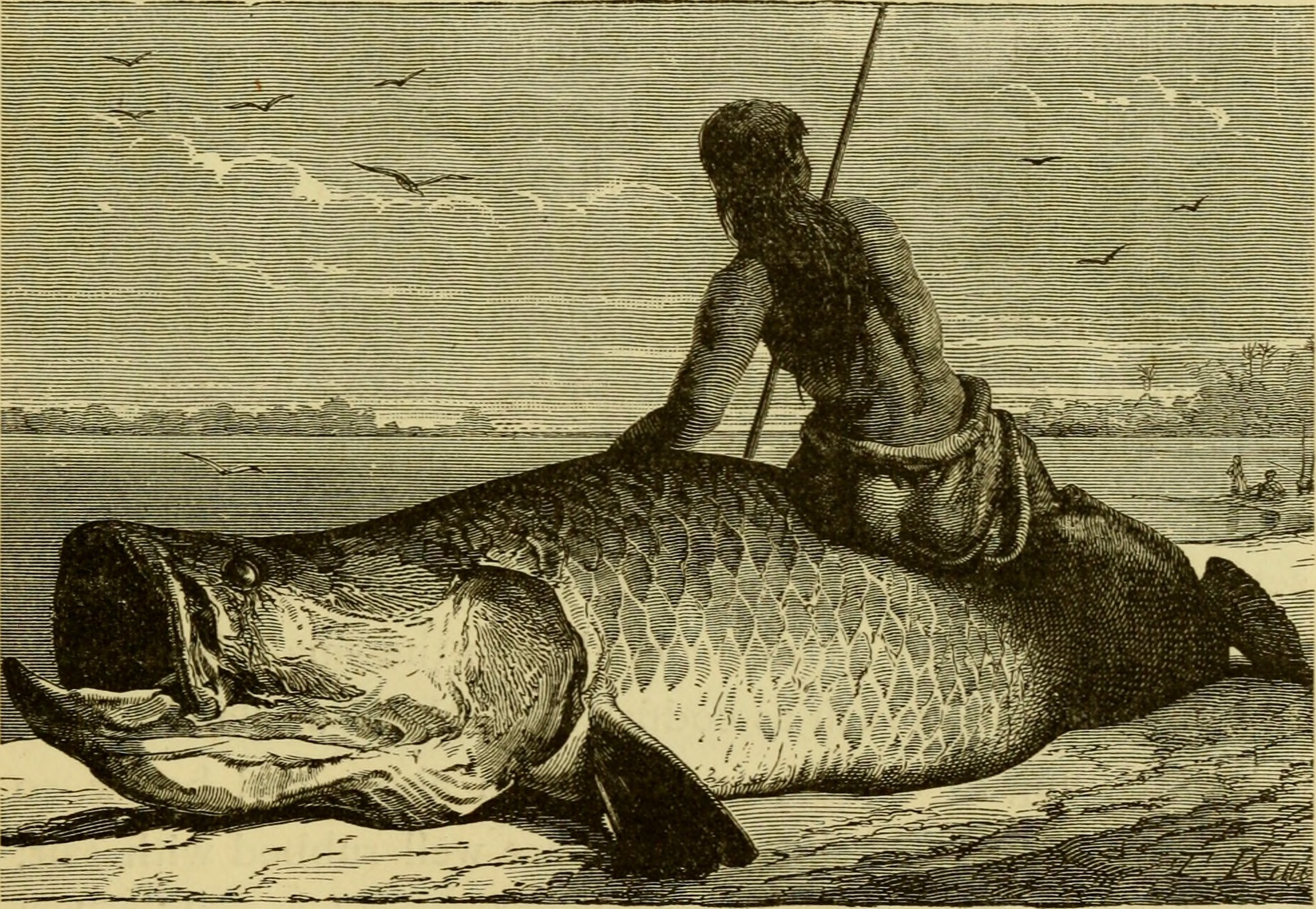
Old drawing (from 1879) of Arapaima fishing at the Amazon River. The arapaima has been on Earth for at least 23 million years.

During what many archaeologists called the formative stage, Amazonian societies were deeply involved in the emergence of South America's highland agrarian systems. The trade with Andean civilizations in the terrains of the headwaters in the Andes formed an essential contribution to the social and religious development of higher-altitude civilizations like the Muisca and Incas. Early human settlements were typically based on low-lying hills or mounds.

Shell mounds were the earliest evidence of habitation; they represent piles of human refuse and are mainly dated between 7500 BC and 4000 BC. They are associated with ceramic age cultures; no preceramic shell mounds have been documented so far by archaeologists. Artificial earth platforms for entire villages are the second type of mounds. They are best represented by the Marajoara culture. Figurative mounds are the most recent types of occupation.

There is ample evidence that the areas surrounding the Amazon River were home to complex and large-scale indigenous societies, mainly chiefdoms who developed towns and cities. Archaeologists estimate that by the time the Spanish conquistador De Orellana traveled across the Amazon in 1541, more than 3 million indigenous people lived around the Amazon. These pre-Columbian settlements created highly developed civilizations. For instance, pre-Columbian indigenous people on the island of Marajó may have developed social stratification and supported a population of 100,000 people. To achieve this level of development, the indigenous inhabitants of the Amazon rainforest altered the forest's ecology by selective cultivation and the use of fire. Scientists argue that by burning areas of the forest repeatedly, the indigenous people caused the soil to become richer in nutrients. This created dark soil areas known as terra preta de índio ("Indian black earth"). Because of the terra preta, indigenous communities were able to make land fertile and thus sustainable for the large-scale agriculture needed to support their large populations and complex social structures. Further research has hypothesized that this practice began around 11,000 years ago. Some say that its effects on forest ecology and regional climate explain the otherwise inexplicable band of lower rainfall through the Amazon basin.

Many indigenous tribes engaged in constant warfare. According to James S. Olson, "The Munduruku expansion (in the 18th century) dislocated and displaced the Kawahíb, breaking the tribe down into much smaller groups ... [Munduruku] first came to the attention of Europeans in 1770 when they began a series of widespread attacks on Brazilian settlements along the Amazon River."

=== Arrival of Europeans ===
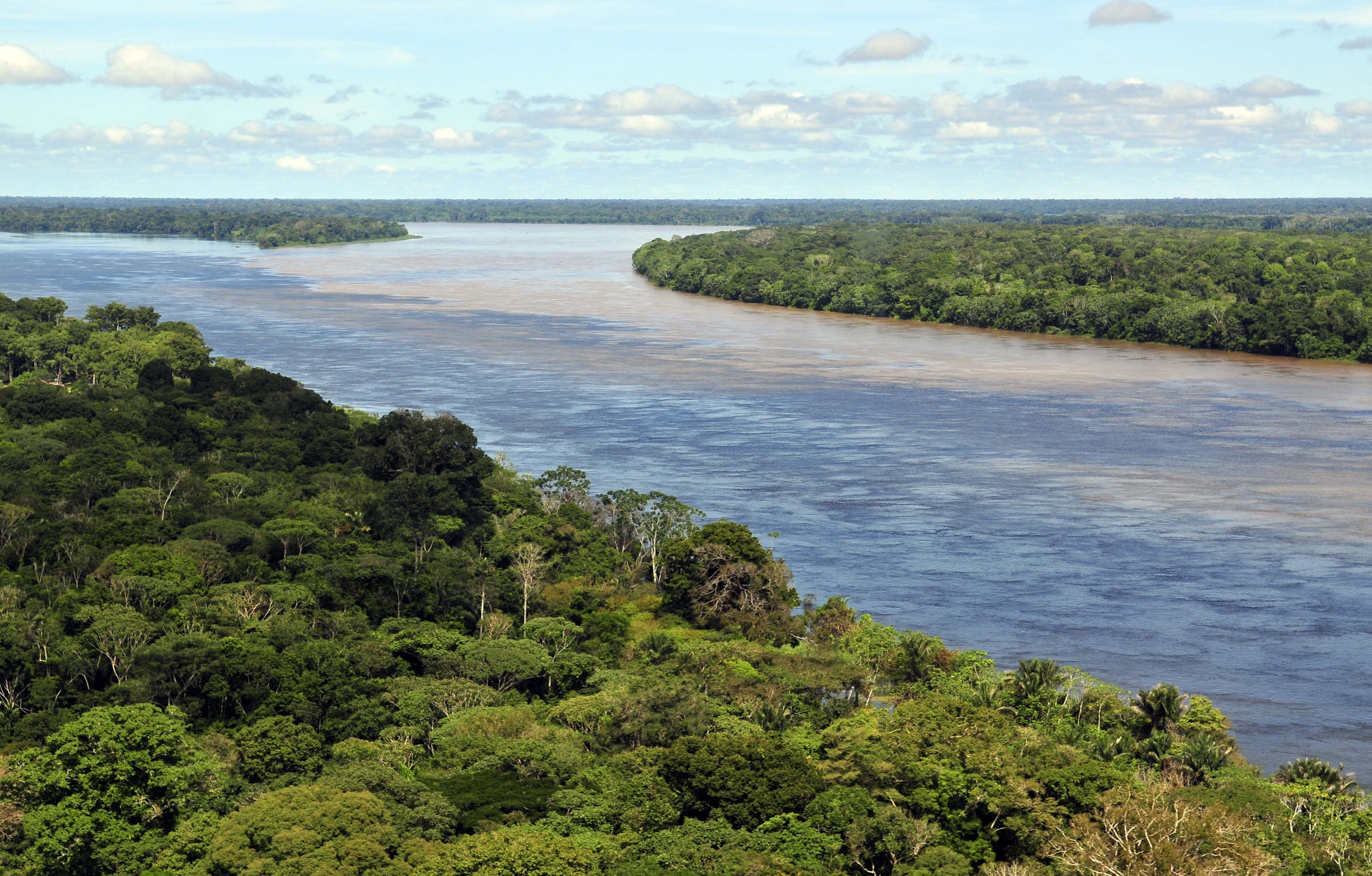
Amazon tributaries near Manaus

In March 1500, Spanish conquistador Vicente Yáñez Pinzón was the first documented European to sail up the Amazon River. Pinzón called the stream Río Santa María del Mar Dulce, later shortened to Mar Dulce, literally, sweet sea, because of its freshwater pushing out into the ocean. Another Spanish explorer, Francisco de Orellana, made the first known transit from the origins of the upstream river basins, situated in the Andes, to the mouth of the river. In this journey, Orellana baptized some of the affluents of the Amazonas like the Rio Negro, Napo and Jurua. The name Amazonas is thought to be taken from the native warriors, mostly women, whose attack on this expedition reminded De Orellana of the mythical female Amazon warriors from the ancient Hellenic culture in Greece (see also Origin of the name).

=== Exploration ===
Samuel Fritz's 1707 map showing the Amazon and the Orinoco

Gonzalo Pizarro set off in 1541 to explore east of Quito into the South American interior in search of El Dorado, the "city of gold" and La Canela, the "valley of cinnamon". He was accompanied by his second-in-command Francisco de Orellana. After 170 km (106 mi), the Coca River joined the Napo River (at a point now known as Puerto Francisco de Orellana); the party stopped for a few weeks to build a boat just upriver from this confluence. They continued downriver through an uninhabited area, where they could not find food. Orellana offered and was ordered to follow the Napo River, then known as Río de la Canela ("Cinnamon River"), and return with food for the party. Based on intelligence received from a captive native chief named Delicola, they expected to find food within a few days downriver by ascending another river to the north.

De Orellana took about 57 men, the boat, and some canoes and left Pizarro's troops on 26 December 1541. However, De Orellana missed the confluence (probably with the Aguarico) where he was searching supplies for his men. By the time he and his men reached another village, many of them were sick from hunger and eating "noxious plants", and near death. Seven men died in that village. His men threatened to mutiny if the expedition turned back to attempt to rejoin Pizarro, the party being over 100 leagues downstream at this point. He accepted to change the purpose of the expedition to discover new lands in the name of the king of Spain, and the men built a larger boat in which to navigate downstream. After a journey of 600 km (370 mi) down the Napo River, they reached a further major confluence, at a point near modern Iquitos, and then followed the upper Amazon, now known as the Solimões, for a further 1,200 km (750 mi) to its confluence with the Rio Negro (near modern Manaus), which they reached on 3 June 1542.

Regarding the initial mission of finding cinnamon, Pizarro reported to the king that they had found cinnamon trees, but that they could not be profitably harvested. True cinnamon (Cinnamomum Verum) is not native to South America. Other related cinnamon-containing plants (of the family Lauraceae) are fairly common in that part of the Amazon and Pizarro probably saw some of these. The expedition reached the mouth of the Amazon on 24 August 1542, demonstrating the practical navigability of the Great River.

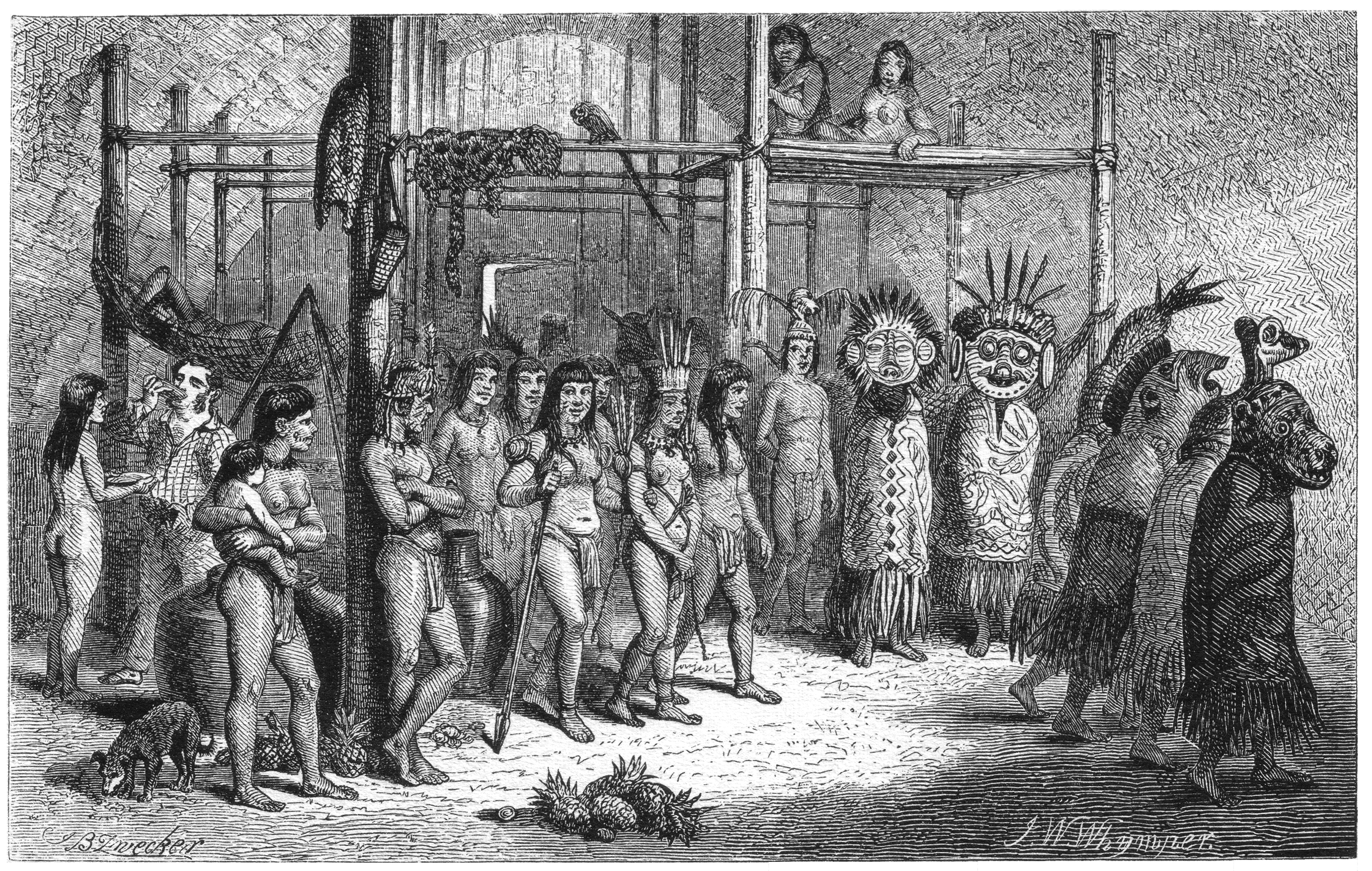
Masked-dance, and wedding-feast of Ticuna Indians, engravings for Bates's 1863 The Naturalist on the River Amazons

In 1560, another Spanish conquistador, Lope de Aguirre, may have made the second descent of the Amazon. Historians are uncertain whether the river he descended was the Amazon or the Orinoco River, which runs more or less parallel to the Amazon further north.

Portuguese explorer Pedro Teixeira was the first European to travel up the entire river. He arrived in Quito in 1637, and returned via the same route.

From 1648 to 1652, Portuguese Brazilian bandeirante António Raposo Tavares led an expedition from São Paulo overland to the mouth of the Amazon, investigating many of its tributaries, including the Rio Negro, and covering a distance of over 10,000 km (6,200 mi).

In what is currently in Brazil, Ecuador, Bolivia, Colombia, Peru, and Venezuela, several colonial and religious settlements were established along the banks of primary rivers and tributaries for trade, slaving , and evangelization among the indigenous peoples of the vast rainforest, such as the Urarina. In the late 1600s, Czech Jesuit Father Samuel Fritz, an apostle of the Omagus established some forty mission villages. Fritz proposed that the Marañón River must be the source of the Amazon, noting on his 1707 map that the Marañón "has its source on the southern shore of a lake that is called Lauricocha, near Huánuco." Fritz reasoned that the Marañón is the largest river branch one encounters when journeying upstream, and lies farther to the west than any other tributary of the Amazon. For most of the 18th–19th centuries and into the 20th century, the Marañón was generally considered the source of the Amazon.

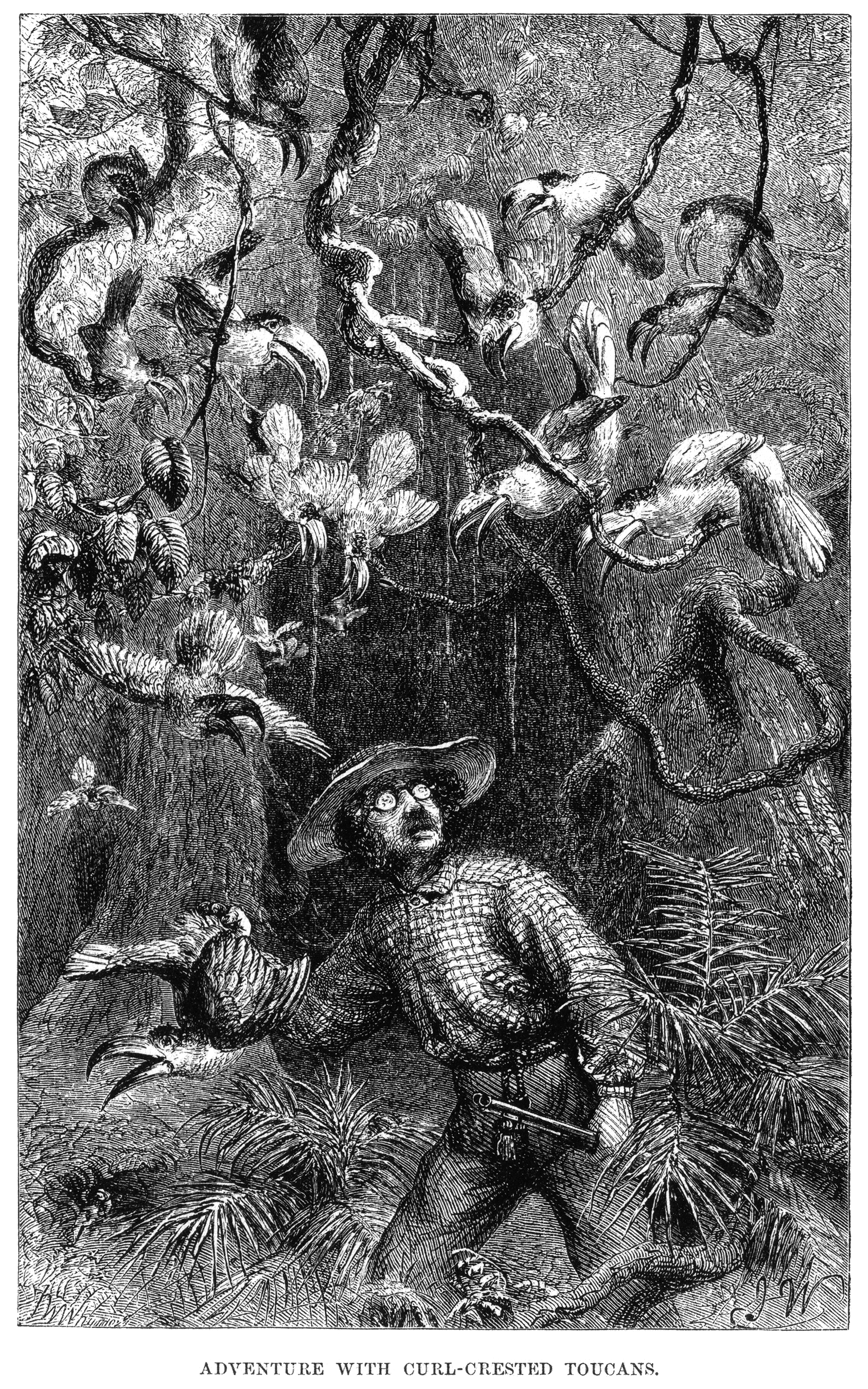
Henry Walter Bates was most famous for his expedition to the Amazon (1848–1859).

=== Scientific exploration ===
Early scientific, zoological, and botanical exploration of the Amazon River and basin took place from the 18th century through the first half of the 19th century.

- Charles Marie de La Condamine explored the river in 1743.
- Alexander von Humboldt, 1799–1804
- Johann Baptist von Spix and Carl Friedrich Philipp von Martius, 1817–1820
- Georg von Langsdorff, 1826–1828
- Henry Walter Bates and Alfred Russel Wallace, 1848–1859
- Richard Spruce, 1849–1864

=== Post-colonial exploitation and settlement ===
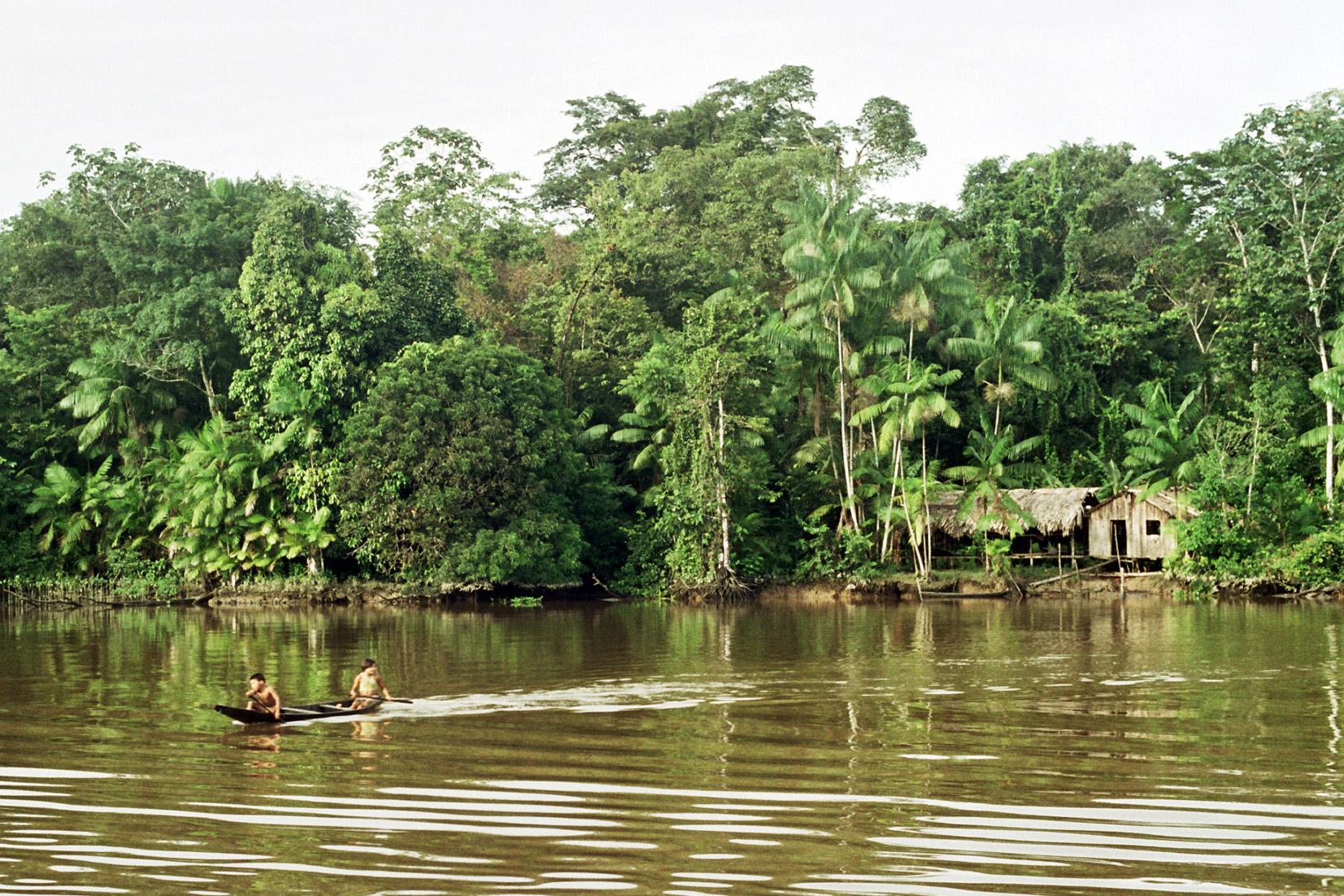
Amazonas state

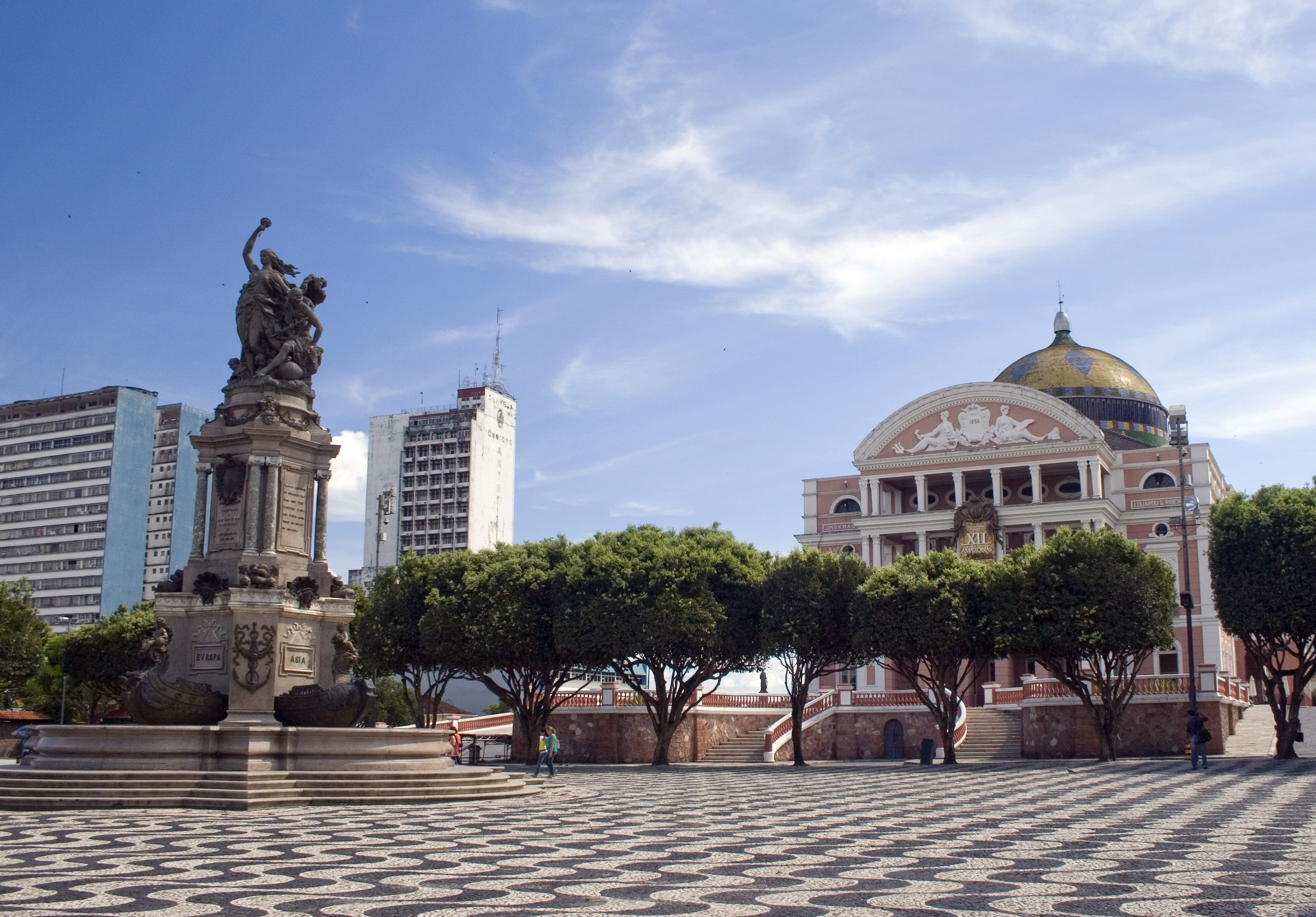
Amazon Theatre opera house in Manaus built in 1896 during the rubber boom

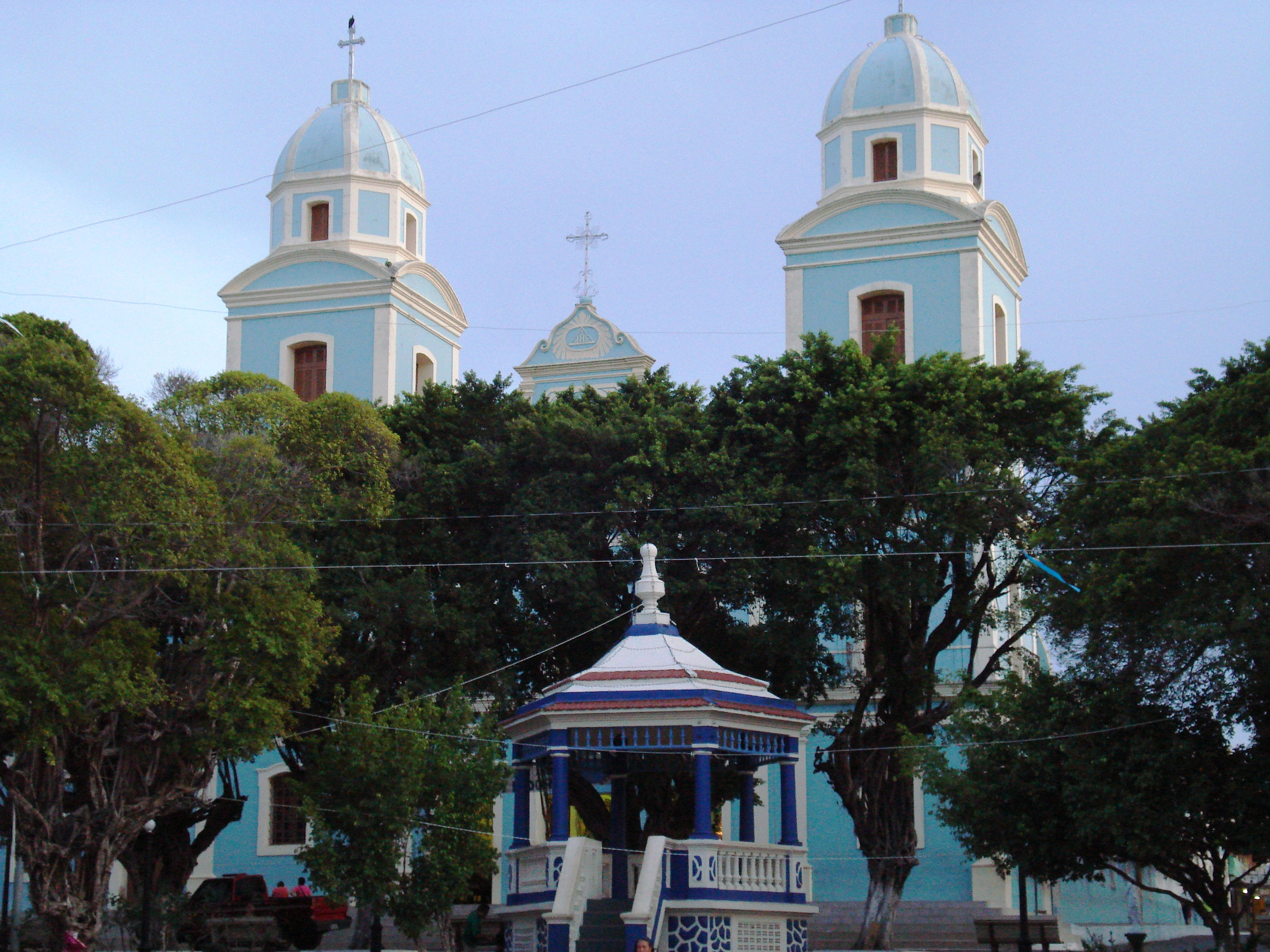
Metropolitan Cathedral of Santarém, in Santarém, Brazil

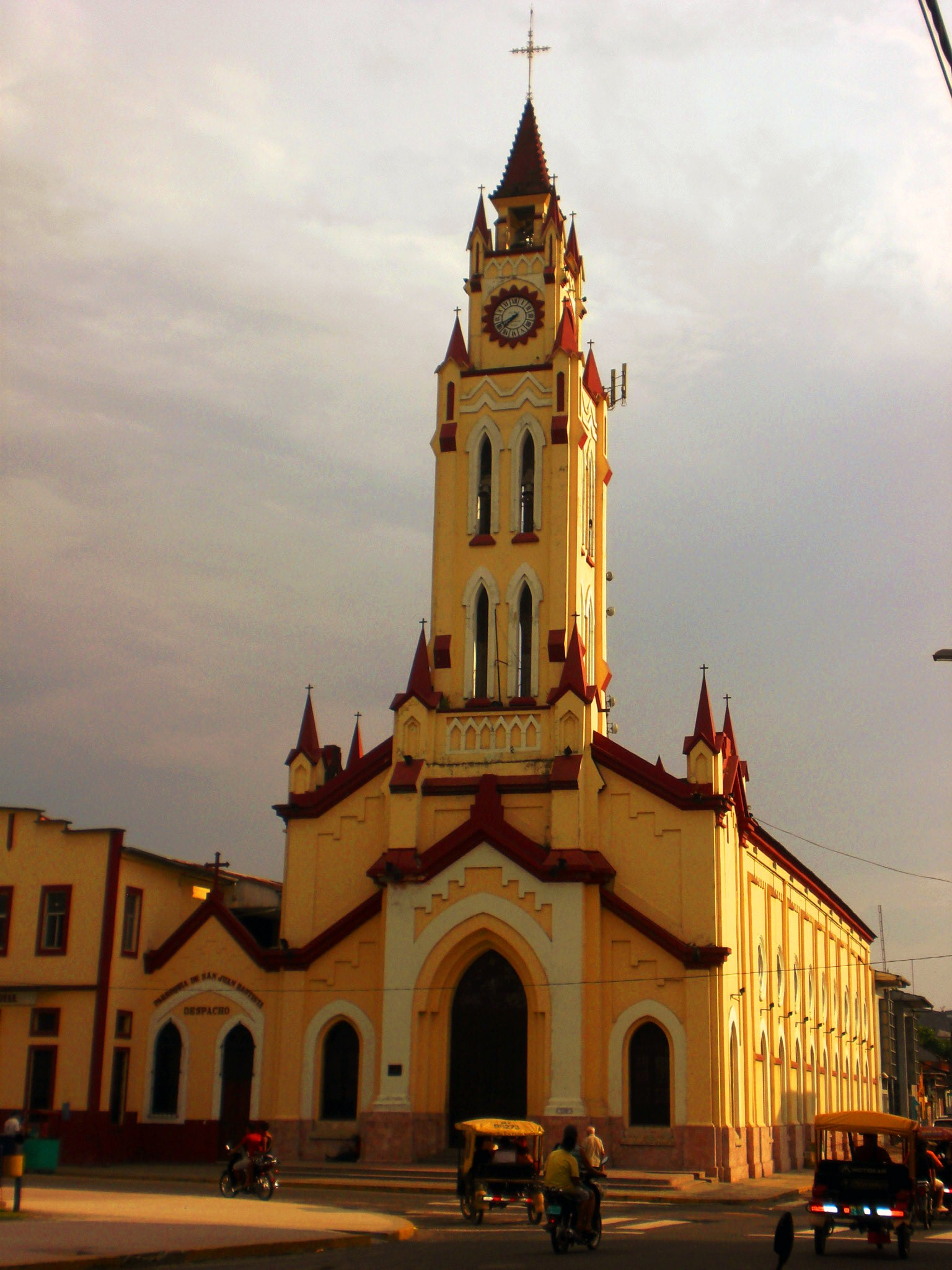
Iglesia Matriz in Iquitos, Peru

The Cabanagem revolt (1835–1840) was directed against the white ruling class. It is estimated that from 30% to 40% of the population of Grão-Pará, estimated at 100,000 people, died.

The population of the Brazilian portion of the Amazon basin in 1850 was perhaps 300,000, of whom about 175,000 were Europeans and 25,000 were slaves. The Brazilian Amazon's principal commercial city, Pará (now Belém), had from 10,000 to 12,000 inhabitants, including slaves. The town of Manáos, now Manaus, at the mouth of the Rio Negro, had a population between 1,000 and 1,500. All the remaining villages, as far up as Tabatinga, on the Brazilian frontier of Peru, were relatively small.

On 6 September 1850, Emperor Pedro II of Brazil sanctioned a law authorizing steam navigation on the Amazon and gave the Viscount of Mauá (Irineu Evangelista de Sousa) the task of putting it into effect. He organised the "Companhia de Navegação e Comércio do Amazonas" in Rio de Janeiro in 1852; in the following year it commenced operations with four small steamers, the Monarca ('Monarch'), the Cametá, the Marajó and the Rio Negro.

At first, navigation was principally confined to the main river; and even in 1857 a modification of the government contract only obliged the company to a monthly service between Pará and Manaus, with steamers of 200 tons cargo capacity, a second line to make six round voyages a year between Manaus and Tabatinga, and a third, two trips a month between Pará and Cametá. This was the first step in opening up the vast interior.

The success of the venture called attention to the opportunities for economic exploitation of the Amazon, and a second company soon opened commerce on the Madeira, Purús, and Negro; a third established a line between Pará and Manaus, and a fourth found it profitable to navigate some of the smaller streams. In that same period, the Amazonas Company was increasing its fleet. Meanwhile, private individuals were building and running small steam craft of their own on the main river as well as on many of its tributaries.

On 31 July 1867, the government of Brazil, constantly pressed by the maritime powers and by the countries encircling the upper Amazon basin, especially Peru, decreed the opening of the Amazon to all countries, but they limited this to certain defined points: Tabatinga – on the Amazon; Cametá – on the Tocantins; Santarém – on the Tapajós; Borba – on the Madeira, and Manaus – on the Rio Negro. The Brazilian decree took effect on 7 September 1867.

Thanks in part to the mercantile development associated with steamboat navigation coupled with the internationally driven demand for natural rubber, the Peruvian city of Iquitos became a thriving, cosmopolitan center of commerce. Foreign companies settled in Iquitos, from where they controlled the extraction of rubber. In 1851 Iquitos had a population of 200, and by 1900 its population reached 20,000. In the 1860s, approximately 3,000 tons of rubber were being exported annually, and by 1911 annual exports had grown to 44,000 tons, representing 9.3% of Peru's exports. During the rubber boom it is estimated that diseases brought by immigrants, such as typhus and malaria, killed 40,000 native Amazonians.

The first direct foreign trade with Manaus commenced around 1874. Local trade along the river was carried on by the English successors to the Amazonas Company—the Amazon Steam Navigation Company—as well as numerous small steamboats, belonging to companies and firms engaged in the rubber trade, navigating the Negro, Madeira, Purús, and many other tributaries, such as the Marañón, to ports as distant as Nauta, Peru.

By the turn of the 20th century, the exports of the Amazon basin were India-rubber, cacao beans, Brazil nuts and a few other products of minor importance, such as pelts and exotic forest produce (resins, barks, woven hammocks, prized bird feathers, live animals) and extracted goods, such as lumber and gold.

=== 20th-century development ===
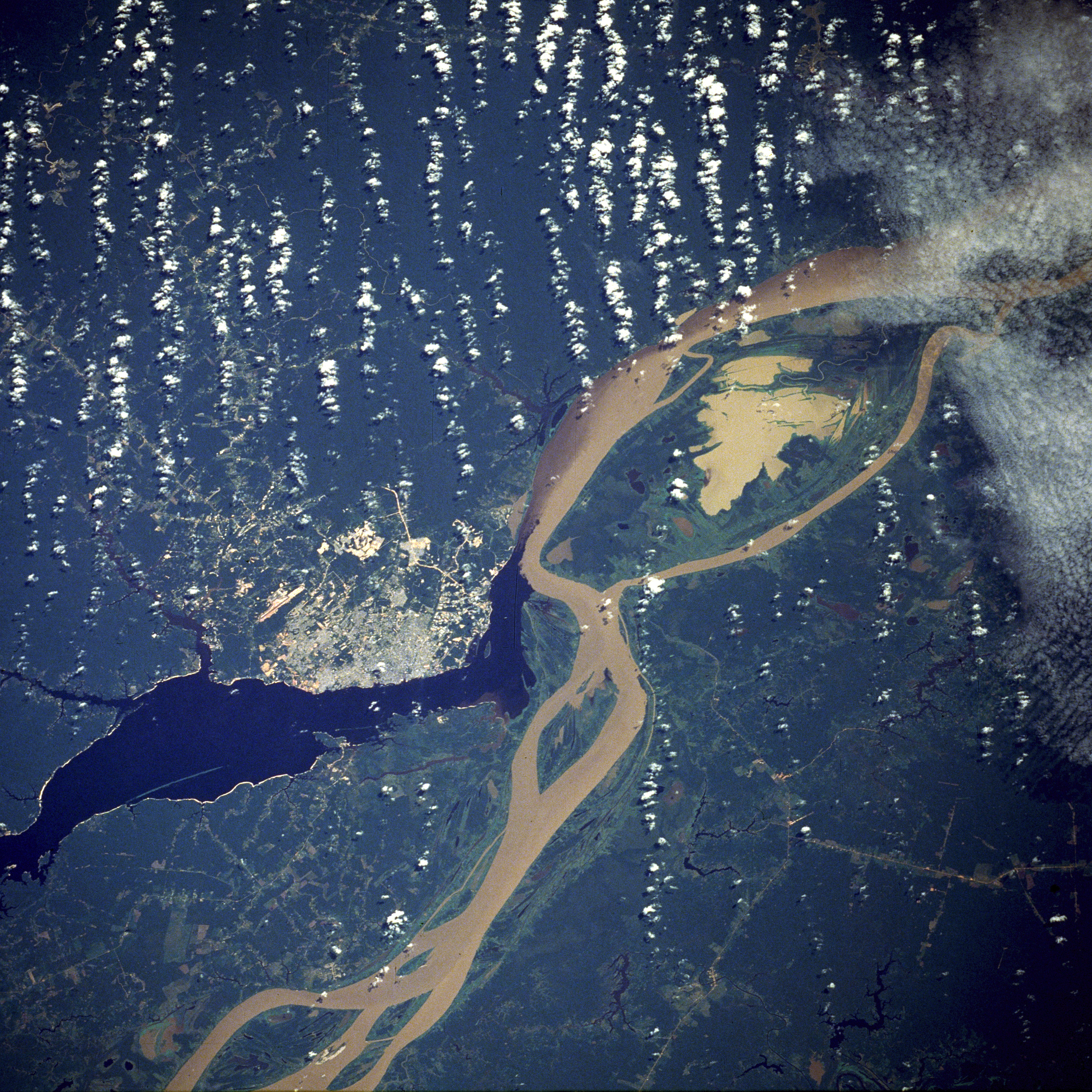
Manaus, the largest city in Amazonas, as seen from a NASA satellite image, surrounded by the dark Rio Negro and the muddy Amazon River

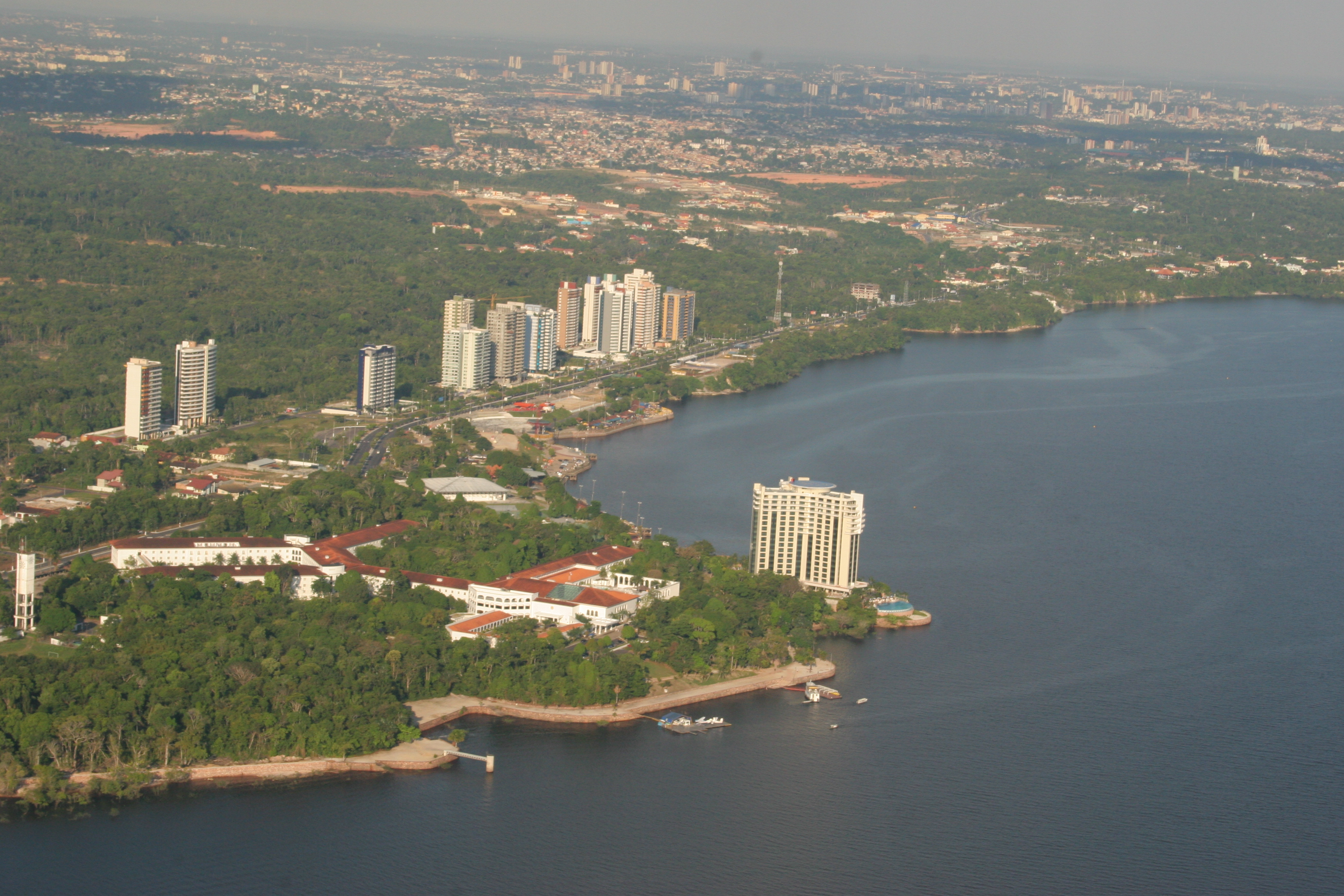
City of Manaus

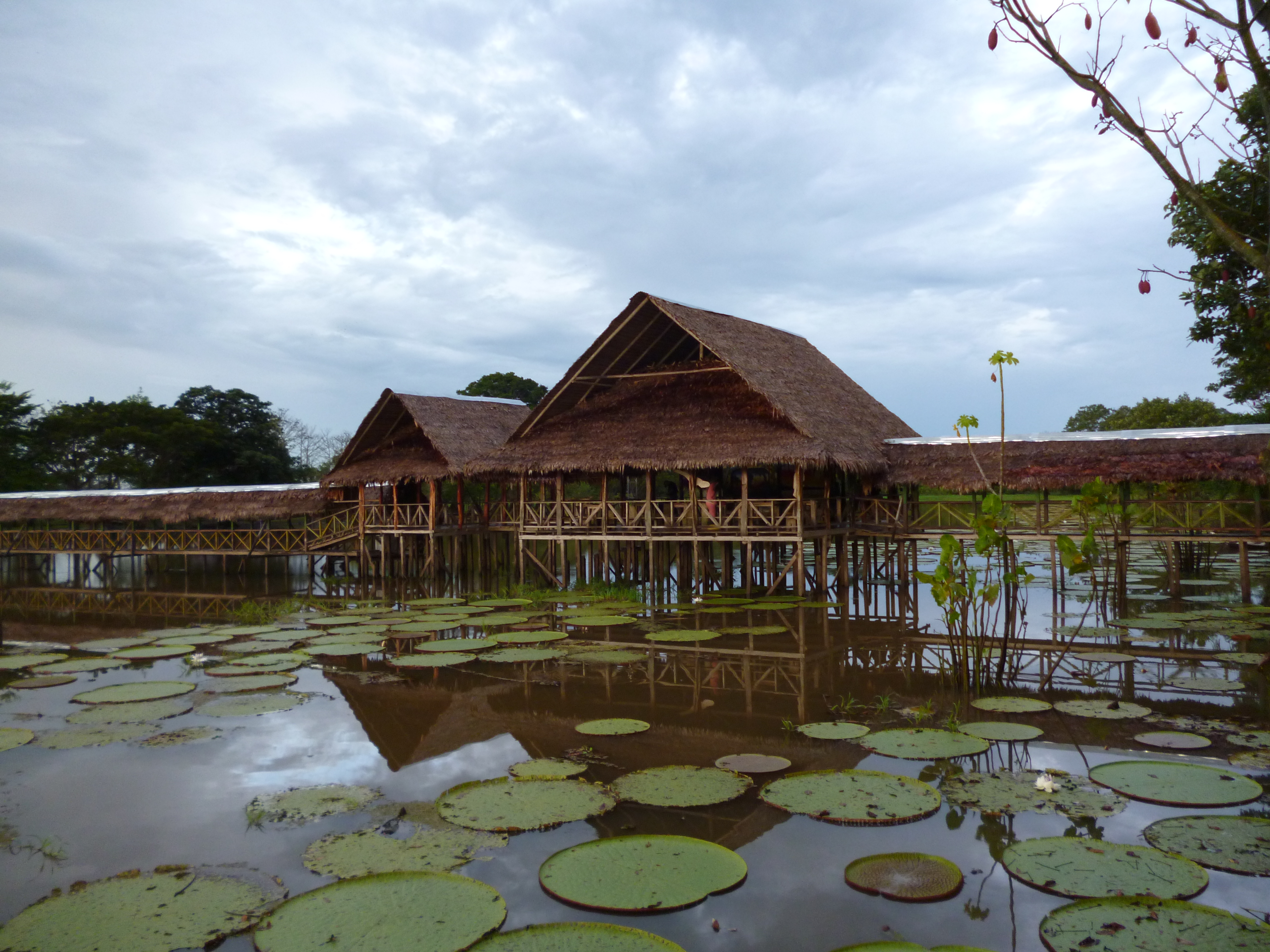
Floating houses in Leticia, Colombia

Since colonial times, the Portuguese portion of the Amazon basin has remained a land largely undeveloped by agriculture and occupied by indigenous people who survived the arrival of European diseases.

Four centuries after the European discovery of the Amazon river, the total cultivated area in its basin was probably less than 65 km^{2} (25 sq mi), excluding the limited and crudely cultivated areas among the mountains at its extreme headwaters. This situation changed dramatically during the 20th century.

Wary of foreign exploitation of the nation's resources, Brazilian governments in the 1940s set out to develop the interior, away from the seaboard where foreigners owned large tracts of land. The original architect of this expansion was president Getúlio Vargas, with the demand for rubber from the Allied forces in World War II providing funding for the drive.

In the 1960s, economic exploitation of the Amazon basin was seen as a way to fuel the "economic miracle" occurring at the time. This resulted in the development of "Operation Amazon", an economic development project that brought large-scale agriculture and ranching to Amazonia. This was done through a combination of credit and fiscal incentives.

However, in the 1970s the government took a new approach with the National Integration Program (PIN). A large-scale colonization program saw families from northeastern Brazil relocated to the "land without people" in the Amazon Basin. This was done in conjunction with infrastructure projects mainly the Trans-Amazonian Highway (Transamazônica).

The Trans-Amazonian Highway's three pioneering highways were completed within ten years but never fulfilled their promise. Large portions of the Trans-Amazonian and its accessory roads, such as BR-317 (Manaus-Porto Velho), are derelict and impassable in the rainy season. Small towns and villages are scattered across the forest, and because its vegetation is so dense, some remote areas are still unexplored.

Many settlements grew along the road from Brasília to Belém with the highway and National Integration Program, however, the program failed as the settlers were unequipped to live in the delicate rainforest ecosystem. This, although the government believed it could sustain millions, instead could sustain very few.

With a population of 1.9 million people in 2014, Manaus is the largest city on the Amazon. Manaus alone makes up approximately 50% of the population of the largest Brazilian state of Amazonas. The racial makeup of the city is 64% pardo (mulatto and mestizo) and 32% white.

Although the Amazon river remains undammed, around 412 dams are in operation on the Amazon's tributary rivers. Of these 412 dams, 151 are constructed over six of the main tributary rivers that drain into the Amazon. Since only 4% of the Amazon's hydropower potential has been developed in countries like Brazil, more damming projects are underway and hundreds more are planned. After witnessing the negative effects of environmental degradation, sedimentation, navigation and flood control caused by the Three Gorges Dam in the Yangtze River, scientists are worried that constructing more dams in the Amazon will harm its biodiversity in the same way by "blocking fish-spawning runs, reducing the flows of vital oil nutrients and clearing forests". Damming the Amazon River could potentially bring about the "end of free flowing rivers" and contribute to an "ecosystem collapse" that will cause major social and environmental problems.

== Course ==
=== Origins ===
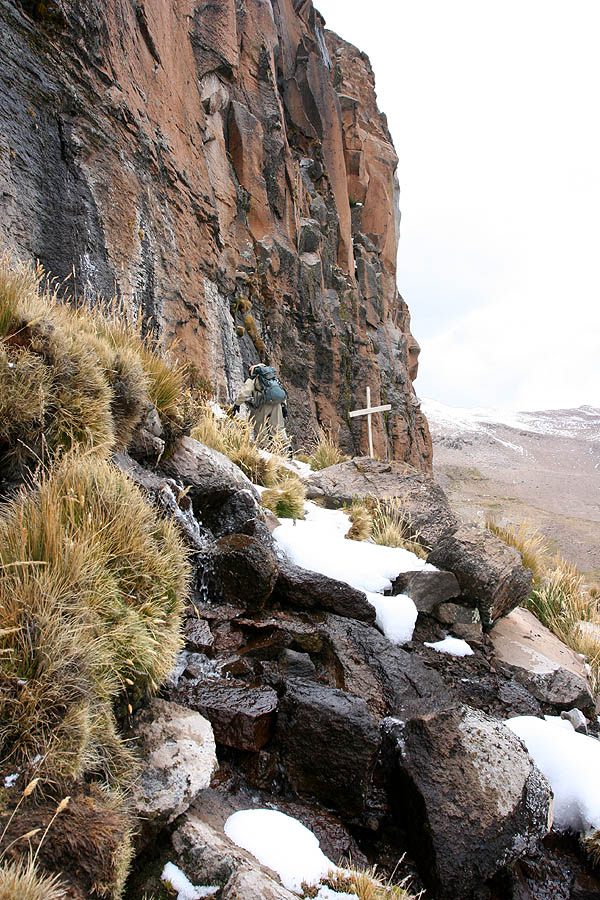
The Amazon was thought to originate from the Apacheta cliff in Arequipa at the Nevado Mismi, marked only by a wooden cross.

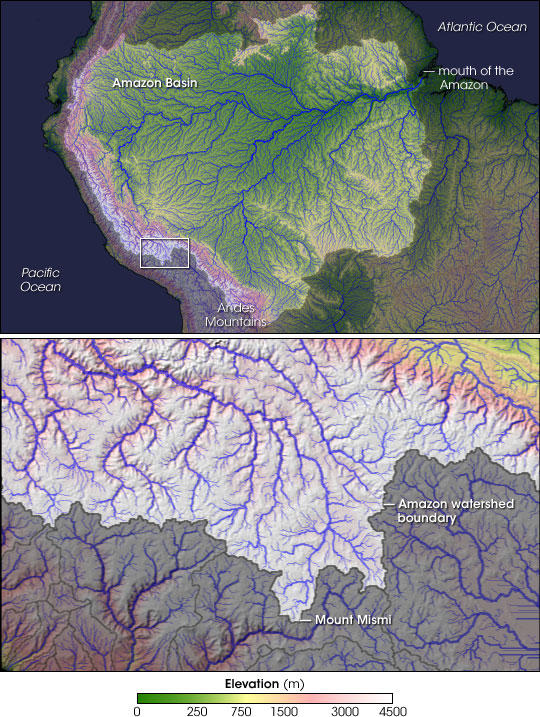
Nevado Mismi, formerly considered to be the source of the Amazon

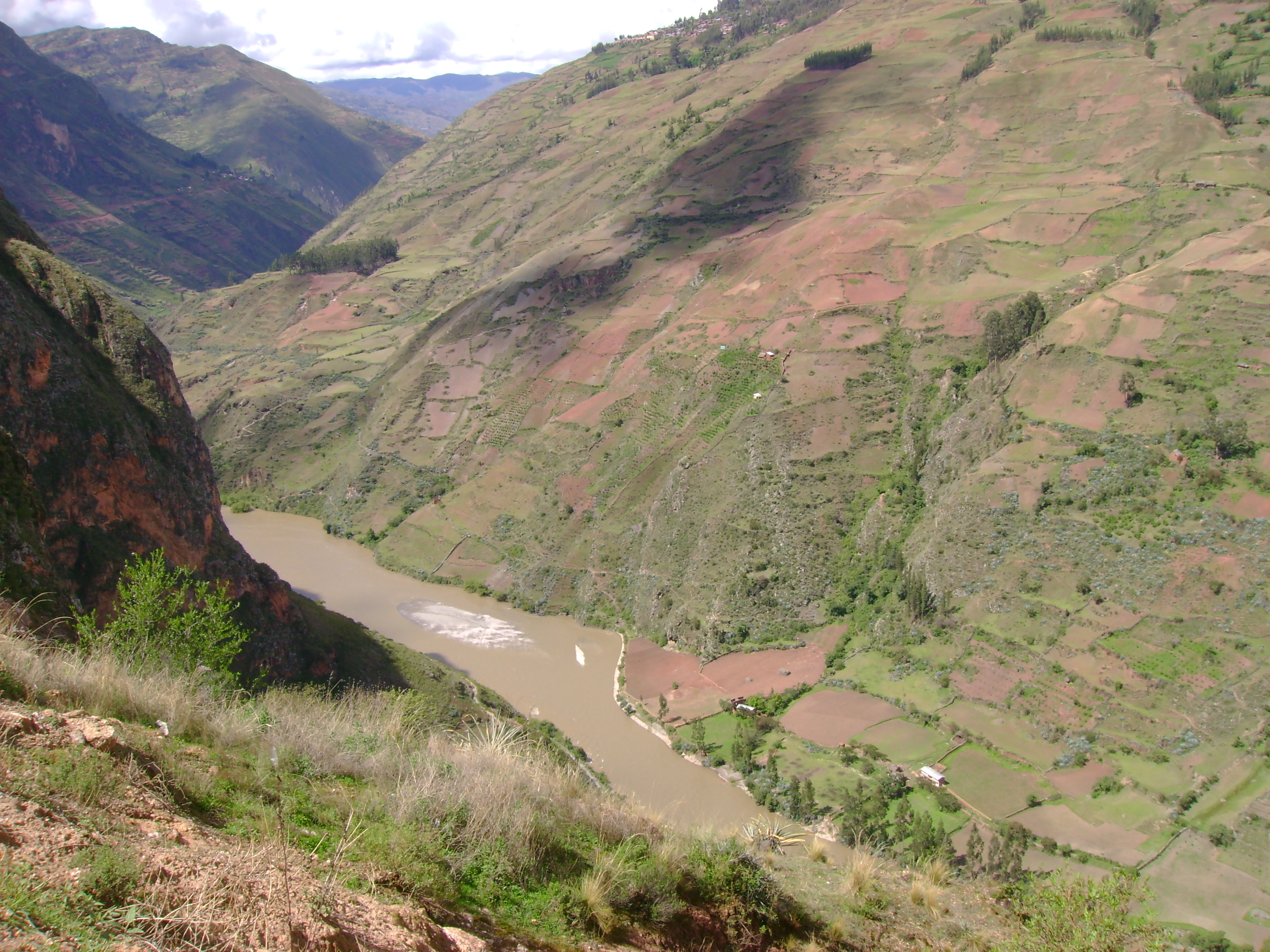
Marañón River in Peru

The most distant source of the Amazon was thought to be in the Apurímac river drainage for nearly a century. Such studies continued to be published even as recently as 1996, 2001, 2007, and 2008, where various authors identified the snowcapped 5,597 m (18,363 ft) Nevado Mismi peak, located roughly 160 km (99 mi) west of Lake Titicaca and 700 km (430 mi) southeast of Lima, as the most distant source of the river. From that point, Quebrada Carhuasanta emerges from Nevado Mismi, joins Quebrada Apacheta and soon forms Río Lloqueta which becomes Río Hornillos and eventually joins the Río Apurímac.

A 2014 study by Americans James Contos and Nicolas Tripcevich in Area, a peer-reviewed journal of the Royal Geographical Society, however, identifies the most distant source of the Amazon as actually being in the Río Mantaro drainage. A variety of methods were used to compare the lengths of the Mantaro river vs. the Apurímac river from their most distant source points to their confluence, showing the longer length of the Mantaro. Then distances from Lago Junín to several potential source points in the uppermost Mantaro river were measured, which enabled them to determine that the Cordillera Rumi Cruz was the most distant source of water in the Mantaro basin (and therefore in the entire Amazon basin). The most accurate measurement method was direct GPS measurement obtained by kayak descent of each of the rivers from their source points to their confluence (performed by Contos). Obtaining these measurements was difficult given the class IV–V nature of each of these rivers, especially in their lower "Abyss" sections. Ultimately, they determined that the most distant point in the Mantaro drainage is nearly 80 km farther upstream compared to Mt. Mismi in the Apurímac drainage, and thus the maximal length of the Amazon river is about 80 km longer than previously thought. Contos continued downstream to the ocean and finished the first complete descent of the Amazon from its newly identified source (finishing November 2012), a journey repeated by two groups after the news spread.

After about 700 km (430 mi), the Apurímac then joins Río Mantaro to form the Ene, which joins the Perene to form the Tambo, which joins the Urubamba River to form the Ucayali. After the confluence of Apurímac and Ucayali, the river leaves Andean terrain and is surrounded by floodplain. From this point to the confluence of the Ucayali and the Marañón, some 1,600 km (990 mi), the forested banks are just above the water and are inundated long before the river attains its maximum flood stage. The low river banks are interrupted by only a few hills, and the river enters the enormous Amazon rainforest.

=== The Upper Amazon or Solimões ===
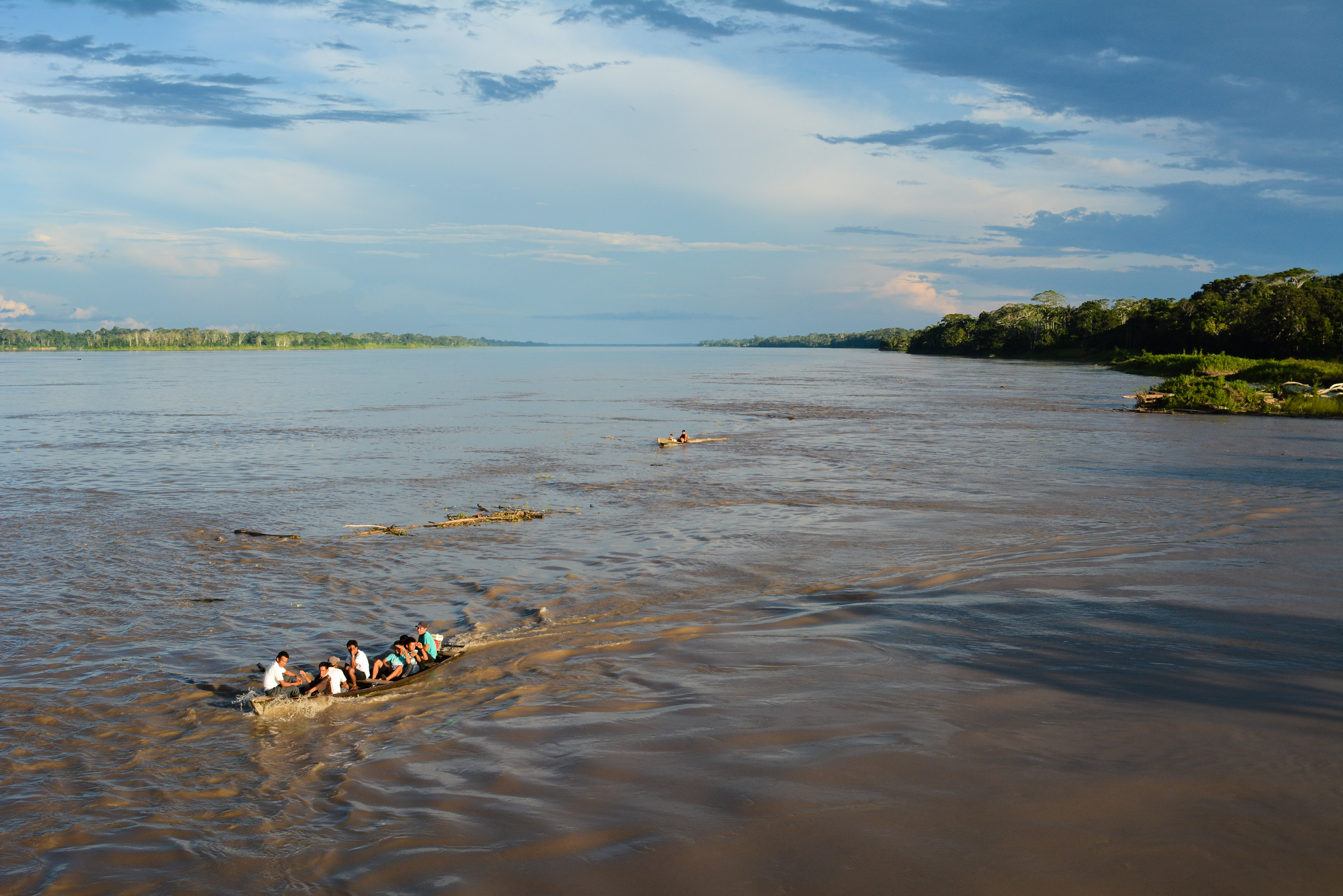
Amazon River near Iquitos, Peru

Although the Ucayali–Marañón confluence is the point at which most geographers place the beginning of the Amazon River proper, in Brazil the river is known at this point as the Solimões das Águas. The river systems and flood plains in Brazil, Peru, Ecuador, Colombia, and Venezuela, whose waters drain into the Solimões and its tributaries, are called the "Upper Amazon".

The Amazon proper runs mostly through Brazil and Peru, and is part of the border between Colombia and Peru. It has a series of major tributaries in Colombia, Ecuador and Peru, some of which flow into the Marañón and Ucayali, and others directly into the Amazon proper. These include rivers Putumayo, Caquetá, Vaupés, Guainía, Morona, Pastaza, Nucuray, Urituyacu, Chambira, Tigre, Nanay, Napo, and Huallaga.

At some points, the river divides into anabranches, or multiple channels, often very long, with inland and lateral channels, all connected by a complicated system of natural canals, cutting the low, flat igapó lands, which are never more than 5 m (16 ft) above low river, into many islands.

From the town of Canaria at the great bend of the Amazon to the Negro, vast areas of land are submerged at high water, above which only the upper part of the trees of the sombre forests appear. Near the mouth of the Rio Negro to Serpa, nearly opposite the river Madeira, the banks of the Amazon are low, until approaching Manaus, they rise to become rolling hills.

=== The Lower Amazon ===
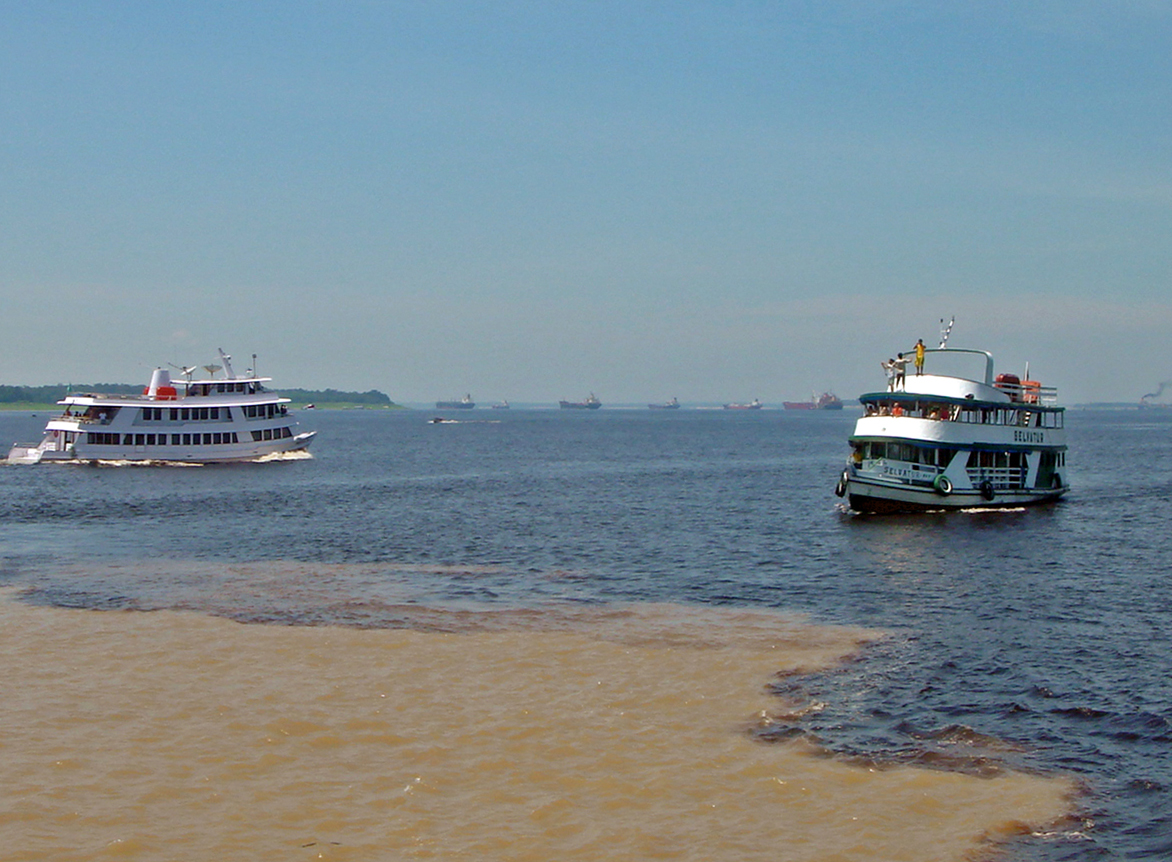
Meeting of Waters; the confluence of Rio Negro (blue) and Rio Solimões (sandy) near Manaus, Brazil

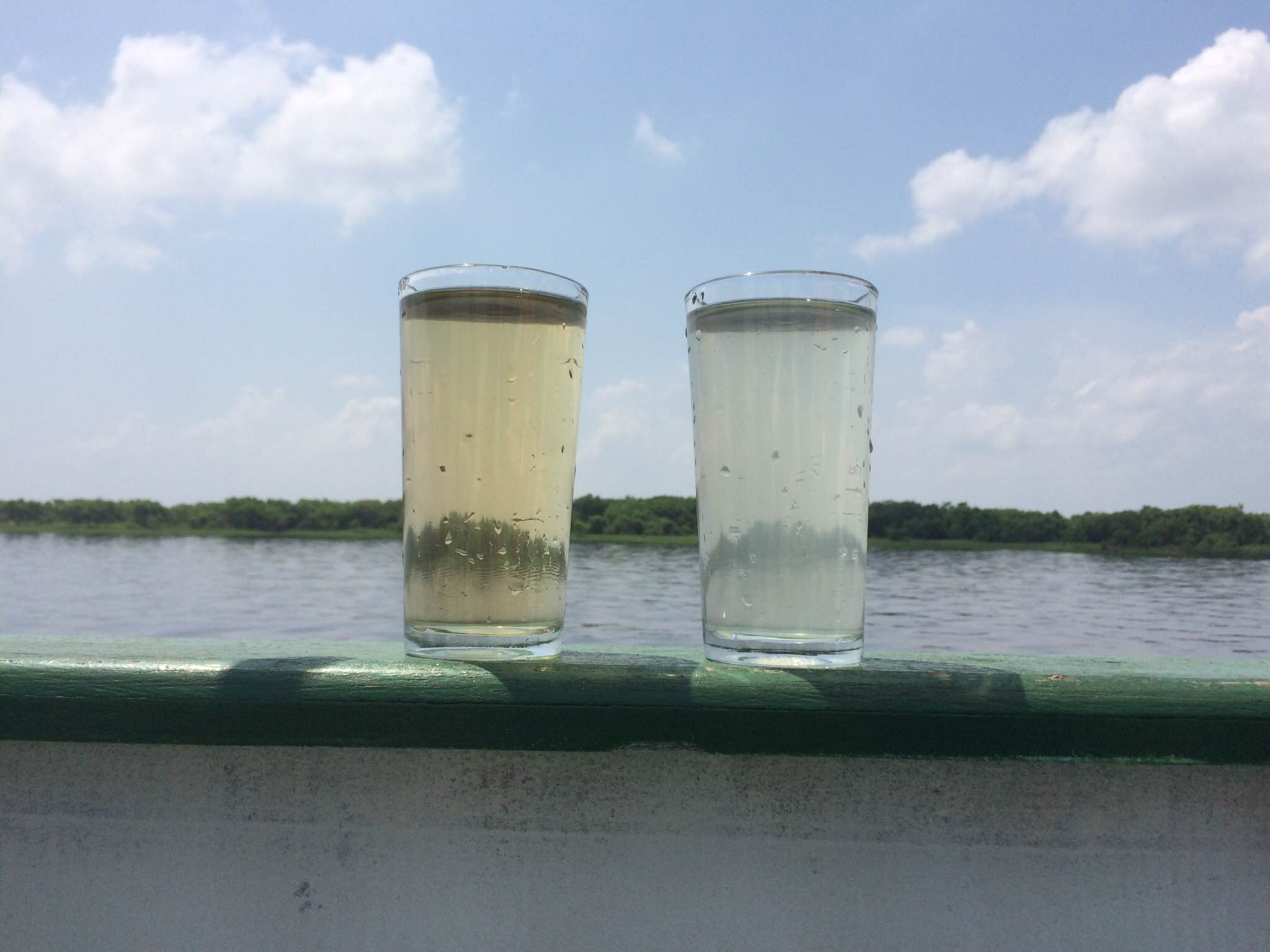
Water samples of the Solimões (right) and Rio Negro (left)

The Lower Amazon begins where the darkly colored waters of the Rio Negro meets the sandy-colored Rio Solimões (the upper Amazon), and for over 6 km (3.7 mi) these waters run side by side without mixing. At Óbidos, a bluff 17 m (56 ft) above the river is backed by low hills. The lower Amazon seems to have once been a gulf of the Atlantic Ocean, the waters of which washed the cliffs near Óbidos.

Only about 10% of the Amazon's water enters downstream of Óbidos, very little of which is from the northern slope of the valley. The drainage area of the Amazon basin above Óbidos city is about 4,700,000 km^{2} (1,800,000 sq mi), and, below, only about 1,300,000 km^{2} (500,000 sq mi) (around 20%), exclusive of the 1,000,000 km^{2} (390,000 sq mi) of the Tocantins basin. The Tocantins River enters the southern portion of the Amazon delta.

In the lower reaches of the river, the north bank consists of a series of steep, table-topped hills extending for about 240 km (150 mi) from opposite the mouth of the Xingu as far as Monte Alegre. These hills are cut down to a kind of terrace which lies between them and the river.

On the south bank, above the Xingu, a line of low bluffs bordering the floodplain extends nearly to Santarém in a series of gentle curves before they bend to the southwest, and, abutting upon the lower Tapajós, merge into the bluffs which form the terrace margin of the Tapajós river valley.

=== Mouth ===
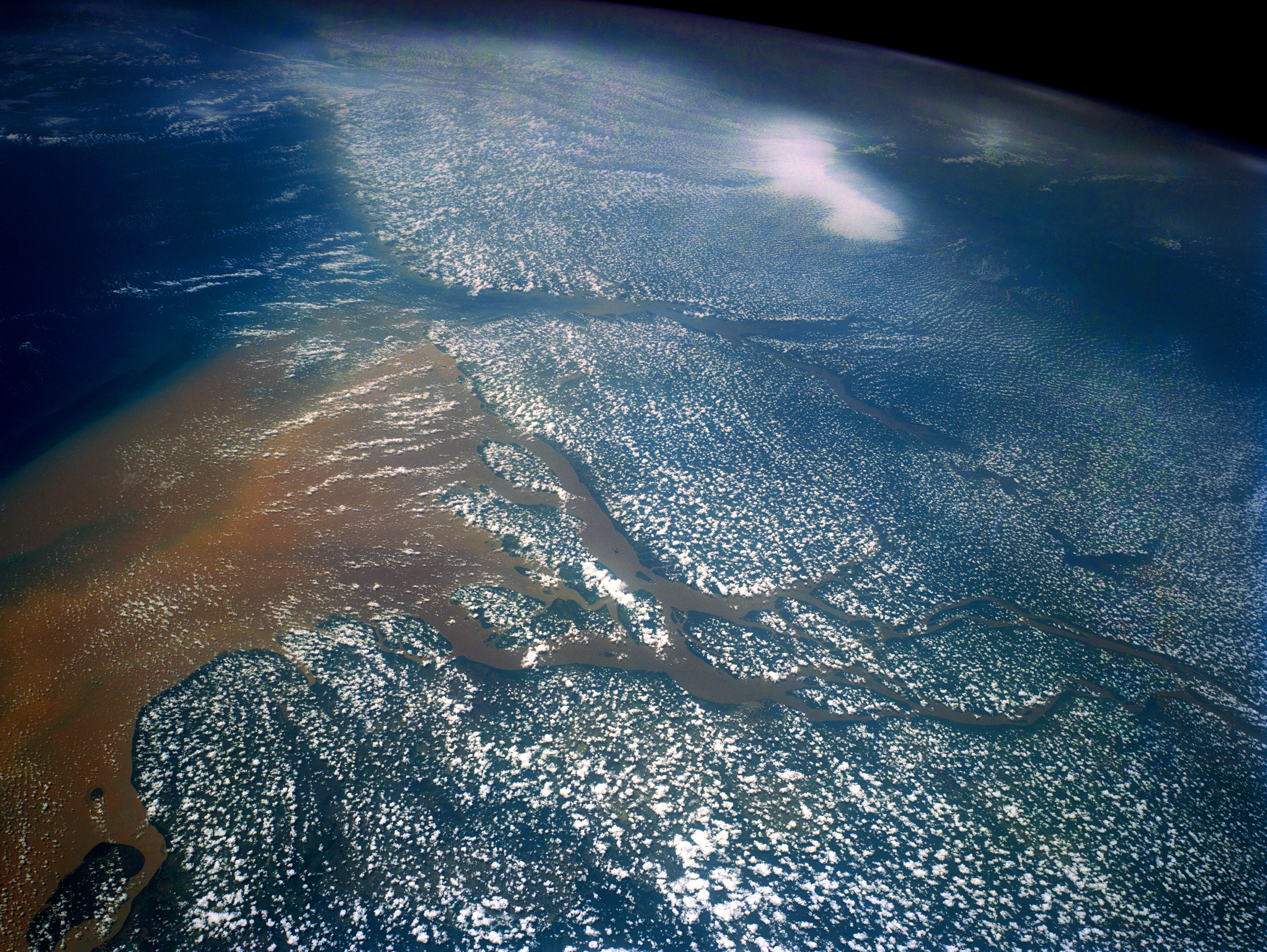
Satellite image of the mouth of the Amazon River, from the north looking south

Belém is the major city and port at the mouth of the river at the Atlantic Ocean. The definition of where exactly the mouth of the Amazon is located, and how wide it is, is a matter of dispute, because of the area's peculiar geography. The Pará and the Amazon are connected by a series of river channels called furos near the town of Breves; between them lies Marajó, the world's largest combined river/sea island.

If the Pará river and the Marajó island ocean frontage are included, the Amazon estuary is some 325 km (202 mi) wide. In this case, the width of the mouth of the river is usually measured from Cabo Norte, the cape located straight east of Pracuúba in the Brazilian state of Amapá, to Ponta da Tijoca near the town of Curuçá, in the state of Pará.

A more conservative measurement excluding the Pará river estuary, from the mouth of the Araguari River to Ponta do Navio on the northern coast of Marajó, would still give the mouth of the Amazon a width of over 180 km (112 mi). If only the river's main channel is considered, between the islands of Curuá (state of Amapá) and Jurupari (state of Pará), the width falls to about 15 km (9.3 mi).

The plume generated by the river's discharge covers up to 1.3 million km^{2} and is responsible for muddy bottoms influencing a wide area of the tropical north Atlantic in terms of salinity, pH, light penetration, and sedimentation.

=== Lack of bridges ===
There are no bridges across the entire width of the river. This is not because the river would be too wide to bridge; for most of its length, engineers could build a bridge across the river easily. For most of its course, the river flows through the Amazon Rainforest, where there are very few roads and cities. Most of the time, the crossing can be done by a ferry. The Manaus Iranduba Bridge linking the cities of Manaus and Iranduba spans the Rio Negro, the second-largest tributary of the Amazon, just before their confluence.

=== Dispute regarding length ===
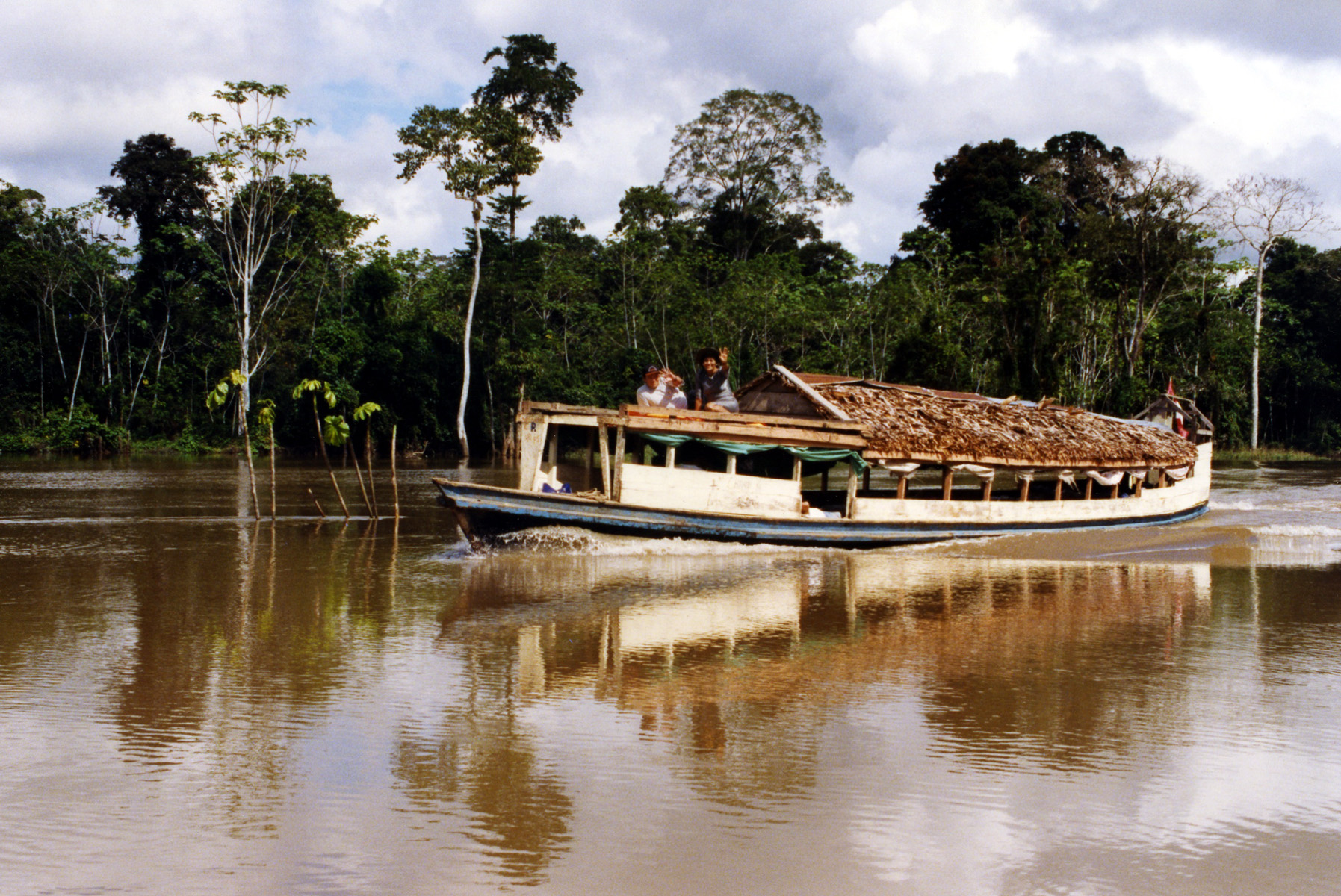
River taxi in Peru

While debate as to whether the Amazon or the Nile is the world's longest river has gone on for many years, the historic consensus of geographic authorities has been to regard the Amazon as the second longest river in the world, with the Nile being the longest. However, the Amazon has been reported as being anywhere between 6,275 km (3,899 mi) and 6,992 km (4,345 mi) long. It is often said to be "at least" 6,400 km (4,000 mi) long. The Nile is reported to be anywhere from 5,499 to 7,088 km (3,417 to 4,404 mi). Often it is said to be "about" 6,650 km (4,130 mi) long. There are several factors that can affect these measurements, such as the position of the geographical source and the mouth, the scale of measurement, and the length measuring techniques (for details see also List of rivers by length).

In July 2008, the Brazilian Institute for Space Research (INPE) published a news article on their webpage, claiming that the Amazon River was 140 km (87 mi) longer than the Nile. The Amazon's length was calculated as 6,992 km (4,345 mi), taking the Apacheta Creek as its source. Using the same techniques, the length of the Nile was calculated as 6,853 km (4,258 mi), which is longer than previous estimates but still shorter than the Amazon. The results were reached by measuring the Amazon downstream to the beginning of the tidal estuary of Canal do Sul and then, after a sharp turn back, following tidal canals surrounding the isle of Marajó and finally including the marine waters of the Río Pará bay in its entire length. According to an earlier article on the webpage of the National Geographic, the Amazon's length was calculated as 6,800 km (4,200 mi) by a Brazilian scientist. In June 2007, Guido Gelli, director of science at the Brazilian Institute of Geography and Statistics (IBGE), told London's Telegraph Newspaper that it could be considered that the Amazon was the longest river in the world. However, according to the above sources, none of the two results was published, and questions were raised about the researchers' methodology. In 2009, a peer-reviewed article was published concluding that the Nile is longer than the Amazon by stating a length of 7,088 km (4,404 mi) for the Nile and 6,575 km (4,086 mi) for the Amazon, measured by using a combination of satellite image analysis and field investigations to the source regions. According to the Encyclopædia Britannica, the final length of the Amazon remains open to interpretation and continued debate.

== Watershed ==
The Amazon basin, the largest in the world, covers about 40% of South America, an area of approximately 7,050,000 square kilometres (2,722,020 sq mi). It drains from west to east, from Iquitos in Peru, across Brazil to the Atlantic. It gathers its waters from 5 degrees north latitude to 20 degrees south latitude. Its most remote sources are found on the inter-Andean plateau, just a short distance from the Pacific Ocean.

The Amazon River and its tributaries are characterised by extensive forested areas that become flooded every rainy season. Every year, the river rises more than 9 m (30 ft), flooding the surrounding forests, known as várzea ("flooded forests"). The Amazon's flooded forests are the most extensive example of this habitat type in the world. In an average dry season, 110,000 km^{2} (42,000 sq mi) of land are water-covered, while in the wet season, the flooded area of the Amazon basin rises to 350,000 km^{2} (140,000 sq mi).

The quantity of water released by the Amazon to the Atlantic Ocean is enormous: up to 300,000 m^{3}/s (11,000,000 cu ft/s) in the rainy season, with an average of 209,000 m^{3}/s (7,400,000 cu ft/s) from 1973 to 1990. The Amazon is responsible for about 20% of the Earth's fresh water entering the ocean. The river pushes a vast plume of fresh water into the ocean. The plume is about 400 km (250 mi) long and between 100 and 200 km (62 and 124 mi) wide. The fresh water, being lighter, flows on top of the seawater, diluting the salinity and altering the colour of the ocean surface over an area up to 2,500,000 km^{2} (970,000 sq mi) in extent. For centuries ships have reported fresh water near the Amazon's mouth yet well out of sight of land in what otherwise seemed to be the open ocean.

Despite this, the Atlantic has sufficient wave and tidal energy to carry most of the Amazon's sediments out to sea, thus the Amazon does not form a significant river delta. The great deltas of the world are all in relatively protected bodies of water, while the Amazon empties directly into the turbulent Atlantic.

There is a natural water union between the Amazon and the Orinoco basins, the so-called Casiquiare canal. The Casiquiare is a river distributary of the upper Orinoco, which flows southward into the Rio Negro, which in turn flows into the Amazon. The Casiquiare is the largest river on earth that links two major river systems, a so-called bifurcation.

== Discharge ==
Average discharge at the estuary; Period from 2003 to 2015: 7,200 km^{3}/a (230,000 m^{3}/s)

Year	(km^{3})	(m^{3}/s)	Year	(km^{3})	(m^{3}/s)
2003	6,470	205,000	2010	6,464	205,000
2004	6,747	214,000	2011	7,378	234,000
2005	6,522	207,000	2012	7,513	238,000
2006	7,829	248,000	2013	7,288	231,000
2007	7,133	226,000	2014	7,674	243,000
2008	7,725	245,000	2015	6,657	211,000
2009	8,200	260,000			

=== Amazon Delta ===
Water discharge of the Amazon with Tocantins River. Complete series from starting 1920.

Average discharge (10^{3} m^{3}/s)
Year	Discharge	Year	Discharge
2015	210.9	1967	231
2014	243.2	1966	237
2013	230.9	1965	232
2012	238.1	1964	218
2011	233.8	1963	240
2010	204.8	1962	220
2009	260	1961	229
2008	244.8	1960	207
2007	226	1959	236
2006	248.1	1958	229
2005	206.7	1957	210
2004	213.8	1956	230
2003	205	1955	233
2002	214	1954	238
2001	216	1953	234
2000	234	1952	223
1999	212	1951	227
1998	149	1950	230
1997	201	1949	213
1996	212	1948	228
1995	195	1947	210
1994	240	1946	222
1993	218	1945	192
1992	156	1944	220
1991	218	1943	208
1990	198	1942	200
1989	230	1941	203
1988	200	1940	208
1987	180	1939	229
1986	208	1938	200
1985	240	1937	188
1984	270	1936	183
1983	186	1935	215
1982	236	1934	230
1981	202	1933	200
1980	190	1932	214
1979	224	1931	190
1978	233	1930	209
1977	232	1929	201
1976	239	1928	208
1975	242	1927	220
1974	242	1926	202
1973	224	1925	210
1972	238	1924	222
1971	235	1923	210
1970	220	1922	219
1969	211	1921	224
1968	210	1920	200

Monthly average discharge (m^{3}/s)
Month	Discharge	
Month	Amazon	Pará
January	126,100	7,300
February	177,100	14,200
March	186,300	18,200
April	201,300	28,700
May	236,600	38,700
June	275,600	40,500
July	296,900	32,600
August	288,500	14,500
September	262,500	6,100
October	227,000	2,500
November	118,800	1,000
December	82,400	1,000
Average	206,600	17,100

=== Santarém ===
Water discharge of the Amazon River at the Santarém gauging station.

Average, minimum and maximum discharge (1998/01/01—2024/12/31)
Year	Discharge (m^{3}/s)		
Year	Min	Mean	Max
1998	69,202	175,218	278,306
1999	73,921	182,266	270,080
2000	73,306	171,899	275,060
2001	67,300	173,517	268,820
2002	92,711	207,186	296,805
2003	100,473	182,767	252,626
2004	100,986	184,880	265,644
2005	67,464	172,411	280,340
2006	91,126	192,500	301,860
2007	73,256	192,715	309,478
2008	101,146	198,128	316,669
2009	76,598	204,920	303,192
2010	72,101	172,255	255,208
2011	65,803	155,030	256,798
2012	50,070	194,883	323,680
2013	55,108	206,295	305,526
2014	151,997	235,390	338,905
2015	70,119	261,580	378,767
2016	69,995	230,788	367,296
2017	104,111	223,193	352,935
2018	95,376	262,946	386,022
2019	96,260	260,664	382,840
2020	72,955	234,725	388,213
2021	94,903	262,264	376,740
2022	101,693	259,902	405,999
2023	46,130	217,551	370,109
2024	48,898	198,627	350,570
Source: The Flood Observatory

=== Óbidos ===
Water discharge of the Amazon River at the Óbidos gauging station. Complete series from starting 1903.

Average, minimum and maximum discharge (m^{3}/s)
Year	Min	Mean	Max	Year	Min	Mean	Max
2023	61,000	154,988	333,700	1962	92,800	167,864	245,100
2022	77,200	162,990	375,200	1961	77,800	153,577	221,400
2021	106,700	177,000	353,800	1960	99,300	161,502	230,300
2020	92,800	170,912	344,800	1959	103,000	159,604	231,900
2019	87,900	162,810	352,300	1958	73,700	153,243	234,300
2018	92,300	180,232	336,200	1957	84,200	156,814	227,200
2017	93,300	181,025	352,100	1956	123,700	160,720	236,100
2016	87,600	159,308	347,500	1955	80,100	166,970	252,700
2015	120,400	186,731	355,300	1954	94,400	173,000	253,300
2014	113,000	196,940	321,700	1953	90,600	189,070	394,000
2013	117,400	193,573	301,200	1952	94,100	158,150	317,000
2012	87,900	192,292	370,000	1951	101,900	161,110	283,000
2011	80,600	176,523	242,800	1950	78,200	166,078	368,000
2010	77,100	165,902	254,000	1949	116,700	171,323	356,000
2009	85,800	198,590	291,040	1948	78,400	159,946	288,000
2008	87,700	193,072	280,800	1947	109,200	165,500	213,000
2007	95,500	174,068	278,600	1946	93,700	172,012	283,000
2006	88,400	184,690	279,200	1945	88,200	148,566	244,000
2005	72,800	161,830	273,500	1944	96,800	174,608	309,000
2004	86,400	165,096	218,500	1943	88,200	161,866	260,000
2003	90,400	170,802	248,000	1942	93,200	154,500	236,000
2002	93,700	177,493	265,400	1941	86,800	156,379	231,000
2001	74,400	175,527	257,000	1940	119,000	157,708	213,000
2000	87,900	181,146	258,500	1939	126,000	174,625	281,000
1999	75,300	185,737	299,700	1938	94,000	154,412	257,000
1998	75,000	149,382	268,200	1937	82,800	143,237	212,000
1997	72,400	169,129	265,800	1936	81,900	139,133	212,000
1996	108,600	180,190	251,200	1935	82,500	169,612	299,000
1995	74,600	151,499	259,300	1934	129,000	173,166	292,000
1994	106,000	200,335	296,000	1933	83,600	154,658	256,000
1993	106,000	181,290	262,000	1932	93,400	165,096	260,000
1992	91,800	138,555	194,600	1931	88,500	146,354	230,000
1991	82,500	169,444	248,000	1930	98,400	158,679	243,000
1990	83,400	167,368	235,000	1929	86,600	156,037	276,000
1989	120,000	206,941	346,000	1928	92,600	151,000	284,000
1988	92,300	165,547	228,000	1927	119,600	159,940	231,900
1987	92,200	164,552	231,000	1926	70,700	111,513	151,400
1986	125,000	182,247	244,000	1925	96,000	171,547	250,800
1985	113,000	159,840	190,000	1924	95,500	142,416	202,900
1984	105,000	173,350	259,000	1923	91,500	178,802	246,300
1983	86,100	140,892	179,000	1922	129,000	187,619	279,200
1982	96,100	186,200	302,000	1921	93,000	174,784	268,900
1981	88,300	149,806	191,000	1920	116,900	175,452	255,200
1980	91,200	142,473	176,000	1919	88,700	148,443	209,000
1979	91,500	169,696	267,000	1918	103,000	170,543	260,200
1978	115,300	178,293	257,000	1917	94,400	136,835	215,600
1977	119,700	176,834	269,000	1916	70,100	144,984	213,800
1976	95,400	192,734	327,000	1915	86,700	159,604	235,700
1975	106,000	197,545	307,000	1914	94,600	171,882	253,600
1974	131,600	193,870	280,000	1913	131,000	178,132	252,700
1973	123,000	179,537	250,000	1912	112,500	135,047	185,700
1972	109,000	182,624	264,000	1911	83,200	159,710	232,100
1971	121,400	187,121	288,000	1910	102,000	154,024	237,100
1970	84,500	163,232	239,000	1909	76,400	170,095	274,800
1969	89,200	156,720	210,000	1908	102,100	176,793	267,700
1968	113,000	148,220	202,000	1907	84,600	140,184	224,800
1967	89,000	162,506	227,000	1906	69,600	142,194	202,200
1966	87,300	143,868	207,400	1905	93,500	141,524	203,900
1965	85,400	144,650	215,600	1904	93,300	174,561	262,500
1964	103,500	136,612	202,300	1903	82,800	148,220	230,000
1963	72,800	141,190	226,800				

Monthly average discharge (1968–2022)
Month	Discharge (m^{3}/s)
January	137,749
February	163,264
March	186,036
April	206,989
May	220,717
June	221,055
July	209,765
August	186,655
September	149,159
October	112,032
November	102,544
December	114,746

=== Itacoatiara ===
Water discharge of the Amazon River at the Itacoatiara gauging station.

Average, minimum and maximum discharge (1998—2024)
Year	Discharge (m^{3}/s)		
Year	Min	Mean	Max
1998	41,312	139,002	240,396
1999	64,130	171,662	288,869
2000	52,870	161,345	261,176
2001	30,670	157,286	256,627
2002	67,979	164,171	252,425
2003	82,556	149,274	228,998
2004	66,183	139,926	223,929
2005	57,598	145,002	258,383
2006	61,265	168,975	268,108
2007	74,679	161,393	238,839
2008	71,572	168,065	259,841
2009	59,298	166,100	275,544
2010	53,715	128,035	215,638
2011	42,192	129,710	230,293
2012	29,489	172,103	291,537
2013	51,341	172,201	286,872
2014	85,599	192,462	324,191
2015	66,094	221,843	339,832
2016	41,063	167,746	311,494
2017	60,218	205,382	329,771
2018	65,629	202,838	316,291
2019	96,549	227,078	340,215
2020	44,698	214,586	352,671
2021	85,862	236,885	354,795
2022	56,758	214,763	337,412
2023	38,496	173,676	304,336
2024	27,088	156,907	297,641
Source: The Flood Observatory

Monthly average discharge (2008–2021)
Month	Discharge (m^{3}/s)
January	122,910
February	146,170
March	170,972
April	185,403
May	198,166
June	200,022
July	190,811
August	170,101
September	133,948
October	99,706
November	93,029
December	103,054

== Sediment load ==
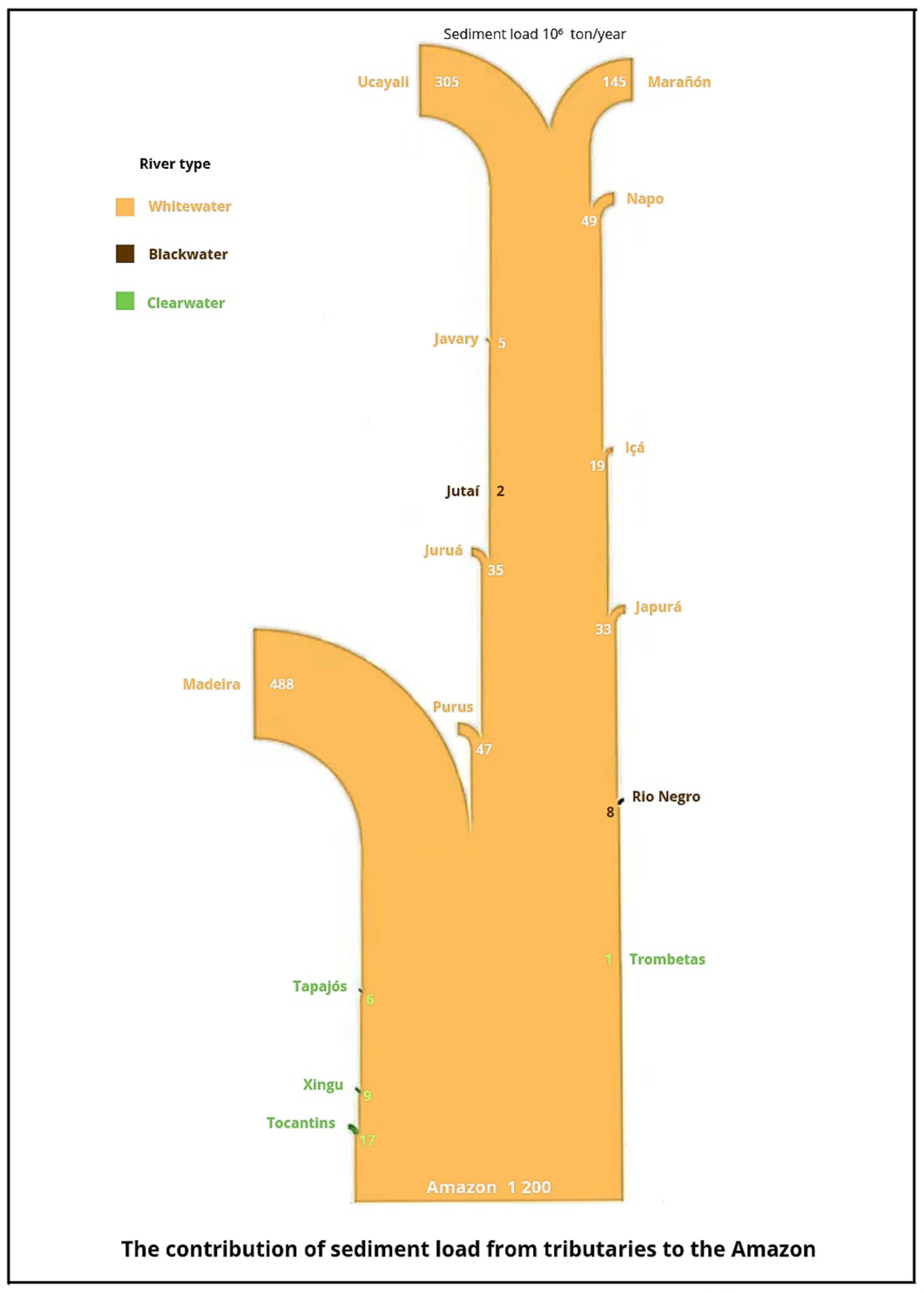
The contribution of the sediment load from tributaries to the Amazon.

Sediment load (S – 754 × 10^{6} ton/year) at Óbidos gauge station (period from 1996 to 2007).

Year	S	Year	S
1996	672	2002	802
1997	691	2003	832
1998	652	2004	807
1999	732	2005	797
2000	692	2006	742
2001	787	2007	842

== Flooding ==
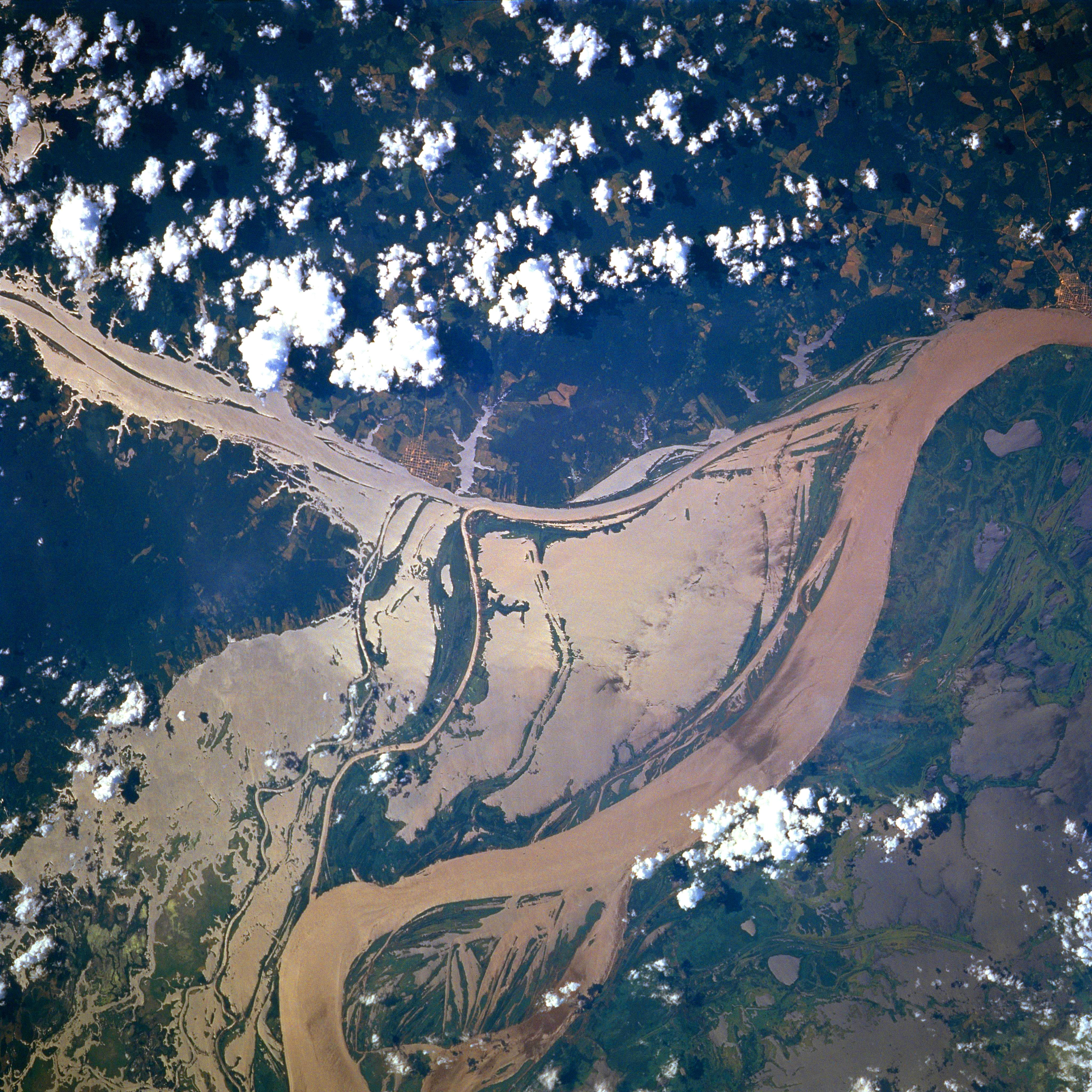
NASA satellite image of a flooded portion of the river

Not all of the Amazon's tributaries flood at the same time of the year. Many branches begin flooding in November and might continue to rise until June. The rise of the Rio Negro starts in February or March and begins to recede in June. The Madeira River rises and falls two months earlier than most of the rest of the Amazon river.

The depth of the Amazon between Manacapuru and Óbidos has been calculated as between 20 and 26 m (66 and 85 ft). At Manacapuru, the Amazon's water level is only about 24 m (79 ft) above mean sea level. More than half of the water in the Amazon downstream of Manacapuru is below sea level. In its lowermost section, the Amazon's depth averages 20 to 50 m (66 to 164 ft), in some places as much as 100 m (330 ft).

The main river is navigable for large ocean steamers to Manaus, 1,500 km (930 mi) upriver from the mouth. Smaller ocean vessels below 9,000 tons and with less than 5.5 m (18 ft) draft can reach as far as Iquitos, Peru, 3,600 km (2,200 mi) from the sea. Smaller riverboats can reach 780 km (480 mi) higher, as far as Achual Point. Beyond that, small boats frequently ascend to the Pongo de Manseriche, just above Achual Point in Peru.

Annual flooding occurs in late northern latitude winter at high tide when the incoming waters of the Atlantic are funnelled into the Amazon delta. The resulting undular tidal bore is called the pororoca, with a leading wave that can be up to 7.6 m (25 ft) high and travel up to 800 km (500 mi) inland.

== Geology ==
The Amazon River originated as a transcontinental river in the Miocene epoch between 11.8 million and 11.3 million years ago and took its present shape approximately 2.4 million years ago in the Early Pleistocene.

The proto-Amazon during the Cretaceous flowed west, as part of a proto-Amazon-Congo river system, from the interior of present-day Africa when the continents were connected, forming western Gondwana. 80 million years ago, the two continents split. Fifteen million years ago, the main tectonic uplift phase of the Andean chain started. This tectonic movement is caused by the subduction of the Nazca Plate underneath the South American Plate. The rise of the Andes and the linkage of the Brazilian and Guyana bedrock shields, blocked the river and caused the Amazon Basin to become a vast inland sea. Gradually, this inland sea became a massive swampy, freshwater lake and the marine inhabitants adapted to life in freshwater.

Eleven to ten million years ago, waters worked through the sandstone from the west and the Amazon began to flow eastward, leading to the emergence of the Amazon rainforest. During glacial periods, sea levels dropped and the great Amazon lake rapidly drained and became a river, which would eventually become the disputed world's longest, draining the most extensive area of rainforest on the planet.

Paralleling the Amazon River is a large aquifer, dubbed the Hamza River, the discovery of which was made public in August 2011.

== Protected areas ==
Name	Country	Coordinates	Image	Notes
Allpahuayo-Mishana National Reserve	Peru	3°56′S 73°33′W		
Amacayacu National Park	Colombia	3°29′S 72°12′W		
Amazônia National Park	Brazil	4°26′S 56°50′W		
Anavilhanas National Park	Brazil	2°23′S 60°55′W		

== Flora and fauna ==
=== Fauna ===
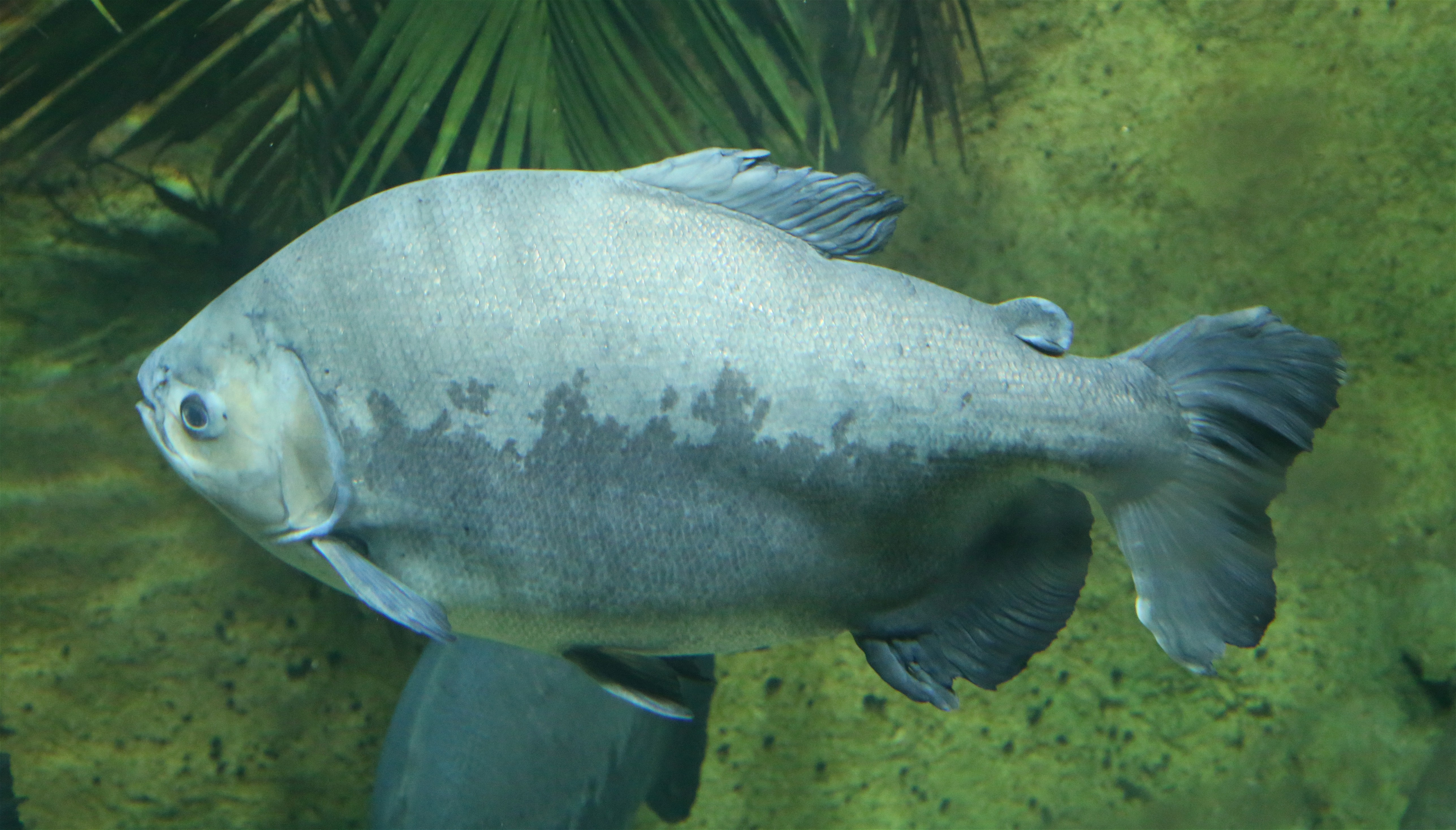
The tambaqui, an important species in Amazonian fisheries, breeds in the Amazon River.

More than 10% of all known species in the world live in the Amazon rainforest. It is the richest tropical forest in the world in terms of biodiversity. In addition to thousands of species of fish, the river supports crabs, algae, and turtles.

==== Mammals ====
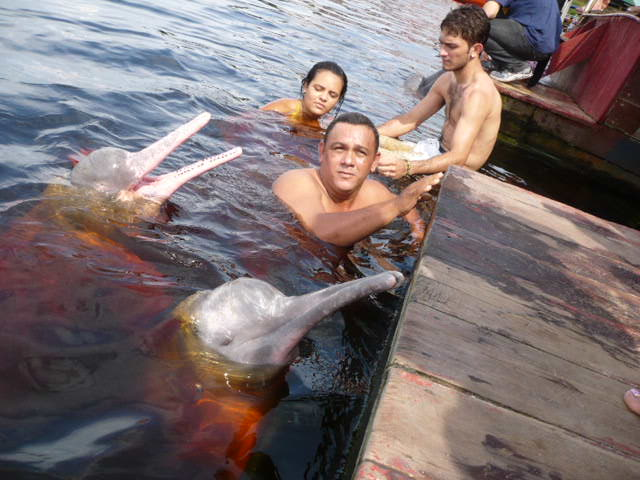
Amazon river dolphin

Along with the Orinoco, the Amazon is one of the main habitats of the boto, also known as the Amazon river dolphin (Inia geoffrensis). It is the largest species of river dolphin, and it can grow to lengths of up to 2.6 m (8.5 ft). The colour of its skin changes with age; young animals are gray, but become pink and then white as they mature. The dolphins use echolocation to navigate and hunt in the river's tricky depths. The boto is the subject of a legend in Brazil about a dolphin that turns into a man and seduces maidens by the riverside.

The tucuxi (Sotalia fluviatilis), also a dolphin species, is found both in the rivers of the Amazon basin and in the coastal waters of South America. The Amazonian manatee (Trichechus inunguis), also known as "seacow", is found in the northern Amazon River basin and its tributaries. It is a mammal and a herbivore. Its population is limited to freshwater habitats, and, unlike other manatees, it does not venture into saltwater. It is classified as vulnerable by the International Union for Conservation of Nature.

The Amazon and its tributaries are the main habitat of the giant otter (Pteronura brasiliensis). Sometimes known as the "river wolf," it is one of South America's top carnivores. Because of habitat destruction and hunting, its population has dramatically decreased. It is now listed on Appendix I of the Convention on International Trade in Endangered Species (CITES), which effectively bans international trade.

==== Reptiles ====
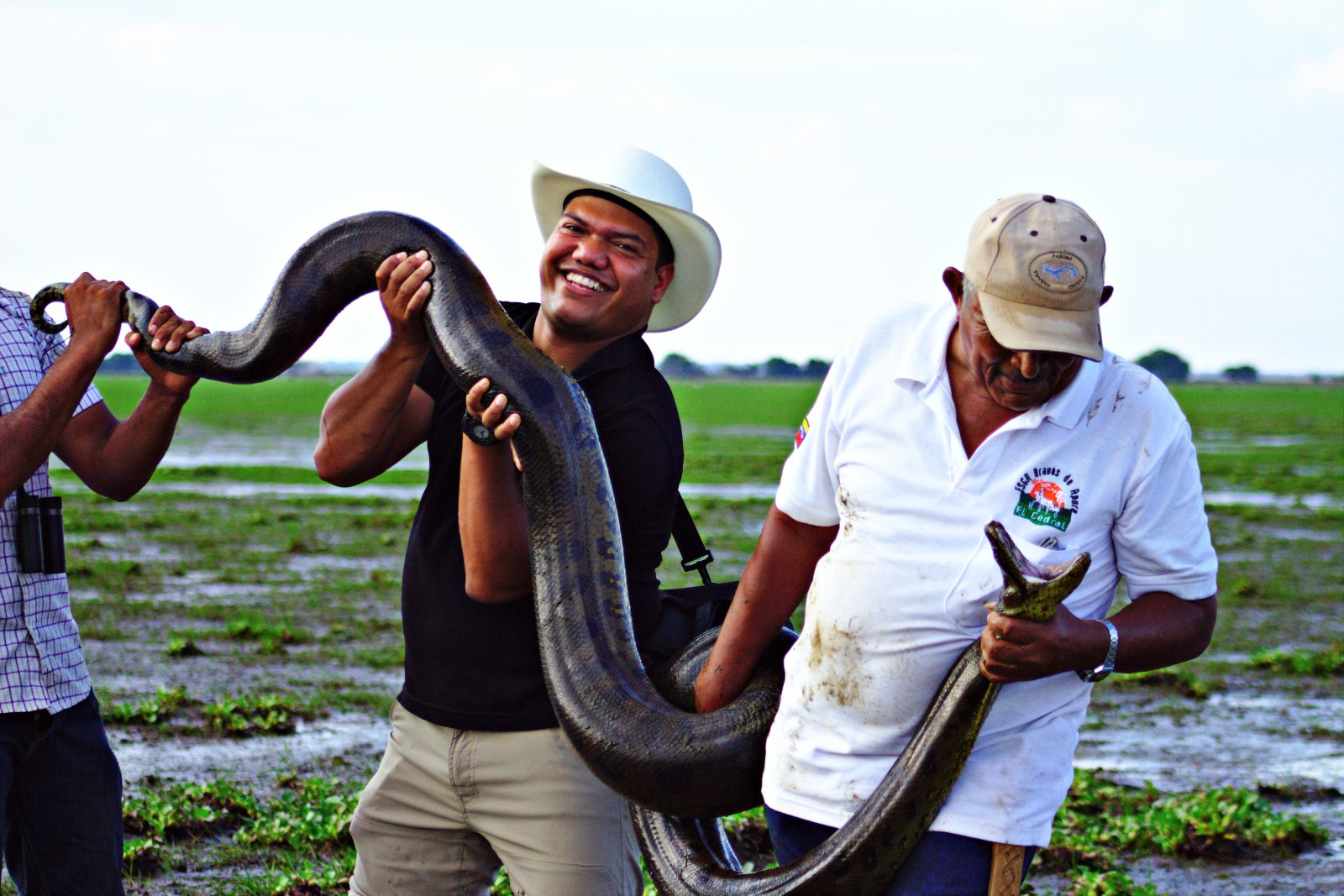
The green anaconda is the heaviest and one of the longest known extant snake species.

The anaconda is found in shallow waters in the Amazon basin. One of the world's largest species of snake, the anaconda spends most of its time in the water with just its nostrils above the surface. Species of caimans, that are related to alligators and other crocodilians, also inhabit the Amazon as do varieties of turtles.

==== Fish ====
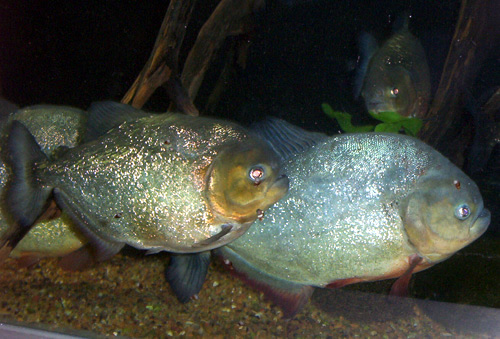
Characins, such as the piranha species, are prey for the giant otter, but these aggressive fish may also pose a danger to humans, although this is rare.

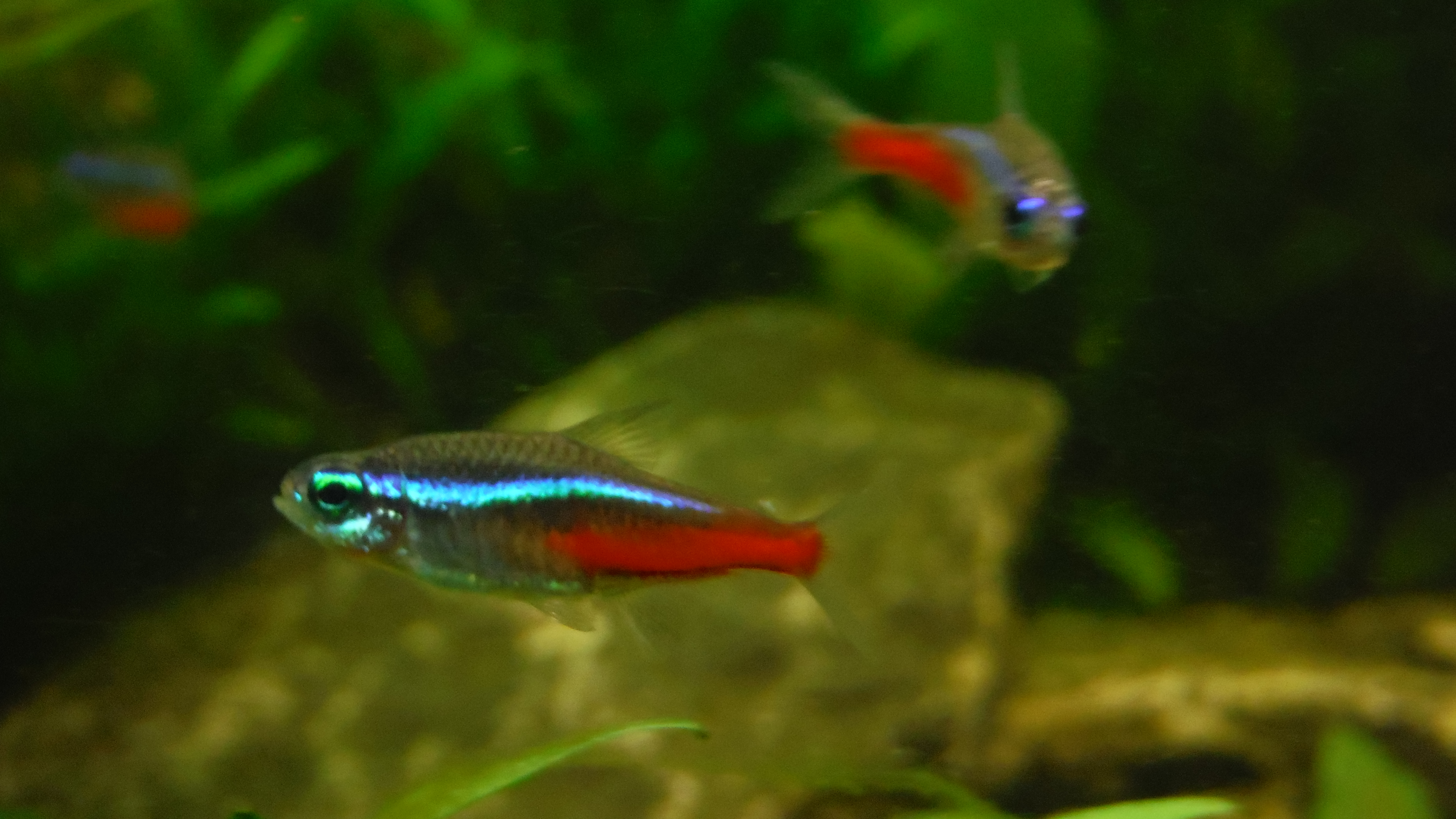
The neon tetra is one of the most popular aquarium fish.

The Amazonian fish fauna is the centre of diversity for neotropical fishes, some of which are popular aquarium specimens like the neon tetra and the freshwater angelfish. More than 5,600 species were known as of 2011, and approximately fifty new species are discovered each year. The arapaima, known in Brazil as the pirarucu, is a South American tropical freshwater fish, one of the largest freshwater fish in the world, with a length of up to 4.6 metres (15 ft). Another Amazonian freshwater fish is the arowana (or aruanã in Portuguese), such as the silver arowana (Osteoglossum bicirrhosum), which is a predator and very similar to the arapaima, but only reaches a length of 120 cm (47 in). Also present in large numbers is the notorious piranha, an omnivorous fish that congregates in large schools and may attack livestock. There are approximately 30 to 60 species of piranha. The candirú, native to the Amazon River, is a species of parasitic fresh water catfish in the family Trichomycteridae, just one of more than 1200 species of catfish in the Amazon basin. Other catfish 'walk' overland on their ventral fins, while the kumakuma (Brachyplatystoma filamentosum), aka piraiba or "goliath catfish", can reach 3.6 m (12 ft) in length and 200 kg (440 lb) in weight.

The electric eel (Electrophorus electricus) and more than 100 species of electric fishes (Gymnotiformes) inhabit the Amazon basin. River stingrays (Potamotrygonidae) are also known. The bull shark (Carcharhinus leucas), a euryhaline species which can thrive in both salt and fresh water, has been reported as far as 4,000 km (2,500 mi) up the Amazon River at Iquitos in Peru.

==== Microbiota ====
Freshwater microbes are generally not very well known, even less so for a pristine ecosystem like the Amazon. Recently, metagenomics has provided answers to what kind of microbes inhabit the river. The most important microbes in the Amazon River are Actinomycetota, Alphaproteobacteria, Betaproteobacteria, Gammaproteobacteria and Thermoproteota.

== Challenges ==
The Amazon River serves as a vital lifeline for more than 47 million people in its basin and faces a multitude of challenges that threaten both its ecosystem and the indigenous communities dependent on its resources. According to the Office of the United Nations High Commissioner for Human Rights (OHCHR), the Yanomami, a tribe of approximately 30,000, struggles to preserve their land, culture, and traditional way of life due to encroaching illegal gold miners, malnutrition, and malaria. Meanwhile, in 2022, the region's severe drought, has led to a devastating increase in water temperatures, reaching 39.1 degrees Celsius, causing the demise of 125 Amazon river dolphins. This event displays the deteriorating environmental conditions and indicates the increasing vulnerability of the river's ecosystem. In recent years, the Amazon River has experienced historically low water levels, the lowest in over a century. Brazil, the primary custodian of this invaluable natural resource, grapples with the challenges of mitigating the effects of this drought on communities and ecosystems, further emphasizing the urgency of sustainable environmental management and conservation efforts.

== Major tributaries ==
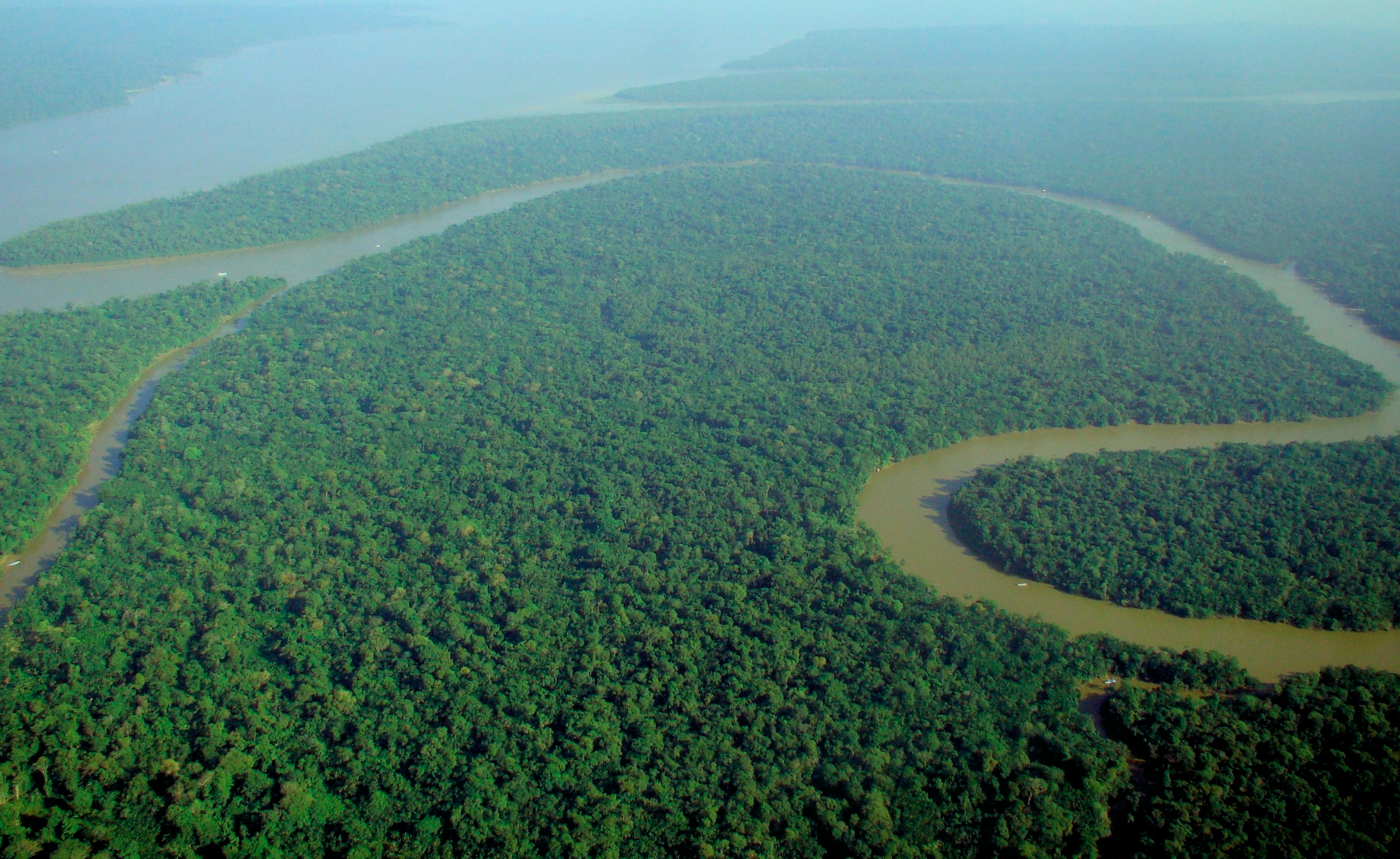
Solimões, the section of the upper Amazon River

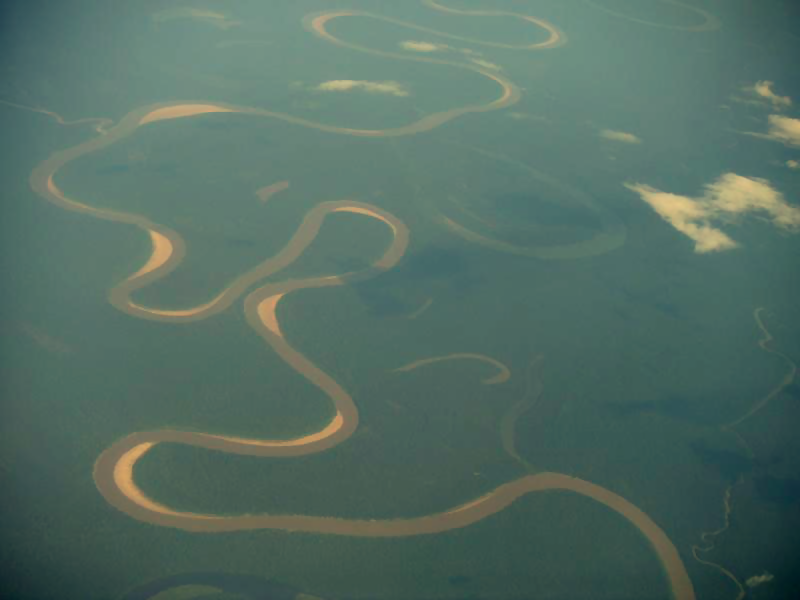
Aerial view of an Amazon tributary

The Amazon has over 1,100 tributaries, twelve of which are over 1,500 km (930 mi) long. Some of the more notable ones are:

- Branco
- Casiquiare canal
- Caquetá
- Huallaga
- Putumayo (or Içá River)
- Javary (or Yavarí)
- Juruá
- Madeira
- Marañón
- Morona
- Nanay
- Napo
- Negro
- Pastaza
- Purús
- Tambo
- Tapajós
- Tigre
- Tocantins
- Trombetas
- Ucayali
- Xingu
- Yapura

=== List of major tributaries ===
The main river and tributaries are (sorted in order from the confluence of Ucayali and Marañón rivers to the mouth)
Left	Right	Length (km)	Basin size (km^{2})	Average discharge (m^{3}/s)
River type: Whitewater / Clearwater / Blackwater
Upper Amazon (Confluence of Ucayali and Marañón rivers – Tabatinga)
Marañón		1,905	364,873.4	17,961.8
	Ucayali	2,738	353,729.3	13,630.1
	Tahuyo	80	1,630	105.7
	Tamshiyaçu	112	1,367.3	86.5
Itaya		213	2,668	161.4
Nanay		483	16,673.4	1,072.7
	Maniti	198.7	2,573.6	180.4
Napo		1,089	102,646.6	7,147.8
Apayaçu		203	2,393.6	160.9
	Orosa	95	3,506.8	234.3
Ampiyaçu		197	4,201.4	267.2
Chichita		48	1,314.2	87.7
	Cochiquinas	49	2,362.7	150.2
	Santa Rosa	45	1,678	101.5
Cajocumal		58	2,094.9	141.5
Atacuari		108	3,480.5	236.8
Middle Amazon (Tabatinga – Encontro das Águas)
	Javary	1,309	109,088	5,193.7
	Igarapé Veneza	50	943.9	58.3
Tacana		99	541	35.5
Igarapé de Belém		129	1,299.9	85.4
Igarapé São Jerônimo		74	1,259.6	78.2
	Jandiatuba	716	14,127.7	745
	Igarapé Acuruy	76	2,462.1	127.1
Içá		2,005	121,115.8	8,183.9
Tonantins		165	2,955.2	169.2
	Jutaí	1,174	78,451.5	3,700.9
	Juruá	3,283	189,725.5	6,662.1
	Uarini	233	7,195.8	432.9
Japurá		2,816	270,155.7	17,904.1
	Tefé	571	24,375.5	1,190.4
	Caiambe		2,650.1	90
Parana Copea		348	10,532.3	611.3
	Coari	599	35,741.3	1,389.3
	Mamiá		5,514	176.2
Badajos		413	19,737.1	1,300
Igarapé Miuá			1,294.5	56.9
	Purus	3,361	378,762.4	10,877.2
Paraná Arara			1,915.7	78.2
	Paraná Manaquiri		1,318.6	52.9
Manacapuru		291	14,103	559.5
Lower Amazon (Encontro das Águas – Gurupá)
Rio Negro		2,362	714,577.6	29,612.8
Prêto da Eva		142	3,039.5	110.8
	Autaz-Açu	236	45,994.4	1,676.5
	Madeira	3,518	1,322,782.4	32,531.9
Urubu		430	13,892	459.8
Uatumã		701	69,150	2,290.8
	Paraná do Ramos	132	133,361.1	4,804.4
Trombetas, Nhamundá		744	156,960.3	4,097.3
Curuá		484	26,310.7	428.6
	Lago Grande do Curuaí		3,293.6	92.7
	Tapajós	2,291	494,551.3	14,787.7
	Curuá-Una	315	31,252.9	729.8
Maicurú		546	16,797.1	272.3
	Uruará	75	4,610.2	104.8
Jauari		163	5,851	108.3
	Guajará	150	4,243	105.6
Paru de Este		731	39,383.8	704.1
	Xingu	2,324	512,178.8	9,977.5
Igarapé Arumanduba			1,819.9	50.8
Jari		877	51,893	1,190
Amazon Delta (Gurupá – Estuary)
Braco do Cajari		250	4,732.4	157.1
	Pará	784	84,027	3,500.3
	Tocantins	2,639	777,308	11,920.7
Atuã		71	2,769	119.8
	Anajás	300	24,082.5	948
Mazagão			1,250.2	44.4
Vila Nova		166	5,383.8	180.8
Matapi		96	2,487.4	81.7
	Guamá, Acará	400	87,389.5	2,550.7
Arari		128	1,523.6	80.2
Pedreira		95	2,005	89.9
	Paracauari	70	1,390.3	67.9
Jupati			724.2	32.6
Notes: Hydro-SHEDS data, 1971–2000

=== List by length ===
No.	River	Country	Length (km)	No.	River	Country	Length (km)
River type: Whitewater / Clearwater / Blackwater
1	Amazon	(Peru) (Colombia) (Brazil)	^{(1)}6,575	16	Branco	(Brazil)	^{(8)}1,454
2	Madeira	(Bolivia) (Brazil)	^{(2)}3,518	17	Apaporis	(Colombia) (Brazil)	1,425
3	Purus	(Peru) (Brazil)	3,361	18	Vaupés	(Colombia) (Brazil)	1,381
4	Juruá	(Peru) (Brazil)	3,283	19	Javary	(Peru) (Brazil)	1,309
5	Japurá	(Colombia) (Brazil)	2,816	20	Canumã	(Brazil)	^{(9)}1,304
6	Tocantins	(Brazil)	^{(3)}2,639	21	Orthon	(Bolivia)	^{(10)}1,293
7	Araguaia	(Brazil)	2,627	22	Juruena	(Brazil)	1,240
8	Negro	(Colombia) (Venezuela) (Brazil)	^{(4)}2,362	23	Madre de Dios	(Peru) (Bolivia)	1,210
9	Xingu	(Brazil)	^{(5)}2,324	24	Aripuanã	(Brazil)	1,175
10	Tapajós	(Brazil)	^{(6)}2,291	25	Jutaí	(Brazil)	1,174
11	Içá	(Ecuador) (Peru) (Colombia) (Brazil)	2,005	26	Huallaga	(Peru)	1,169
12	Marañón	(Peru)	1,905	27	Iriri	(Brazil)	1,151
13	Guaporé	(Bolivia) (Brazil)	1,749	28	Napo	(Ecuador) (Peru)	^{(11)}1,089
14	Itonamas	(Bolivia)	1,700	29	Tigre	(Ecuador) (Peru)	1,087
15	Beni	(Bolivia)	^{(7)}1,609
Notes:^{(1)}Amazon–Ucayali–Tambo–Ené–Apurímac • ^{(2)}Madeira–Mamoré–Río Grande–Caine–Rocha • ^{(3)}Tocantins–Maranhão • ^{(4)}Negro–Guainía • ^{(5)}Xingu–Culuene • ^{(6)}Tapajós–Teles Pires • ^{(7)}Beni–Cotacajes • ^{(8)}Branco–Uraricoera • ^{(9)}Paraná do Ramos–Paraná do Urariá–Canumã–Sucunduri • ^{(10)}Orthon–Tahuamanu • ^{(11)}Napo–Jatunyaçu

=== List by inflow to the Amazon ===
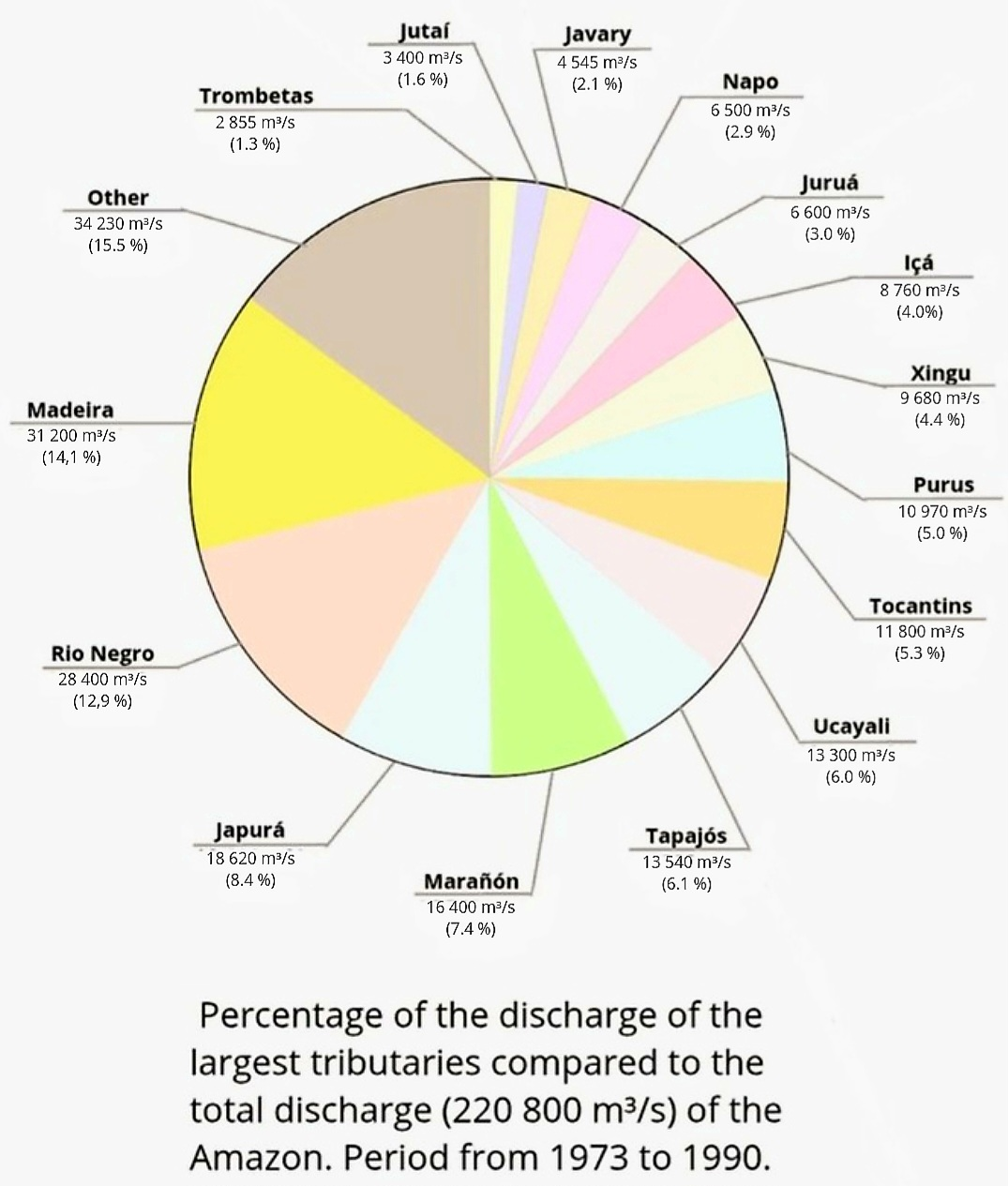
Ratio of water discharge of the main tributaries

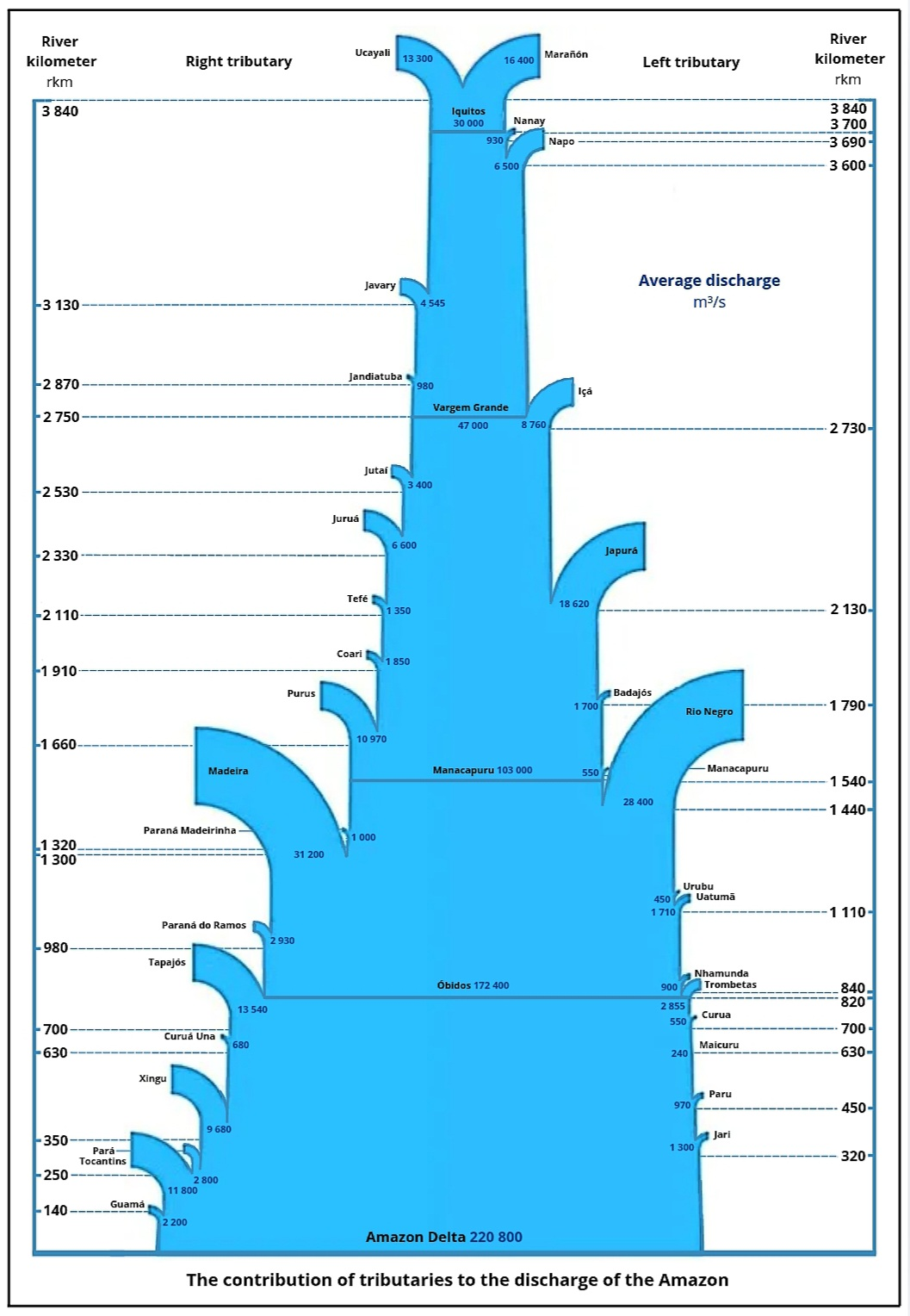
Contribution of tributary discharge to the Amazon

No.	River name		Q	Q^{%}	S	S^{%}
No.	Left	Right	Q	Q^{%}	S	S^{%}
River type
		Whitewater	Clearwater	Blackwater
	Amazon		220,800	100.0	1,200	100.0
1		Madeira	31,200	14.1	488	40.7
2	Negro		28,400	12.9	8	0.7
3	Japurá		18,620	8.4	33	2.75
4	Marañón		16,400	7.4	145	12.1
5		Tapajós	13,540	6.1	6	0.5
6		Ucayali	13,300	6.0	305	25.4
7		Tocantins	11,800	5.3	17	1.4
8		Purus	10,970	5.0	47	3.9
9		Xingu	9,680	4.4	9	0.75
10	Içá		8,760	4.0	19	1.6
11		Juruá	6,600	3.0	35	2.9
12	Napo		6,500	2.9	49	4.1
13		Javary	4,545	2.1	5	0.4
14		Jutaí	3,400	1.6	2	0.17
15	Trombetas		2,855	1.3	0.3	0.02
Q – Average discharge, m³/s (period from 1973 to 1990) • Q^{%} – % of Amazon total discharge • S – Sediment load, 10⁶ ton/year • S^{%} – % of Amazon total sediment load

== See also ==
- Amazon natural region, in Colombia
- Peruvian Amazonia in Peru
