= Hypancistrus yudja =

Scientific classification
- Kingdom: Animalia
- Phylum: Chordata
- Class: Actinopterygii
- Order: Siluriformes
- Family: Loricariidae
- Genus: Hypancistrus
- Species: H. yudja

Binomial name
- Hypancistrus yudja Sousa, Sousa, Oliveira, Sabaj Pérez, Zuanon & Rapp Py-Daniel, 2025

Species of catfish

Hypancistrus yudja, the ozelot pleco, is a species of freshwater ray-finned fish belonging to the family Loricariidae, the suckermouth armoured catfishes, and the subfamily Hypostominae, the suckermouth catfishes. This catfish is endemic to Brazil.

== Taxonomy ==
Hypancistrus yudja was first formally described in 2025 by the Brazilian ichthyologists Leandro Melo de Sousa, Erilda Barbosa de Sousa, Renildo de Oliveira Ribeiro, Mark Henry Sabaj Pérez, Jansen Zuanon and Lucia Helena Rapp Py-Daniel with its type locality given as the Xingu River's, main channel along the right bank at the site of the Pimental Dam, roughly 37 km (23 mi) southeast of Altamira in Pará, at 03°25'55.3"S, 51°57'23.6"W. This species is classified in the genus Hypancistrus which is classified in the subfamily Hypostominae, the suckermouth catfishes, of the family Loricariidae, the suckermouth armoured catfishes, which is part of the suborder Loricarioidei within the catfish order Siluriformes. This genus has also been classified in the tribe Ancistrini by some authorities.

== Etymology ==
Hypancistrus yudja is classified in the genus Hypancistrus, a name which is a combination of the Greek term "hypo", which means "somewhat" or "little", with Ancistrus, the type genus of the tribe Ancistrini, and is an allusion to Hypancistrus zebra, the type species, having fewer teeth than that genus. The specific name, yudja, refers to the group of indigenous people known as the Yudjá or Juruna who live in the vicinity of the Volta Grande do Xingu, these people dived to catch this species from the deep waters for the aquarium trade and both the people and the catfish are threatened by the construction of the Belo Monte hydroelectric complex.

== Description ==
Hypancistrus yudja has 2 spines and 7 soft rays in its dorsal fin and a single spine and 3 or 4 soft rays in its anal fin. It can be told apart from other species in the genus by its tan background colour marked with brown saddle marks and blotches. This species reaches a standard length of 4.2 cm (1.7 in) and has a body with an angular cross section.

== Distribution and habitat ==
Hypancistrus yudja is only known from a 75km streth of the Xingu River at the Volta Grande do Xingu in Pará. It occurs at depths below 15 m (49 ft) in the deepest parts of the Xingu's main channel, hiding among lateritic conglomerates.

== Conservation status ==
Hypancistrus yudja has not been assessed by the International Union for Conservation of Nature but the species authors state that it could be classified as Crtically Endangered beuase almost all of its known range is affected by the construction of the Belo Monte Dam, drastically affecting the population of this fish.

== Utilisation ==
Hypancistrus yudja is known in the aquarium trade, and has been bred in captivity. In the aquarium hobby this species is also known bt the referencenumber L174 and as the spotted zebra pleco, while another common name is false zebra pleco.
