= Yaluwak =

Scientific classification
- Kingdom: Animalia
- Phylum: Chordata
- Class: Actinopterygii
- Division: Teleostei
- Order: Siluriformes
- Family: Loricariidae
- Subfamily: Hypostominae
- Genus: Yaluwak; Lujan, Armbruster & Werneke, 2020
- Species: Y. primus

Binomial name
- Yaluwak primus Lujan, Armbruster & Werneke, 2020

Genus of fishes

Yaluwak is a monospecific genus of freshwater ray-finned fish belonging to the family Loricariidae, the suckermouth armoured catfishes, and the subfamily Hypostominae, the suckermouth catfishes. The only species in the genus is Yaluwak primus, a species which is endemic to Guyan. It was first described in a 2020 study and placed within the tribe Ancistrini.

== Description ==
Yaluwak primus, like other Loricariids, has plates of armor on its body and a suckermouth. Small odontodes are also present along the body, but are absent from the preopercle and the dorsal two-thirds of the opercle.

The genus can be distinguished from the Hypostominae genera Corymbophanes, Hypostomus and Pterygoplichthys, and from all non-Hypostominae loricariids, by having a cluster of >25 evertible cheek odontodes (vs. cheek odontodes absent or <10); and from all other members of the Hypostominae, except some Ancistrus species, Araichthys loro Zawadzki et al., 2016, Chaetostoma carrioni (Norman, 1935) and Leptoancistrus, by lacking an adipose fin, having instead a low ridge of azygous plates. Yaluwak can be distinguished from all Ancistrus species and Chaetostoma carrioni by its having a fully plated snout, from Araichthys loro by having a taller caudal peduncle and longer tooth rows, and from Leptoancistrus by lacking cheek odontodes that extend past the cleithrum and having dorsal fin ii,7 (vs. ii,8). Yaluwak is also differentiable from Corymbophanes by its larger maximum body size.

This species is considered a medium-sized loricariid, with the largest specimen examined measuring 122.9 mm Standard Length.

The coloration of the species is light brown mottling on a dark brown base, with a pale white abdomen covered with light brown or grey stippling around the margins and posterior to pectoral girdle. Fins are lighter distally than proximally. The pectoral fin has spots on spine and faint or no spots on rays; rays are darker than membranes; fin is especially dark at base and along spine and first branched ray. Pelvic, dorsal and anal fins have small dark spots on rays and dorsal spine; rays are considerably darker than membranes; dorsal fin has black band at distal edge. Caudal fin has dark spots centred on rays, but combine to form bands proximally; number of bands is higher in larger specimen. Iris is brick red.

== Distribution and habitat ==
Yaluway is only known from the uppermost rapids of Sukwabi Creek, an eastern arm of the Ireng River (Brazil: Rio Maú), just below Wotowanda Falls. Other similar habitat exists below the nearby Andu Falls and Uluk Tuwuk Falls, and it seems likely that the species also occurs there, if not also in similar habitats further downstream.
