= Hypancistrus seideli =

Scientific classification
- Kingdom: Animalia
- Phylum: Chordata
- Class: Actinopterygii
- Order: Siluriformes
- Family: Loricariidae
- Genus: Hypancistrus
- Species: H. seideli

Binomial name
- Hypancistrus seideli Sousa, Sousa, Oliveira, Sabaj Pérez, Zuanon & Rapp Py-Daniel, 2025

Species of catfish

Hypancistrus seideli is a species of freshwater ray-finned fish belonging to the family Loricariidae, the suckermouth armoured catfishes, and the subfamily Hypostominae, the suckermouth catfishes. This catfish is endemic to Brazil.

== Taxonomy ==
Hypancistrus seideli was first formally described in 2025 by the Brazilian ichthyologists Leandro Melo de Sousa, Erilda Barbosa de Sousa, Renildo de Oliveira Ribeiro, Mark Henry Sabaj Pérez, Jansen Zuanon and Lucia Helena Rapp Py-Daniel with its type locality given as Vitória do Xingu, Itaubinha, pedral, Pará, at 02°53'21"S, 51°56'26"W. This species is classified in the genus Hypancistrus which is classified in the subfamily Hypostominae, the suckermouth catfishes, of the family Loricariidae, the suckermouth armoured catfishes, which is part of the suborder Loricarioidei within the catfish order Siluriformes. This genus has also been classified in the tribe Ancistrini by some authorities.

== Etymology ==
Hypancistrus seideli is classified in the genus Hypancistrus, a name which is a combination of the Greek term "hypo", which means "somewhat" or "little", with Ancistrus, the type genus of the tribe Ancistrini, and is an allusion to Hypancistrus zebra, the type species, having fewer teeth than that genus. The specific name, seideli, honours the German aquarist Ingo Seidel, a global authority on the care, breeding and knowledge of the catfishes in the genus Hypancistrus.

== Description ==
Hypancistrus seideli has 2 spines and 7 soft rays in its dorsal fin and between 3 and 5 soft rays in its anal fin. It can be told apart from other species in the genus by its colour and pattern, the head body and fins have dark and pale vermiculations while the fins have between 6 and 10 bars on them. This species reaches a standard length of 11.7 cm (4.6 in) and has a body with an angular cross section.

== Distribution and habitat ==
Hypancistrus seideli is endemic to Brazil where occurs throughout the lower Xingu channel from the extreme downstream part of the Volta Grande do Xingu bend to the confluence with the Amazon River in Pará. It may also occur in other Amazon tributaries but these need further investigation to ascertain their identification. This species lives in the widest variety of habitats known for its genus. Its known depth range varies from less than 1 m (3 ft 3 in) down to 40 m (130 ft), and they may live among habitats from granitoid boulders to sedimentary rocks of a vareiety of shapes and sizes. They may be found in fast currents at the downstream end of the Volta Grande do Xingu, as well as in slow currents in the bay at the Lower Xingu mouth>

== Utilisation ==
Hypancistrus seideli is found in the aquarium trade where it is known as the king tiger pleco or L066.
