= Blackwater river =

Slow, dark river in forested swamps or wetlands

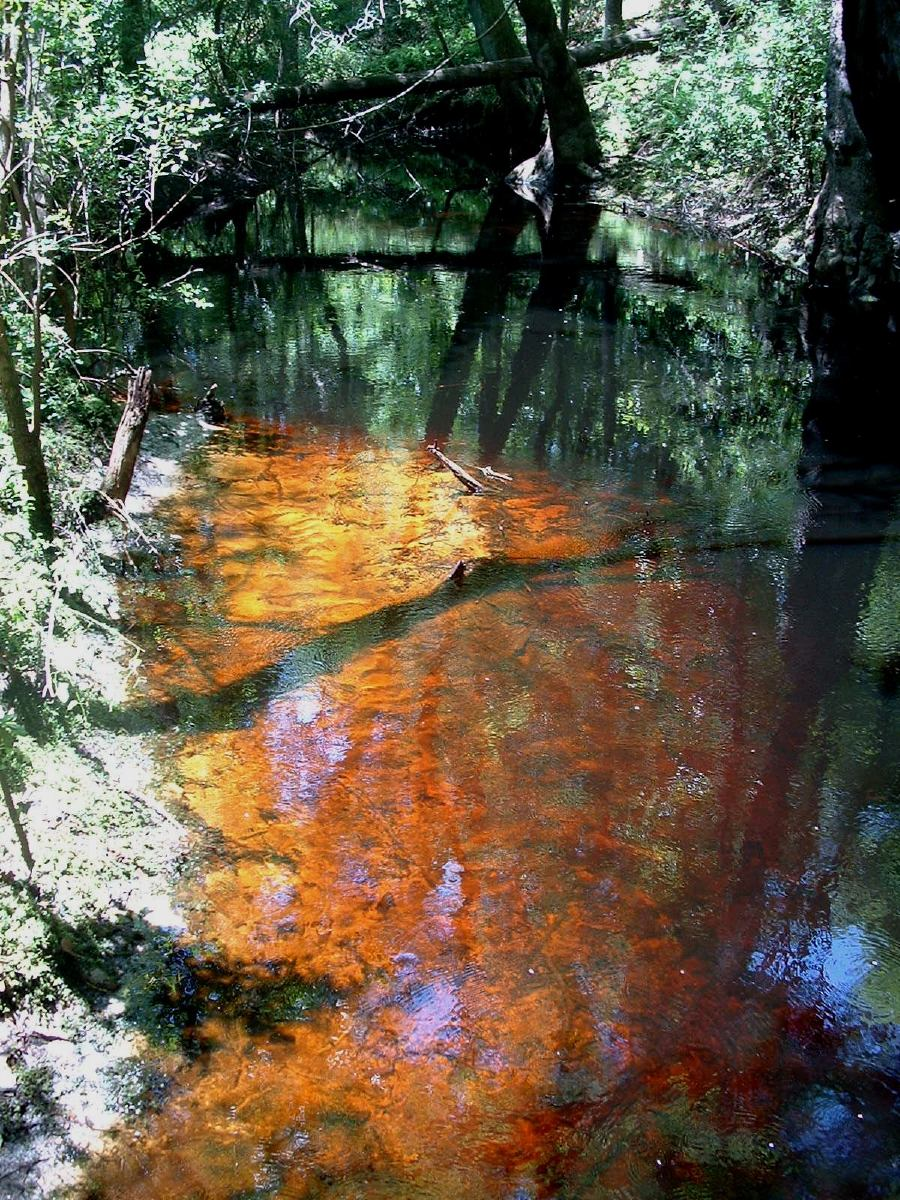
A swamp-fed stream in northern Florida, showing tannin-stained undisturbed blackwater

A blackwater river is a type of river with a slow-moving channel flowing through forested swamps or wetlands. Most major blackwater rivers are in the Amazon Basin and the Southern United States. The term is used in fluvial studies, geology, geography, ecology, and biology. Not all dark rivers are blackwater in that technical sense. Some rivers in temperate regions, which drain or flow through areas of dark black loam, are simply black due to the color of the soil; these rivers are black mud rivers. There are also black mud estuaries.

Blackwater rivers are lower in nutrients than whitewater rivers and have ionic concentrations higher than rainwater. The unique conditions lead to flora and fauna that differ from both whitewater and clearwater rivers. The classification of Amazonian rivers into black, clear, and whitewater was first proposed by Alfred Russel Wallace in 1853 based on water colour, but the types were more clearly defined by chemistry and physics by Harald Sioli from the 1950s to the 1980s. Although many Amazonian rivers fall clearly into one of these categories, others show a mix of characteristics and may vary depending on season and flood levels.

== Comparison between white and black waters ==
Table 1: Mean ionic composition, specific conductivity (μS/cm), and pH in Amazon waters.
	Solimões or Amazon River – whitewater	Rio Negro – blackwater
Na (mg/L)	2.3 ± 0.8	0.380 ± 0.124
K (mg/L)	0.9 ± 0.2	0.327 ± 0.107
Mg (mg/L)	1.1 ± 0.2	0.114 ± 0.035
Ca (mg/L)	7.2 ± 1.6	0.212 ± 0.066
Cl (mg/L)	3.1 ± 2.1	1.7 ± 0.7
Si (mg/L)	4.0 ± 0.9	2.0 ± 0.5
Sr (μg/L)	37.8 ± 8.8	3.6 ± 1.0
Ba (μg/L)	22.7 ± 5.9	8.1 ± 2.1
Al (μg/L)	44 ± 37	112 ± 29
Fe (μg/L)	109 ± 76	178 ± 58
Mn (μg/L)	5.9 ± 5.1	9.0 ± 2.4
Cu (μg/L)	2.4 ± 0.6	1.8 ± 0.5
Zn (μg/L)	3.2 ± 1.5	4.1 ± 1.8
Conductivity	57 ± 8	9 ± 2
pH	6.9 ± 0.4	5.1±0.6
Total P (μg/L)	105 ± 58	25 ± 17
Total C (mg/L)	13.5 ± 3.1	10.5 ± 1.3
HCO_{3}-C (mg/L)	6.7 ± 0.8	1.7 ± 0.5

Black and white waters differ significantly in their ionic composition, as shown in Table 1. Black waters are more acidic, resulting in an aluminum concentration greater than that of the more neutral white waters. The major difference is the concentrations of sodium, magnesium, calcium, and potassium; these are very low in black waters. This has ecological implications. Some animals need more calcium than is available in blackwaters, so for example, snails, which need much calcium to build shells, are not abundant in blackwaters. The lack of dissolved ions in black waters results in a low conductivity, similar to that of rainwater.

Black and white waters differ in their planktonic fauna and flora. Tables 2 and 3 compare the number of planktonic animals caught in black and white water localities only a few meters apart. The black water was not as extreme an example as the Rio Negro system. However, it can be seen that the black water held greater numbers of rotifers but fewer crustaceans and mites. These crustaceans are important foods for larval fish. The zones where the two waters mix are attractive to ostracods and young fish. These mixing zones tend to have many animals. The abundance is shown in Table 3, which compares animals in 10 litres (2.2 imp gal; 2.6 US gal) of water.

Table 2: Planktonic organisms collected in black (Japura) and white (Solimões) waters.
Animal groups present	Black water	Mixed water	White water
Rotifera	284	23	0
Cladocera	5	29	43
Ostracoda	39	97	29
Calanoida	11	51	66
Cyclopoida	22	49	61
Chironomidae	0	3	3
Acari (mites)	0	0	2

Table 3: Number of planktonic organisms collected in 10 L of black, white, and mixed waters.
	Black water		Mixed water		White water	
Animal groups present	Open water	Forest	Open water	Forest	Open water	Forest
Volvocaceae	42		38			
Rotifera	87	5	34			
Cladocera	6		5		8	1
Ostracoda	2	11	3		7	
Calanoida	23	3	10			
Cyclopoida	5	27	19	1	13	1
Mysidacea		1				
Diptera					1	
Acari (mites)			1		1	
Larval fish			1		1	

== Comparison between clear and black waters ==
Blackwater rivers resemble clearwater rivers in having a low conductivity and relatively low levels of dissolved solids, but clearwater rivers have water that often only is somewhat acidic (typical pH ~6.5) and very clear with a greenish color. The main Amazonian clearwater rivers have their source in the Brazilian Plateau (such as Tapajós, Tocantins, Xingu and some right tributaries of the Madeira), but some originate in the Guiana Shield (such as Nhamundá, Paru, and Araguari).

== Blackwater rivers of the world ==
=== Amazonia ===
- Apaporis River: a tributary of the Japurá River
- Arapiuns River: a tributary of the Tapajós River
- Coari River
- Mazaruni River
- Mirití-Paraná River
- Piorini River
- Potaro River: a tributary of the Mazaruni River
- Rio Negro: The largest blackwater river in the world; one of the largest Amazonian tributaries.
- Tahuayo River
- Tefé River
- Uatumã River
- Urubu River
- Vaupés River

=== Orinoco basin ===
- Morichal Largo River
- Atabapo River: from the Guiana highlands of Venezuela west into the Orinoco
- Caroní River: from the Guiana Highlands of Venezuela north into the Orinoco.
- Caura River: from the Guiana Highlands of Venezuela north into the Orinoco
- Inírida River: from Colombia northeast into the Guaviare River which flows into the Orinoco
- Ventuari River: from eastern Venezuela southwest into the Orinoco
- Vichada River: from Colombia east into the Orinoco
- Tomo River: from Colombia east into the Orinoco
- Tuparro River: from Colombia east into the Orinoco

=== Southern United States ===
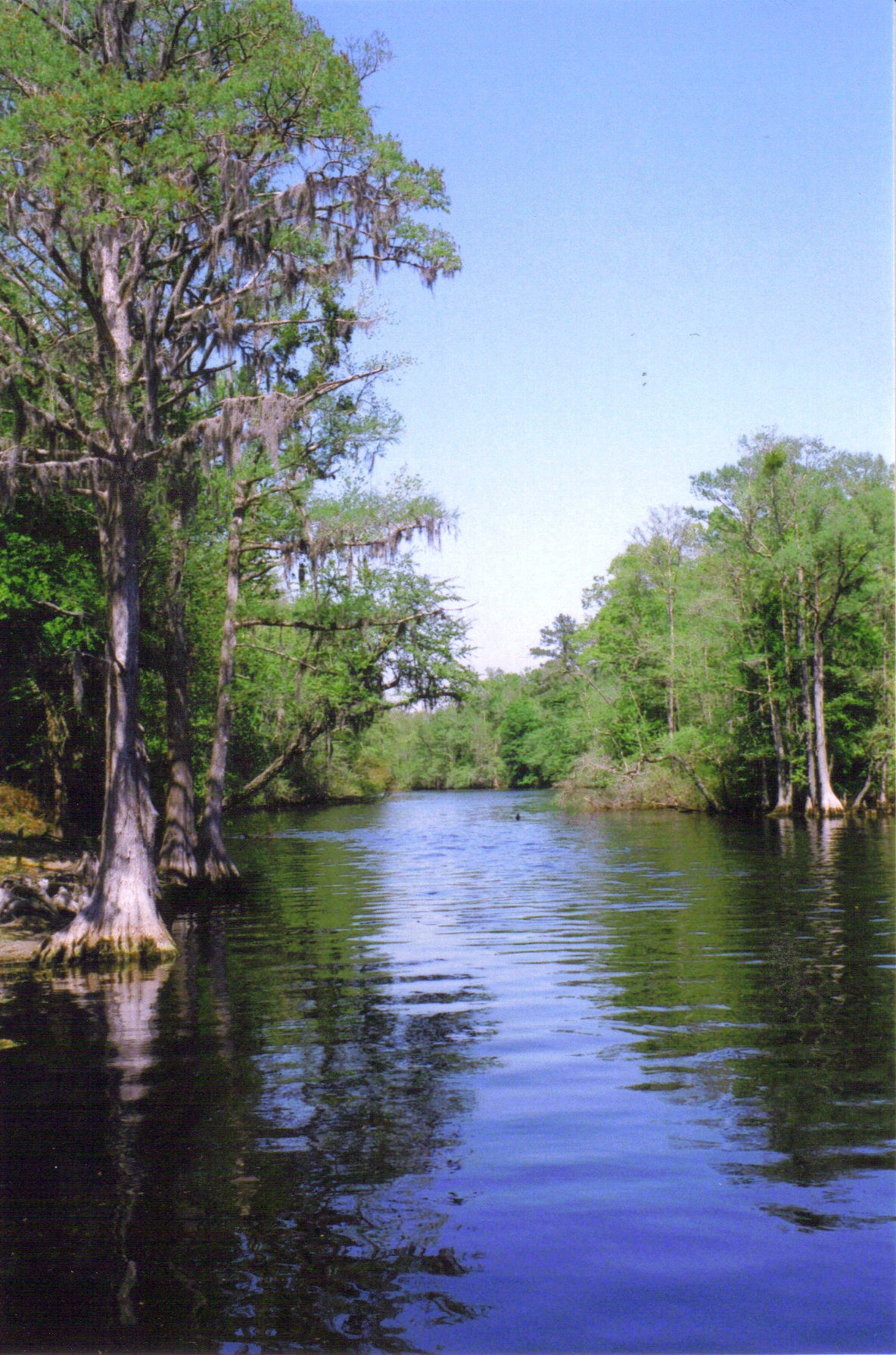
The Lumber River as seen from the boat launch at Princess Ann near Orrum, North Carolina

- Aucilla River: located in northern Florida and southern Georgia
- Ashepoo River: along with the Edisto and the Combahee Rivers in South Carolina makes up the ACE Basin National Wildlife Refuge.
- Big Cypress, Black Cypress, and Little Cypress and the small rivers in the watershed of Caddo Lake in Texas and Louisiana
- Blackwater River: a tributary of the Chowan River in Virginia
- Blackwater River: a major river in the western Florida panhandle
- Blackwater River, West Virginia: Located in the Blackwater Canyon in Tucker County. Blackwater Falls, a five-story waterfall, is located along this river with rapids ranging from Class III-V+.
- Black River: a tributary of the Pee Dee River in North and South Carolina
- Cape Fear River, North Carolina: flows into the Atlantic Ocean.
- Cashie River, North Carolina: flows into Albemarle Sound.
- Caloosahatchee River, Florida: flows west from Lake Okeechobee to the Gulf of Mexico.
- Chowan River, North Carolina: flows into Albemarle Sound.
- Edisto River, South Carolina: flows into the Atlantic Ocean.
- Econlockhatchee River, a tributary of the St. Johns River in Central Florida.
- Forked Deer River: located in West Tennessee
- Four Hole Swamp, a tributary of the Edisto River in South Carolina.
- Little Manatee River, Florida: flows into Tampa Bay.
- Great Coharie Creek, North Carolina: flows into the Black River.
- Little Pee Dee River, South Carolina: flows into the Pee Dee River.
- Lynches River, South Carolina: flows into the Pee Dee River.
- Lumber/Drowning Creek: located in North and South Carolina. Part of Lumber River State Park
- Myakka River: 66 mile-long river with its headwaters in Manatee County, Florida. The Myakka River discharges into Charlotte Harbor.
- Obion River: located in Northwest Tennessee
- Ochlockonee River: a river in northern Florida
- Ogeechee River: a 245-mile river in eastern Georgia that passes to the south of the city of Savannah and enters the Atlantic Ocean at Ossabaw Sound.
- Ohoopee River: a 119-mile-long (192 km) river in east-central Georgia. It is a tributary of the Altamaha River, which flows to the Atlantic Ocean.
- Pasquotank River: a river in Northeastern North Carolina. Located between Camden and Pasquotank counties, the Pasquotank connects directly to the Albemarle Sound and is part of the Intracoastal Waterway via Elizabeth City.
- Peace River: located in central Florida, flows into Charlotte Harbor.
- Pithlachascotee River: a small river in central Florida
- Pocomoke River: a river in southern Delaware and southeastern Maryland on the Delmarva Peninsula. The river is a tributary to the Chesapeake Bay.
- Santa Fe River: a river in northern Florida
- Satilla River: a river in southeast Georgia that flows through the city of Waycross and empties into the Atlantic Ocean near Cumberland Island.
- Scuppernong River: a small river in Washington and Tyrrell Counties in eastern North Carolina at Pettigrew State Park
- Sopchoppy River: a river in northern Florida
- St. Mary's River (Florida–Georgia): a 130-mile river located in southeast Georgia and is bordered by the Satilla River Basin to the north and the Suwannee River Basin to the west.
- St. Johns River: The largest river in Florida. Flows north through Jacksonville and into the Atlantic.
- St. Sebastian River, Indian River County, Florida.
- Suwannee River: a large river in southern Georgia and northern Florida flowing into the Gulf of Mexico
- Upper Little River, North Carolina: flows into the Cape Fear River.
- Upper Nanticoke River, Delaware and Maryland: flows into the Chesapeake Bay.
- Village Creek, a 63 Mile long stream in the Big Thicket region of southeast Texas: flows into the Neches River.
- Waccamaw River, North and South Carolina: flows into the Atlantic Ocean.
- White Oak River, North Carolina: flows into the Atlantic Ocean.
- Wolf River: arises in Northern Mississippi and runs through southwest Tennessee/Memphis into Mississippi River

=== Northern United States ===
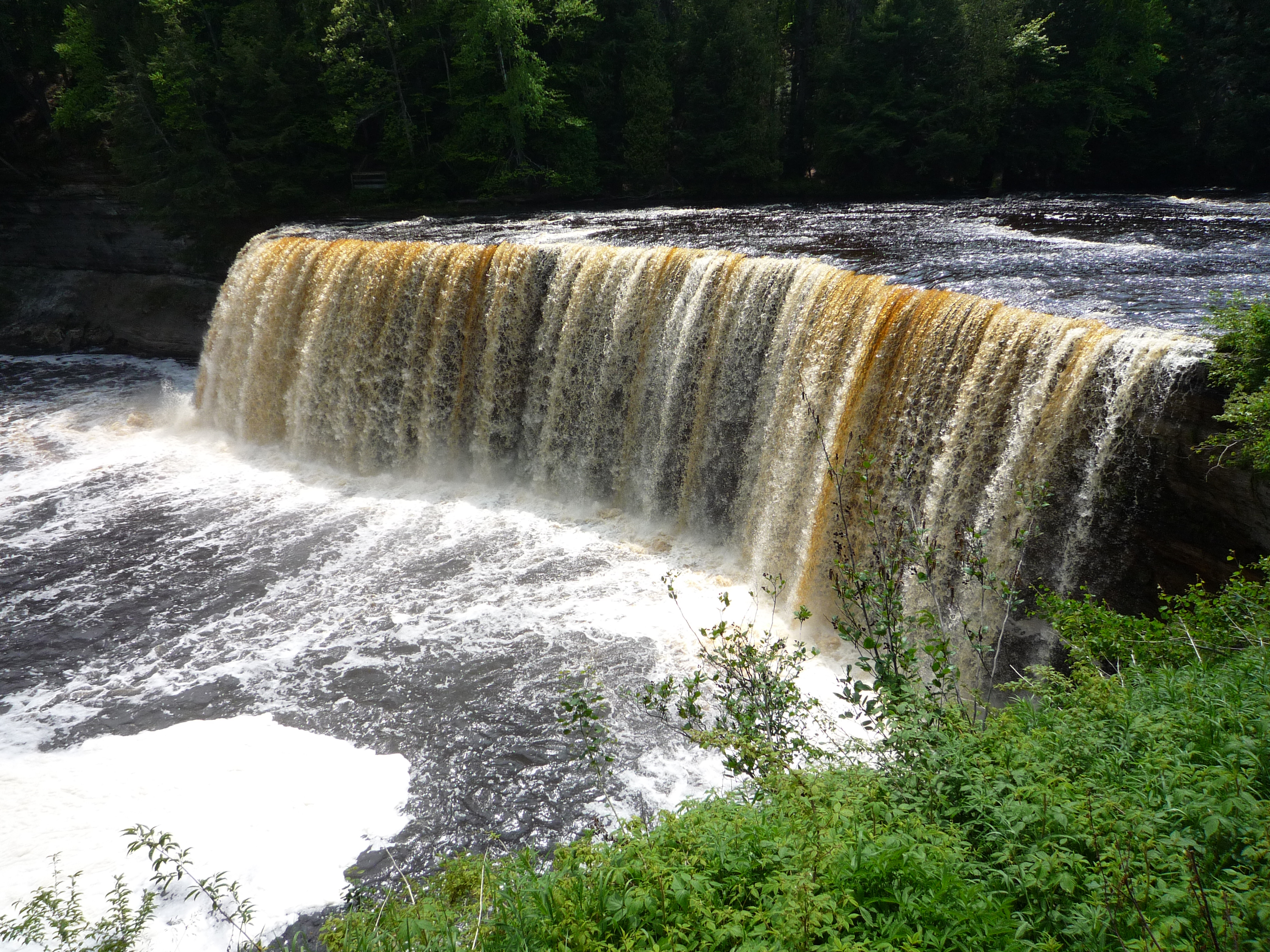
Tea-colored Tahquamenon Falls

- Black River, New York: a river starting in the western Adirondacks that flows into Lake Ontario.
- Black River (Gogebic County), Michigan: a river in the far western Upper Peninsula that flows into Lake Superior. The northern section of the river is listed as a National Wild and Scenic River.
- Mullica River and its tributaries from the Pine Barrens, New Jersey, where the dark water is called cedar water
- Gooseberry River: a river in northern Minnesota that leaches from peat bogs and pine forests
- Ocqueoc River, Michigan: a river in the northern Lower Peninsula that flows in Lake Huron
- Tahquamenon River, Michigan: a river in the Upper Peninsula that flows into Lake Superior
- Tuckahoe River, New Jersey: a short river in southern New Jersey that flows into Great Egg Harbor

=== Africa ===
- Most Congo and Lower Guinean rivers that flow through rainforests are blackwater.
- The Congo basin lakes Mai-Ndombe and Tumba are blackwater.
- The New Calabar and Sombreiro Rivers (both exiting in the Niger River Delta) are blackwater.

=== Australia ===
- Gordon River, Tasmania: a river rising in the center of the island and flowing westward, emptying into Macquarie Harbour on the West Coast
- Pieman River, Tasmania: a river on the West Coast which leaches from rainforests and heathlands
- Davey River, Tasmania: a relatively small river in the southwest corner of the island which runs through extensive heathlands, peat bogs and button grass plains
- Noosa River, Queensland: a small section of the Noosa River running between Lake Cootharaba and Lake Cooroibah
- Searys Creek, Queensland: a small river running from the Great Sandy National Park to Tin Can Bay stained with tea-tree tannin.

==== Intermittent blackwater events ====
Other rivers in Australia may experience infrequent 'blackwater events' associated with flood waters connecting to forested floodplains and these events may be associated with hypoxic waters [low oxygen]. Examples include the Murray River, Edward River, Wakool River and Murrumbidgee River.

=== Indonesia ===
- Sabangau River
- Kapuas River

== Gallery ==
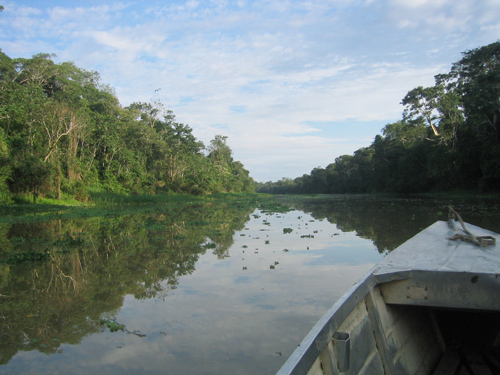
Amazon tributary classified as blackwater

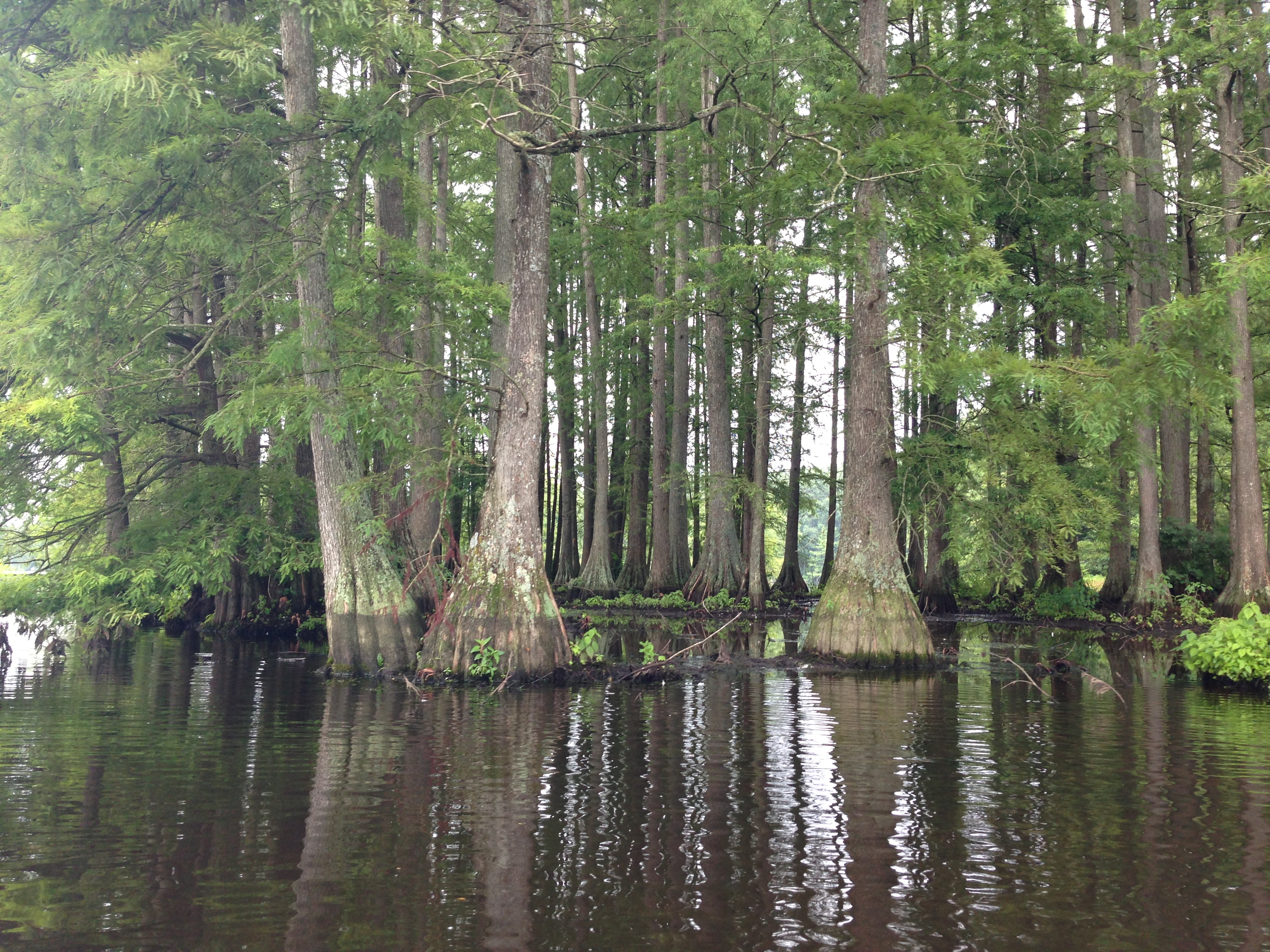
Cluster of bald cypress trees in Trap Pond State Park in Southern Delaware

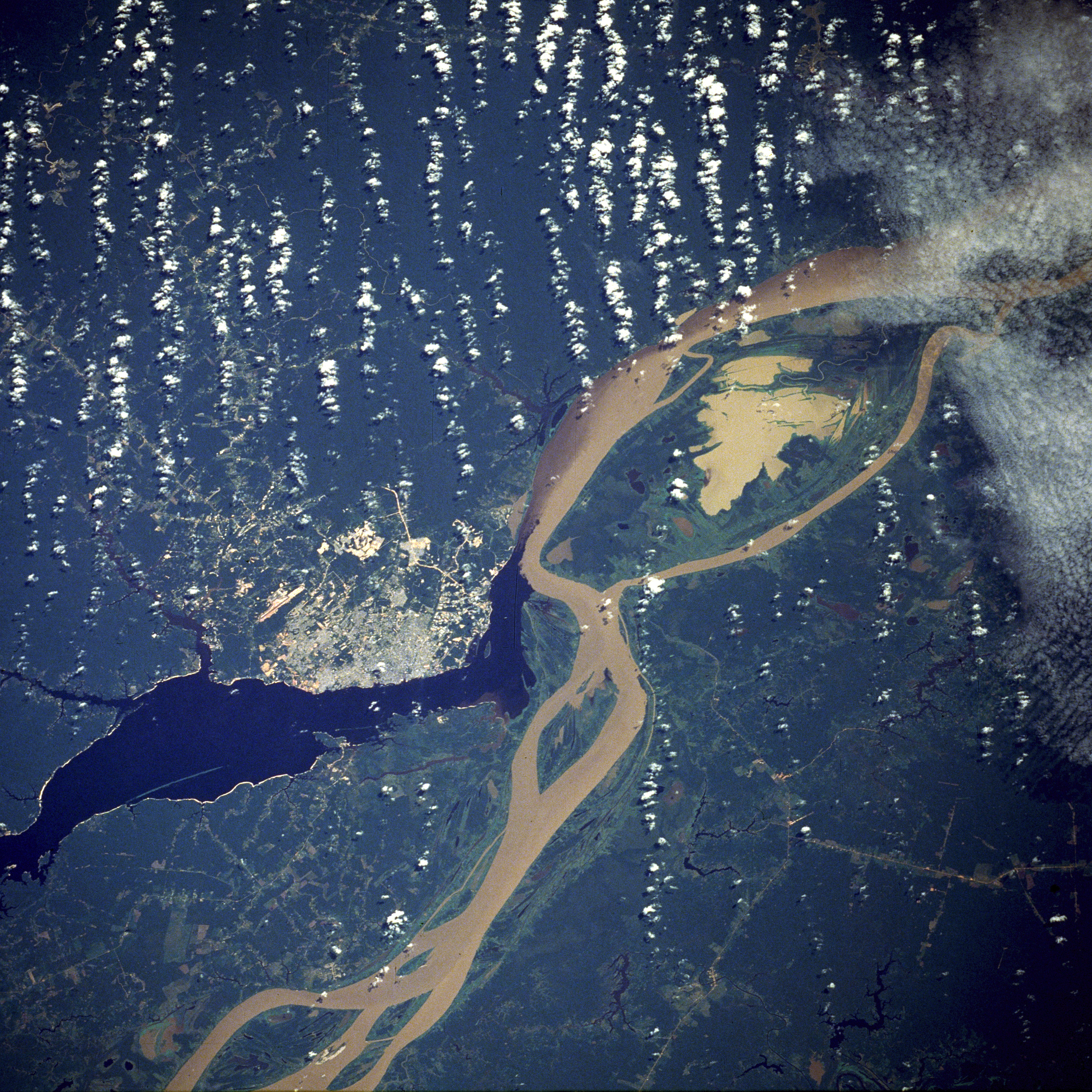
Manaus, the largest city on the Amazon River, from a NASA satellite image, surrounded by the muddy Amazon river and the blackwater Rio Negro

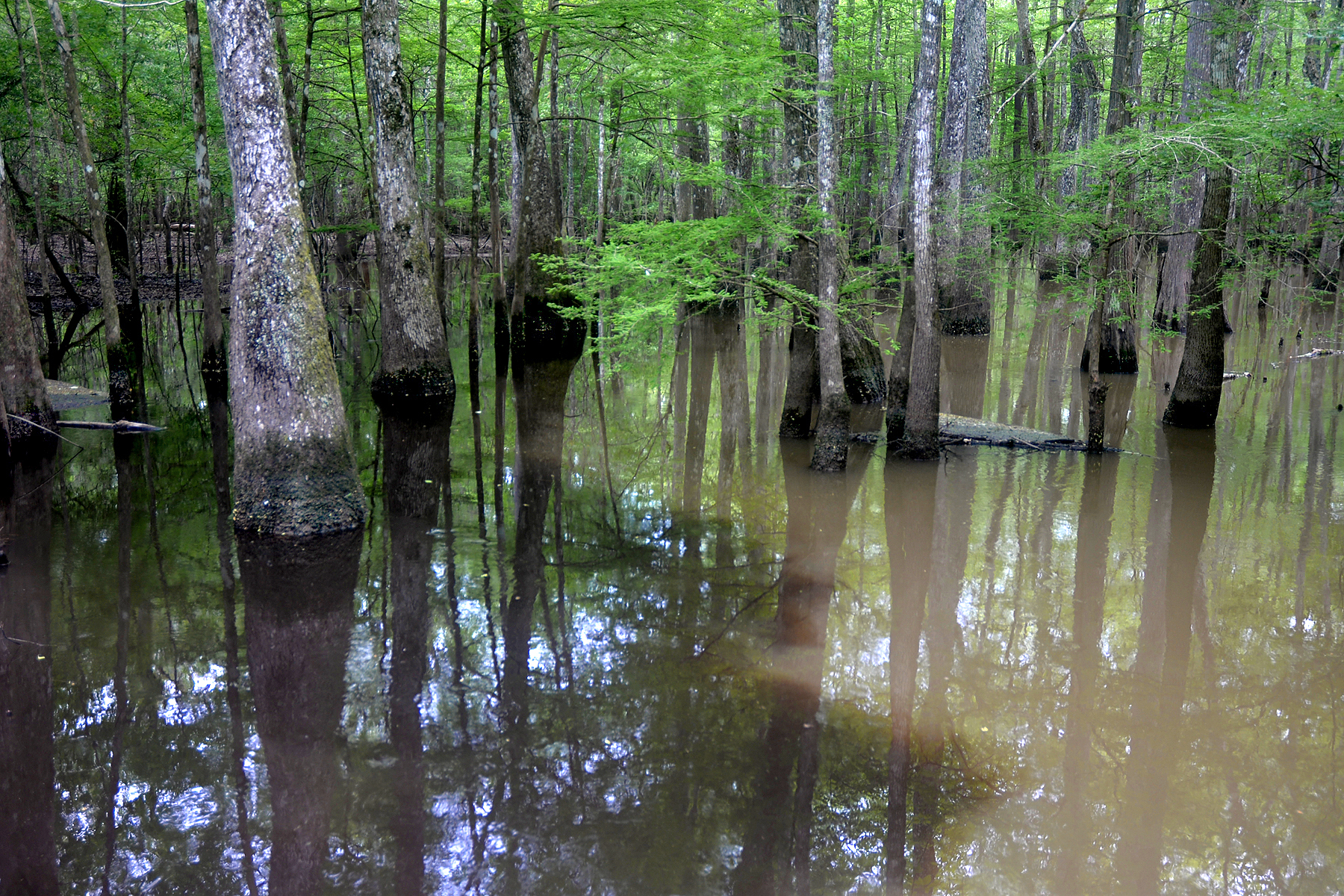
A cypress slough where baygall blackwater (left) mixes with the more typical muddy waters (right) of the region. Big Thicket National Preserve, Jack Gore Baygall Unit, Hardin Co. Texas; 3 April 2020

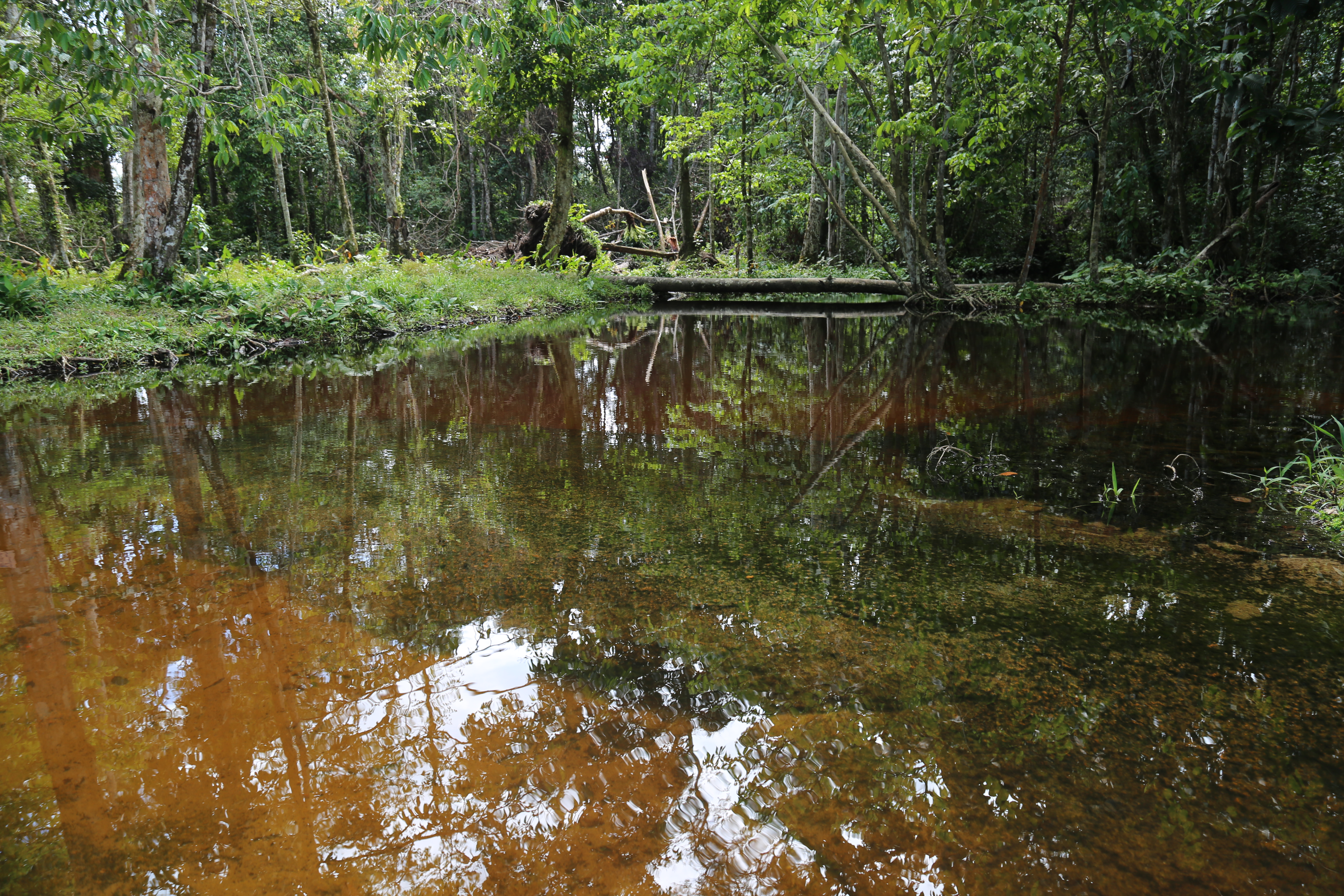
Caño Ceima Cachivera, Mitú, Vaupés: one of the most visited waterfalls and indigenous communities In Mitú, Colombia

== See also ==
- Bog
- Colored dissolved organic matter
