= Clearwater river (river type) =

River classification based on chemistry, sediments and water colour

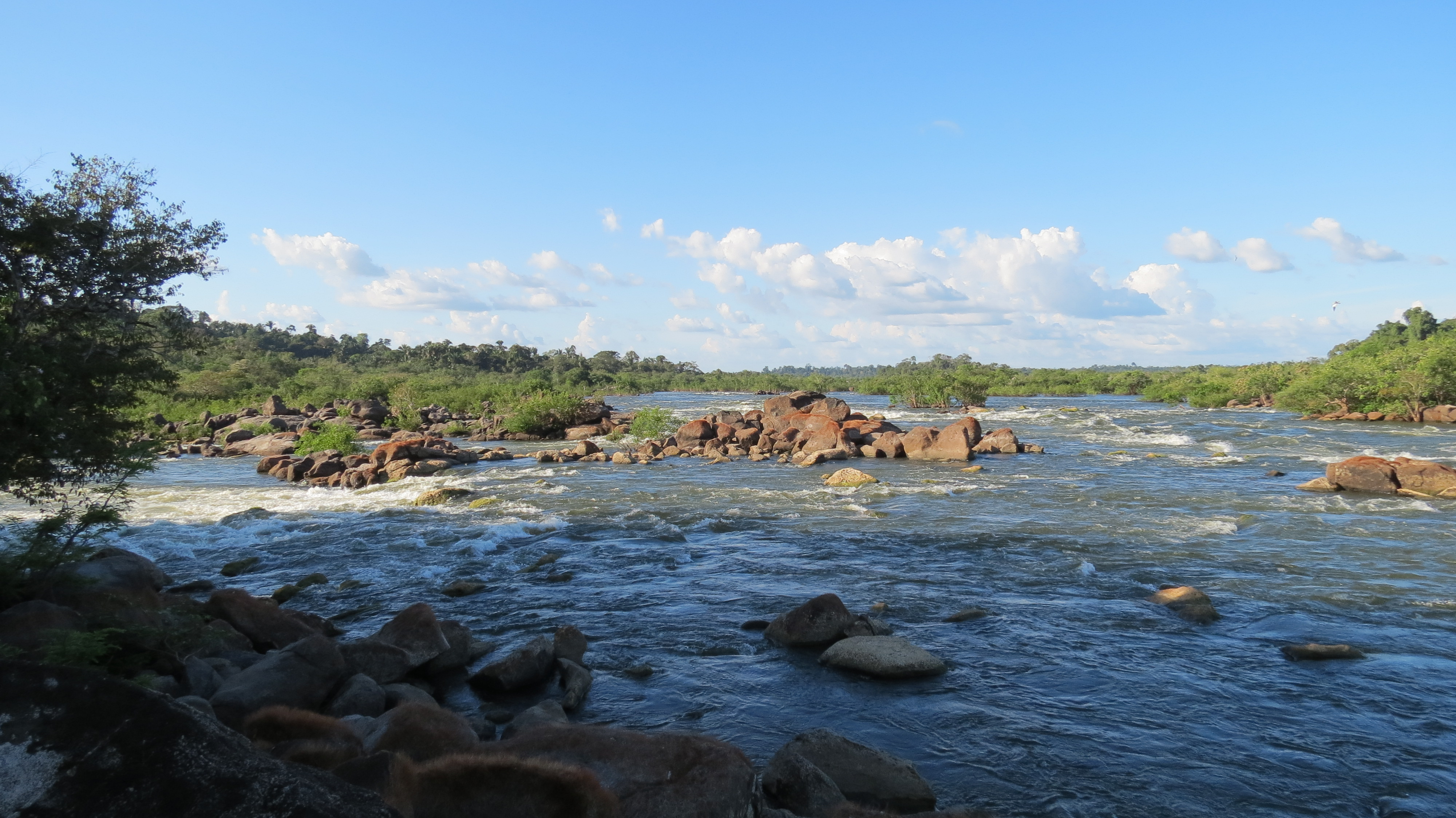
Like many clearwater rivers, the Xingu has sections with rapids that are home to many threatened rheophilic fish found nowhere else in the world

A clearwater river is classified based on its chemistry, sediments and water colour. Clearwater rivers have a low conductivity, relatively low levels of dissolved solids, typically have a neutral to slightly acidic pH and are very clear with a greenish colour. Clearwater rivers often have fast-flowing sections.

The main clearwater rivers are South American and have their source in the Brazilian Plateau or the Guiana Shield. Outside South America the classification is not commonly used, but rivers with clearwater characteristics are found elsewhere.

Amazonian rivers fall into three main categories: clearwater, blackwater and whitewater. This classification system was first proposed by Alfred Russel Wallace in 1853 based on water colour, but the types were more clearly defined according to chemistry and physics by Harald Sioli from the 1950s to the 1980s. Although many Amazonian rivers fall clearly into one of these categories, others show a mix of characteristics and may vary depending on season and flood levels.

== Location ==
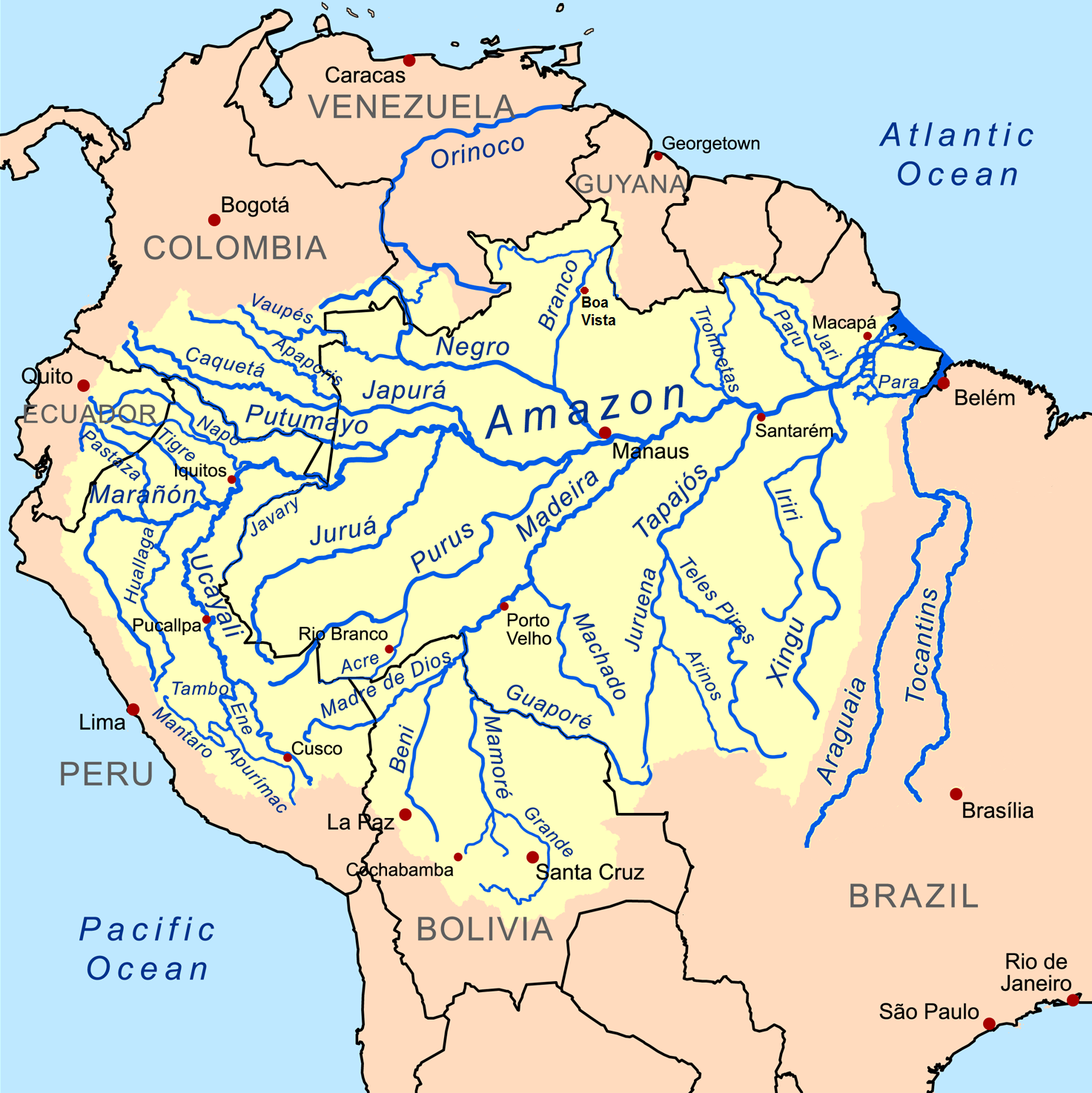
Map of the Amazon basin. Tributaries of the Amazon River in the eastern part of the basin are typically clearwater

The main clearwater rivers are South American and have their source in the Brazilian Plateau or the Guiana Shield. Examples of clearwater rivers originating in the Brazilian Plateau include Tapajós, Xingu, Tocantins, several large right-bank tributaries of the Madeira (notably Guaporé, Ji-Paraná and Aripuanã) and Paraguay (although heavily influenced by its whitewater tributaries). The Tapajós and Xingu alone account for 6% and 5%, respectively, of the water in the Amazon basin. Examples of clearwater rivers originating in the Guiana Shield include the upper Orinoco (above the inflow of the blackwater Atabapo and whitewater Inírida–Guaviare), Ventuari, Nhamundá, Trombetas, Paru, Araguari and Suriname.

Outside South America the classification is not commonly used, but rivers with clearwater characteristics are found elsewhere, such as the upper Zambezi River, certain upland streams in major river basins of South and Southeast Asia, and many streams of northern Australia.

== Chemistry and sediments ==
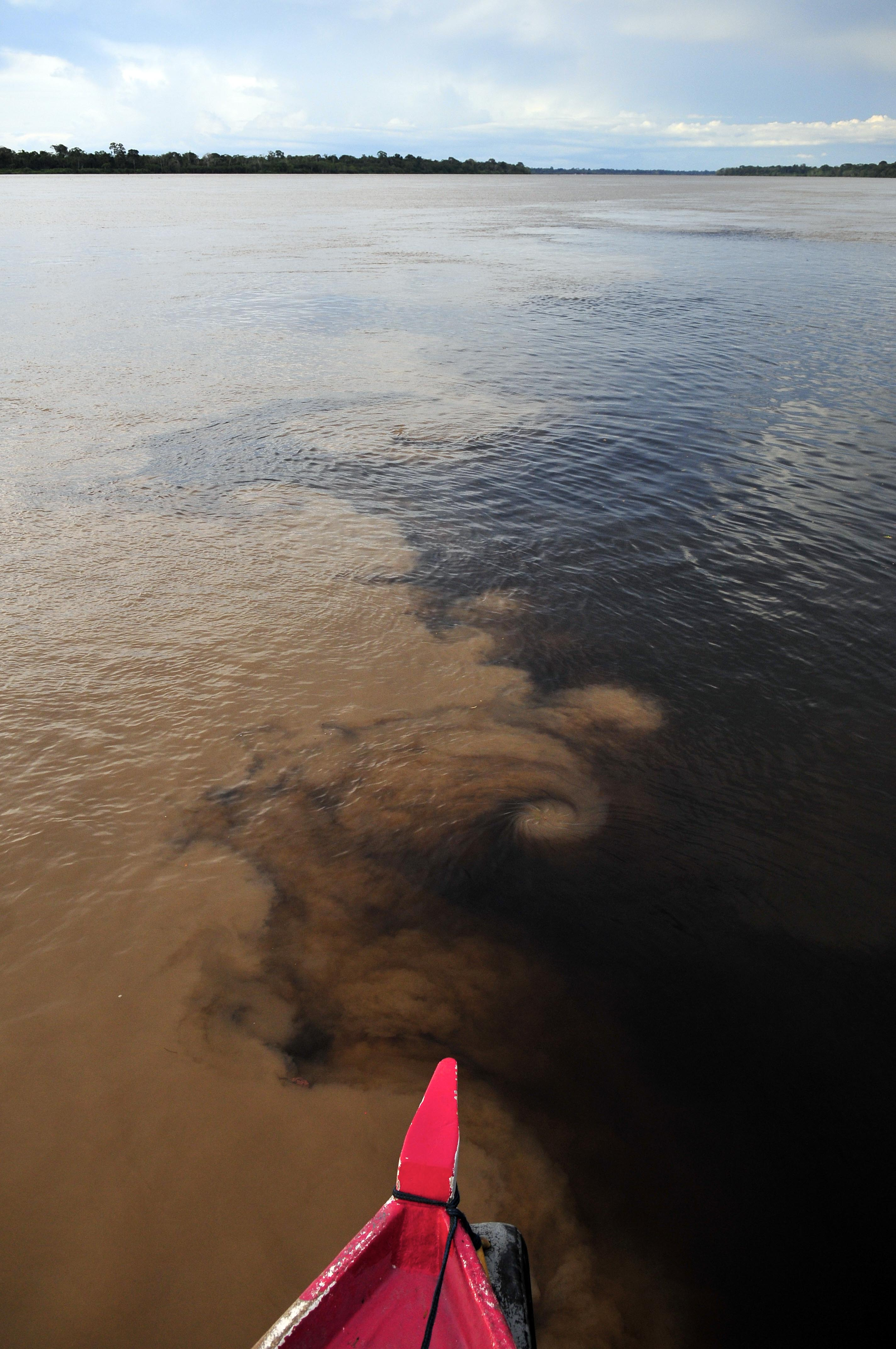
The confluence of the Madeira River and Aripuanã River (dark). Despite its colour on this photo, Aripuanã is clearwater, while the Madeira is whitewater

In South America, clearwater rivers typically have their source and flow through regions with sandy soils and crystalline rocks. These are generally ancient, of Precambrian origin, and therefore heavily weathered, allowing relatively few sediments to be dissolved in the water. This results in the low conductivity, relatively low levels of dissolved solids and clear colour typical of clearwater rivers.

Sand and kaolinite are the typical sediments transported by clearwater rivers, similar to blackwater, but unlike whitewater that also transports high levels of illite and montmorillonite, resulting in a significantly higher fertility of places influenced by the latter river type. Nevertheless, although clearwater rivers can have extremely low nutrient levels similar to blackwater, some such as the Tapajós, Xingu and Tocantins have nutrient levels that are intermediate between black and whitewater. The exact chemistry of clearwater rivers varies, but it is often very similar to rainwater, low in major nutrients with sodium as the relatively dominating chemical.

The water is typically neutral to slightly acidic, but the pH can range between 4.5 and 8. In the Amazon basin, clearwater rivers flowing through regions with sediments of Tertiary age are typically highly acidic, while those flowing through sediments of Carboniferous age are closer to neutral or slightly basic.

As suggested by the name, clearwater rivers are highly transparent with a typical visibility of 1.5–4 m (5–13 ft). There can be large variations, even within a single river, depending on season or heavy rains.

Average physico-chemical characteristics
	Juruá River (typical whitewater)	Tapajós River (typical clearwater)	Tefé River (typical blackwater)
pH	7.27	6.56	5.03
Electric conductivity (μS/cm)	191.14	14.33	7.36
Total suspended solids (mg/L)	51.42	10.56	7.90
Ca (mg/L)	32.55	0.52	0.71
Mg (mg/L)	4.42	0.26	0.22
Na (mg/L)	10.19	1.50	0.40
K (mg/L)	1.98	0.93	1.41
Total P (mg/L)	0.080	0.010	0.033
CO_{3} (mg/L)	106.14	8.80	6.86
NO_{3} (mg/L)	0.031	0.040	0.014
NH_{4} (mg/L)	0.062	0.19	0.13
Total N (mg/L)	0.39	0.35	0.24
SO_{4} (mg/L)	2.56	0.30	4.20
Colour (mg/Pt/L)	41.61	4.02	54.90
Si (mg/L)	5.78	5.25	0.33
Cl (mg/L)	4.75	0.53	0.85

== Ecology ==
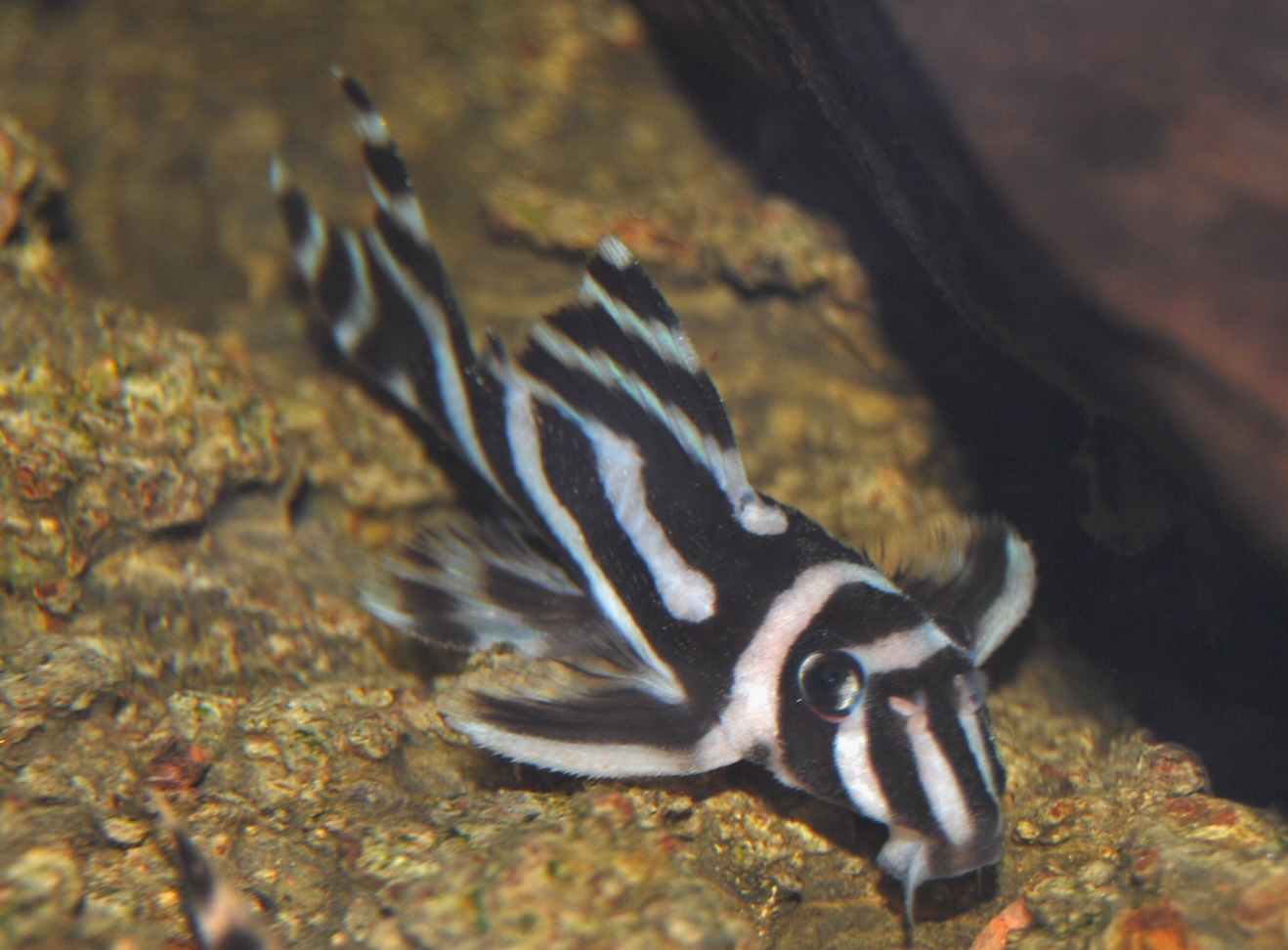
The zebra pleco is one of the many species, including several other catfish, that are restricted to clearwater rivers and threatened by dams

The difference in chemistry and visibility between the various black, white and clearwater rivers result in distinct differences in flora and fauna. Although there is considerable overlap in the fauna found in the different river types, there are also many species found only in one of them. Many blackwater and clearwater species are restricted to relatively small parts of the Amazon, as different blackwater and clearwater systems are separated (and therefore isolated) by large whitewater sections. These "barriers" are considered a main force in allopatric speciation in the Amazon basin.

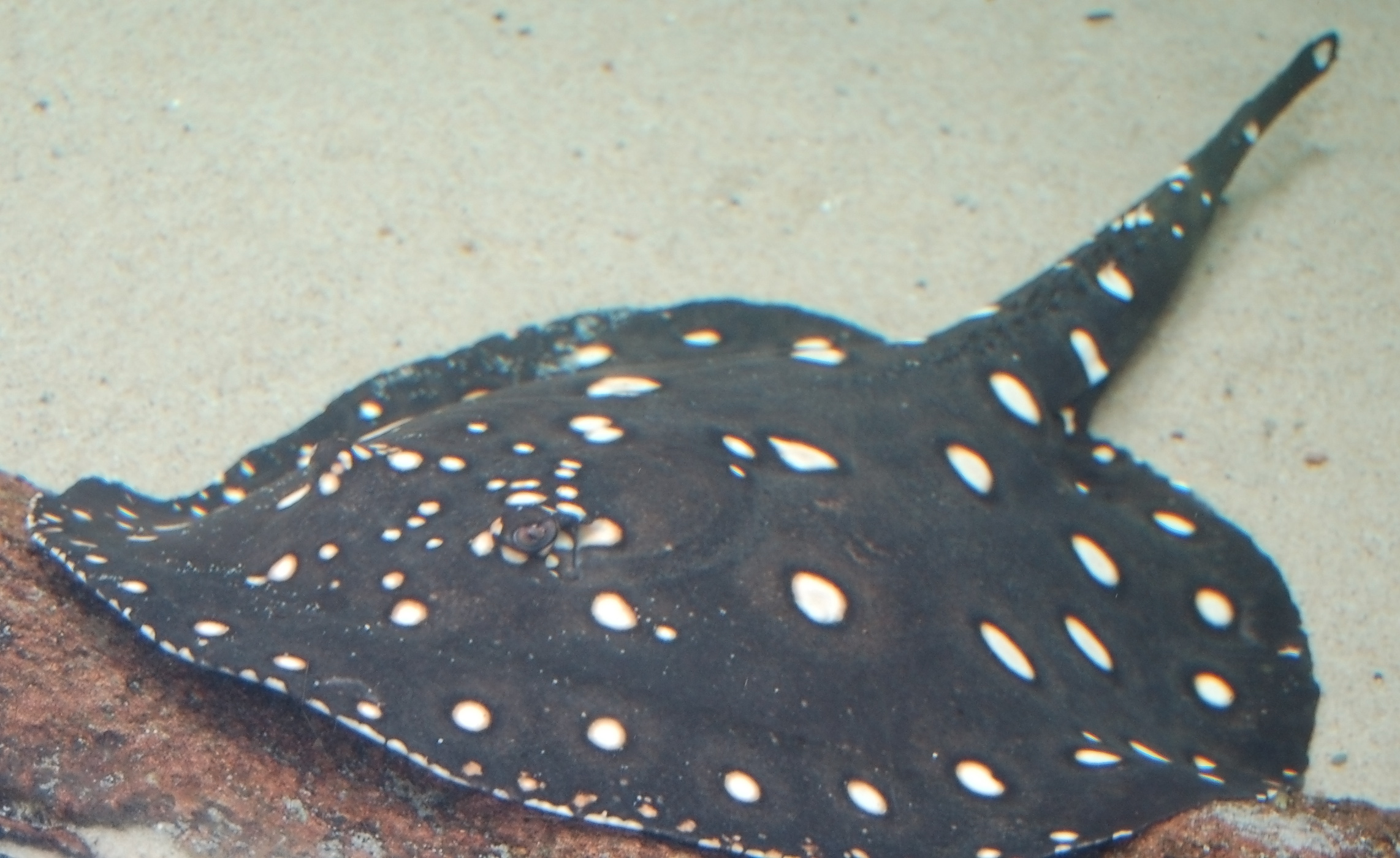
Potamotrygon leopoldi is part of a species complex of blackish river rays with contrasting pale spots from Brazilian clearwater rivers

Many species of fish, which often are threatened (especially by dams), are only known from clearwater rivers. Large sections with rapids are home to specialized, rheophilic fish, as well as aquatic plants such as Podostemaceae. There are major differences in the amount of macrophytes and this is mainly related to light: heavily shaded clearwater rivers have few, while those flowing through more open regions often contain many. Clearwater rivers have relatively low productivity compared to whitewater rivers, resulting in a comparably low insect abundance.
