= Hypancistrus furunculus =

Conservation status
- Least Concern (IUCN 3.1)

Scientific classification
- Kingdom: Animalia
- Phylum: Chordata
- Class: Actinopterygii
- Order: Siluriformes
- Family: Loricariidae
- Subfamily: Hypostominae
- Genus: Hypancistrus
- Species: H. furunculus

Binomial name
- Hypancistrus furunculus Armbruster, Lujan & Taphorn, 2007

Species of fish

Hypancistrus furunculus is a species of freshwater ray-finned fish belonging to the family Loricariidae, the suckermouth armoured catfishes, and the subfamily Hypostominae, the suckermouth catfishes. This catfish is found in Venezuela where it occurs in the Orinoco River's main channel, up to and including the Ventuari River, it is likely that this species also occurs in neighbouring areas of Colombia. The holotype has a standard length of 65.3 mm (2.57 in).
