= Hypancistrus contradens =

Conservation status
- Near Threatened (IUCN 3.1)

Scientific classification
- Kingdom: Animalia
- Phylum: Chordata
- Class: Actinopterygii
- Order: Siluriformes
- Family: Loricariidae
- Genus: Hypancistrus
- Species: H. contradens

Binomial name
- Hypancistrus contradens Armbruster, Lujan & Taphorn, 2007

Species of fish

Hypancistrus contradens is a species of freshwater ray-finned fish belonging to the family Loricariidae, the suckermouth armoured catfishes, and the subfamily Hypostominae, the suckermouth catfishes. This catfish is endemic to Venezuela where it occurs on the Guiana Shield in the Ventuari River drainage, part of the Upper Orinoco basin in the state of Amazonas. This species inhabits rivers, streams and creeks where there are rocky bottoms, typically within cracks in the bedrock subject to moderate currents, with a covering of periphyton and aufwuchs, as well as in floodplain ponds. The International Union for Conservation of Nature have assessed the conservation status of this fish as Near Threatened because it has a restricted distribution and its habitat is threatened by illegal mining and deforestation, although more data is needed. The holotype has a standard length of 84.9 mm (3.34 in).
