= Hypancistrus lunaorum =

Conservation status
- Least Concern (IUCN 3.1)

Scientific classification
- Kingdom: Animalia
- Phylum: Chordata
- Class: Actinopterygii
- Order: Siluriformes
- Family: Loricariidae
- Subfamily: Hypostominae
- Genus: Hypancistrus
- Species: H. lunaorum

Binomial name
- Hypancistrus lunaorum Armbruster, Lujan & Taphorn, 2007

Species of fish

Hypancistrus lunaorum is a species of freshwater ray-finned fish belonging to the family Loricariidae, the suckermouth armoured catfishes, and the subfamily Hypostominae, the suckermouth catfishes. This catfish is endemic to Venezuela where it occurs in the Orinoco River's main channel, upstream from and including the Ventuari River. The holotype has a standard length of 60.7 mm (2.39 in). This species is found in the aquarium trade where it is known as the Luna angel pleco or by the number L339.
