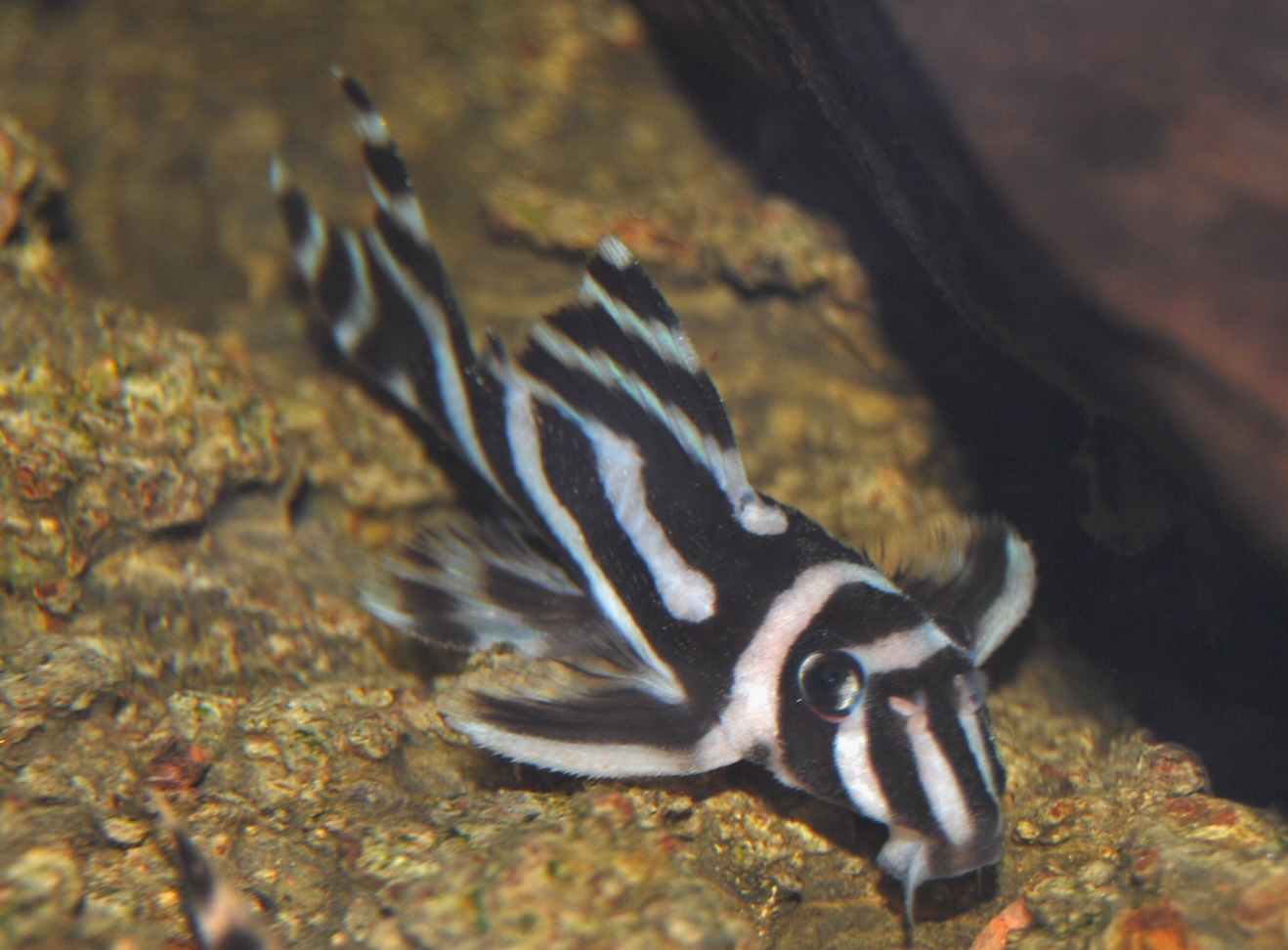
- Hypancistrus zebra

Scientific classification
- Kingdom: Animalia
- Phylum: Chordata
- Class: Actinopterygii
- Order: Siluriformes
- Family: Loricariidae
- Subfamily: Hypostominae
- Genus: Hypancistrus; Isbrücker & Nijssen, 1991

Type species
- Hypancistrus zebra Isbrücker & Nijssen, 1991

= Hypancistrus =

Genus of fishes

Hypancistrus is a genus of freshwater ray-finned fish belonging to the family Loricariidae, the suckermouth armoured catfishes, and the subfamily Hypostominae, the suckermouth catfishes. These catfishes are found in the Amazon basin in South America. Unlike many of the other loricariids, some Hypancistrus species have carnivorous tendencies and enjoy meat in their diet. Many Hypancistrus species are popular aquarium fish.

== Etymology ==
Hypancistrus is a combination of the Greek term "hypo", which means "somewhat" or "little", with Ancistrus, the type genus of the tribe Ancistrini, and is an allusion to H. zebra having fewer teeth than that genus.

== Taxonomy ==
Hypancistrus was first proposed as a monospecific genus in 1991 by the Dutch ichthyologists Isbrücker and Nijssen when they described H. zebra, then its only species. They gave the type locality of H. zebra as "About 1 hr. upstream of Altamira by speedboat, anastomoses of Rio Xingu, Pará State, Brazil". H. inspector was the next species to be described in 2002, followed by four more species described in 2007. There are currently about a dozen described species in this genus, and there are many more undescribed ones, some designated with L-numbers. It was believed that this genus was not monophyletic, though this has since changed. Some authorities regard this genus as being within the tribe Ancistrini of the subfamily Hypostominae, but Eschmeyer's Catalog of Fishes does not recognise tribes within the subfamily Hypostominae.

== Species ==
Hypancistrus contains the following species:

- Hypancistrus contradens Armbruster, Lujan & Taphorn, 2007
- Hypancistrus debilittera Armbruster, Lujan & Taphorn, 2007
- Hypancistrus furunculus Armbruster, Lujan & Taphorn, 2007
- Hypancistrus inspector Armbruster, 2002
- Hypancistrus lunaorum Armbruster, Lujan & Taphorn, 2007
- Hypancistrus margaritatus Tan & Armbruster, 2016
- Hypancistrus phantasma Tan & Armbruster, 2016
- Hypancistrus seideli Sousa, Sousa, Oliveira, Sabaj Pérez, Zuanon & Rapp Py-Daniel, 2025
- Hypancistrus vandragti (Lujan & Armbruster, 2011)
- Hypancistrus yudja Sousa, Sousa, Oliveira, Sabaj Pérez, Zuanon & Rapp Py-Daniel, 2025
- Hypancistrus zebra Isbrücker & Nijssen, 1991

== Distribution and habitat ==
Hypancistrus species are known from the Xingu River, the Orinoco River and the Rio Negro. Venezuela appears to be a hotspot; the four species described in 2007, for instance, originate from the northern Orinoco in southern Venezuela, near or in the Ventuari River. New species await to be described from regions such as Brazil and Guyana.

These fish are found in water with slow to moderate flowing speeds. They inhabit the bedrock and crevices within bedrock.

== Anatomy and appearance ==
Hypancistrus species, like other loricariids, are armored (in scutes; scales are absent as with catfishes in general) and have a suckermouth, allowing them to attach to submerged objects. These fish have strong pectoral and dorsal fin spines, and the eye is specially developed, with an omega iris. The body is dorsoventrally flattened.

Hypancistrus species can be differentiated from other genera of loricariids by a number of characteristics. For instance, these fish have highly angled jaws that form an angle of less than 90 degrees, which is a trait shared only by a few other genera. Also, their scutes are not highly ridged or keeled like that of some genera, and their abdomen is only half-plated with armor as opposed to full-plated. Hypancistrus species have fewer dentary teeth than premaxillary teeth, and the former are almost twice as long as the latter. Breeding males have larger odontodes on the pectoral fin spines and on the cheek, though in some species, breeding males also have hypertrophied odontodes on the lateral plates (like Peckoltia species). Synapomorphies of this genus include differences in the jaw structure from other loricariids.

Hypancistrus species do not get very large, with no species exceeding about 11 centimetres (4 in). They tend to be attractively marked, with dark brown to black and white spots, stripes, or squiggles. The exact pattern allows one to distinguish them from each other; concretely:

- H. zebra is distinguishable as a white fish with oblique, black stripes that extend from behind the head into the tail, with an obvious E turned sideways on its nose.
- H. furunculus appears rather similar to H. zebra, but it has a creamier color (rather than white) and it only has one oblique stripe rather than many.
- H. furunculus and H. debilittera both have vertical stripes on the caudal fin. However, H. debilittera has a dark base color and white spots, bands, and vermiculations with an either weakly formed or absent E on the nose.
- In H. inspector, there are smaller spots on the head and larger spots on the body, and some of the spots on the upper caudal fin will join and form bands.
- If the dorsal fin of H. inspector is pushed down, the dorsal fin does not reach the adipose fin, in contrast to H. contradens and H. lunaorum.
- H. lunaorum has very small, gold spots dotting its body and, if present, the spots on the head will be of the same size.
- H. contradens has white or pink, similarly sized spots large that do not connect to form bands.
- H. margaritatus is distinguished from all congeners by its color pattern of dense, small, light-colored spots on a dark base color.
- H. phantasma can be distinguished from congeners by a color pattern consisting of a tan base coloration with black spots.

== Diet ==
Hypancistrus species are unusual in that some species (such as H. zebra) accept meatier foods than many of their relatives, and are generally omnivorous. Some other members of the genus tend to eat more plant material; H. inspector is known to eat algae, detritus, and also seeds. H. contradens is noted to probably feed on aufwuchs; their guts have been shown to contain filamentous algae as well as various organic and inorganic matter.

== In the aquarium ==
Many Hypancistrus species are popular aquarium fish due to their small size and attractive coloration. Because of their more carnivorous diet, these fish are not like the algae eaters aquarists are used to. These fish should be provided with clean, fast-moving water. They can be maintained in community aquariums, but quieter cohabitants are preferred so that these fish are not scared into hiding. Members of this genus have been captive bred by hobbyists.

Below is a list of the described Hypancistrus with their L-numbers, as well as some undescribed types with common names that appear in the aquarium trade. There are many Hypancistrus only designated by their L-number that are not included. H. phantasma is not designated by L-numbers because this species is only known from holotype and paratypes caught on 14 February 1924 from Taracuá, Río Uaupés a tributary of the Río Negro drainage.

L-number(s)	Common name(s)	Scientific name
L004, L005, L028, L073	Angelicus pleco	
L046, L098, L137	Zebra pleco, Imperial pleco	H. zebra
L066 / L333	King tiger pleco, Scribbled pleco, Network pleco	
L102	Snow-ball pleco	H. inspector
L129		H. debilittera
L199		H. furunculus
L201		H. contradens
L260	Queen Arabesque pleco	
L262	Spotted Queen Arabesque, Salt Queen	
L270, L307	Chocolate zebra pleco, Tapajos zebra pleco	
L339		H. lunaorum
L404		H. margaritatus
