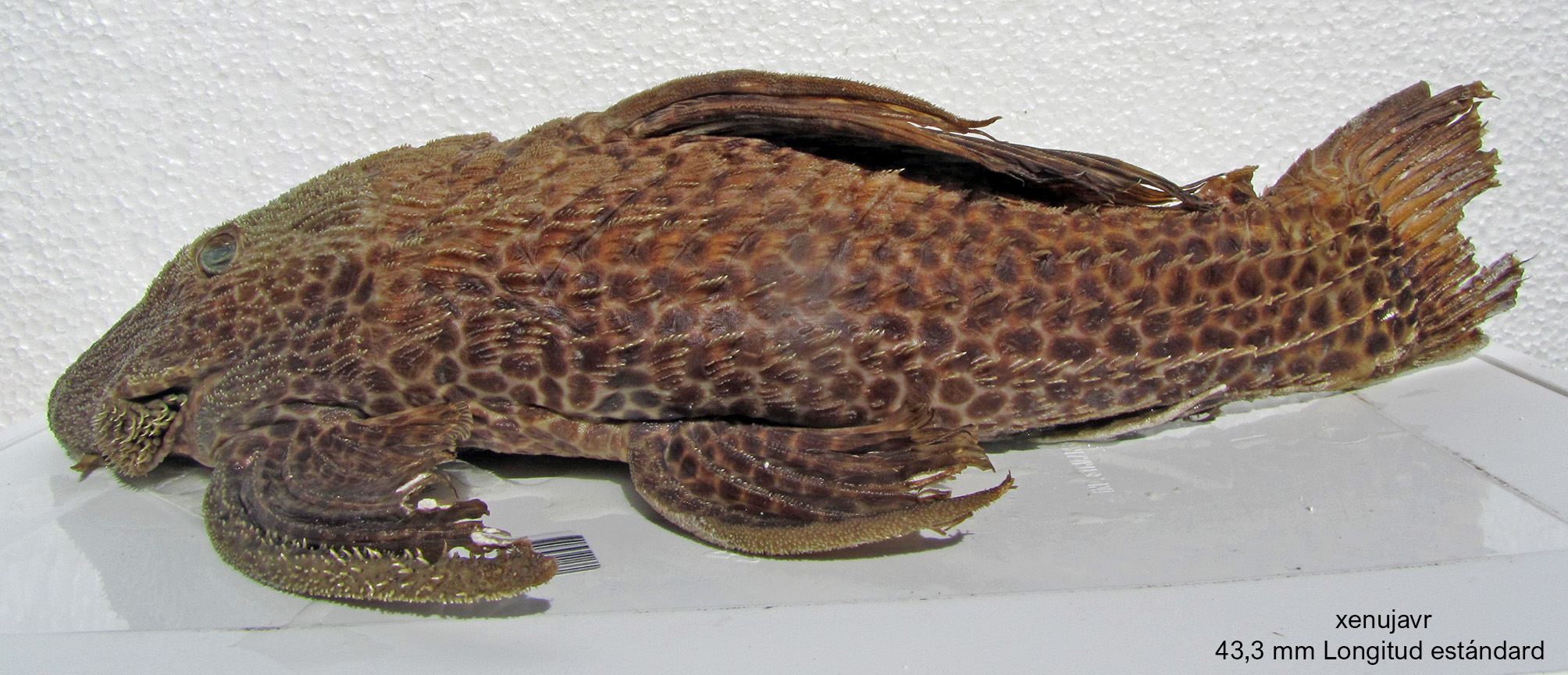

Conservation status
- Least Concern (IUCN 3.1)

Scientific classification
- Kingdom: Animalia
- Phylum: Chordata
- Class: Actinopterygii
- Order: Siluriformes
- Family: Loricariidae
- Subfamily: Hypostominae
- Genus: Megalancistrus
- Species: M. parananus

Binomial name
- Megalancistrus parananus (W. K. H. Peters, 1881)

Synonyms
- Pterygoplichthys (Ancistrus) parananus W. K. H. Peters, 1881; Pterygoplichthys parananus W. K. H. Peters, 1881; Chaetostomus aculeatus Perugia, 1891; Megalancistrus aculeatus (Perugia, 1891); Chaetostomas gigas Boulenger, 1895; Megalancistrus gigas (Boulenger, 1895)

= Megalancistrus parananus =

Species of fish

Megalancistrus parananus is a species of freshwater ray-finned fish belonging to the family Loricariidae, the suckermouth armoured catfishes, and the subfamily Hypostominae, the suckermouth catfishes. This catfish is found in South America where it occurs in the drainages of the Paraguay, Paraná and Uruguay in Argentina, Brazil, Paraguay and Uruguay. This species reaches a standard length of 58.8 cm (23.1 in). M. parananus was first formally described as Pterygoplichthys (Ancistrus) parananus in 1881 ny the German naturalist and explorer Wilhelm Peters with its type locality given as the Paraná River at La Paz, Entre Rios in Argentina. In 1895 George Albert Boulenger described Chaetostomas gigas from Paraguay and in 1980 Isaäc J. H. Isbrücker proposed the new genus Megalancistrus, designating C. gigas as its type species. In 2001 Isbrücker reclassified C. gigas as a synonym of Megalancistrus parananus.
