= Megalancistrus barrae =

Conservation status
- Least Concern (IUCN 3.1)

Scientific classification
- Kingdom: Animalia
- Phylum: Chordata
- Class: Actinopterygii
- Order: Siluriformes
- Family: Loricariidae
- Subfamily: Hypostominae
- Genus: Megalancistrus
- Species: M. barrae

Binomial name
- Megalancistrus barrae (Steindachner, 1910)

Synonyms
- Ancistrus barrae Steindachner, 1910

Species of fish

Megalancistrus barrae is a species of freshwater ray-finned fish belonging to the family Loricariidae, the suckermouth armoured catfishes, and the subfamily Hypostominae, the suckermouth catfishes. This catfish is endemic to Brazil where it is found in the São Francisco River basin in the states of Bahia and Sergipe. This species reaches a standard length of 41.8 cm (16.5 in) and a maximum weight of 2.2 kg (4.9 lb).
