= Hypancistrus debilittera =

Conservation status
- Least Concern (IUCN 3.1)

Scientific classification
- Kingdom: Animalia
- Phylum: Chordata
- Class: Actinopterygii
- Order: Siluriformes
- Family: Loricariidae
- Genus: Hypancistrus
- Species: H. debilittera

Binomial name
- Hypancistrus debilittera Armbruster, Lujan & Taphorn, 2007

Species of Armored Catfish

Hypancistrus debilittera is a species of freshwater ray-finned fish belonging to the family Loricariidae, the suckermouth armoured catfishes, and the subfamily Hypostominae, the suckermouth catfishes. This catfish is found in Venezuela and Colombia where it occurs in the upper Orinoco River from the Cinaruco River drainage south to the vicinity of the location where the Orinoco starts to flow northwards. The holotype has a standard length of 67 mm (2.6 in).
