= Leptoancistrus cordobensis =

Scientific classification
- Kingdom: Animalia
- Phylum: Chordata
- Class: Actinopterygii
- Order: Siluriformes
- Family: Loricariidae
- Genus: Leptoancistrus
- Species: L. cordobensis

Binomial name
- Leptoancistrus cordobensis Dahl, 1964

Species of catfish

Leptoancistrus cordobensis is a species of catfish in the family Loricariidae. It is native to South America, where it occurs in the upper Sinú River basin as well as the upper San Jorge River basin in the Magdalena River drainage in Colombia. The species reaches 3.7 cm (1.5 inches) in standard length.

Key diagnostic traits of the Leptoancistrus genus include the presence of notably elongated cheek odontodes and the complete absence of both adipose and anal fins.
