= Whitewater river (river type) =

Category for certain types of rivers

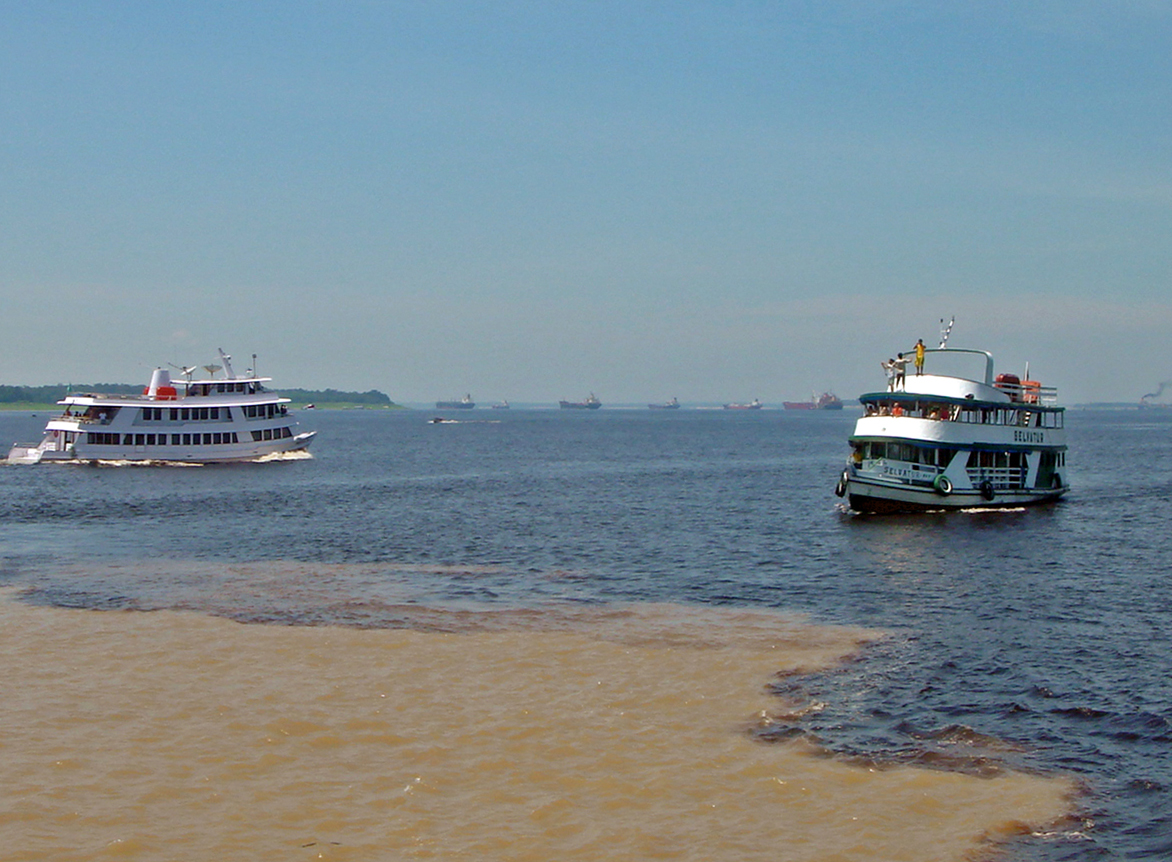
The Meeting of Waters where the pale brownish (whitewater) Amazon River mixes with the dark (blackwater) Rio Negro

A whitewater river is classified based on its chemistry, sediments and water colour. Whitewater rivers have high levels of suspended sediments, giving the water a pH that is near-neutral, a high electric conductivity and a pale muddy, café au lait-like colour. Whitewater rivers are of great ecological importance and are important to local fisheries. The major seasonal Amazonian floodplains known as várzea receive their water from them.

The best-known whitewater rivers are Amazonian and have their source in the Andes, but there are also whitewater rivers elsewhere in South America and in other continents.

Amazonian rivers fall into three main categories: whitewater, blackwater and clearwater. This classification system was first proposed by Alfred Russel Wallace in 1853 based on water colour, but the types were more clearly defined according to chemistry and physics by Harald Sioli from the 1950s to the 1980s. Although many Amazonian rivers fall clearly into one of these categories, others show a mix of characteristics and may vary depending on season and flood levels.

== Location ==
=== In South America ===
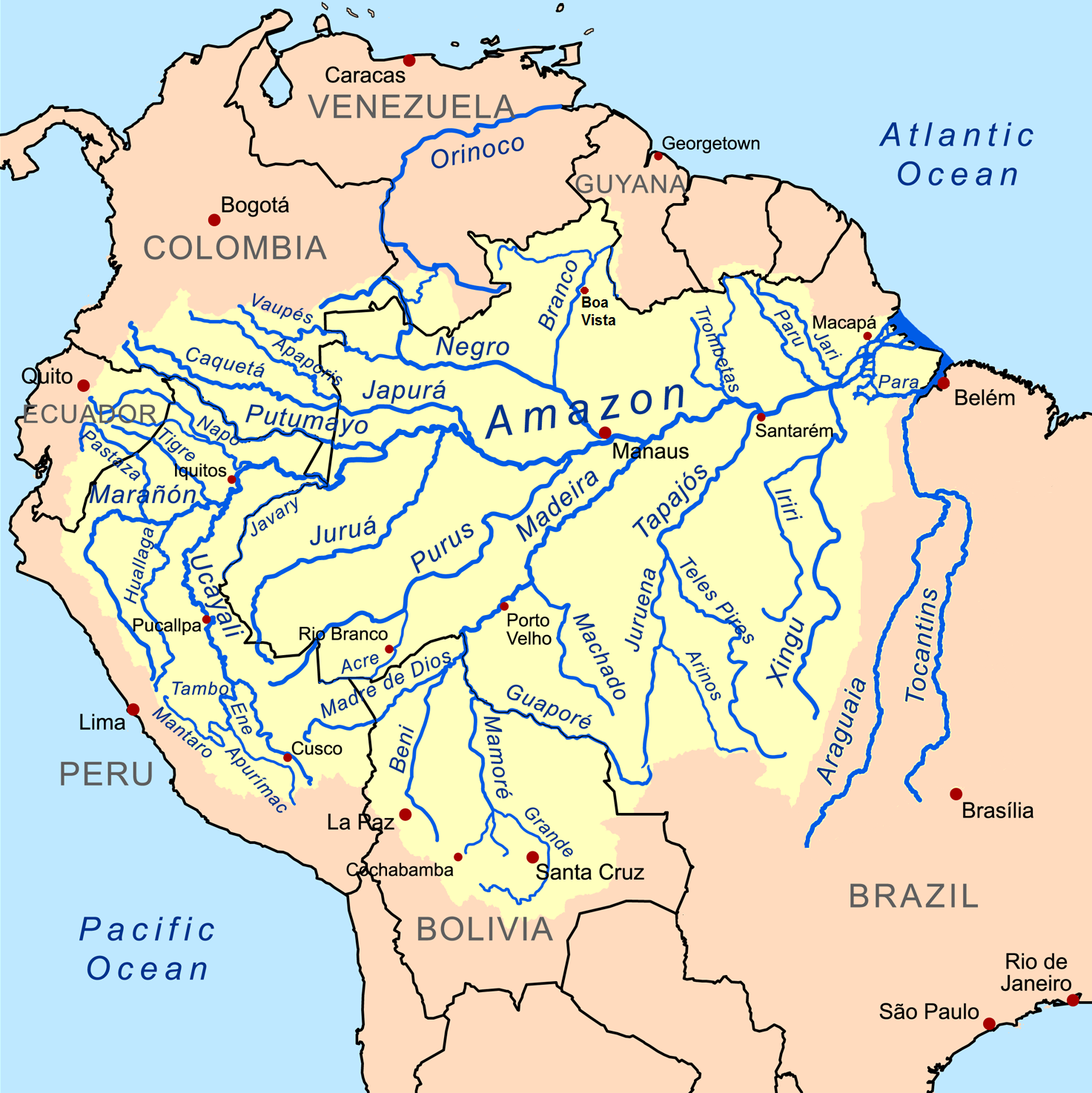
Map of the Amazon basin. Rivers that originate in the Andes (far west and southwest in basin) are typically whitewater.

The best-known whitewater rivers are Amazonian and have their source in the Andes. The main whitewater rivers are Solimões–Amazon, Caquetá–Japurá, Putumayo, Marañón, Ucayali, Javary, Juruá, Acre, Purus, Madre de Dios, and Madeira. Although the Branco River traditionally is considered whitewater, it has a number of characteristics (some of them varying with season) that do not fit clearly into the classification and some refer to it as clearwater.

Outside the Amazon, a small number of South American rivers are considered whitewater, most notably certain tributaries of the Orinoco such as the Guaviare, Meta and Apure Rivers, and of the Paraná—Paraguay such as the Bermejo and Salado Rivers, which have their source in the Andes.

=== In other continents ===
Outside South America, this system of classification is not widely used, but there are several rivers with mainly whitewater characteristics. In Africa, these include the Niger main stem and its floodplain, Orashi, the Nile (notably the Blue Nile), the middle and lower Zambezi, and the Cross, Mungo, Sanaga, and Wouri rivers. In Asia, examples are the Mekong mainstream (especially in the rainy season), and several upland streams in large river basins in the southern and southeastern part of the continent. In Europe, sections of the Danube have whitewater characteristics.

== Chemistry and sediments ==
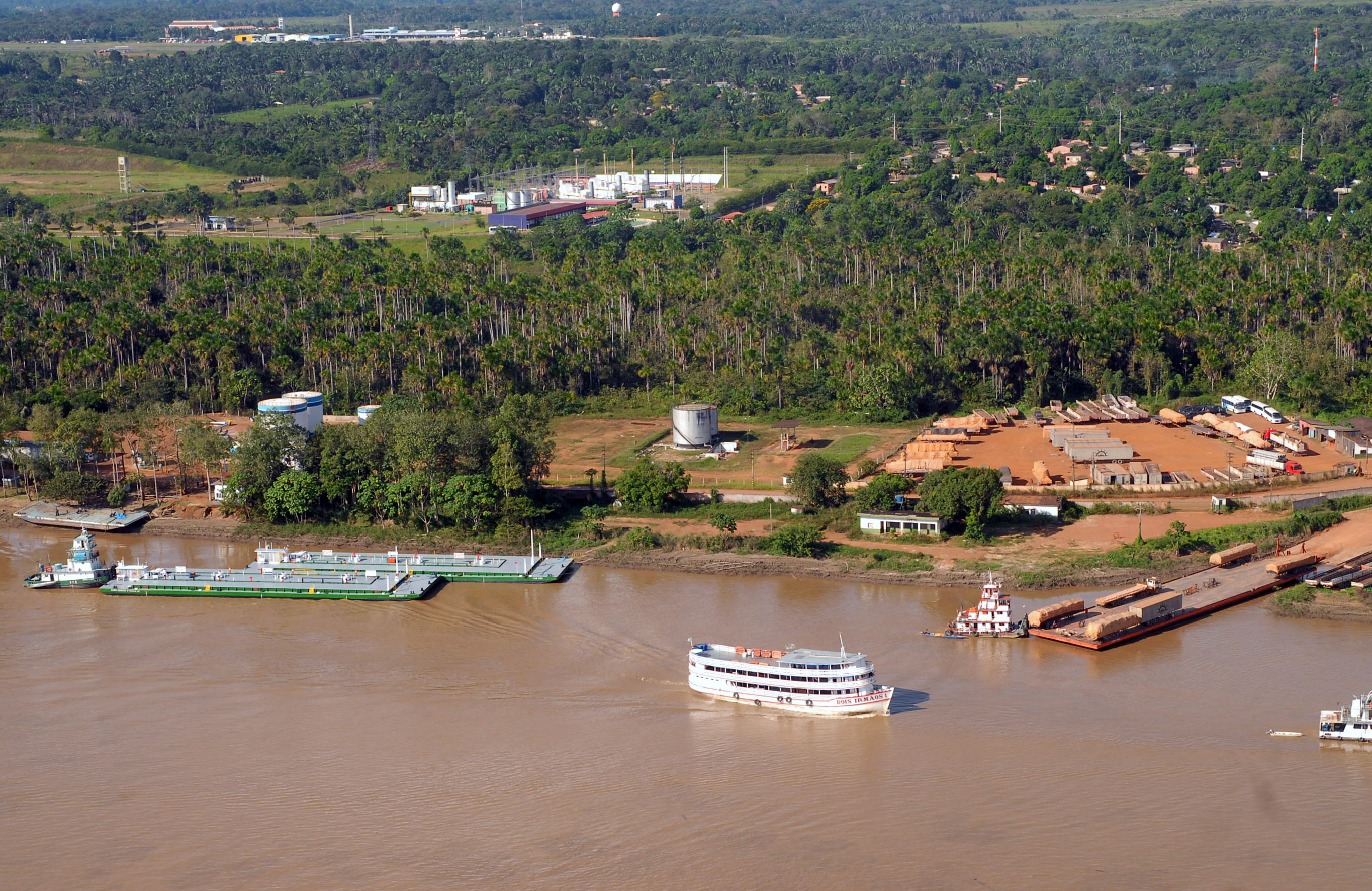
The Madeira showing the typical pale muddy colour of a whitewater river as it flows past Porto Velho, Brazil

In South America, most whitewater rivers originate in the Andes where they collect high levels of nutrient-rich sediments, notably illite and montmorillonite. They have a near-neutral pH (typically 6.5–7), high levels of dissolved solids (especially alkali earth metals and carbonate), and high electric conductivity. The water is turbid, with a low visibility that is usually between 20 and 60 cm (0.7–2.0 ft). In the main stem of the Amazon River, about 82% of the total suspended solids and 90–95% of the suspended load of sediments originate from the Andes. Along their course, whitewater rivers often become diluted due to the inflow of black- and clearwater tributaries. For example, the Rio Negro, the largest blackwater tributary, accounts for 14% of the total Amazon basin water and Tapajós, the largest clearwater tributary, accounts for 6%. Consequently, although the Amazon River is whitewater throughout its course, the electric conductivity is 120–200 μS/cm in the Andes, but by the time it reaches Santarém (after the inflow of Rio Negro, Tapajós, and some smaller black- and clearwater tributaries), it has fallen to 40-70 μS/cm. At high elevations in the Andes near the headwater, the pH of whitewater rivers can be above 8.

In some parts of the Amazon where the rivers are not naturally whitewater, "pseudo-whitewater" exists because of soil erosion from human activities.

Average physico-chemical characteristics
	Juruá River (typical whitewater)	Tapajós River (typical clearwater)	Tefé River (typical blackwater)
pH	7.27	6.56	5.03
Electric conductivity (μS/cm)	191.14	14.33	7.36
Total suspended solids (mg/L)	51.42	10.56	7.90
Ca (mg/L)	32.55	0.52	0.71
Mg (mg/L)	4.42	0.26	0.22
Na (mg/L)	10.19	1.50	0.40
K (mg/L)	1.98	0.93	1.41
Total P (mg/L)	0.080	0.010	0.033
CO_{3} (mg/L)	106.14	8.80	6.86
NO_{3} (mg/L)	0.031	0.040	0.014
NH_{4} (mg/L)	0.062	0.19	0.13
Total N (mg/L)	0.39	0.35	0.24
SO_{4} (mg/L)	2.56	0.30	4.20
Colour (mg/Pt/L)	41.61	4.02	54.90
Si (mg/L)	5.78	5.25	0.33
Cl (mg/L)	4.75	0.53	0.85

== Ecology ==
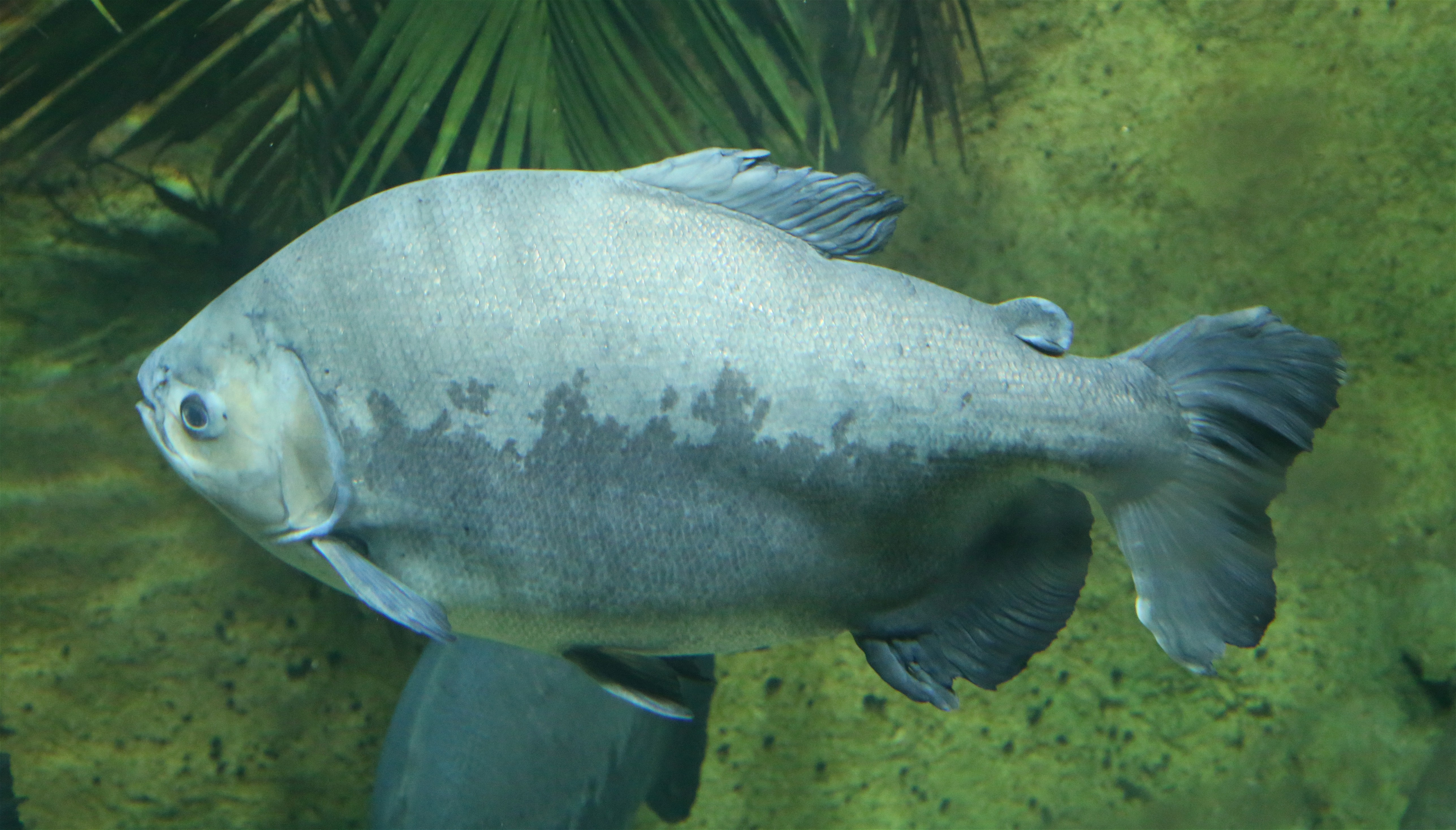
The tambaqui, an important species in Amazonian fisheries, relies on whitewater to breed

The difference in chemistry and visibility between the various black, white and clearwater rivers results in distinct differences in flora and fauna. Although there is considerable overlap in the fauna found in the different river types, there are also many species found only in one of them. Many blackwater and clearwater species are restricted to relatively small parts of the Amazon, as different blackwater and clearwater systems are separated (and therefore isolated) by large whitewater sections. These "barriers" are considered a main force in allopatric speciation in the Amazon basin.

As in South America, distinct differences between species in black- and whitewater can be seen in Asia and Africa. For example, the fish fauna in African whitewater rivers tend to be dominated by cyprinids, catfish, and elephantfish, whereas blackwater rivers usually have more characiforms and cichlids.

The high nutrient levels in whitewater rivers allow high levels of periphyton (in contrast to the nutrient-poor blackwater rivers), but the water turbidity restricts light, thereby limiting photosynthetic processes, which are necessary to algae and submerged macrophytes, to the uppermost part of the water column. The periphyton roughly equals the production level in temperate eutrophic lakes. Bacterial abundance and production rates are roughly equal in whitewater and blackwater rivers, but both vary with water level and productions are higher during the high-water season.

The major seasonal Amazonian floodplains known as várzea receive their water from whitewater rivers and are home to many animals and plants. In the Brazilian Amazon, várzea covers roughly 200,000 km^{2} (77,000 mi^{2}), equalling 4% of the entire area (twice the area covered by igapó). In addition to forests and woodlands with trees and other plants that are seasonally covered by water, about one-third of this floodplain's area is covered by large floating meadows. These floating meadows are home to the richest Amazonian community of aquatic invertebrates and important to fish, especially species that visit during the flood season for feeding or breeding (a lower number of fish species live in the habitat year-round). The floodplains are also very important for fisheries. For example, in the Brazilian Amazon, 61% of the yields from subsistence and local market fisheries is from districts with várzea. Several of the most important species in Amazonian fisheries rely on whitewater for breeding: The tambaqui (Colossoma macropomum), black prochilodus (Prochilodus nigricans) and Semaprochilodus spp. move into whitewater rivers to spawn, and many large catfish species (especially pimelodids such as Brachyplatystoma) perform long migrations up whitewater rivers to spawn. Most of the large cities in the Amazon region, such as Iquitos, Manaus, Santarém and Belém, are located on clear- or blackwater rivers (which have fewer insects), but at the junction of whitewater rivers (which have better fishing). Due to the high level of prey fish, the largest group-size of Inia river dolphins are in sections of the Amazon and Orinoco basins that are directly influenced by whitewater.

Planktonic organisms collected in Amazonian rivers
Animal groups present	Blackwater	Mixed water	Whitewater
Rotifera	284	23	0
Cladocera	5	29	43
Ostracoda	39	97	29
Calanoida	11	51	66
Cyclopoida	22	49	61
Chironomidae	0	3	3
Acari (mites)	0	0	2

Number of planktonic organisms collected in 10 L (2.6 US gal) of waters in Amazonian rivers
	Blackwater		Mixed water		Whitewater	
Animal groups present	Open water	Forest	Open water	Forest	Open water	Forest
Volvocaceae	42		38			
Rotifera	87	5	34			
Cladocera	6		5		8	1
Ostracoda	2	11	3		7	
Calanoida	23	3	10			
Cyclopoida	5	27	19	1	13	1
Mysidacea		1				
Diptera					1	
Acari (mites)			1		1	
Larval fish			1		1	
