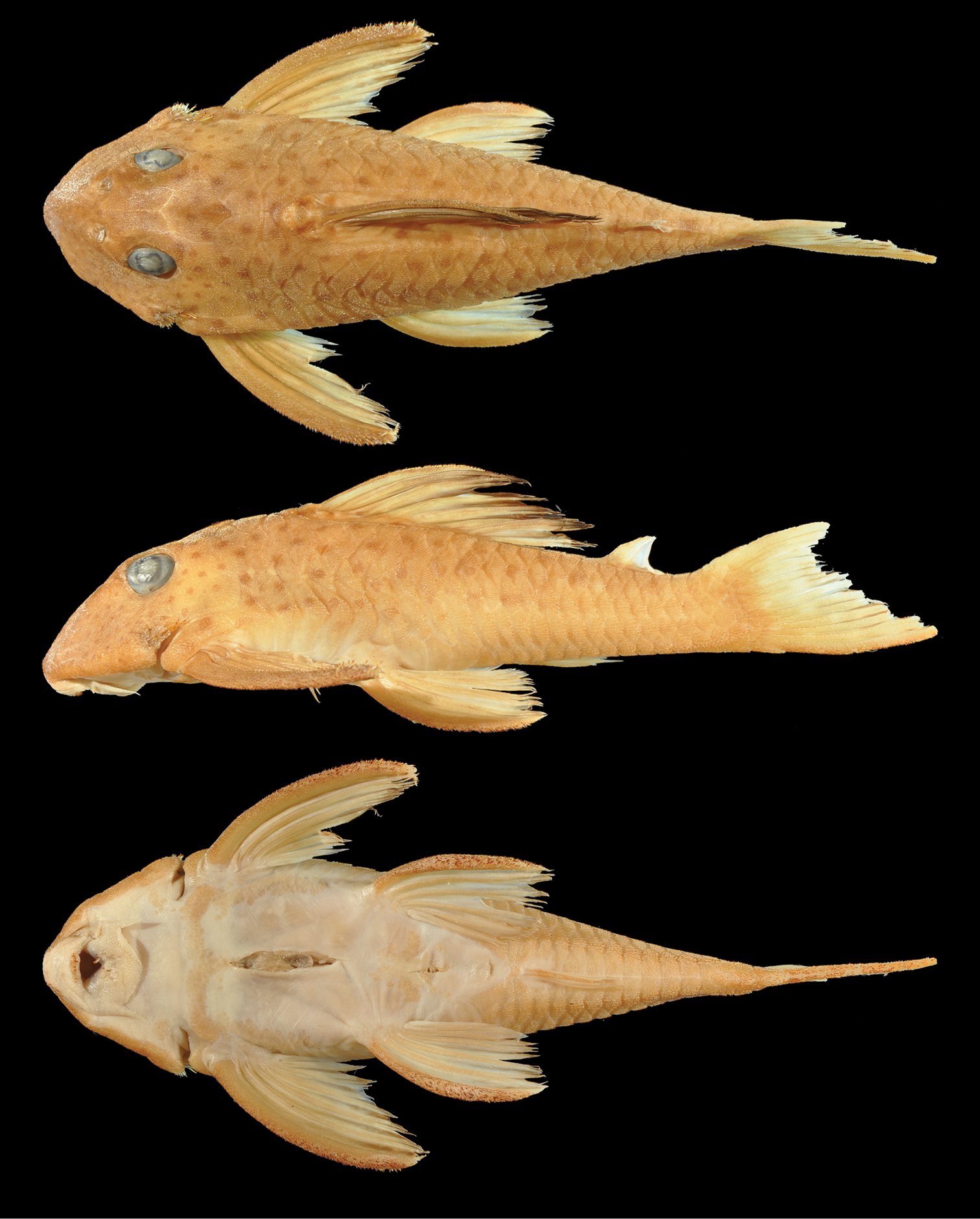

Scientific classification
- Kingdom: Animalia
- Phylum: Chordata
- Class: Actinopterygii
- Order: Siluriformes
- Family: Loricariidae
- Genus: Hypancistrus
- Species: H. phantasma

Binomial name
- Hypancistrus phantasma Tan & Armbruster, 2016

= Hypancistrus phantasma =

Species of catfish

Hypancistrus phantasma is a species of freshwater ray-finned fish belonging to the family Loricariidae, the suckermouth armoured catfishes, and the subfamily Hypostominae, the suckermouth catfishes. This catfish occurs in the Vaupés River in the Rio Negro drainage in the Amazon basin in Brazil. This species reaches a standard length of 12.3 cm (4.8 in)>. Its specific epithet, phantasma, means "phantom" in Latin, referring to the species' notable elusiveness and its pale coloration. It was described in 2016 by Milton Tan and Jonathan W. Armbruster on the basis of coloration, alongside the related species Hypancistrus margaritatus. H. phantasma was described based on only a small number of specimens collected in 1924, and it has reportedly not been collected since, nor is it known in the aquarium trade, unlike H. margaritatus.
