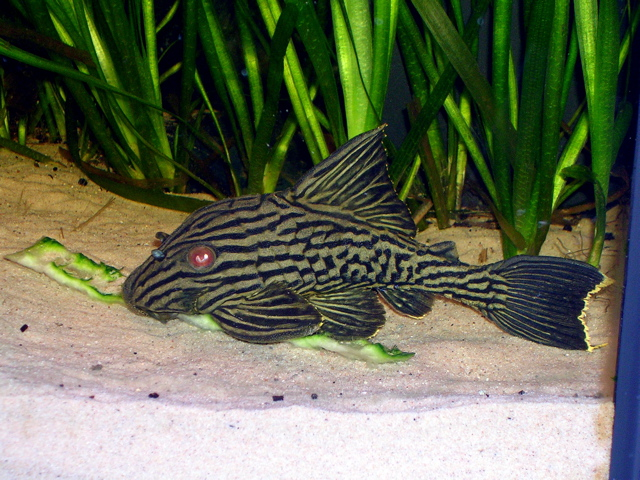
- Panaque nigrolineatus

Scientific classification
- Kingdom: Animalia
- Phylum: Chordata
- Class: Actinopterygii
- Division: Teleostei
- Order: Siluriformes
- Family: Loricariidae
- Subfamily: Hypostominae
- Tribe: Ancistrini; Kner, 1853

Genera
- Acanthicus Agassiz, 1829; Ancistrus Kner, 1854; Andeancistrus Lujan, Meza-Vargas & Barriga-Salazar, 2015; Araichthys Zawadzki, Bifi & Mariotto, 2016; Baryancistrus Rapp Py-Daniel, 1989; Chaetostoma Tschudi, 1846; Cordylancistrus Isbrücker, 1980; Corymbophanes C. H. Eigenmann, 1909; Dekeyseria Rapp Py-Daniel, 1985; Dolichancistrus Isbrücker, 1980; Exastilithoxus Isbrücker & Nijssen, 1979; Hemiancistrus Bleeker, 1862; Hopliancistrus Isbrücker & Nijssen, 1989; Hypancistrus Isbrücker & Nijssen, 1991; Lasiancistrus Regan, 1904; Leporacanthicus Isbrücker & Nijssen, 1989; Lithoxus Eigenmann, 1910; Megalancistrus Isbrücker, 1980; Micracanthicus Lujan & Armbruster, 2011; Neblinichthys Ferraris, Isbrücker & Nijssen, 1986; Panaqolus Isbrücker & Schraml, 2001; Panaque C. H. Eigenmann & R. S. Eigenmann, 1889; Parancistrus Bleeker, 1862; Paulasquama Armbruster & Taphorn, 2011; Peckoltia Miranda-Ribeiro, 1912; Pseudacanthicus Bleeker, 1862; Pseudancistrus Bleeker, 1862; Pseudolithoxus Isbrücker & Werner, 2001; Pseudoqolus Lujan, Cramer, Covain, Fisch-Muller & López-Fernández, 2017; Scobinancistrus Isbrücker & Nijssen, 1989; Spectracanthicus Nijssen & Isbrücker, 1987; Transancistrus Lujan, Meza-Vargas & Barriga-Salazar, 2015; Yaluwak Lujan & Armbruster, 2019

= Ancistrini =

Tribe of fishes

Ancistrini is a tribe of catfishes of the family Loricariidae. Most are restricted to tropical and subtropical South America, but there are also several genus (Ancistrus, Chaetostoma, Hemiancistrus and Lasiancistrus) in southern Central America.

== Taxonomy ==
Ancistrini have previously been considered a loricariid subfamily. However, the subfamily Hypostominae would be paraphyletic if Ancistrinae continued to be recognized. To continue recognizing the monophyly of this group while returning it to Hypostominae, Hypostominae was broken into several tribes. Pterygoplichthyini is sister to the tribe Ancistrini, which shares the derived presence of an evertible patch of plates on the cheek.

== Description ==
Most Ancistrini species (except for some Pseudancistrus and Spectracanthicus) can be separated from all other loricariids except the Pterygoplichthyini by the presence of evertible cheek plates with hypertrophied odontodes.
