= Leptoancistrus canensis =

Scientific classification
- Kingdom: Animalia
- Phylum: Chordata
- Class: Actinopterygii
- Order: Siluriformes
- Family: Loricariidae
- Genus: Leptoancistrus
- Species: L. canensis

Binomial name
- Leptoancistrus canensis (Meek & Hildebrand, 1913)

Synonyms
- Acanthicus canensis

Species of catfish

Leptoancistrus canensis is a species of catfish in the family Loricariidae. It is a freshwater fish native to Central America, where it occurs in the Pacific coastal drainages of eastern Panama, as well as the Armila River on Panama's Atlantic slope. The species reaches 7.6 cm (3 inches) in standard length.
