= Hypancistrus inspector =

Conservation status
- Least Concern (IUCN 3.1)

Scientific classification
- Kingdom: Animalia
- Phylum: Chordata
- Class: Actinopterygii
- Order: Siluriformes
- Family: Loricariidae
- Subfamily: Hypostominae
- Genus: Hypancistrus
- Species: H. inspector

Binomial name
- Hypancistrus inspector Armbruster, 2002

Species of fish

Hypancistrus inspector is a species of freshwater ray-finned fish belonging to the family Loricariidae, the suckermouth armoured catfishes, and the subfamily Hypostominae, the suckermouth catfishes. This catfish occurs in the upper Orinoco basin of Colombia and Venezuela, and in the basin of the Rio Negro in Brazil. This species reaches a standard length of 12.6 cm (5.0 in). This species is found in the aquarium trade where it is known as the snowball pleco or by the number L102.
