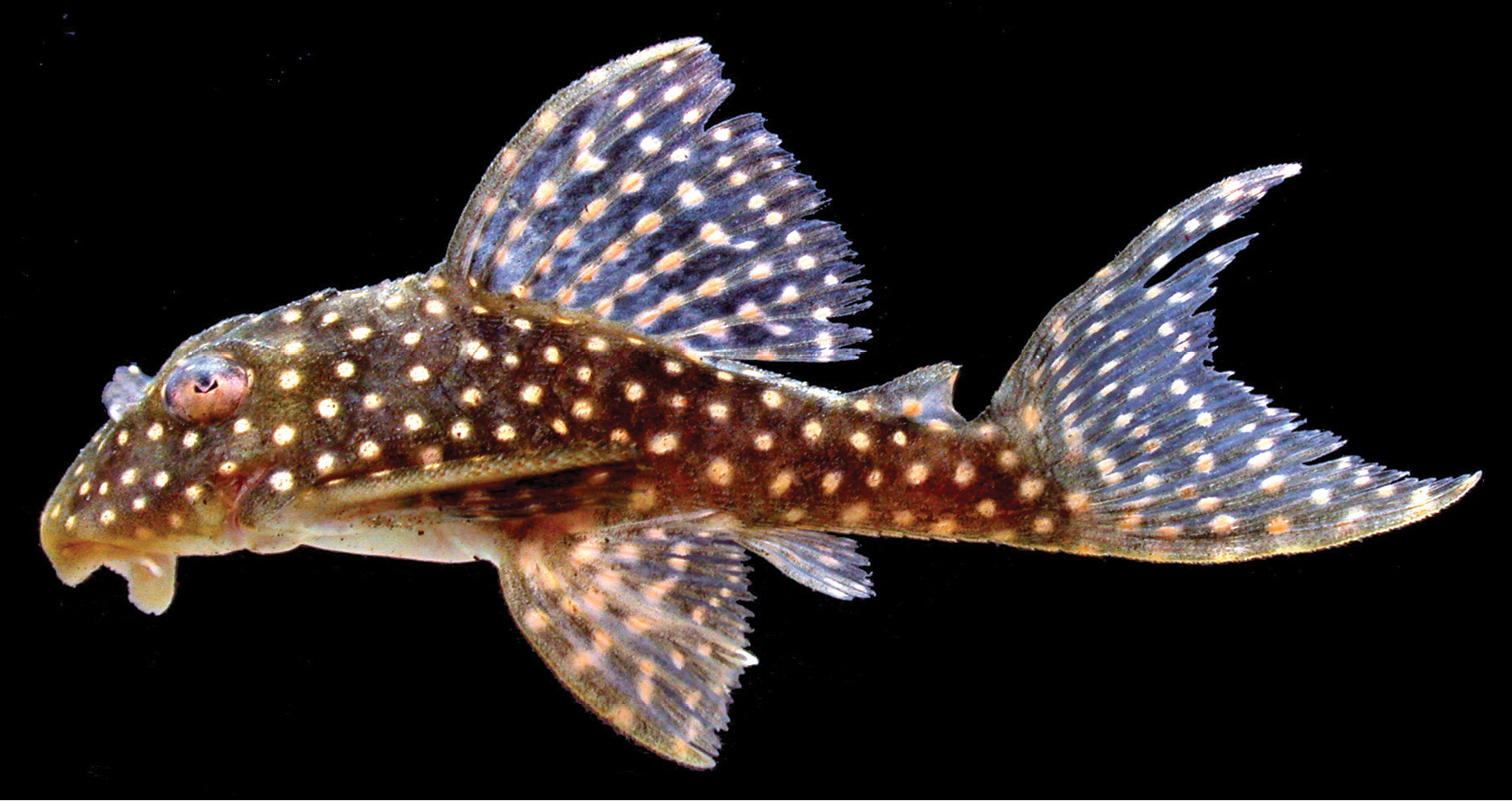

Conservation status
- Data Deficient (IUCN 3.1)

Scientific classification
- Kingdom: Animalia
- Phylum: Chordata
- Class: Actinopterygii
- Division: Teleostei
- Order: Siluriformes
- Family: Loricariidae
- Genus: Hypancistrus
- Species: H. margaritatus

Binomial name
- Hypancistrus margaritatus Tan & Armbruster, 2016

= Hypancistrus margaritatus =

Species of catfish

Hypancistrus margaritatus is a species of freshwater ray-finned fish belonging to the family Loricariidae, the suckermouth armoured catfishes, and the subfamily Hypostominae, the suckermouth catfishes. It is known only from its type locality of the Takutu River of Guyana, which is a tributary of the Branco River, which is in turn a tributary of the Rio Negro in the Amazon basin. The species reaches a standard length of 4.6 cm (1.8 in). Its specific epithet, margaritatus, means "adorned with pearls" in Latin, referring to its distinctive pearl-like white spots. It was described in 2016 by Milton Tan and Jonathan W. Armbruster on the basis of coloration, alongside the related species Hypancistrus phantasma.

This species appears in the aquarium trade, where it is most frequently referred to by its L-number, which is L-404, but is also known as the pearlspotted angel pleco.
