= Hypancistrus vandragti =

Conservation status
- Vulnerable (IUCN 3.1)

Scientific classification
- Kingdom: Animalia
- Phylum: Chordata
- Class: Actinopterygii
- Order: Siluriformes
- Family: Loricariidae
- Subfamily: Hypostominae
- Genus: Hypancistrus
- Species: H. vandragti

Binomial name
- Hypancistrus vandragti (Lujan & Armbruster, 2011)

Synonyms
- Micracanthicus vandragti Lujan & Armbruster, 2011

Genus of fishes

Hypancistrus vandragti is a species of freshwater ray-finned fish belonging to the family Loricariidae, the suckermouth armoured catfishes, and the subfamily Hypostominae, the suckermouth catfishes. This catfish is endemic to Venezuela where it occurs in the Ventuari River and the main channel of the upper Orinoco, in Amazonas where it is restricted to shallow, rocky rapids. This species reaches a standard length 4.2 cm (1.7 in). The specific name honours the American ichthyologist Randy Van Dragt, professor of biology at Calvin College who was an influence on Nathan K. Lujan's career. H. vandragti is found in the aquarium trade where it is known as the dwarf spiny pleco or L280.
