= Leptoancistrus =

Scientific classification
- Domain: Eukaryota
- Kingdom: Animalia
- Phylum: Chordata
- Class: Actinopterygii
- Order: Siluriformes
- Family: Loricariidae
- Subfamily: Hypostominae
- Genus: Leptoancistrus; Meek & Hildebrand, 1916

Type species
- Acanthicus canensis Meek & Hildebrand, 1913

Genus of fishes

Leptoancistrus is a genus of armored catfishes native to Colombia and Panama.

== Species ==
There are currently two recognized species in this genus:

- Leptoancistrus canensis (Meek & Hildebrand, 1913)
- Leptoancistrus cordobensis Dahl, 1964
