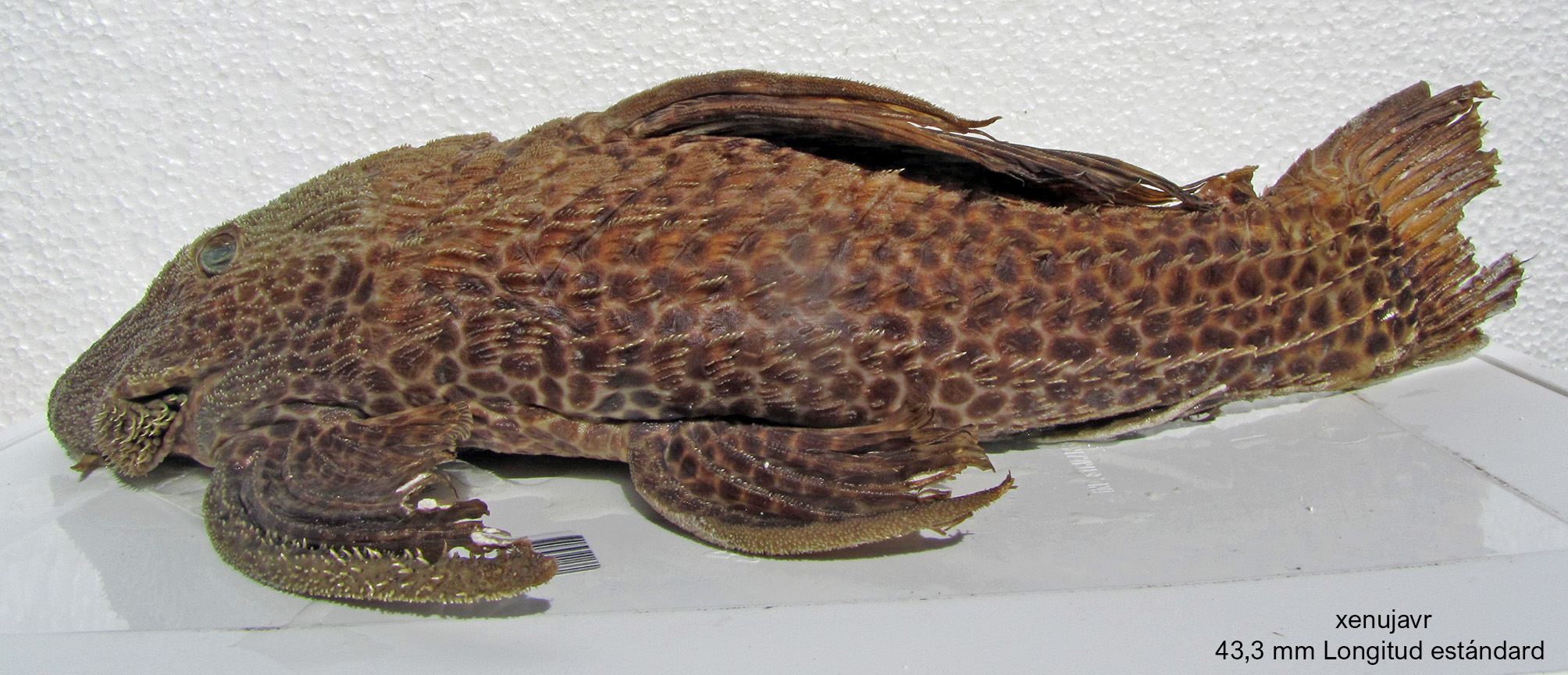
- Megalancistrus parananus

Scientific classification
- Kingdom: Animalia
- Phylum: Chordata
- Class: Actinopterygii
- Order: Siluriformes
- Family: Loricariidae
- Subfamily: Hypostominae
- Genus: Megalancistrus; Isbrücker, 1980

Type species
- Chaetostomus gigas Boulenger, 1895

= Megalancistrus =

Genus of fishes

Megalancistrus is a genus of freshwater ray-finned fishes belonging to the family Loricariidae, the suckermouth armoured catfishes, and the subfamily Hypostominae, the suckermouth catfishes. The catfishes in this genus are found in South America.

== Species ==
Megalancistrus contains the following valid species;

- Megalancistrus barrae (Steindachner, 1910)
- Megalancistrus parananus (W. K. H. Peters, 1881)

== Distribution ==
The genus Megalancistrus are found in the Río de la Plata and São Francisco River basins.

== Description ==
Megalancistrus species are large and spiny and generally have 10 dorsal-fin rays. The color on the sides and the abdomen is dark brown with very large spots on the head, sides, and fins or with light vermicualtions. The abdomen is completely plated in adults. The caudal fin is forked, but without filaments. Cheek odontodes, as in Acanthicus, are thin but numerous. The plates on the body are well keeled with rows of odontodes above and below the keel rows incomplete in specimens up to at least 20 cm (7.9 in).

== Ecology ==
Megalancistrus species are live in large rivers. These fish eat freshwater sponges and probably other invertebrates. They have been found with a lot of wood in the gut, but it appears as if this was consumed accidentally.
