= Araichthys =

Scientific classification
- Kingdom: Animalia
- Phylum: Chordata
- Class: Actinopterygii
- Order: Siluriformes
- Family: Loricariidae
- Subfamily: Hypostominae
- Genus: Araichthys; Zawadzki, Bifi & Mariotto, 2016
- Species: A. loro

Binomial name
- Araichthys loro Zawadzki, Bifi & Mariotto, 2016

Species of fish

Araichthys is a monospecific genus freshwater ray-finned fish belonging to the family Loricariidae, the suckermouth armoured catfishes, and the subfamily Hypostominae, the suckermouth catfishes. The only species in this genus is Araichthys loro. This genus, and its only species, were described in 2016 by Cláudio Henrique Zawadzki, Alessandro Gasparetto Bifi and Sandra Mariotto with its type locality given as Papagaio River, Sapezal, in the Tapajós drainage basin in the Brazilian state of Mato Grosso. The genus name, Araichthys, combibnes ara, the Tupi-Guarani word for "parrot" and a reference to the type locality, the Papagaio River, papagaio being Portuguese for parrot. The specific name, loro is also a referennce to the type locality as it is a common name for pet parrots in Brazil. Eschmeyer's Catalog of Fishes classifies this genus in the subfamily Hypostominae, the suckermouth catfishes, within the suckermouth armored catfish family Loricariidae. It has also been classified in the tribe Ancistrini by some authorities.
