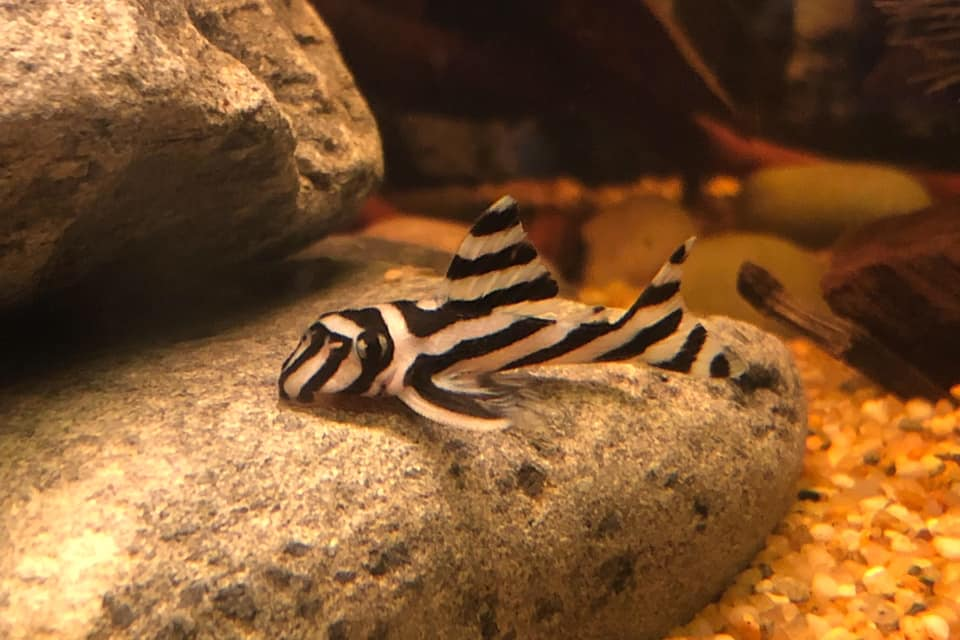
- Captive bred juvenile - Photo: M.Sykes

Conservation status
- Critically Endangered (IUCN 3.1)
- CITES Appendix II

Scientific classification
- Kingdom: Animalia
- Phylum: Chordata
- Class: Actinopterygii
- Order: Siluriformes
- Family: Loricariidae
- Genus: Hypancistrus
- Species: H. zebra

Binomial name
- Hypancistrus zebra Isbrücker & Nijssen, 1991

= Zebra pleco =

Species of suckermouth catfish

The zebra pleco (Hypancistrus zebra) is a species of freshwater ray-finned fish belonging to the family Loricariidae, the suckermouth armoured catfishes, and the subfamily Hypostominae, the suckermouth catfishes. This catfish is endemic to a small section of the Rio Xingu in Brazil. It occurs in the big bend area of the river, downstream from the town of Altamira, Para. It was first described in 1991. It gets its name from its black and white stripes, resembling the colouration of a zebra. This species grows to a length of 6.4 centimetres (2.5 in) SL. This species was exported from Brazil in 1987 for sale as aquarium fish. However, currently, the Brazilian government bans the export of certain fish species, including H. zebra.

H. zebra is threatened by the Belo Monte Dam in the Xingu river which has caused a severe reduction of the water flow of the entire known distribution range of the species. Due to this, the species has been classified as critically endangered and may soon become extinct in the wild. It is subject to several captive breeding programs. It is commercially bred in captivity for the aquarium trade.

Mature males have a wider head and longer interopercular spines than females. After spawning, the males will guard the eggs. The fry swim after seven days and absorb the yolk sac in two weeks.

== In the aquarium ==
The minimum tank size for the species is said to be a minimum of 30 gallons (approximately 115 liters). Maintaining water parameters at certain levels is also of importance when keeping them in an aquarium.

The ideal water temperature for their tank is about 79–88 °F (26–31 °C). Reasonable water acidity levels are 6.5 pH to 7.0 pH with the water hardness ranging between 2 and 6 dKH.

Hypancistrus zebra can be referred to using the L-numbering convention often applied to Loricariidae, although, unlike most loricariids, H. zebra has two associated L-numbers: L-046 and L-098 both refer to the species. H. zebra is a predator and requires a high protein diet, typically including small invertebrates such as insect larvae. When in captivity, the species is often fed fresh or frozen bloodworms, brine shrimp and algae wafers. Occasionally, the species may be fed vegetables such as lettuce, cucumber, and squash.

This species should not be kept in the typical community aquarium, or with discus, despite advice to the contrary. These catfish thrive in biotopes with small dither fish which do not compete with H. zebra for food.

The tank should mimic their natural environment with a substrate of small smooth gravel and pebbles with smooth boulders, cobbles and rocks forming caves and crevices. The water must be highly oxygenated with a strong flow and surface agitation.

It is an expensive species because it can only be collected or reproduced in small numbers. It is a simple fish to keep but it needs clean, warm water and a fast-moving current. They are unlikely to survive in still water or a dirty environment. It is nocturnal, moderately territorial, and prefers plenty of hiding places.

In 2004, the zebra pleco was added to the IBAMA list of endangered species and exporting it from Brazil was made illegal. However, this law is only present in Brazil and black market fish traders smuggle them out of Brazil to then sell in other countries (primarily Colombia).

== Breeding behaviour ==
Similarly to other Hypancistrus species, the male will trap the female in a cave where she will lay her eggs for the male to fertilise. This is usually done at around a pH of 6.5-7.2 and a water tempurature of 27 °C. This process can take between 1 and 5 days depending on the experience the female has in motherhood. The male will often bite the female to keep her in the cave, which is a natural behaviour for the species. Once the eggs are fertilised, the female will leave, although the male will guard the eggs until they hatch and may even stay to see them develop into fry. Once born, the fry will have a yolk sack attached to their underbelly, which is typically gone in a few days.

== Conservation ==
The species is listed in Appendix II of the Convention on International Trade in Endangered Species (CITES) meaning that international trade (including in captive bred specimens) is regulated by the CITES permitting system.

== See also ==
- List of freshwater aquarium fish species
