= Ventuari River =

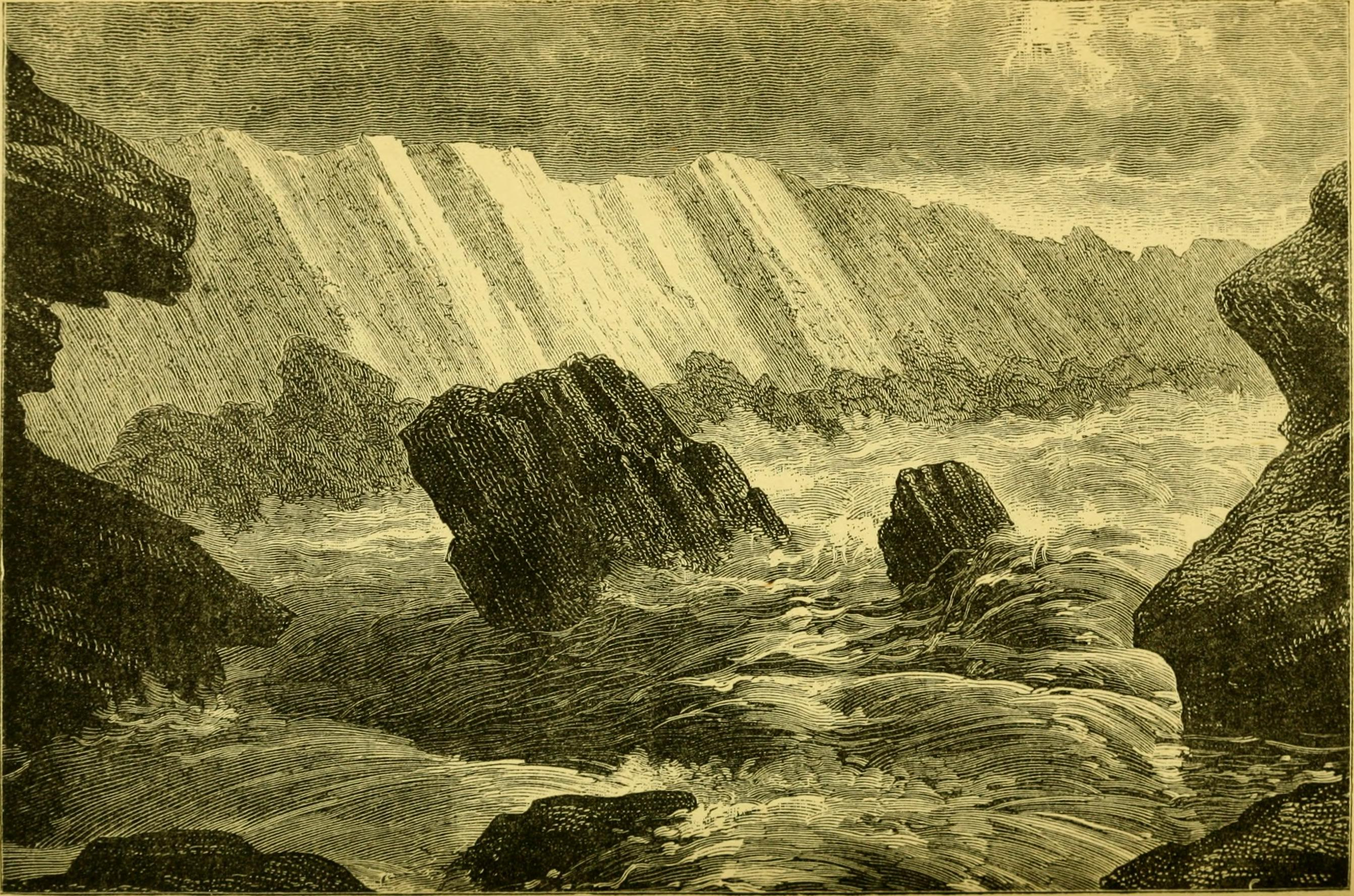

- Mouth location in Venezuela
- Native name: Rio Ventuari (Spanish)

Location
- Country: Venezuela

Physical characteristics
- Mouth
  - coordinates: 3°59′40″N 67°02′07″W
- Length: 520 km (320 mi)
- Basin size: 40,000 km^{2} (15,000 sq mi)
- Discharge
  - average: 2,000 m^{3}/s (71,000 cu ft/s)

Basin features
- River system: Orinoco

The Ventuari River is the largest tributary of the Orinoco in southern Venezuela. The Ventuari flows from south-central Venezuela in the Guiana Highlands southwest into the Orinoco River. It is 520 km (320 mi) long and its major tributary is the Manapiare River.

The river drains the Guayanan Highlands moist forests ecoregion. The Ventuari River is the largest clearwater tributary of the Orinoco. As of 2006, 470 fish species were known from the river, including several endemics, and a few new species have been described from the river since then.
