= Benoliel =

Benoliel (also spelled Ben Oliel) is a Sephardic Jewish surname. It is patronymic, meaning 'son of Oliel'. Notable individuals with the surname include:

== Benoliel ==
- Benjamin Jack Benoliel (1943–2017), American composer
- Bernard Benoliel (born 1965), French film critic
- David Benoliel (1934–2025), French-British writer
- Jack Benoliel (1928–2017), Argentine journalist
- Jeanne Quint Benoliel (1919–2012), American nurse
- José Benoliel (1858–1937), Moroccan writer
- Joshua Benoliel (1873–1932), Portuguese journalist
- Mady Benoliel Benzecry (1933–2003), Brazilian artist
- Philippe Bénoliel (born 1978), French race car driver
- Raphaël Benoliel (born 1974), French film producer
- Sara Benoliel (1898–1970), Brazilian-Portuguese doctor and feminist

== Ben-Oliel ==
- Ricardo Ben-Oliel (born 1944), Israeli academic
