= Mady Benoliel Benzecry =

Brazilian painter

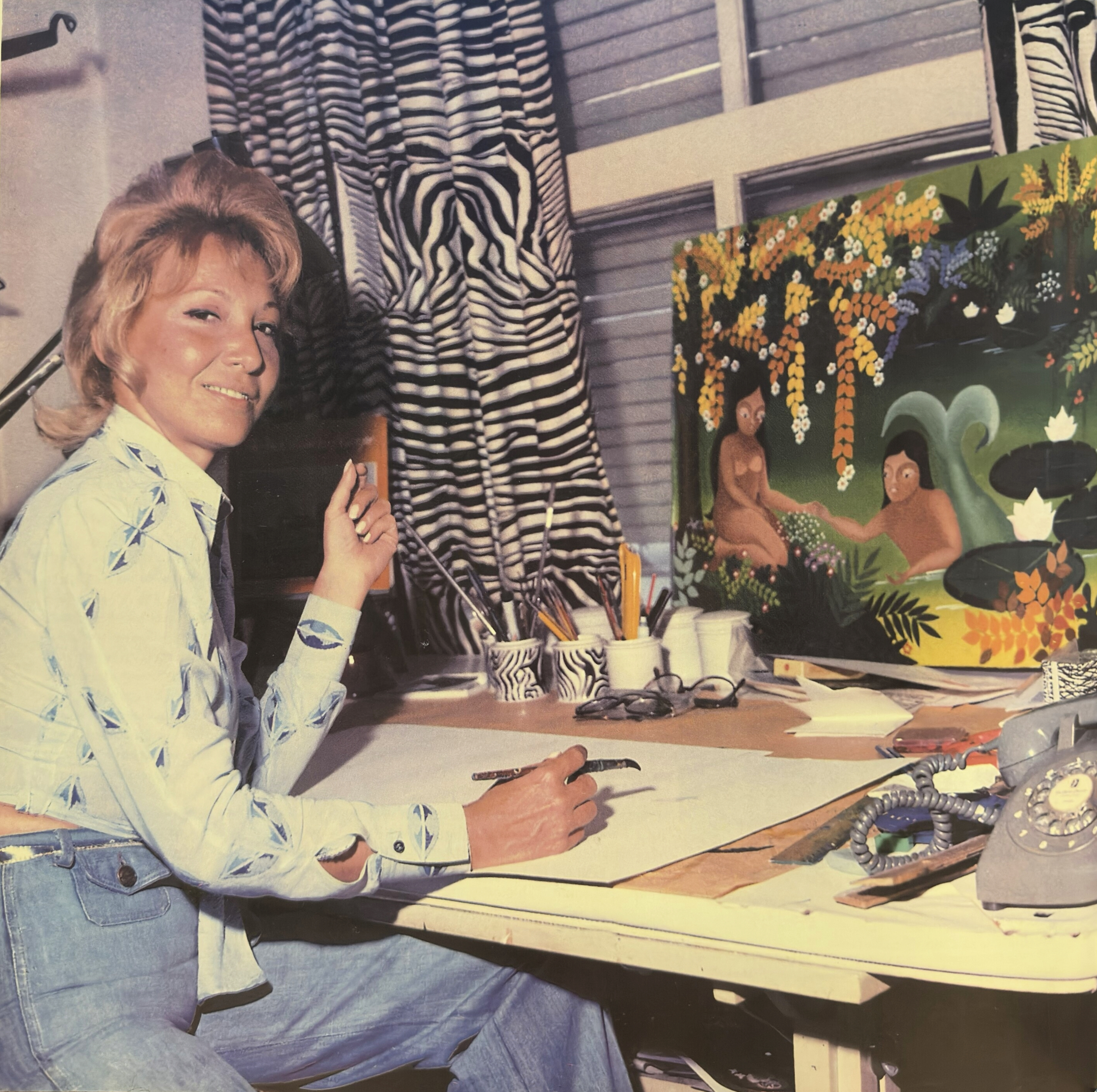
- Benzecry painting in her studio
- Born: Messody Benoliel Benzecry; 19 February 1933; Manaus, Brazil
- Died: 11 June 2003 (aged 70); Rio de Janeiro, Brazil
- Known for: Painting, poetry
- Movement: Naïve art
- Spouse: Eugênio Carlos Batista

Mady Benoliel Benzecry, born Messody Benoliel Benzecry (Manaus, 19 February 1933 – Rio de Janeiro, 11 June 2003), known professionally as Mady Benzecry, was a Brazilian visual artist, poet and musician of Sephardic Jewish descent, whose paintings combined Amazonian themes such as Iemanjá and the meeting of the Negro and Solimões rivers with biblical and Sephardic motifs. Her naïve paintings drew renewed attention in 2023, when one of them was placed in the office of the First Lady of Brazil at the Palácio do Planalto.

== Biography ==
Benzecry was born in Manaus into a traditional family of Moroccan Jews. Her father, Jacob Paulo Levy Benoliel, was a Moroccan-Portuguese Jew described as strict. She married at the age of 16 and had two children, Jacob Elias Benzecry (Elly) and Norma Nellie. She later moved to Rio de Janeiro, where she remarried the sculptor Eugênio Carlos, known artistically as Batista. She died in Rio de Janeiro in June 2003.

== Literary work ==
In her youth Benzecry devoted herself to poetry. Her first book, De todos os crepúsculos ("Of All Twilights", 1964), explored themes of love and desire. In Sarandalhas (1967), her last published volume, she revisits memories of her childhood in Manaus. The book is divided into four parts: A criação da Bahia, Baú da Infância, 5 Cantilenas and Esparsas. Both books were illustrated by the Amazonian artist Moacir Andrade.

According to Conde da Silva, the jacket of Sarandalhas carries blurbs by Jorge Amado, who noted "her high flights" (seus altos voos) and the lyricism of her childhood recollections, and Luís da Câmara Cascudo, who praised its "genius" and "exceptional lyricism".

=== Poetic themes ===
Benzecry's poetry centres on memory, childhood reminiscence and family heritage. Poems such as Baú da Infância evoke relatives and Moroccan-Jewish figures, like the grandmother Alegria, a symbolic keeper of tradition. Amazonian culture appears in the depiction of local characters and in references to regional cuisine.

== Visual art ==
After her literary period, Benzecry turned to painting. According to Mário Margutti's biography (2003), she was encouraged by the critic Walmir Ayala and turned to Amazonian themes. Self-taught, she produced colourful and symbolic scenes characterised by fine drawing and flat colours. Her work is associated with Naïve art, with themes linked to motherhood, Amazonian mythology and Jewish tradition. She is part of a broader group of Brazilian naive artists which includes Emídio de Souza, Heitor dos Prazeres, Djanira, Romero Britto, and, in Amazonas, Renato Araújo. On 13 January 2023, the First Lady of Brazil Janja da Silva placed a painting from Benzecry's Festival do Mar series at the entrance to her office in the Palácio do Planalto, in Brasília, following the 8 January 2023 vandalism.

=== Notable themes and works ===
Recurring themes in her oeuvre include:

- Festival do Mar – a depiction of Bahian women at a festival of Iemanjá;
- Cidade Flutuante – riverside life and the Amazonian caboclo;
- As Amazonas I – a retelling of the legend of the warrior women, set in the forest;
- Natividade II – an Indigenous motherhood scene;
- Jardim do Éden – an Amazonian version of the biblical theme;
- Arca de Noé – the flood interpreted as an Amazonian river crossing;
- O Encontro das Águas – an allegory of the meeting of the Negro and Solimões rivers.

Other works include the bronze sculpture Moisés and the painting O violinista no telhado.

== Recognition ==
According to Margutti's biography (2003), Benzecry and the sculptor Batista held tours and exhibitions in Brazil and abroad, with support from institutions such as Citibank and Varig, presented as "ambassadors of the Brazilian soul" — the phrase that gives the biography its title. Margutti (2003) also states that in 1969 she was honoured by the Academia Amazonense de Letras for her contribution to Amazonian literature.

== Bibliography ==
- Benzecry, Mady (1964). De todos os crepúsculos (in Portuguese). Rio de Janeiro: Editora José Álvaro.
- Benzecry, Mady (1967). Sarandalhas (in Portuguese). Rio de Janeiro: Editora Pongetti. OL 12186872W.

== Gallery ==
Works by Mady Benzecry

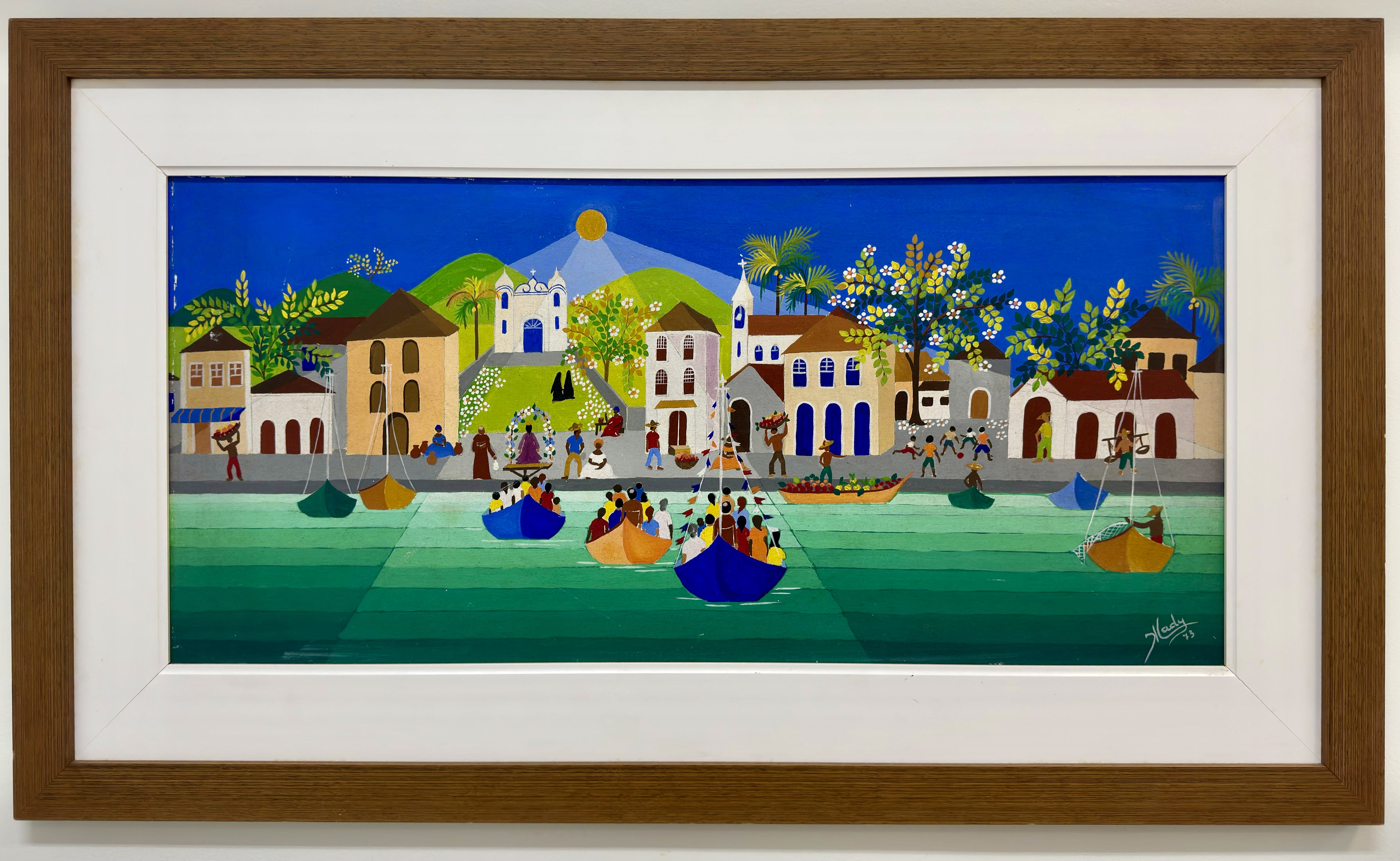
Oil on canvas by Mady Benzecry (1973)

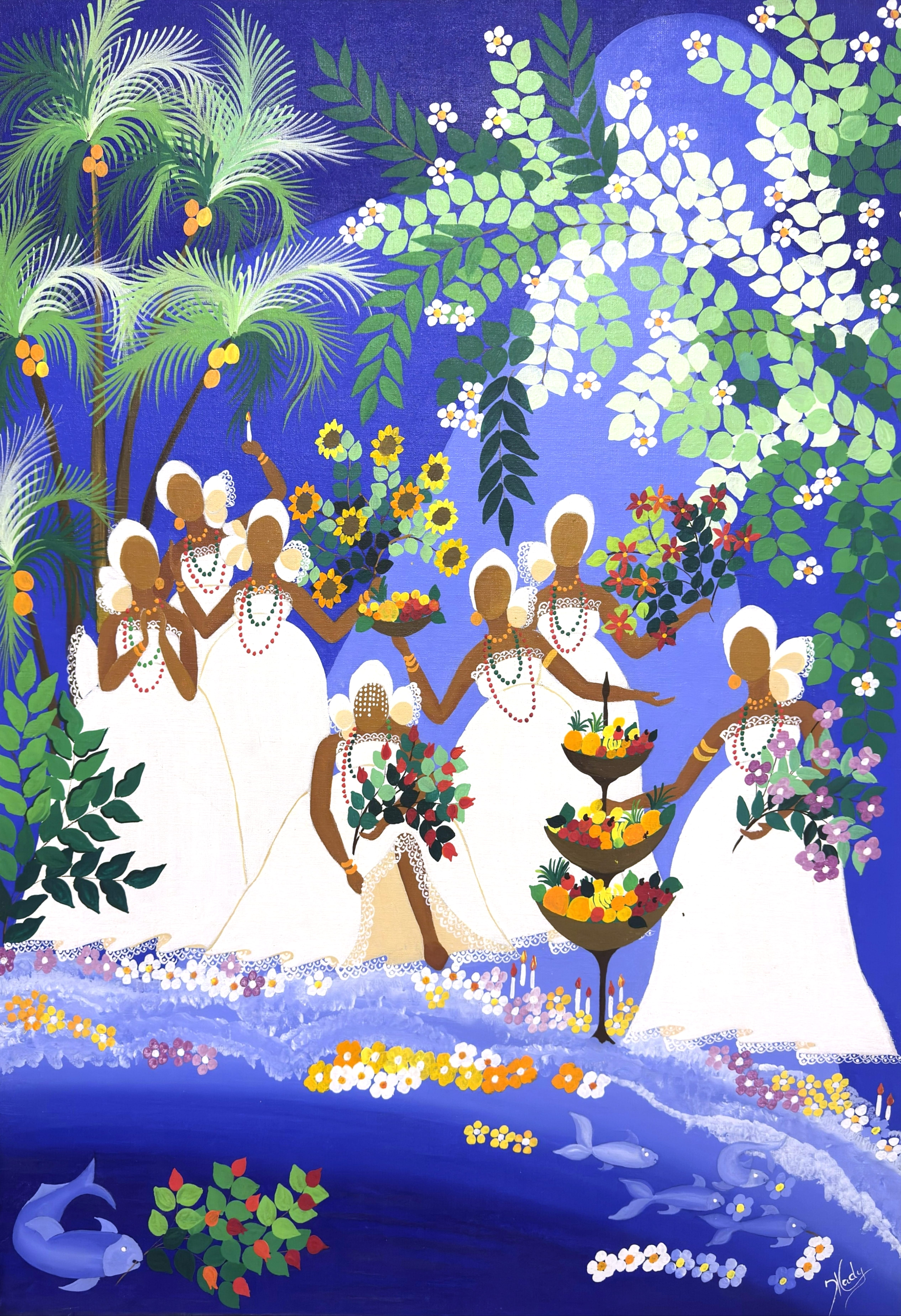
Festival do Mar, c. 1970
