= Acarabu Island =

Island in Brazil

Geography
- Location: Amazonas, Brazil
- Coordinates: 0°23′0″S 66°22′0″W

Administration
- Brazil

Acarabu Island (Portuguese: Ilha Acarabu) is a river island located at the confluence of the rivers Negro and Marié, in the state of Amazonas, Brazil.

== Etymology ==
"Acarabu" is a term of Tupi origin that means "noise of the cará" by the junction of akará (cará) and pu (noise).
