= Hillblazers =

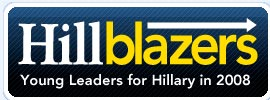
Logo

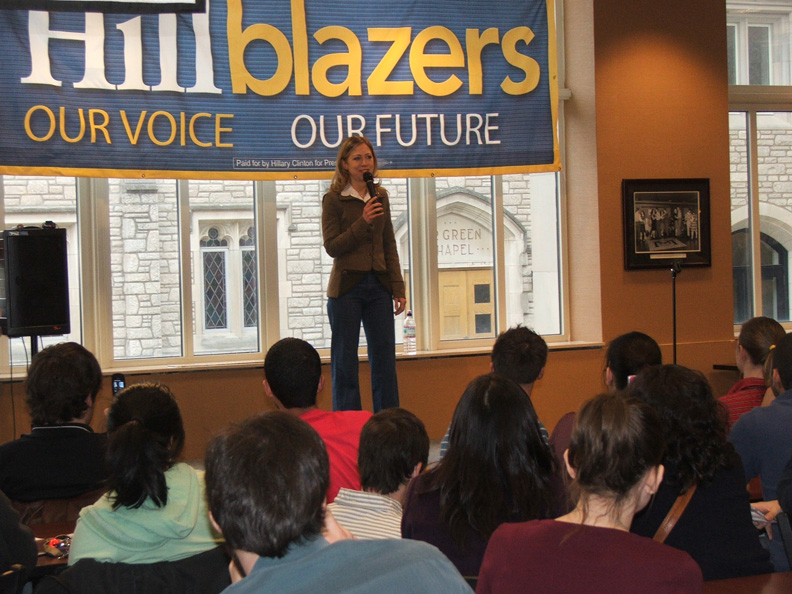
Chelsea Clinton meeting with Hillblazers in 2008

Hillblazers was a Youth Movement organized by Hillary Clinton's two presidential campaigns. The goal of the movement was to serve as a nationwide activist platform for young and first-time voters supporting Hillary Clinton. The term later morphed to describes Clinton's top fundraisers.

== Origins ==
Hillblazers was unveiled during the time of Sen. Hillary Clinton's campaign in the 2008 US Presidential Election. The unveiling occurred at Wellesley College, during one of her first US Presidential Campaign stops. Hillblazers originated in New York, New York, originally to promote and support Sen. Hillary Clinton's campaign, then evolved nationwide into a social networking program aimed at hosting fundraisers, and other Democratic social activities.

== Activities ==
Hillblazers was a platform for Democratic voters to demonstrate and unite with other Hillary Clinton supporters and young Democrats nationwide. Hillblazers was directed and looked after by Chelsea Clinton, and actresses America Ferrera and Amber Tamblyn.

Hillblazers was supported by student leaders all across America from schools to colleges; 352 alone in New Hampshire to hundreds more at schools like University of California, Penn-State, Notre Dame, to Kentucky Supporting Sen. Hillary Clinton's past and future campaigns from donating, funding to phone-banking and other youth Democratic activities. All the schools involved with Hillblazers united to assist and generate the youth and young voters to the platform from Penn-State generating out the media essence of Hillblazers by promoting and featuring such media outlets such as SplashCast's website designed 'HillarySpeaksForMe.com' and the short Hillblazers feature produced by Clinton advocate; Lucas Baiano, to Wellesley College heavily looking after the main recruiting of the Hillblazers Platform for young Democratic social activities to a wide range of fundraising.
