= America Ferrera =

American actress (born 1984)

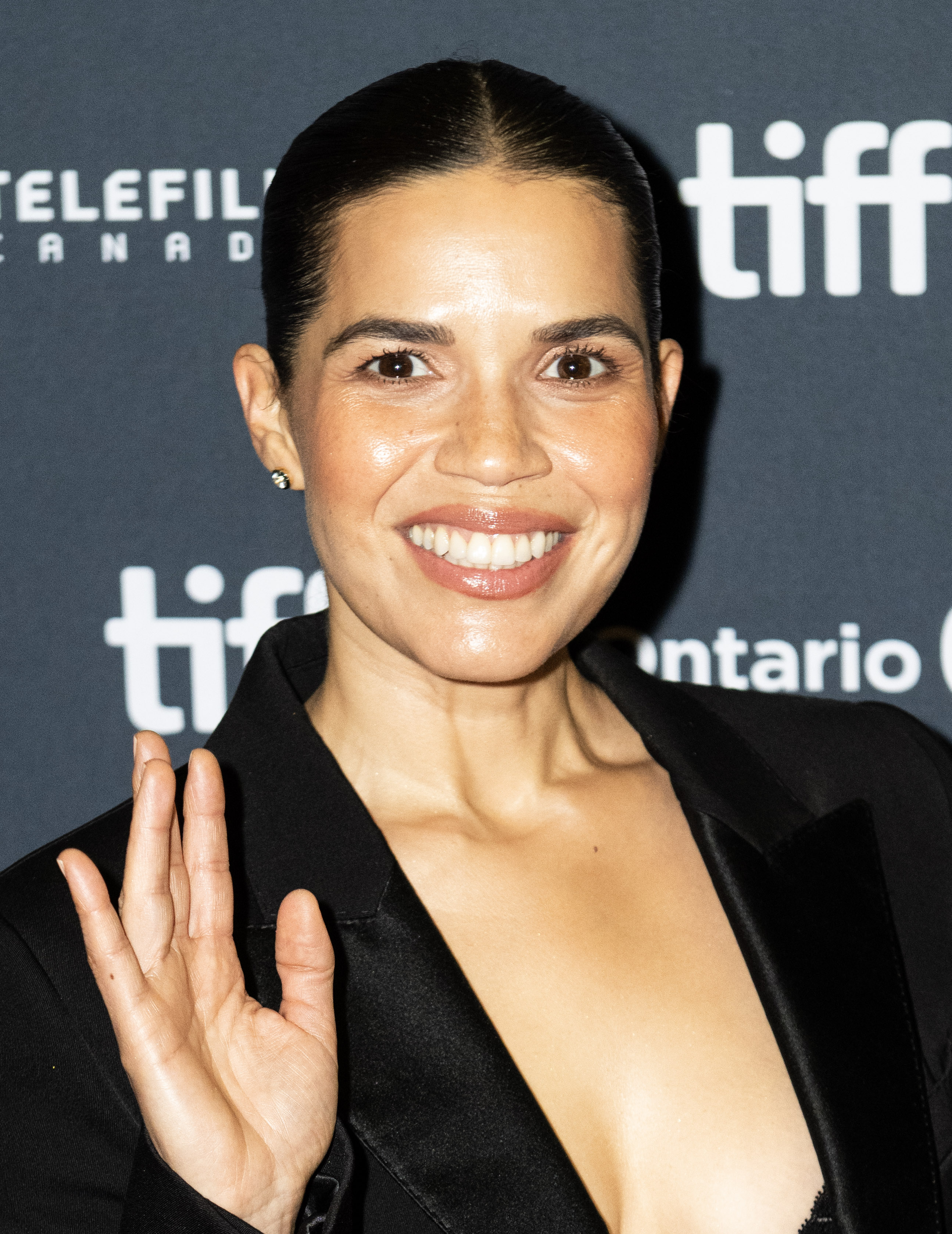
- Ferrera in 2025
- Born: America Georgina Ferrera; April 18, 1984 (age 42); Los Angeles, California, U.S.
- Education: University of Southern California (B.A.)
- Occupations: Actress; producer
- Years active: 2002–present
- Spouse: Ryan Piers Williams (m. 2011)
- Children: 2
- Awards: Full list

America Georgina Ferrera (/fəˈrɛərə/; born April 18, 1984) is an American actress. She has received numerous accolades, including a Primetime Emmy Award, a Golden Globe Award, and a Screen Actors Guild Award, in addition to an Academy Award nomination. In 2007 and 2024, Time named her one of the 100 most influential people in the world and in 2023, she was named in BBC's 100 Women list.

Ferrera developed an interest in acting at a young age, performing in several stage productions at her school. She made her feature film debut in 2002 with the comedy-drama Real Women Have Curves, earning praise for her performance. She achieved modest success early in her career with roles in films such as the comedy-dramas Gotta Kick It Up! (2002) and The Sisterhood of the Traveling Pants (2005). She garnered further critical acclaim and recognition for her starring role as Betty Suarez in the ABC comedy-drama series Ugly Betty (2006–2010). For her performance, she won a Golden Globe Award, a Screen Actors Guild Award, and a Primetime Emmy Award for Outstanding Lead Actress in a Comedy Series, the first for a Latina woman in the category.

Ferrera's other film roles include the drama The Dry Land (2010), the romantic comedy Our Family Wedding (2010), the crime drama End of Watch (2012), and the fantasy comedy Barbie (2023), which earned her a nomination for the Academy Award for Best Supporting Actress. She also voiced Astrid Hofferson in the How to Train Your Dragon franchise (2010–2019) and co-produced and starred in the NBC workplace comedy series Superstore (2015–2021).

== Early life and education ==
Ferrera, the youngest of six children, was born in Los Angeles, California. Her parents, América Griselda Ayes and Carlos Gregorio Ferrera, immigrated to the United States from Tegucigalpa, Honduras in the mid-1970s. Ferrera has stated that she has Lenca ancestry. Her mother worked as the director of the housekeeping staff for one of the Hilton Hotels, and stressed the importance of higher education. When Ferrera was seven, her parents divorced and her father returned to Honduras. Ferrera was estranged from her father when he died there in 2010.

Ferrera was raised in the Woodland Hills section of Los Angeles, where she attended Calabash Street Elementary School, George Ellery Hale Middle School and El Camino Real High School. At age seven she played a small role in a school production of Hamlet, and when she was 10 she played the Artful Dodger in Oliver!.

While at El Camino High School, she took acting lessons. She entered the University of Southern California (USC) on a presidential scholarship, double-majoring in theatre and international relations. She dropped out to focus on her acting career, but completed her bachelor's degree in May 2013.

== Career ==
=== Debut and early roles (2002–2005) ===
In July 2002, Ferrera appeared in her first television film, Gotta Kick It Up! for The Disney Channel. While at a theatre program at Northwestern University that same year, she made her feature movie debut in Real Women Have Curves. Ferrera followed this with roles in television (Touched by an Angel). She also appeared in the movie Plainsong, based on the novel by Kent Haruf, which also featured Aidan Quinn and Rachel Griffiths. Ferrera played a pregnant teenager, Victoria Roubideaux, who has been kicked out of her mother's house; she is taken in by two kindly brothers who live alone on a farm. In the 2005 film How the Garcia Girls Spent Their Summer, she starred as Bianca, a 17-year-old third-generation Mexican-American who is disgusted with the boys in her neighborhood but finds romance with a boy from a neighboring town. In 2006, she appeared in the short film 3:52, which won the Audience Award at the San Diego Women Film Festival. Later that year, she featured in the movie Steel City, which received nominations at the Film Independent Spirit Awards and the Sundance Film Festival. In December 2005, she appeared in the Off-Broadway play Dog Sees God: Confessions of a Teenage Blockhead, directed by Trip Cullman.

=== Breakthrough and rise to fame (2006–2010) ===
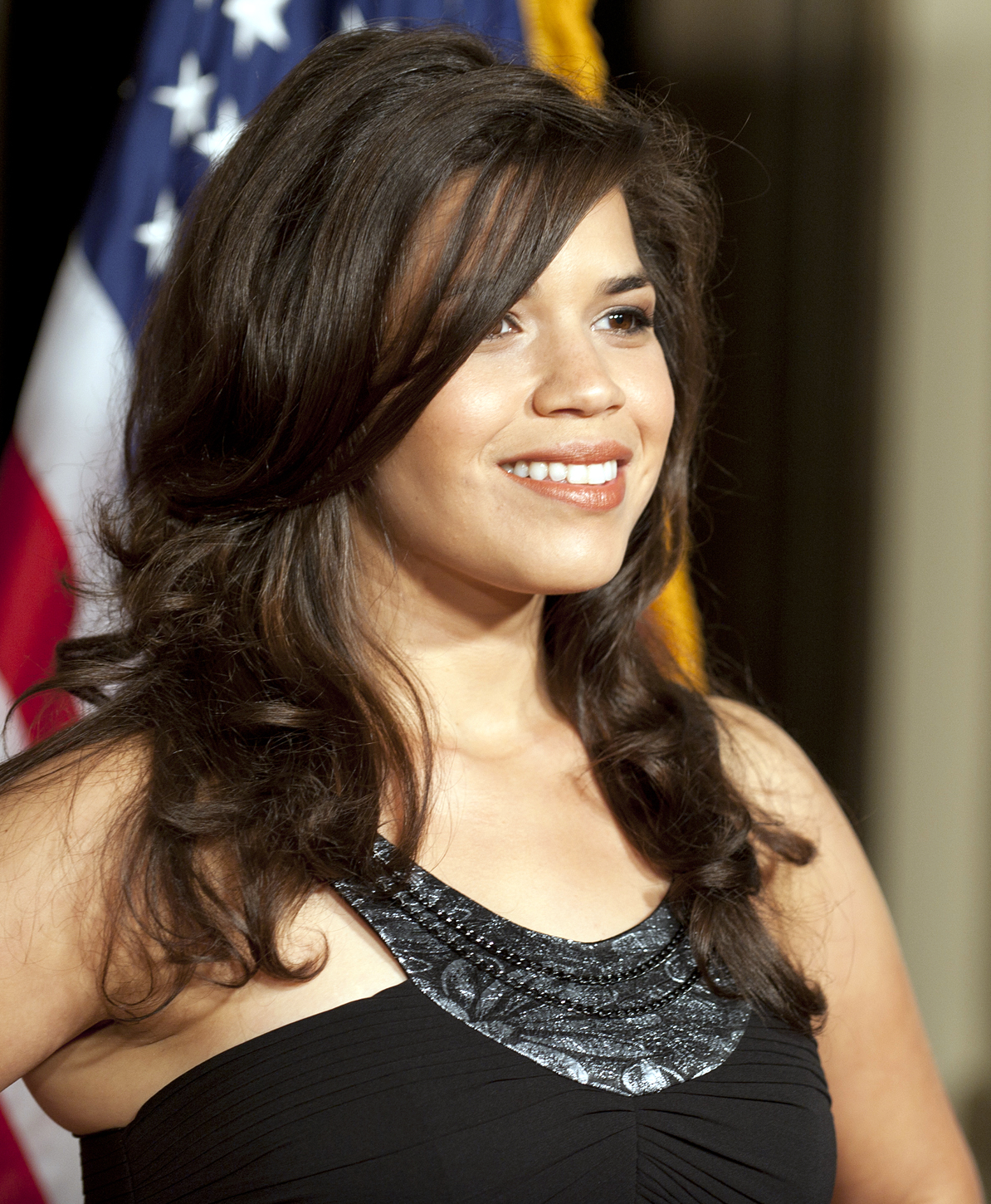
Ferrera at the 2010 Voice Awards

In 2006, Ferrera landed the lead role of Betty Suarez in ABC's new comedy-drama Ugly Betty, an adaptation of the successful Colombian telenovela Yo soy Betty, la fea (1999–2001), in which Ferrera portrays a girl whom her peers find extremely unattractive, thus the series title. As Betty Suarez, Ferrera wears braces, has bushy eyebrows and a disheveled wig, and cosmetics and clothing intended to downplay her own looks, in contrast to most of the "glammed up" characters; Ferrera invented the term "Bettification" to describe the process of creating her onscreen persona. In 2007, Ferrera won numerous accolades for her performance in the series; she also won the "triple crown" for acting in television; she won the Golden Globe Award for Best Actress – Television Series Musical or Comedy, the Screen Actors Guild Award for Outstanding Performance by a Female Actor in a Comedy Series, and the Primetime Emmy Award for Outstanding Lead Actress in a Comedy Series, becoming the first Latina woman to win the Outstanding Lead Actress Award.

In the wake of her Golden Globe win, Ferrera was congratulated by Hilda L. Solis in the United States House of Representatives and was commended for "helping to break down stereotypes and provide a role model for young Latinas". Time included Ferrera in their 2007 list of the 100 most influential people in the world. Also in 2007, Ferrera won the Imagen Foundation's Creative Achievement Award. Ferrera starred as Carmen in the 2005 film The Sisterhood of the Traveling Pants, and reprised the role in 2008's The Sisterhood of the Traveling Pants 2. Among other film work, she voice the role of Astrid in the hit animated film How to Train Your Dragon (2010). She also appeared in The Dry Land which premiered at the 2010 Sundance Film Festival and ran at the Dallas International Film Festival where it won the top prize in the Filmmaker Award for Best Narrative Feature.

=== Post-Ugly Betty projects and Superstore (2011–2022) ===
Ferrera made her London stage debut on November 7, 2011, playing Roxie Hart in the musical Chicago in London's West End. In 2012, Ferrera was featured in the four-hour documentary Half the Sky: Turning Oppression into Opportunity for Women Worldwide, which premiered on PBS October 1 and 2, 2012. The series introduces women and girls living in very difficult circumstances and struggling to challenge them. The Half the Sky PBS TV series is produced by Show of Force along with Fugitive Films. Ferrera starred alongside David Cross and Julia Stiles in the dark comedy It's a Disaster, which premiered at the 2012 Los Angeles Film Festival and had a limited commercial release on April 12, 2013.

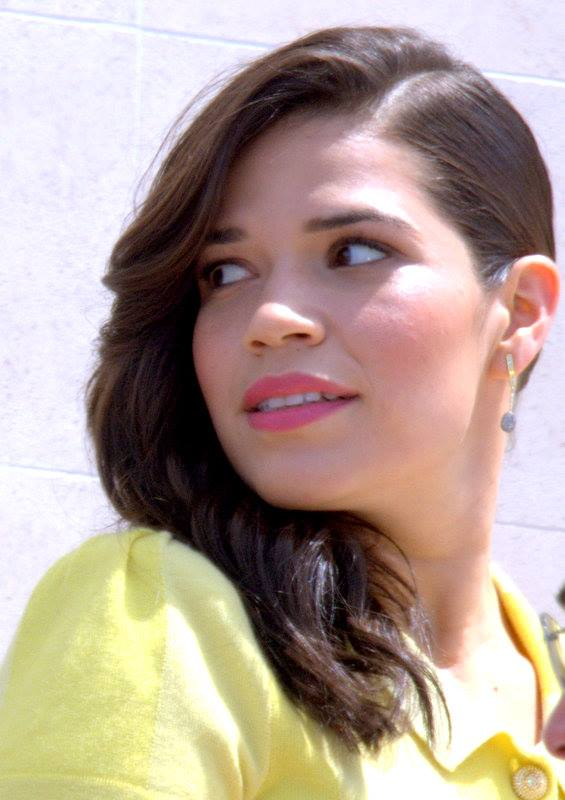
Ferrera in 2014

On May 17, 2013, ABC announced that Ferrera was cast in a limited-run telenovela titled Pedro & Maria, a modern-day take on Romeo and Juliet set in Washington, D.C. The series had been in development at MTV since 2010 with Ferrera serving as a director on the project, which would have interactive participation online content from viewers. ABC later decided not to move forward with the series. On March 16, 2015, Ferrera was added to the cast of the upcoming NBC sitcom Superstore, portraying Amy, a 10-year veteran floor supervisor at a superstore named Cloud 9. In addition to her main role, Ferrera also had co-production duties for the series. After NBC had initially announced a sixth season of the series, the network revealed on February 28, 2020, that Ferrera would be departing the series at the end of the fifth season citing new projects and spending time with family. Due to the COVID-19 pandemic shutting down Superstore's fifth season with one episode left to film, her departure was delayed into season 6 in order to give her character's arc a proper closure. On March 10, 2021, NBC announced that Ferrera would return for the show's one-hour series finale.

In February 2019, it was announced that Ferrera would be credited as an executive producer and director for the Netflix comedy-drama series Gentefied. The series premiered on February 21, 2020.

=== Further projects and Barbie (2023–present) ===
In February 2021, it was announced that Ferrera would make her feature length directorial debut with I Am Not Your Perfect Mexican Daughter, based on the young adult novel of the same name by Erika L. Sánchez. Adapted by Linda Yvette Chávez, the film will be a co-production with Orion Pictures, Anonymous Content, Aevitas Creative Management and MACRO. In 2023, Ferrera appeared as Gloria in the film Barbie, for which she received Academy Award, SAG, and two Critics' Choice nominations (Supporting Actress and Ensemble Cast).

In February 2024 it was announced that Ferrera would star in and executive produce an Amazon Prime Video series about artist Ana Mendieta. The work is based on a book by Robert Katz, to be scripted by Cherise Castro Smith and co-executive produced by Amazon MGM Studios and Plan B Entertainment. She appeared in the third season of Marvel Studios' What If...? as Ranger Morales, a brand-new original character. She was originally set to star in Pixar's sci-fi adventure film Elio, but left the project in August 2024 due to scheduling conflicts. In June 2025, one source at Pixar told The Hollywood Reporter that Ferrera left the film after Adrian Molina departed the film as director, and was replaced by Madeline Sharafian and Domee Shi, because she was "upset that there was no longer Latinx representation in the leadership" of the film.

== Activism ==
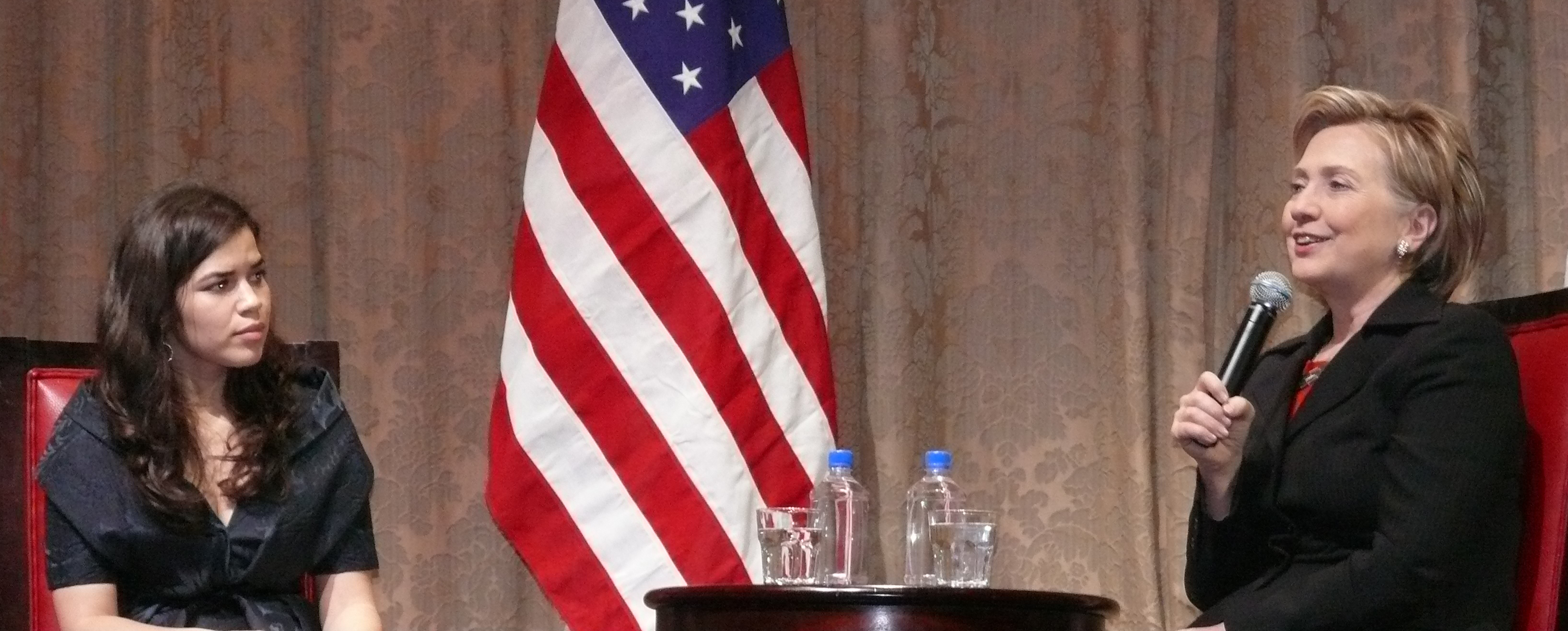
Ferrera with Hillary Clinton in 2008

During the 2008 presidential primaries, she, alongside Chelsea Clinton and Amber Tamblyn, led the Hillblazers organization in support of Hillary Clinton's campaign. Ferrera attended both the 2012 Democratic National Convention in Charlotte, North Carolina, and the 2016 Democratic National Convention in Philadelphia. At the 2016 convention, she addressed the delegates as a speaker, sharing the stage with Lena Dunham.

Ferrera has been active, through her involvement with the organization Voto Latino and by appearing on various news programs, in getting Latinos in the United States to vote. Ferrera also works with Eva Longoria to co-host She Se Puede, a digital lifestyle platform which encourages voting within the Latina community. As a continuation of their work prior to the 2020 presidential campaign, Ferrera and Longoria held a textbanking event with VoteRiders to educate voters about Georgia's strict Voter ID laws ahead of the Georgia Senate runoff.

Ferrera was the opening speaker for the Women's March on Washington on January 21, 2017. In October 2017, Ferrera began her participation in the #MeToo campaign, publicly revealing that she was sexually harassed when she was nine years old. She did not reveal any details about the harassment or the person who harassed her. In January 2018, Ferrera was a founding member of the Time's Up legal defense fund. Ferrera spoke at the Families Belong Together protest on June 30, 2018. In May 2024, Ferrera became IOM Global Goodwill Ambassador.

== Personal life and other ventures ==
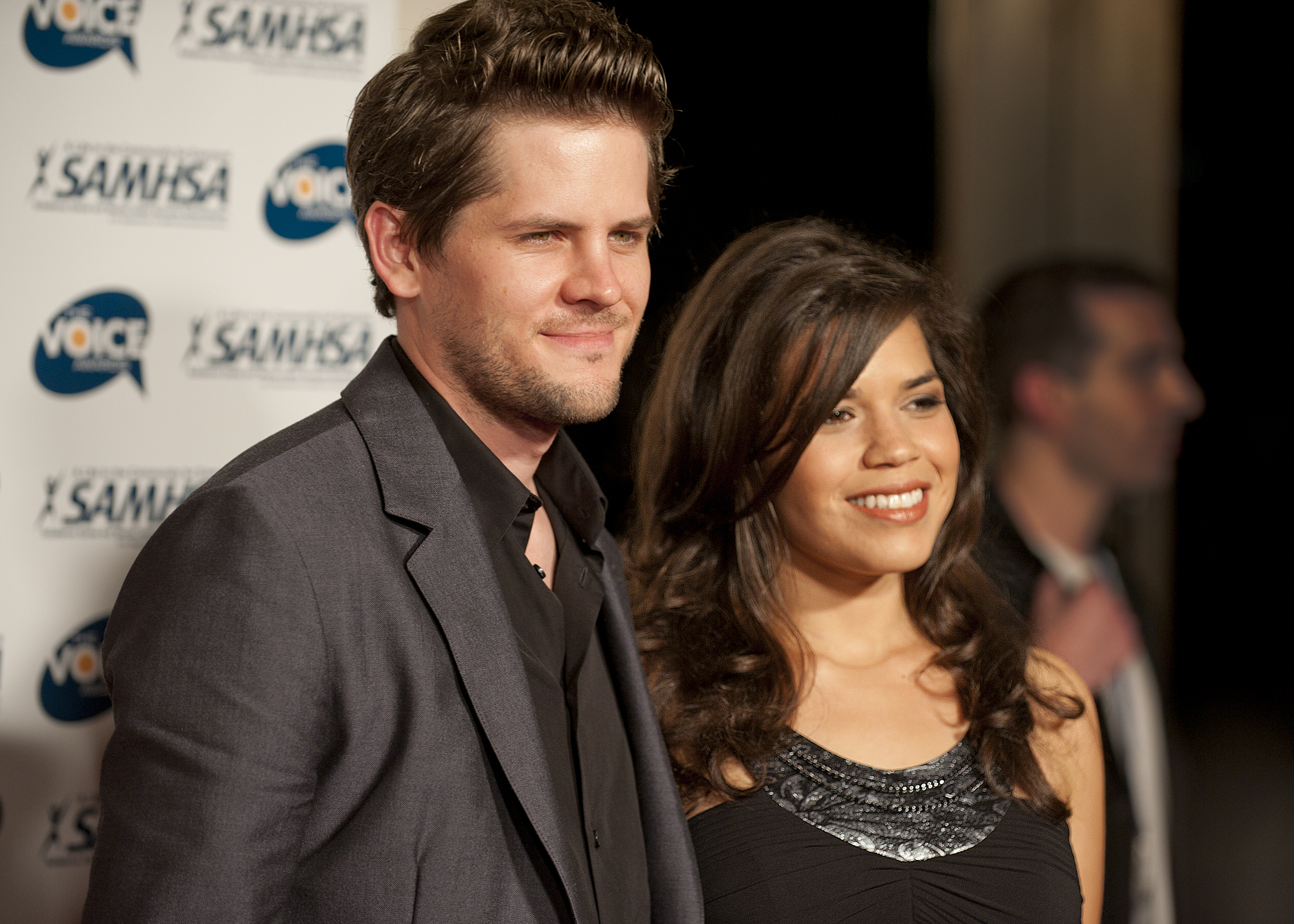
Ferrera with Ryan Piers Williams in October 2010

Ferrera first met actor, director, and writer Ryan Piers Williams when he cast her in a student film at USC in 2005, and both have acknowledged June 27 of that year as the date they became romantically involved. The couple got engaged in June 2010, and married on June 27, 2011, six years to the date of when they became a couple. On January 1, 2018, Ferrera and Williams revealed that they were expecting their first child. She announced on her Instagram page on May 29, 2018, that she had given birth that month to their first child, a boy. On May 4, 2020, Ferrera gave birth to a girl.

Ferrera was a guest narrator at Disney's Candlelight Processional at Walt Disney World in 2015. In 2018, her edited anthology of stories, American Like Me: Reflections on Life Between Cultures, was published by Gallery Publishing Group. In April 2019, Ferrera gave a TEDTalk entitled "My Identity is a Superpower". In July 2020, Ferrera was announced as an investor in a primarily female group that was awarded a Los Angeles-based franchise in the National Women's Soccer League. The new team, since unveiled as Angel City FC, started playing in 2022.

== Filmography ==
Key
| † | Denotes works that have not yet been released |

=== Film ===
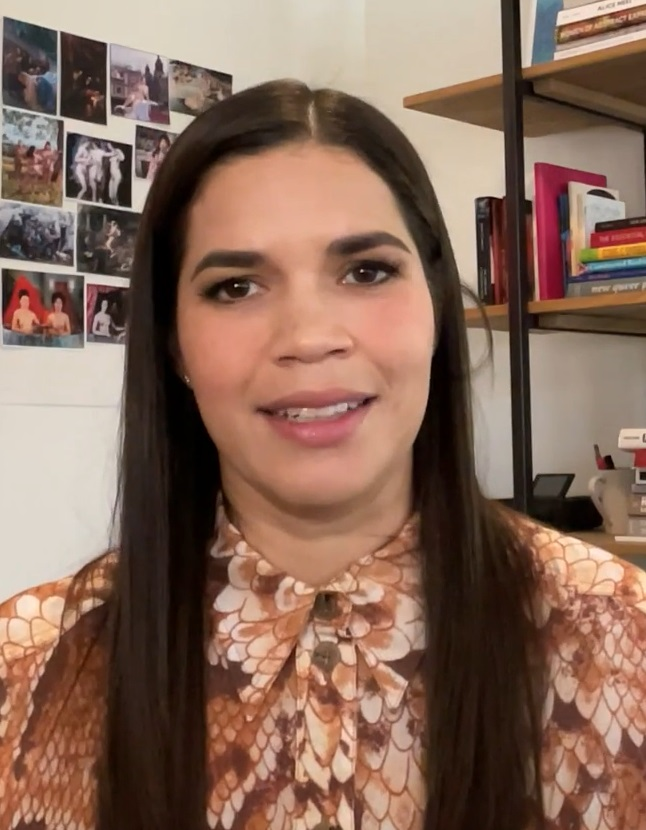
America Ferrera in 2021

| Year | Title | Role | Notes |
|---|---|---|---|
| 2002 | Real Women Have Curves | Ana García | |
| 2004 | Darkness Minus Twelve | Luiza | Short film |
| 2005 | How the Garcia Girls Spent Their Summer | Blanca Garcia | |
| 2005 | The Sisterhood of the Traveling Pants | Carmen Lowell | |
| 2005 | Lords of Dogtown | Thunder Monkey | |
| 2005 | 3:52 | Kate | |
| 2006 | Steel City | Amy Barnes | |
| 2007 | Muertas | Rebecca | Short film; also executive producer |
| 2007 | Towards Darkness (Hacia la oscuridad) | Luiza | Also executive producer |
| 2007 | Under the Same Moon | Martha | |
| 2008 | The Sisterhood of the Traveling Pants 2 | Carmen Lowell | |
| 2008 | Tinker Bell | Fawn | Direct-to-video; voice role |
| 2010 | The Dry Land | Sarah | Also executive producer |
| 2010 | Our Family Wedding | Lucia Ramirez | |
| 2010 | How to Train Your Dragon | Astrid Hofferson | Voice role |
| 2010 | Legend of the Boneknapper Dragon | Astrid Hofferson | Short film; voice role |
| 2011 | Book of Dragons | Astrid Hofferson | Short film; voice role |
| 2011 | Gift of the Night Fury | Astrid Hofferson | Short film; voice role |
| 2012 | It's a Disaster | Hedy Galili | |
| 2012 | End of Watch | Officer Orozco | |
| 2012 | Half the Sky | Herself | Documentary film |
| 2013 | Sid the Science Kid: The Movie | Dr. Cordova | Voice role |
| 2014 | Cesar Chavez | Helen Chávez | |
| 2014 | X/Y | Silvia | Also producer |
| 2014 | How to Train Your Dragon 2 | Astrid Hofferson | Voice role |
| 2014 | Dawn of the Dragon Racers | Astrid Hofferson | Short film; voice role |
| 2016 | Special Correspondents | Brigida | |
| 2019 | How to Train Your Dragon: The Hidden World | Astrid Hofferson | Voice role |
| 2019 | How to Train Your Dragon: Homecoming | Astrid Hofferson | Short film; voice role |
| 2023 | Barbie | Gloria | |
| 2023 | Dumb Money | Jennifer Campbell | |
| 2025 | Arco | Arco's mother | Voice role; English dub |
| 2025 | The Lost Bus | Mary Ludwig | |
| 2026 | The Cat in the Hat | Carmen | Voice role |

=== Television ===
| Year | Title | Role | Notes |
|---|---|---|---|
| 2002–2008, 2010–2011 | Independent Lens | Herself / Host | Seasons 5–9, 12–13; 112 episodes |
| 2002 | Touched by an Angel | Charlee | Episode: "The Word" |
| 2002 | Gotta Kick It Up! | Yolanda "Yoli" Vargas | Disney Channel Original Movie |
| 2004 | Plainsong | Victoria Roubideaux | Hallmark Hall of Fame movie |
| 2004 | CSI: Crime Scene Investigation | April Perez | Episode: "Harvest" |
| 2006–2010 | Ugly Betty | Betty Suarez | Lead role; 85 episodes |
| 2011 | Handy Manny | Graciela Morales | Episode: "Snow Problem"; voice |
| 2011–2013 | The Good Wife | Natalie Flores | 4 episodes |
| 2012–2018 | DreamWorks Dragons | Astrid Hofferson | Main cast; voice |
| 2014 | Years of Living Dangerously | Herself | Episode: "Winds of Change" |
| 2015 | Last Week Tonight with John Oliver | Maternity | Episode: "Paid Family Leave" |
| 2015 | Inside Amy Schumer | Mena | Episode: "80s Ladies" |
| 2015–2021 | Superstore | Amelia "Amy" Sosa | Main cast, 103 episodes; also co-producer and director of four episodes |
| 2016 | Lip Sync Battle | Herself | Episode: "America Ferrera vs. Amber Tamblyn" |
| 2017 | Curb Your Enthusiasm | Vanessa Nadal | Episode: "The Shucker" |
| 2020 | Gentefied | Andy Cruz | Episode: "The Mural"; also executive producer and director |
| 2022 | WeCrashed | Elishia Kennedy | 2 episodes |
| 2024 | What If...? | Ranger Morales | Episode: "What If... the Red Guardian Stopped the Winter Soldier?"; voice |
| 2026 | Finding Your Roots | Herself | Episode: America Ferrera and Darren Criss |
| TBA | Army of Shadows † | | Upcoming series |

=== Web ===
| Year | Title | Role | Notes |
|---|---|---|---|
| 2012 | Christine | Christine | Main cast; 12 episodes |
| 2015 | What's Your Emergency | Brenda Fitzgerald | 2 episodes |
| 2017 | Gente-fied | | Executive producer |

== Music video ==
| Title | Year | Performer(s) | Director | Album | Ref. |
|---|---|---|---|---|---|
| "Family Feud" | 2017 | Jay-Z (featuring Beyoncé) | Ava DuVernay | 4:44 | |

== See also ==
- List of actors with Academy Award nominations
- List of Hispanic Academy Award winners and nominees

== Bibliography ==
- "America Ferrera 1984–". Biography Today. 16 (3). Omnigraphics, Inc.: 78 2007. ISBN 9780780809741.
