= Baiana =

Baiana is the feminine form of baiano, the demonym for individuals from the state of Bahia, Brazil.

It may also refer to:

- Baiana do acarajé, Afro-Brazilian food vendors

== See also ==
- Baianá
- Baiano
