= Marié River =

Location
- Country: Brazil

Physical characteristics
- Source
  - location: Amazonas state
  - coordinates: 0°42′15.8328″S 69°22′16.7664″W
  - elevation: 148 m (486 ft)
- Mouth: Rio Negro
  - coordinates: 0°25′30.6516″S 66°23′45.8232″W
  - elevation: 45 m (148 ft)
- Length: 800 km (500 mi)
- Basin size: 25,378 km^{2} (9,799 sq mi)
- Discharge
  - location: Confluence of Rio Negro, Amazonas
  - average: 1,186 m^{3}/s (41,900 cu ft/s)

Basin features
- Tributaries
  - left: Igarapé Turi, Lá
  - right: Igarapé Trabalho, Rio da Costa, Igarapé Paranã, Igarapé Mauá, Igarapé Uneí, Igarapé Macoura

Marié River (Portuguese: Rio Marié) is a river of Amazonas state in north-western Brazil. It is a tributary of the Rio Negro. Acarabu Island is located at this confluence.

== See also ==
- List of rivers of Amazonas

== Sources ==
- Brazilian Ministry of Transport
