= Baiano =

Baiano may refer to:

- Baiano, Campania, a comune in the Province of Avellino, Italy
- Demonym of Bahia state, Brazil
- Baiano Portuguese
- Campeonato Baiano, a Brazilian football league

== People ==
=== Arts and entertainment ===
- Novos Baianos, Brazilian rock band in the 1960s and 70s
- Enrico Baiano (born 1960), Italian harpsichordist
- Lucas Baiano (born 1988), Canadian filmmaker

=== Sports ===
==== Football ====
- Baiano (footballer, born 1939) (1939–2019), born Carmo David, Brazilian forward
- Baiano (footballer, born 1969), born Rogério Martins da Silva, Brazilian midfielder
- Baiano (footballer, born 1978), born Dermival Almeida Lima, Brazilian right-back
- Baiano (footballer, born 1981), born Erison Da Silva Santos Carnietto, Brazilian midfielder
- Baiano (footballer, born 1987), born Wanderson Souza Carneiro, Brazilian right-back
- Baiano (footballer, born 1992), born Fabrício Santos de Jesus, Brazilian defensive midfielder
- Chiquinho Baiano (born 1980), born Francisco Andrade Gomes Junior, Brazilian left-back
- Dija Baiano (born 1990), born Djavan de Lima Araujo, Brazilian forward
- Éder Baiano (born 1984), born Eder Luís de Carvalho, Brazilian defender
- Edinho Baiano (born 1967), born Édson Manoel do Nascimento, Brazilian defender
- Fábio Baiano (born 1975), born Fábio da Silva Morais, Brazilian attacking midfielder
- Fernando Baiano (born 1979), born João Fernando Nelo, Brazilian striker
- Francesco Baiano (born 1968), Italian footballer
- Gil Baiano (born 1966), born José Gildásio Pereira de Matos, Brazilian rightback
- Jefferson Baiano (born 1995), born Jefferson Silva dos Santos, Brazilian forward
- Júnior Baiano (born 1970), born Raimundo Ferreira Ramos Jr., Brazilian centre-back
- Neto Baiano (born 1982), born Euvaldo José de Aguiar Neto, Brazilian forward
- Rafael Baiano (born 1983), born Rafael Alexandrino dos Santos, Brazilian forward
- Ricardo Baiano (born 1980), born Ricardo Santos Lago, Bosnian midfielder
- Serginho Baiano (born 1978), born Elisérgio da Silva, Brazilian winger
- Val Baiano (born 1981), born Osvaldo Félix Souza, Brazilian forward

==== Basketball ====
- Baiano (basketball) (1912–1956), born Aluízio Freire Ramos Accioly Neto, Brazilian basketball player
