= Baianá =

Baianá may refer to:

- "Baianá", a 2005 song by Brazilian body percussion group Barbatuques, from the album O seguinte é esse, based on the traditional song "Mestra Terezinha"
- "Baianá", a 2019 song by Dutch DJ and producer Bakermat which samples the Barbatuques song
- "Baianá", a 2022 song by Danish rapper Gilli which samples the Barbatuques song
- "Baianá", a 2022 song by English producer and DJ Nia Archives which samples the Barbatuques recording

== See also ==
- Baiana (disambiguation)
