= List of awards and nominations received by America Ferrera =

America Ferrera awards and nominations
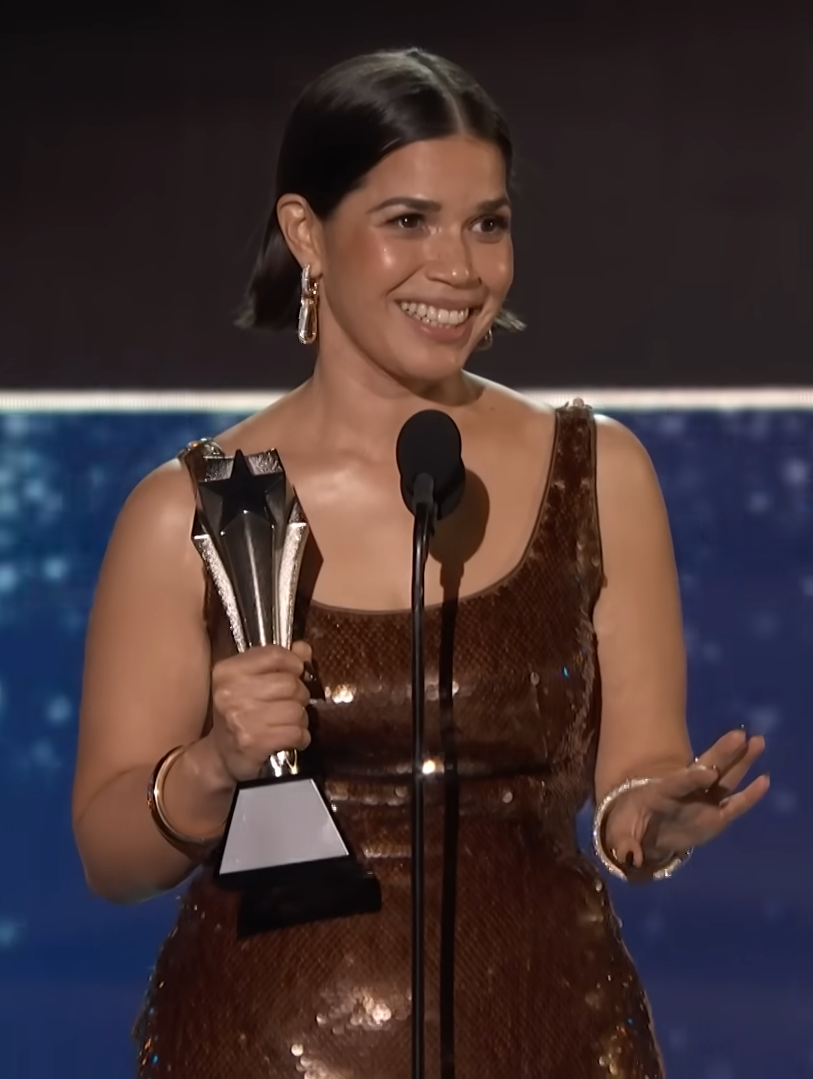
- Ferrera at the 29th Critics' Choice Awards
Awards and nominations
Award	Wins	Nominations
Academy Awards	0	1
Golden Globe Awards	1	3
Primetime Emmy Awards	1	2
Screen Actors Guild Awards	1	6

Totals (Note: Certain award groups do not simply award one winner. They acknowledge several different recipients, have runners-up, and have third place. Since this is a specific recognition and is different from losing an award, runner-up mentions are considered wins in this award tally. For simplification and to avoid errors, each award in this list has been presumed to have had a prior nomination.)
- Wins: 25
- Nominations: 80

This is a list of awards and nominations received by American actress and director America Ferrera.

Active in the cinematographic field since the 2000s, Ferrera starter her career acting in supporting roles in several films and televisions series, receiving a nominations at the Independent Spirit Awards for her role in Real Women Have Curves and being recognized for her performance as Carmen Lowell in The Sisterhood of the Traveling Pants with the ALMA Award for Outstanding Supporting Actress. From 2006 to 2010 Ferrera starred as Betty Suarez on ABC series Ugly Betty receiving positive receptions by critics, winning a Golden Globe Award, a Primetime Emmy Award, a Screen Actors Guild Award and a Satellite Award. Between 2010 and 2019 she voiced on DreamWorks Animation film trilogy How to Train Your Dragon, winning a Voice Arts Award.

In 2014 she acted on biographical film Cesar Chavez, being recognized with the ALMA Award for Special Achievement in Film. Between 2015 and 2021 she starred, co-produced and directed four episodes of television series Superstore, winning a Gracie Awards. In 2023 Ferrera starred as Gloria on critical acclaim film Barbie, being nominated at the Academy Award for Best Supporting Actress. She also won a People's Choice Award and received two nominations at the Critics' Choice Movie Awards for her acting performance.

Ferrera was also recognized with several non-competitive honors. The American-Canadian Critics Choice Association honored the actress with the #SeeHer Award and the Groundbreaker Award at the Celebration of Cinema and Television. The National Hispanic Media Coalition awarded her with the Outstanding Series Producer Award wihile the Santa Barbara International Film Festival honored her works with the Virtuoso Award. The Latino Entertainment Journalists Association gave Ferrera the Latino Activism Award for her support through her works to the Latino community.

== Major associations ==
=== Academy Awards ===
Year	Category	Work	Result	Ref.
2024	Best Supporting Actress	Barbie	Nominated	

=== Golden Globe Awards ===
Year	Category	Work	Result	Ref.
2007	Best Actress in a Television Series – Musical or Comedy	Ugly Betty	Won	
2008	Best Actress in a Television Series – Musical or Comedy	Ugly Betty	Nominated	
2009	Best Actress in a Television Series – Musical or Comedy	Ugly Betty	Nominated	

=== Primetime Emmy Awards ===
Year	Category	Work	Result	Ref.
2007	Outstanding Lead Actress in a Comedy Series	Ugly Betty	Won	
2008	Outstanding Lead Actress in a Comedy Series	Ugly Betty	Nominated	

=== Screen Actors Guild Awards ===
Year	Category	Work	Result	Ref.
2007	Outstanding Performance by a Female Actor in a Comedy Series	Ugly Betty	Won	
2007	Outstanding Performance by an Ensemble in a Comedy Series (shared with cast)	Ugly Betty	Nominated	
2008	Outstanding Performance by a Female Actor in a Comedy Series	Ugly Betty	Nominated	
2008	Outstanding Performance by an Ensemble in a Comedy Series	Ugly Betty	Nominated	
2009	Outstanding Performance by a Female Actor in a Comedy Series	Ugly Betty	Nominated	
2024	Outstanding Performance by a Cast in a Motion Picture	Barbie	Nominated	

== Other awards and nominations ==
=== ALMA Award ===
Year	Category	Work	Result	Ref.
2007	Outstanding Supporting Actress in a Motion Picture	The Sisterhood of the Traveling Pants	Won	
2008	Outstanding Actress in Television – Comedy	Ugly Betty	Nominated	
2009	Outstanding Actress in Television – Comedy	Ugly Betty	Nominated	
2014	Special Achievement in Film	Cesar Chavez	Won	

=== Critics' Choice Movie Awards ===
Year	Category	Work	Result	Ref.
2024	#SeeHer Award	Herself	Won	
2024	Best Supporting Actress	Barbie	Nominated	
2024	Best Acting Ensemble	Barbie	Nominated	

=== Independent Spirit Awards ===
Year	Category	Work	Result	Ref.
2002	Best Breakthrough Performance	Real Women Have Curves	Nominated	

=== Imagen Awards ===
Year	Category	Work	Result	Ref.
2006	Best Actress – Television	Ugly Betty	Won	
2007	Creative Achievement Award	Herself	Won	
2007	Best Actress – Television	Ugly Betty	Won	
2008	Best Actress – Television	Ugly Betty	Nominated	
2009	Best Actress – Television	Ugly Betty	Nominated	
2010	Best Actress – Television	Ugly Betty	Won	
2010	Best Actress – Film	The Dry Land	Nominated	
2010	Best Actress – Film	Our Family Wedding	Nominated	
2014	Best Actress – Feature Film	Cesar Chavez	Nominated	
2016	Best Actress – Television	Superstore	Nominated	
2018	Best Actress – Television	Superstore	Nominated	
2019	Best Actress – Television	Superstore	Nominated	
2021	Best Actress – Television	Superstore	Nominated	
2022	Best Director – Television	Gentefied	Nominated	
2024	Best Supporting Actress – Film	Barbie	Won	

=== NAACP Image Award ===
Year	Category	Work	Result	Ref.
2007	Outstanding Actress in a Comedy Series	Ugly Betty	Nominated	
2008	Outstanding Actress in a Comedy Series	Ugly Betty	Won	
2009	Outstanding Actress in a Comedy Series	Ugly Betty	Nominated	
2010	Outstanding Actress in a Comedy Series	Ugly Betty	Nominated	

=== Nickelodeon Kids' Choice Awards ===
Year	Category	Work	Result	Ref.
2009	Favorite Television Actress	Ugly Betty	Nominated	
2024	Favorite Movie Actress	Barbie	Nominated	

=== People's Choice Awards ===
Year	Category	Work	Result	Ref.
2019	The Animated Movie Star of the Year	How to Train Your Dragon: The Hidden World	Nominated	
2024	The Movie Performance of the Year	Barbie	Won	

=== Satellite Awards ===
Year	Category	Work	Result	Ref.
2005	Best Actress – Television Series Musical or Comedy	Ugly Betty	Nominated	
2006	Best Actress – Television Series Musical or Comedy	Ugly Betty	Nominated	
2007	Best Actress – Television Series Musical or Comedy	Ugly Betty	Won	
2008	Best Actress – Television Series Musical or Comedy	Ugly Betty	Nominated	
2024	Best Supporting Actress – Motion Picture	Barbie	Nominated	

=== Teen Choice Awards ===
Year	Category	Work	Result	Ref.
2005	Choice Movie Breakout Performance – Female	The Sisterhood of the Traveling Pants	Nominated	
2005	Choice Movie Hissy Fit	The Sisterhood of the Traveling Pants	Nominated	
2007	Choice TV: Breakout	Ugly Betty	Won	
2007	Choice TV Actress: Comedy	Ugly Betty	Nominated	
2008	Choice TV Actress: Comedy	Ugly Betty	Nominated	
2009	Choice TV Actress: Comedy	Ugly Betty	Nominated	
2018	Choice TV Actress: Comedy	Superstore	Nominated	

=== Voice Arts Awards ===
Year	Category	Work	Result	Ref.
2019	Outstanding Animation Cast – Motion Picture – Best Voiceover	How to Train Your Dragon: The Hidden World	Won	

=== Young Artist Award ===
Year	Category	Work	Result	Ref.
2003	Best Performance in a Feature Film – Leading Young Actress	Real Women Have Curves	Nominated	

== Critics awards ==
Association	Year	Work	Category	Result	Ref.
Alliance of Women Film Journalists	2011	How to Train Your Dragon	Best Actress-Animated Female Film	Won	
Alliance of Women Film Journalists	2024	Barbie	Best Actress in a Supporting Role	Nominated	
Astra Film and Creative Awards	2024	Barbie	Best Supporting Actress	Nominated	
Astra Film and Creative Awards	2024	Barbie	Best Cast Ensemble	Nominated	
Austin Film Critics Association	2024	Barbie	Best Ensemble	Nominated	
Celebration of Cinema and Television	2023	Herself	Groundbreaker Award	Won	
Florida Film Critics Circle	2023	Barbie	Best Ensemble	Nominated	
Georgia Film Critics Association Awards	2024	Barbie	Best Ensemble	Nominated	
Golden Nymph Awards	2017	Superstore	Best Actress – Comedy	Nominated	
Gracie Awards	2017	Superstore	Actress in a Leading Role – Comedy or Musical	Won	
Houston Film Critics Society	2023	Barbie	Best Ensemble	Nominated	
Latino Entertainment Journalists Association	2019	Herself	Latino Activism Award	Won	
Latino Entertainment Journalists Association	2024	Barbie	Best Supporting Actress	Nominated	
Latino Entertainment Journalists Association	2024	Barbie	Best Ensemble Cast	Nominated	
National Hispanic Media Coalition	2020	Herself	Outstanding Series Producer Award	Won	
New York Women in Film & Television	2009	Herself	Muse Award	Won	
San Diego Film Critics Society	2023	Barbie	Best Performance by an Ensemble	Nominated	
Santa Barbara International Film Festival	2024	Herself	Virtuoso Award	Won	
Seattle Film Critics Society Awards	2023	Barbie	Best Ensemble Cast	Nominated	
St. Louis Film Critics Association	2023	Barbie	Best Ensemble	Runner-up	
Sundance Film Festival	2002	Real Women Have Curves	Special Jury Prize: Dramatic	Won	
TCA Awards	2007	Ugly Betty	Individual Achievement in Comedy	Nominated	
Washington D.C. Area Film Critics Association Awards	2023	Barbie	Best Acting Ensemble	Nominated	
