= Ricardo Ben-Oliel =

Israeli academic (born 1944)

- ריקרדו בן-אוליאל
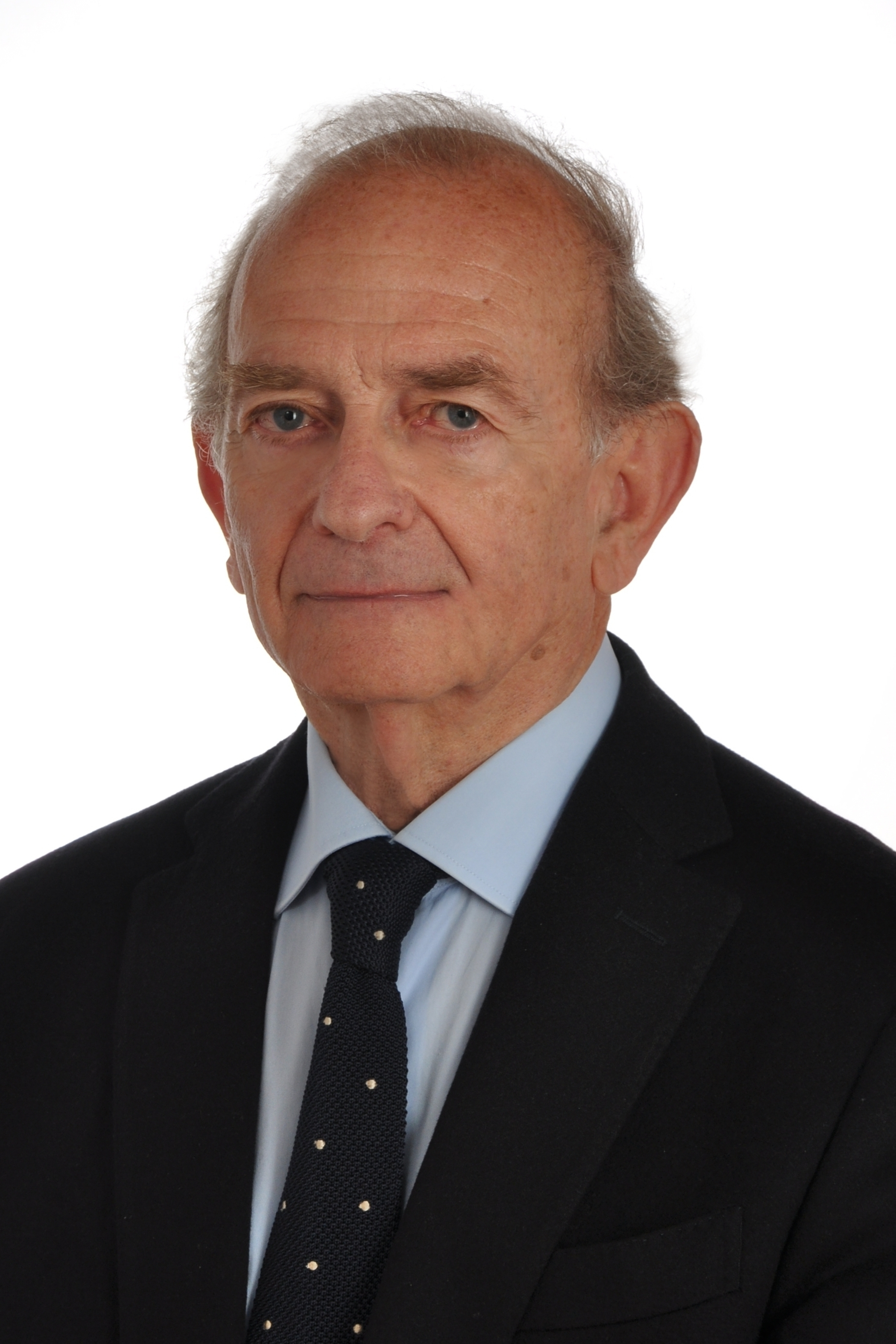
- Born: 1944 (age 81–82)
- Education: Doctor of Law, Hebrew University in Jerusalem
- Occupation: Professor of law
- Organization: University of Haifa
- Spouse: Marta
- Children: 2

Ricardo Ben-Oliel (Hebrew: ריקרדו בן-אוליאל) is a Full Professor of law (emeritus) at the University of Haifa Faculty of Law.

He was born in 1944 in Portugal, in the former colony Cape Verde, where his German descent mother found refuge during the Nazi period. He is a descendant of the rabbinical, aristocratic family Ben-Atar from his father's side.

Ben-Oliel is a Classic University of Lisbon Faculty of Law (1966) graduate. He worked as a public prosecutor and later as a private lawyer during his first professional years.

In December 1973, he emigrated to Israel. After presenting his doctoral thesis on banking law in 1977, Prof. Ben-Oliel was invited to teach in Jerusalem's Hebrew University Faculty of Law.

As a lecturer and a senior research fellow of the Harry and Michael Sacher Institute for Legislative Research and Comparative Law in the same school, he became a pioneer in the research and teaching of banking law in Israel. He is the author of five legal books and dozens of articles published in Europe, the United States, Canada, and Israel, including one seminal treatise on Banking Law cited by hundreds of court decisions, including many Israeli Supreme Court ones.

In the preface of his treatise by the former Chief Justice of the Supreme Court in Israel, Professor Aharon Barak, he refers to him as "the leading authority of banking law in Israel."

During his career he taught various courses and seminars on banking law, bills and other means of payment, comparative law, private law, the law of obligations, the law of agency and its developments.

Ben-Oliel was a member of the committee that prepared a project for an Israeli Civil Code and a member of the founding team of the Faculty of Law at the University of Haifa.

He is also the author of three short story fiction books related to Jewish topics: Silence (Silêncio, in Portuguese) (2013), The Locked Room where not even Death Entered and other Stories on Lisbon and Jerusalem (O quarto trancado onde nem a morte entrava e outros contos de Lisboa e de Jerusalém, in Portuguese) (2015). His third short story fiction book is A Stain called Berlin (Uma Mancha chamada Berlim, in Portuguese ) (2018). In 2021 Ben-Oliel published a fourth fiction book, a novel, called Jerusalem - the Cry! (Jerusalém- o Grito!, in Portuguese).

Ricardo is married to Marta, the father of Daniel Benoliel and Uri Benoliel, both law professors, and has five grandchildren.
