= Meeting of Waters =

Natural phenomonen of the Rio Negro and Solimões River

Coordinates: 3°8′12″S 59°54′17″W

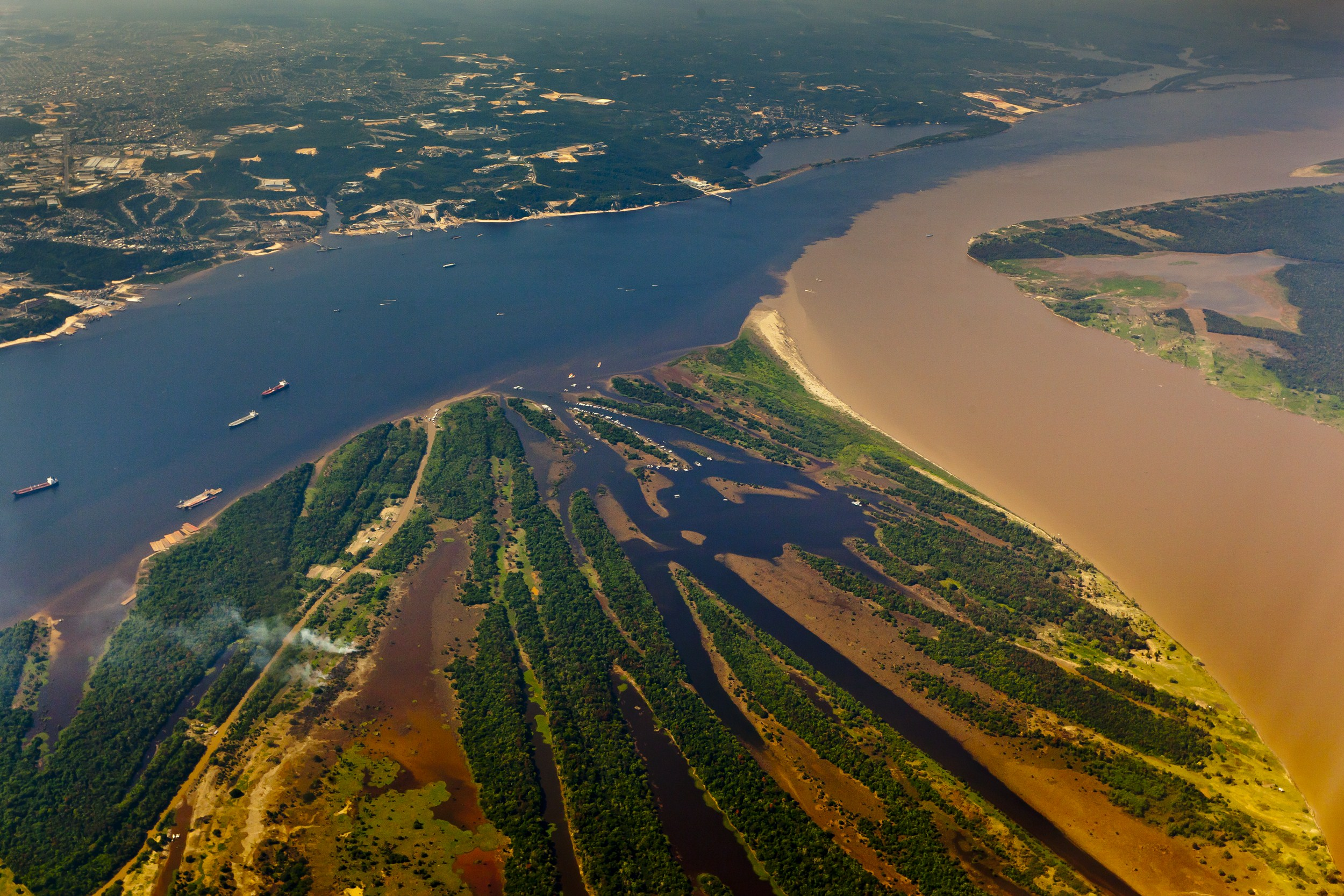
Aerial view of the Meeting of Waters.

The Meeting of Waters (Portuguese: Encontro das Águas) is the confluence between the dark (blackwater) Rio Negro and the pale sandy-colored (whitewater) Amazon River, referred to as the Solimões River in Brazil, upriver of this confluence. For 6 km (3.7 mi) the waters of the two rivers run side by side without mixing. This phenomenon is one of the main tourist attractions of Manaus. The river then flows another 60 km (37 mi) before mixing fully, but the phenomenon persists incompletely for another 30 km (19 mi).

This phenomenon is due to the vast differences in temperature, speed, and amount of dissolved sediments in the waters of the two rivers. The Rio Negro flows at near 2 km/h (1.2 mph) at a temperature of 28 °C (82 °F), while the Rio Solimões flows between 4 and 6 km/h (2.5–3.7 mph) at a temperature of 22 °C (72 °F). The light-colored water is rich with sediment from the Andes Mountains, whereas the black water, running from the Colombian hills and interior jungles, is nearly sediment-free and colored by decayed leaf and plant matter.

Smaller-scale meeting of waters of the Amazon river also occurs in the locations of Santarém (Brazil), Iquitos (Peru), Puerto Maldonado (Peru) and Coari (Brazil).
