= Tim Pawlenty 2012 presidential campaign =

American political campaign

Tim Pawlenty for President 2012
- Campaign: U.S. presidential election, 2012
- Candidate: Tim Pawlenty; 39th Governor of Minnesota (2003–2011)
- Affiliation: Republican Party
- Status: Withdrew, August 14, 2011
- Headquarters: St. Paul, Minnesota
- Key people: Nick Ayers (campaign manager)
- Receipts: US$5,965,502 (2012-3-31)

Website
- Pawlenty 2012 (archived - August 8, 2011)

The 2012 presidential campaign of Tim Pawlenty, the 39th Governor of Minnesota began shortly after the 2010 midterm elections. He was seeking the 2012 Republican Party nomination for President of the United States.

On March 21, 2011, Pawlenty announced on Facebook that he had filed the organization of an exploratory committee with the Federal Election Commission. He formally declared his candidacy in Iowa on May 23, 2011. The day after finishing third place in the August 13, 2011 Ames Straw Poll, Pawlenty ended his presidential campaign.

== Background ==
In February 2005, ABC News identified him as a potential candidate for president. Pawlenty decided not to seek a third term as governor, and so was not a candidate in the November 2010 gubernatorial election. Later, he regretted the decision, which was made in part due to wanting to avoid having to fight with the Democratic-controlled legislature, because Democrats lost control of the legislature in the same election.

In September 2008, MinnPost mentioned that Pawlenty was a potential candidate in the 2012 presidential election. In October 2009, a CNN article suggested that Pawlenty was contemplating a 2012 White House bid. Among those advising him in preparation for a potential presidential run was lobbyist and former Congressman Vin Weber.

In late 2009, Pawlenty began taking steps that many saw as leading to a 2012 presidential bid. He visited Iowa in November 2009 and April 2010, making political speeches. In January 2011, The New York Times reported that "Few Americans, in fact, even know his name." In January 2011, Pawlenty told the College Republicans group at The George Washington University "If I decide to run it would be for president, not vice president."

=== Staff ===
Sonny Perdue, a former governor of Georgia who was national campaign co-chairman for Newt Gingrich, defected to Pawlenty's campaign in June 2011, when at least 16 of Gingrich's staff quit. Elise Stefanik served as his policy director.

== Book tour and political positions ==
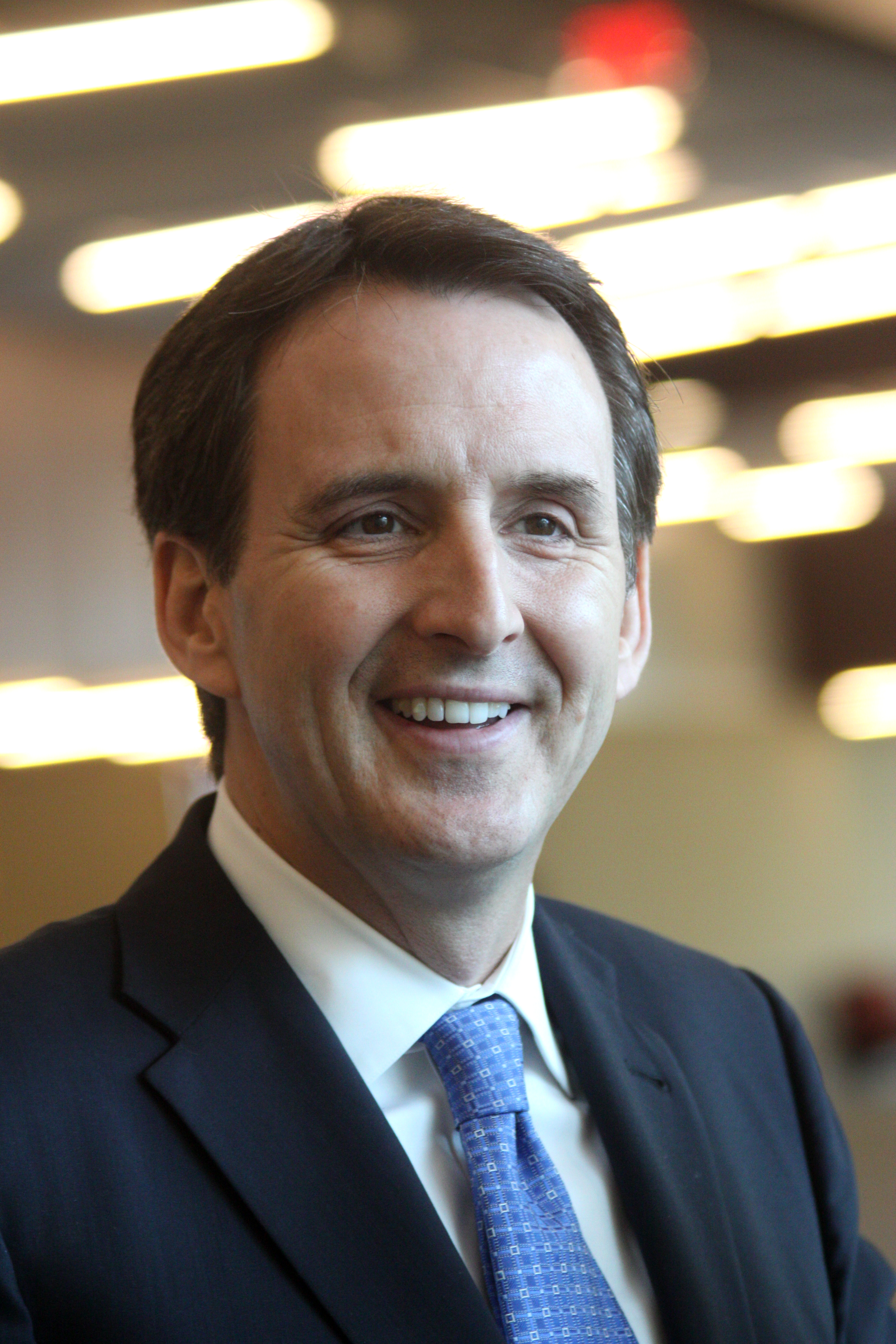
Pawlenty at a book signing in February 2011 in Phoenix, Arizona.

Pawlenty went on tour for his book Courage to Stand, and as of January 18, his book had reached #1,979 on Amazon.com's list of bestsellers. Pawlenty calls himself a social conservative. In his extended interview with Jon Stewart on The Daily Show, he said he thinks United States Social Security and Medicare need to be cut to balance the federal budget.

Pawlenty believes that state governments should outlaw abortion, except for cases of rape, incest, and to save a woman's life. He thinks the United States Supreme Court decided Roe v. Wade wrongly, abortion being a state, not a federal, matter. He opposes same-sex marriage and civil unions. He argued in favor of reinstating "Don't ask, don't tell" if he had become president. Answering a question from talk radio host Bryan Fischer, he replied, "... I have been a public supporter of maintaining Don't Ask, Don't Tell and I would support reinstating it as well".

In December 2010, Pawlenty was one of three U.S. governors who publicly declared solidarity with Christian right group Family Research Council.

Pawlenty's tour passed through Minneapolis, San Francisco and Dallas, ending in Iowa in January where the Iowa Caucuses are scheduled for February 6, 2012. "That will come up fast," he said, "if I do run."

In a December 2010 column in The Wall Street Journal, Pawlenty argued in favor of the historical benefits of "private sector" labor unions and strongly against "public sector" labor unions, whose collective bargaining rights he wanted to see curbed: "The rise of the labor movement in the early 20th century was a triumph for America's working class. In an era of deep economic anxiety, unions stood up for hard-working but vulnerable families, protecting them from physical and economic exploitation." He also criticized modern unions: "The moral case for unions—protecting working families from exploitation—does not apply to public employment... Unionized public employees are making more money, receiving more generous benefits, and enjoying greater job security than the working families forced to pay for it with ever-higher taxes, deficits and debt."

== Campaign developments ==
=== Announcement ===
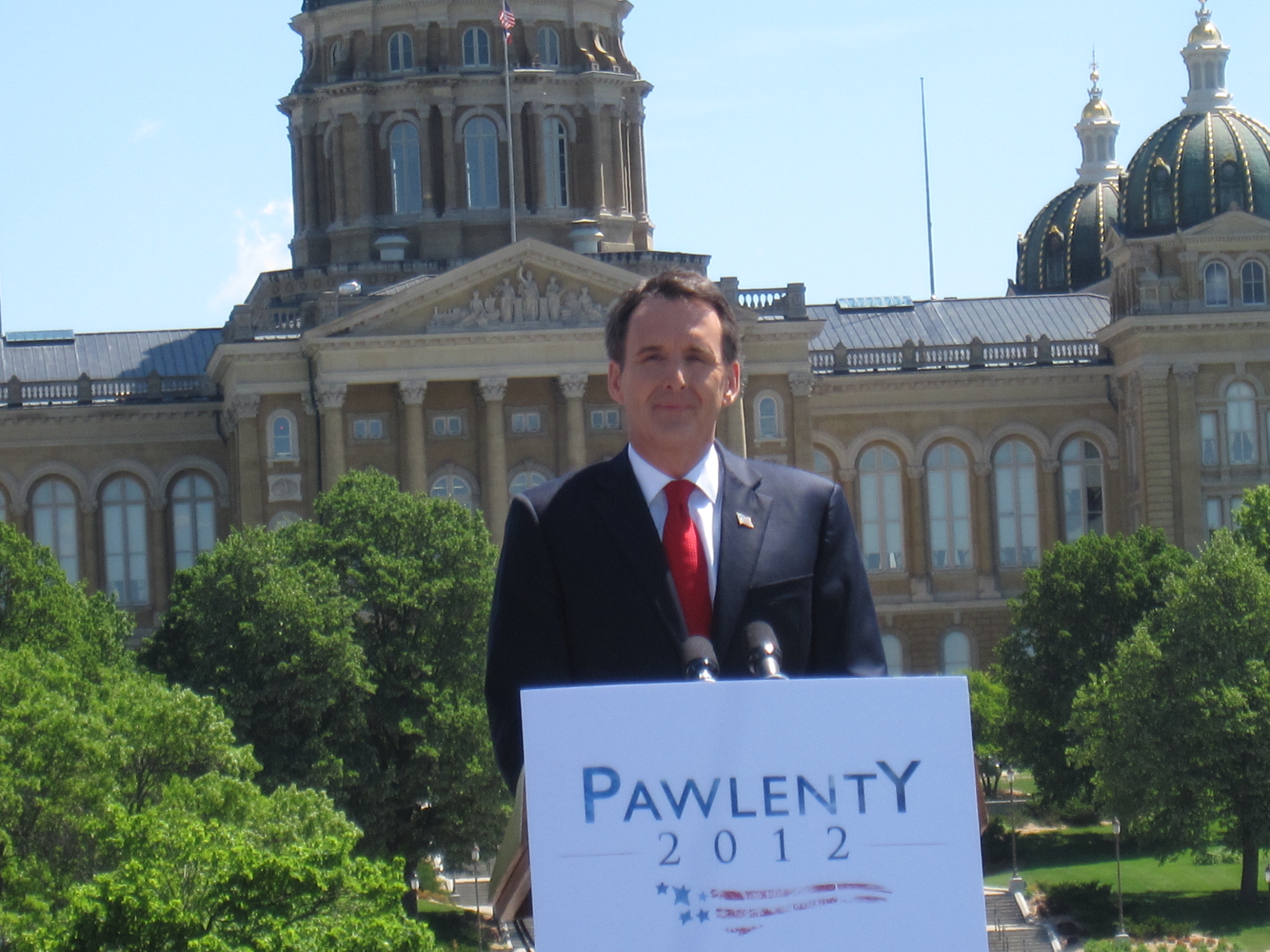
Pawlenty formally launched his official campaign on May 23 in Iowa

On March 21, 2011, Pawlenty announced, via Facebook, that he had formed an exploratory committee in preparation for a potential run for the 2012 Republican presidential nomination. On April 12, 2011, Pawlenty said clearly on CNN's Piers Morgan Tonight that he was "running for president" and not for vice president, adding that a formal announcement would be given in several weeks. On Twitter, his spokesman said CNN took his comments out of context.

On May 23, 2011, Pawlenty launched his candidacy for president in a speech in Iowa stating: "I'm going to try something a little unusual in politics. I'm just going to tell the truth." A YouTube video appeared a day before. The Wall Street Journal wrote of his candidacy, and the luck he experienced in the GOP's field, that Pawlenty has a "golden chance to become the chief rival to... Mitt Romney".

=== Rivalry with Michele Bachmann ===
Before fellow Minnesota politician Michele Bachmann entered the race in mid-2011, Pawlenty said, "I have a lot of respect for Michele Bachmann … Whether she runs or not, it's gonna be a big field. There's gonna be five, six, seven, eight people running … Whoever wants to run can run. The more, the merrier." In the weeks leading up to the Ames Straw Poll hosted by the Iowa GOP, however, Pawlenty expressed frustration with the perception that Representative Bachmann was the outsider in Minnesota politics and that he was the establishment. In a debate hosted by Fox News Channel and the Washington Examiner shortly before the poll Pawlenty challenged Bachmann, claiming that "in Congress, [Bachmann's] record of accomplishment and results is nonexistent."

Although Pawlenty had a top three result in the Ames poll on August 13 (after Bachmann and Ron Paul) and stated that "[w]e made progress in moving from the back of the pack into a competitive position for the caucuses", some analysts were of the view that with him receiving less than half of Bachmann's vote, Pawlenty had failed to reassure his prospective supporters and donors that his campaign was not stalled.

=== Withdrawal ===
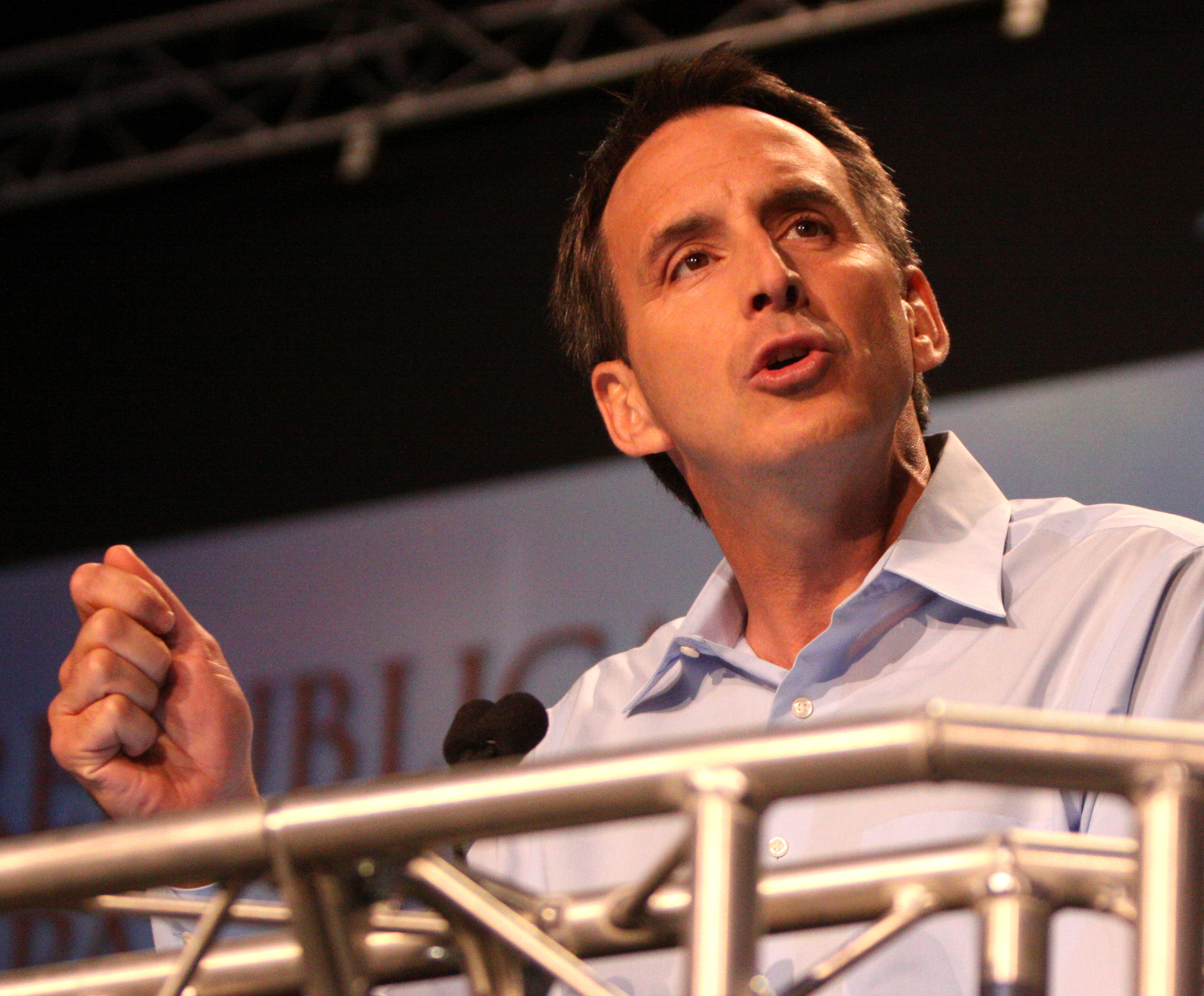
Pawlenty speaking at the Ames Straw Poll, the day before withdrawing from the race.

Following his poor showing in the Ames Straw Poll, where he received only 13.57% of the votes cast, behind second-place Ron Paul and winner Michele Bachmann, Pawlenty announced on ABC News's This Week he was ending his campaign for the Republican nomination:

It [his finish in the straw poll] was disappointing. But let me first say, Jake, this has been an incredible process. It's been a great honor for Mary and me and our team to convey the message of trying to get this country back on track -- and I think it is off-track -- but bringing my record forward as a two-term governor of a blue state, doing things like getting government spending under control, doing health care reform the right way, and much more. But obviously that message didn't get the kind of traction or lift that we needed and hoped for coming into and out of the Ames straw poll. We needed to get some lift to continue on and to have a pathway forward. That didn't happen. So I'm announcing this morning on your show that I'm going to be ending my campaign for president, but I'm very, very grateful for the people of Iowa, the people of this country, who I had a chance to make my case to, and for my supporters and staff and friends who've been so loyal and helpful. I really appreciate all of them. I wish it would have been different. But, obviously, the pathway forward for me doesn't really exist. And so we're going to end the campaign.

== Endorsements ==
List of Tim Pawlenty endorsements

Pawlenty had received endorsements from:

Senators and Congresspeople

- US Representative Joe Wilson of South Carolina

Former officeholders

- Former Georgia Governor Sonny Perdue

State legislators
Connecticut

- Connecticut State Republican Chairman Chris Healy

Celebrities

- Actress Jami Gertz
