= Lucas Baiano =

Canadian filmmaker

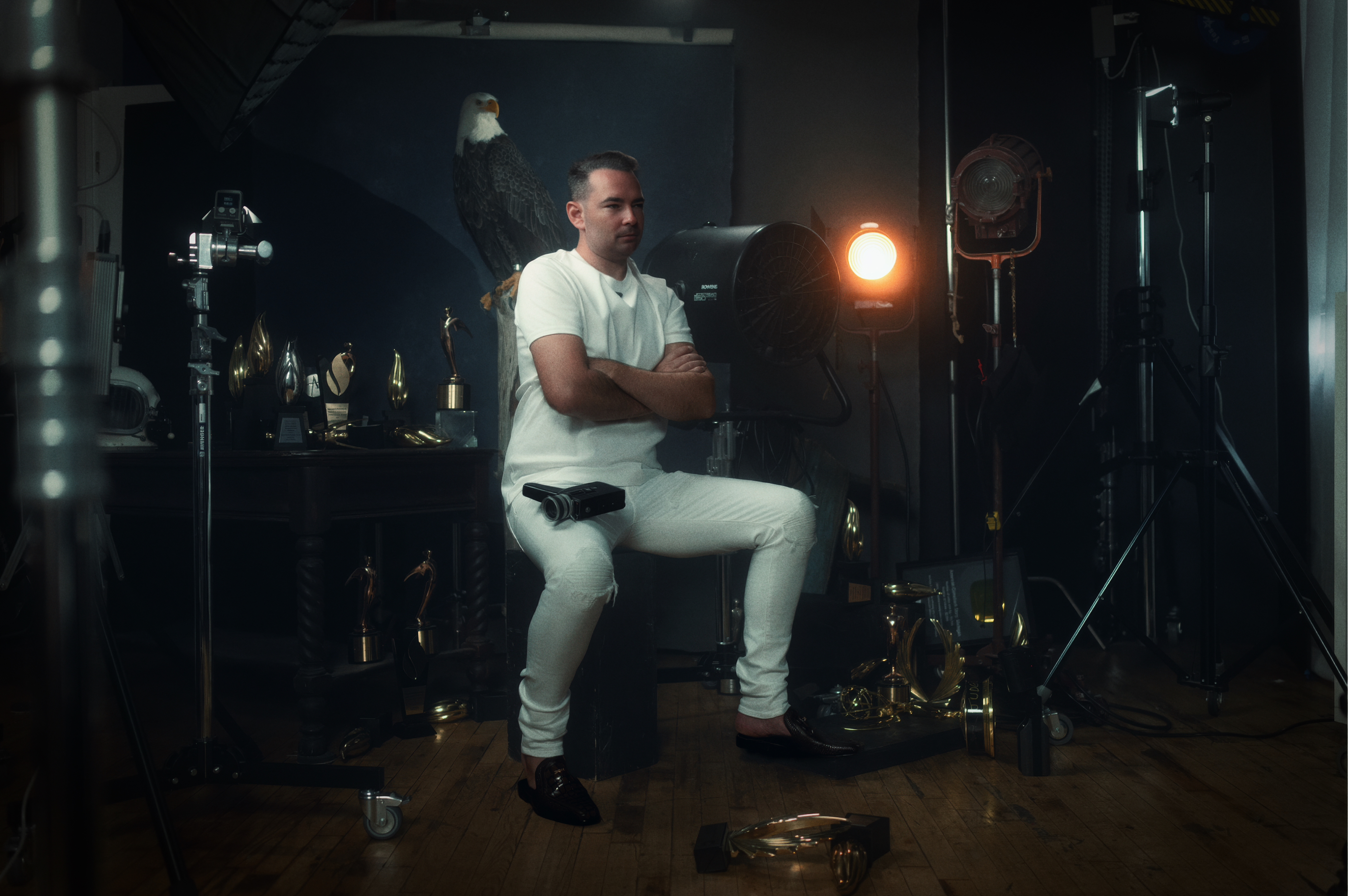
- Lucas Baiano
- Born: July 20, 1988 (age 37); Niagara Falls, Ontario, Canada
- Occupations: Political ads and film director
- Known for: Directing campaign ads for Hillary Clinton, John McCain, Tim Pawlenty, Rick Perry, Mitch McConnell
- Spouse: Katarina Baiano (2015)

Lucas R. Baiano (born July 20, 1988) is an Emmy Award Judging, Cannes Lions featured, American political and commercial filmmaker, referenced as “one of the most impressive millennial-generation ad-makers”. Baiano has directed for Hillary Clinton, John McCain, The Republican Governors Association Tim Pawlenty, Rick Perry, Chris Christie Mitch McConnell. Commercially including Google and BMW. Baiano has been featured in Time (magazine), Forbes, GQ, The Wall Street Journal, The New York Times, Vanity Fair (magazine) and cited in First Cameraman: Documenting the Obama Presidency in Real Time, written by Arun Chaudhary, Barack Obama's White House Cameraman and Collision 2012: Obama vs. Romney and the Future of Elections in America written by bestselling author Dan Balz.

== Early life ==
Born in Niagara Falls, Ontario, to an Italian-Canadian father and Irish-American mother, Baiano is a dual-citizen of Canada and the United States. His first recognized film was presented to the United Nations at the age of 16 as part of The Holocaust and United Nations Outreach Programme. Baiano would go on to form a film company in which he acquired corporate clients at the same age. Baiano attended Seneca College, Toronto, new media and broadcast studies, subsequently, he dropped out after a year-in-a-half to pursue political ad making.

== Career in Politics ==
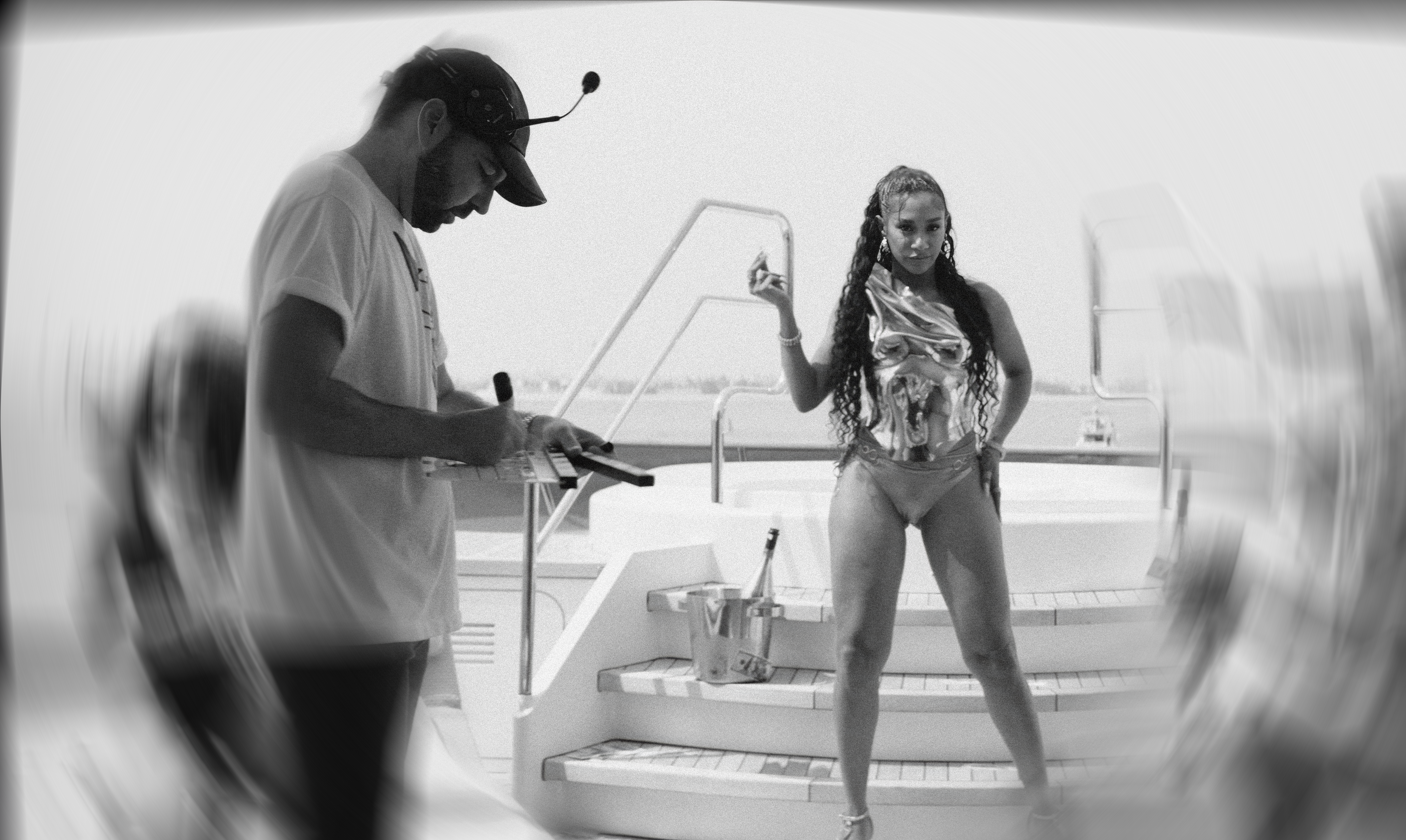

2008 presidential election

Baiano's debut into political media began with Hillary Clinton's 2008 presidential bid, sparked from a film pitch to former U.S. President Bill Clinton. In December 2007, after acquiring tickets to a meet and greet with former President Bill Clinton at a book lecture in Toronto, Baiano briefly met the former president and pitched him an idea to produce a theatrical campaign ad for his wife Hillary Clinton. President Clinton handed Baiano his business card and told him to get in touch. Baiano would go on to produce a three-minute video from the six hours of raw footage he was provided. Once conceded, Baiano switched parties and joined John McCain's presidential campaign. Following the 2008 election, Lucas would then go on to release a documentary film, Lucky Strike, which premiered at Politics of Film International Film Festival in 2010 highlighting his behind-the-scenes experiences with the Clinton campaign and the production of the ad.

2010 United States gubernatorial elections During the 2010 midterms, Baiano was employed by the Republican Governors Association as Director of Film, harnessing over 80 million views on his Facebook driven series “Remember November”, which charted the Time (magazine) List of Best Viral Campaign Ads of 2010. Baiano would also direct a short film with Chris Christie.

2012 presidential election Baiano departed the RGA in 2011 and went on to direct for the presidential campaigns of Tim Pawlenty and Rick Perry during the 2012 presidential election. Baiano's ads for Tim Pawlenty were seen as a game changer in US politics and was cited as the most unforgettable of the election while Rick Perry's Proven Leadership ad was the most watched republican ad of 2012 charting AdAge's global Viral Video Chart as the only political ad for two consecutive weeks. Baiano's style was quickly becoming the talk of the political community, touted as pioneering an entire new genre of political ad making.

Former Canadian Prime Minister, Stephen Harper was criticized for directly plagiarizing Lucas Baiano's presidential ad for Tim Pawlenty entitled Courage to Stand for his closing ad during the 2011 Canadian federal election.

2014 United States Senate elections

Baiano directed for Mitch McConnell's victorious 2014 United States Senate election in Kentucky. In the same year, Baiano also produced an ad entitled Restore Leadership, which was referenced as one of the most memorable ads of the election cycle for the 2014 United States Senate election in New Mexico.

By early 2015, Baiano's signature style of ad making had spread, now incorporated by many politicians and presidential contenders throughout the industry.

== Awards ==
4-time American Association of Political Consultants Pollie Award winner (2011) with Republican Governors Association

5-time American Association of Political Consultants Pollie Award winner (2012) as President of We Are Politics

6-time American Association of Political Consultants Pollie Award winner (2013) as President of WeRPolitics

5-time American Association of Political Consultants Pollie Award winner (2014) as President of WeRPolitics

3-time American Association of Political Consultants Pollie Award winner (2016) as President of WeRPolitics

5-time American Advertising Awards Winner (2013, 2017)

National Capital / Chesapeake Bay Emmy Awards Judge

== Personal life ==
Lucas Baiano is married to Katarina (Alharmoosh) Baiano, a former producer for NBC and Sky News. They were married in 2015 in Washington, DC and have one 2-year-old son.
