= Rio Negro (Amazon) =

Tributary of the Amazon River

Rio Negro Guainía River
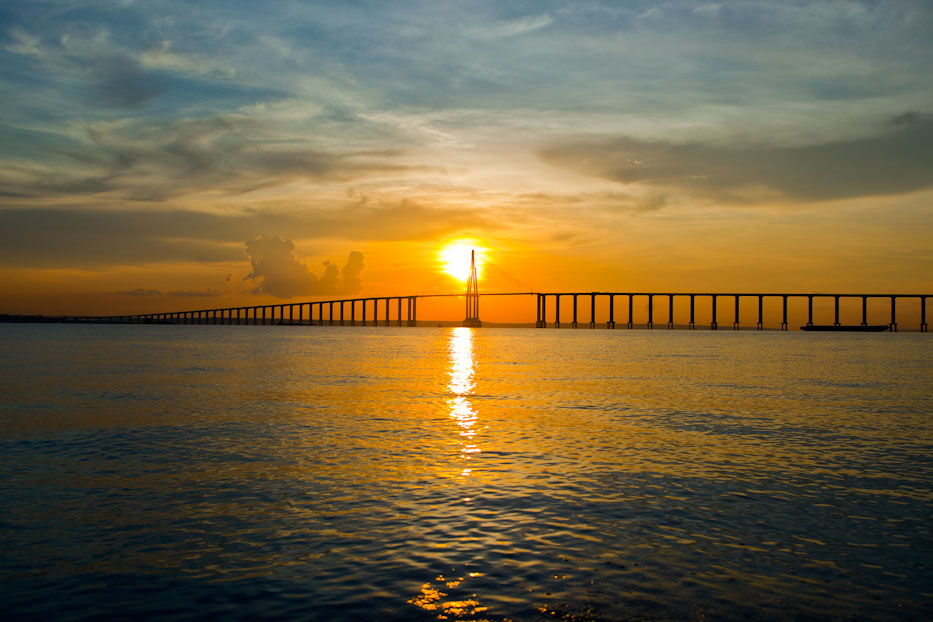
- Sunset over the Rio Negro, upstream from Manaus

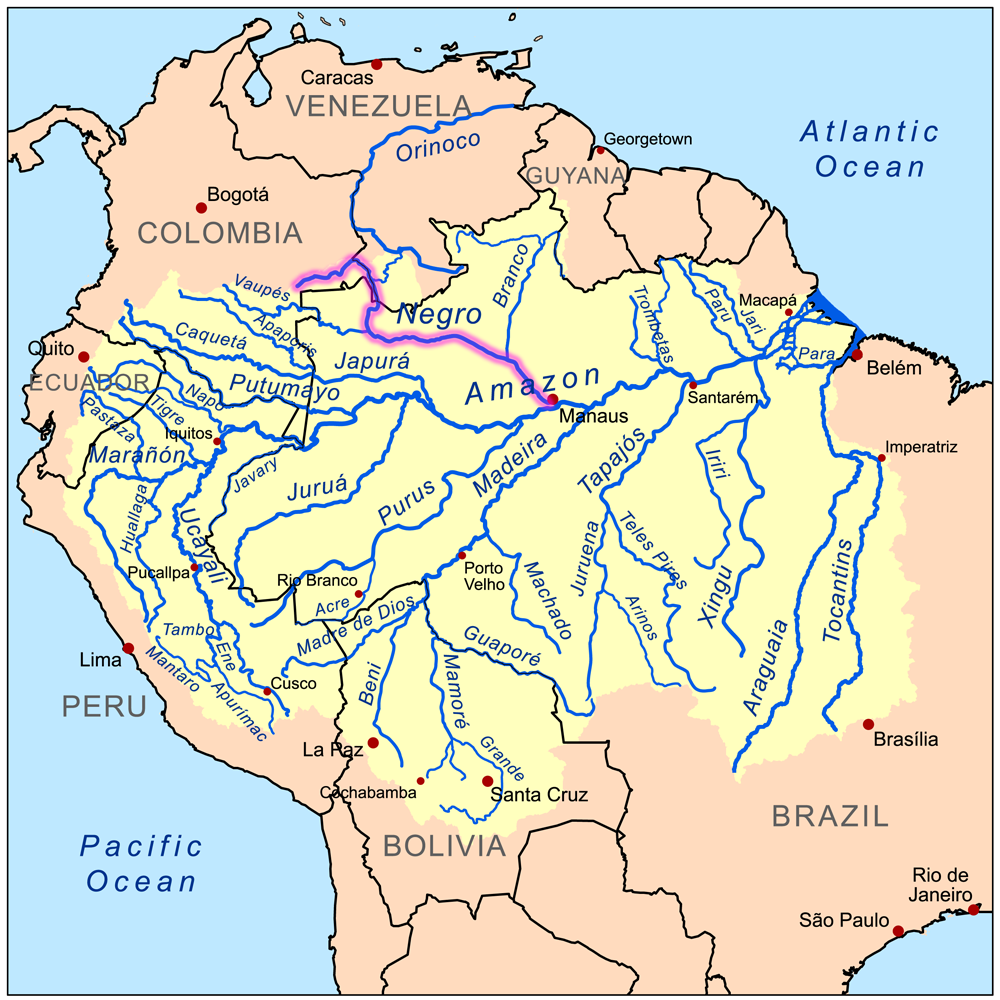
- Map showing the Rio Negro in the Amazon Basin
- Native name: Rio Negro (Portuguese); Río Negro (Spanish)

Location
- Countries: Colombia; Venezuela; Brazil

Physical characteristics
- Source: highlands of Colombia
  - location: Guainía Department, Amazon region, Colombia
  - coordinates: 1°56′50″N 70°1′55″W (approximately)
  - elevation: 250 m (820 ft) (approximately)
- Mouth: Amazon River
  - location: Manaus, Amazonas State, Brazil
  - coordinates: 3°08′00″S 59°54′30″W
  - elevation: 8 m (26 ft)
- Length: Rio Negro–Guainía 2,250 km (1,400 mi)
- Basin size: 714,577.6 km^{2} (275,900.0 mi^{2})
- Width
  - average: 2,450 m (8,040 ft)
- Depth
  - average: 20 m (66 ft) (Serrinha); 24 m (79 ft) to 31 m (102 ft) (Manaus)
  - maximum: 60 m (200 ft) (Manaus)
- Discharge
  - location: Manaus
  - average: (Period: 2015–2019)34,573 m^{3}/s (1,220,900 cu ft/s)
  - minimum: 4,240 m^{3}/s (150,000 cu ft/s)
  - maximum: 64,380 m^{3}/s (2,274,000 cu ft/s)
- Discharge
  - location: Paricatuba (Anavilhanas)
  - average: (Period: 2008–2019)34,444 m^{3}/s (1,216,400 cu ft/s)
  - minimum: 7,633 m^{3}/s (269,600 cu ft/s) (2009/10)
  - maximum: 65,510 m^{3}/s (2,313,000 cu ft/s) (2014/06)
- Discharge
  - location: Serrinha, 0°28′57.4716″S 64°49′36.6492″W
  - average: (Period: 1997–2015)16,845.5 m^{3}/s (594,890 cu ft/s)
  - minimum: 5,000 m^{3}/s (180,000 cu ft/s)
  - maximum: 30,000 m^{3}/s (1,100,000 cu ft/s)
- Discharge
  - location: São Felipe, 0°22′11.8056″N 67°18′42.9948″W
  - average: (Period: 1997–2014)8,314.5 m^{3}/s (293,620 cu ft/s)
  - minimum: 1,200 m^{3}/s (42,000 cu ft/s)
  - maximum: 15,500 m^{3}/s (550,000 cu ft/s)
- Discharge
  - location: Cucuí
  - average: (Period: 1997–2014)5,113.1 m^{3}/s (180,570 cu ft/s)
  - minimum: 400 m^{3}/s (14,000 cu ft/s)
  - maximum: 10,500 m^{3}/s (370,000 cu ft/s)

Basin features
- Progression: Amazon → Atlantic Ocean
- River system: Amazon River
- Tributaries
  - left: Casiquiare, Cauaburi, Marauiá, Macucuaú, Padauari, Demini, Jufari, Branco, Jauaperi, Camanaú, Baependi, Apuaú, Cuieiras, Tarumã Mirim, Tarumã Açu
  - right: Guainía (Upper Negro), Xié, Içana, Uaupés, Curicuriari, Marié, Tea, Uneiuxi, Aiuanã, Urubaxi, Ararirá, Cuiuni, Caurés, Unini, Jaú, Puduari

The Rio Negro (Spanish: Río Negro [ˈri.o ˈneɣɾo], Portuguese: Rio Negro [ˈʁi.u ˈneɡɾu], "Black River"), or Guainía as it is known in its upper part, is the largest left tributary of the Amazon River (accounting for about 14% of the water in the Amazon basin), the largest blackwater river in the world, and one of the world's ten largest rivers by average discharge. It originates in the tepuis of the department of Guainía, Colombia, and then flows southeastward before finally entering Brazil. Despite its high flow, the Rio Negro has a low sediment load (5.76 million tonnes per year on average in Manaus).

== Geography ==
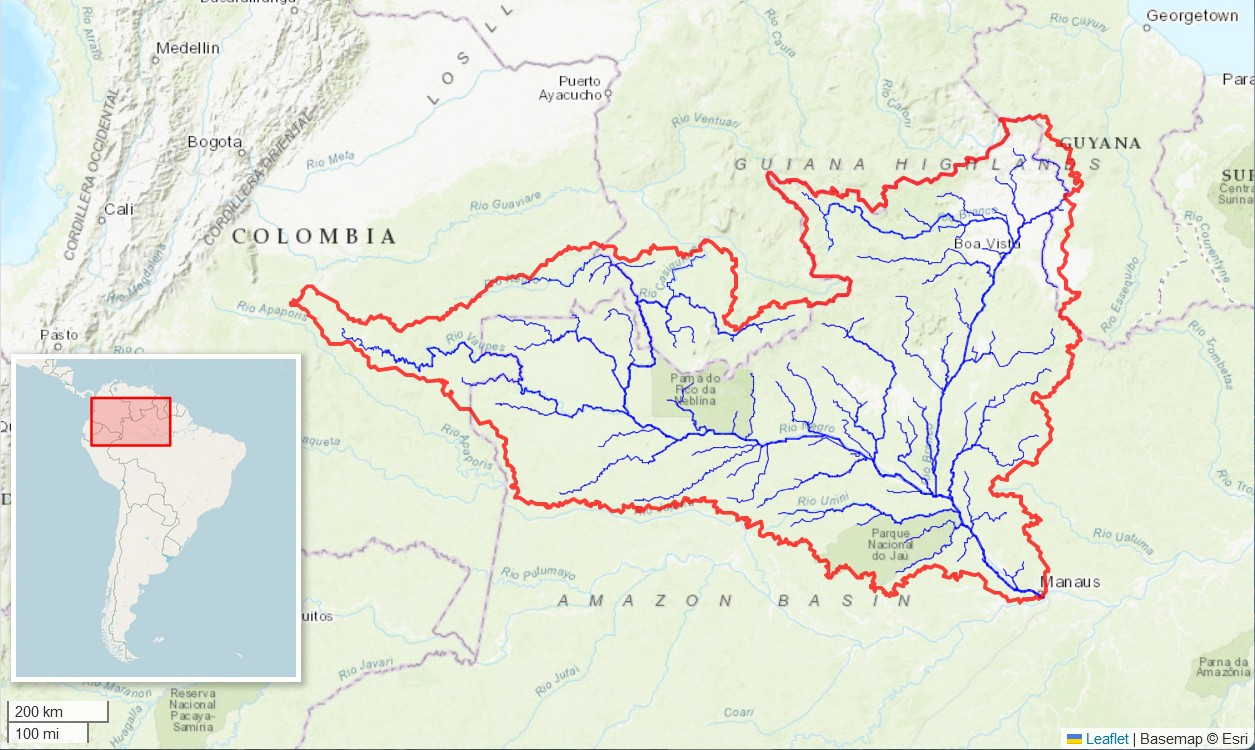
Rio Negro watershed (Interactive map)

=== Upper course ===
The source of the Rio Negro lies in Colombia, in the Department of Guainía where the river is known as the Guainía River. The young river generally flows in an east-northeasterly direction through the Puinawai National Reserve, passing several small indigenous settlements on its way, such as Cuarinuma, Brujas, Santa Rosa and Tabaquén. After roughly 400 km (250 mi) the river starts forming the border between Colombia's Department of Guainía and Venezuela's Amazonas State. After passing the Colombian community of Tonina and Macanal the river turns southwest. Maroa is the first Venezuelan town the river passes. 120 km (75 mi) further downstream the river receives the Casiquiare canal from the left (north), forming a unique link between the Orinoco and the Amazon river basin.

=== Middle course ===
The river now continues in a southeastern direction passing the Venezuelan town of San Carlos de Río Negro, its largest settlement on the river, and Colombia's San Felipe. In this stretch the river is constantly fed with tributaries from both sides, and it quickly grows in size creating large river islands, a common feature for all rivers in the Amazon basin. After forming the border between Colombia and Venezuela for 260 km (160 mi) the Rio Negro reaches the Piedra del Cocuy, an igneous rock formation from the Precambrian era, belonging to the Guyana Shield. Here the Tripoint of Colombia, Venezuela and Brazil is found in the middle of the river and it now completely enters Amazonas State, Brazil. After passing Cucuí, the river continues south, only temporarily turning west for several kilometers. In Missão Boa Vista the Içana River joins the Rio Negro and in São Joaquim the Uaupes River, the largest tributary of the Rio Negro, also enters from the right hand side. The Rio Negro now turns markedly towards the east, forming several rapids and small islets on its way. It then passes Sao Gabriel da Cachoeira an important commercial city. After several more rapids and imposing views of the Adormecida mountain chain the river leaves the Guyana shield it traversed in its upper and middle course.

=== Lower course ===
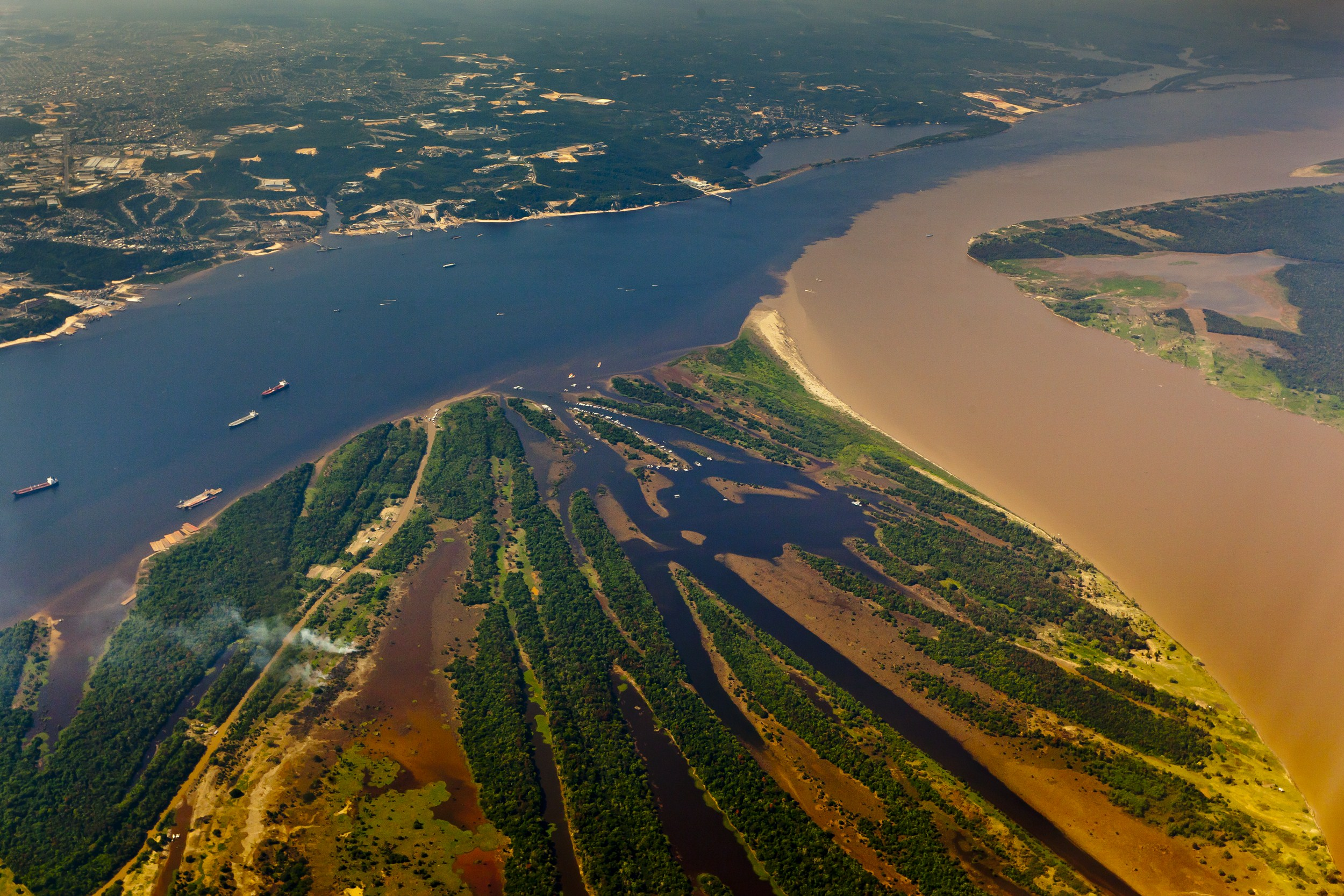
The confluence of the Amazon River and the Rio Negro at Manaus, Brazil.

After the Marié River enters the Rio Negro the river continues its eastward course forming many large islands and becoming very wide at several locations. It passes local communities such as Santa Isabel do Rio Negro. During the wet season, the river floods the country far and wide here, sometimes to a width of 30 km (19 mi), for long distances. During this season, from April until October, it is a succession of lagoons, full of long islands and intricate channels with a lot of water wildlife. Near Carvoeiro the last major tributary of the Rio Negro, the Branco River joins the Rio Negro and the river temporarily forms the border between the state of Roraima and Amazonas State, Brazil. The river now takes a more southeastern course, becoming again very wide in many stretches before reaching the biggest city on its course Manaus.

The Anavilhanas National Park, a 350,018 ha (864,910 acres) conservation unit that was originally an ecological station created in 1981, protects part of the Anavilhanas river archipelago in this part of the river. Below the archipelago, it meets the Solimões River to form the Amazon River, creating a phenomenon known as the Meeting of Waters.

=== Major tributaries ===
List of the major tributaries of the Rio Negro (from the mouth upwards)

| Left tributary | Right tributary | Length | | Basin size | | Average discharge | |
| Left tributary | Right tributary | km | mi | km^{2} | sq mi | m^{3}/s | cu ft/s |
|---|---|---|---|---|---|---|---|
| Rio Negro | | 2,362 | 1,468 | 719,216 | 277,691 | 30,640.8 | 1,082,070 |
Lower Rio Negro
| Taruma-Açu | | 139 | 86 | 1,372 | 530 | 52.3 | 1,850 |
| Cuieiras | | | | 3,441 | 1,329 | 144.2 | 5,090 |
| Apuaú | | | | 3,799.1 | 1,466.8 | 153.6 | 5,420 |
| | Puduari | | | 3,411.5 | 1,317.2 | 128.6 | 4,540 |
| Camanaú | | | | 11,832.2 | 4,568.4 | 408 | 14,400 |
| | Jaú | 400 | 250 | 18,896.6 | 7,296.0 | 869.2 | 30,700 |
| Jauaperi | | 554 | 344 | 39,823.5 | 15,375.9 | 1,336.8 | 47,210 |
| | Unini | 530 | 330 | 27,433 | 10,592 | 1,501.4 | 53,020 |
| Branco | | 1,430 | 890 | 190,789.2 | 73,664.1 | 5,400 | 190,000 |
| Jufari | | 311 | 193 | 12,590.5 | 4,861.2 | 446.6 | 15,770 |
| | Cauarés | | | 7,332.3 | 2,831.0 | 296 | 10,500 |
| Demini | | | | 39,769.6 | 15,355.1 | 1,357.9 | 47,950 |
| | Cuiuni | 400 | 250 | 11,776.1 | 4,546.8 | 491.6 | 17,360 |
| Igarapé Adairá | | | | 3,294.9 | 1,272.2 | 101.1 | 3,570 |
| | Ararirá | | | 3,425 | 1,322 | 114.6 | 4,050 |
| Ererê | | | | 3,251 | 1,255 | 115.7 | 4,090 |
| Padauari | | | | 17,384 | 6,712 | 606.8 | 21,430 |
| Daraá | | | | 3,053.3 | 1,178.9 | 114.9 | 4,060 |
| | Urubaxi | 250 | 160 | 6,855.9 | 2,647.1 | 311.6 | 11,000 |
| | Aiuanã | | | 4,590.7 | 1,772.5 | 185.2 | 6,540 |
| | Uneiuxi | | | 12,474.7 | 4,816.5 | 488.3 | 17,240 |
| | Teá | | | 6,365.9 | 2,457.9 | 201.4 | 7,110 |
| Marauiá | | | | 6,712 | 2,592 | 255.3 | 9,020 |
| Igarapé Inambu | | | | 4,618.8 | 1,783.3 | 140.6 | 4,970 |
| Cauaburi | | | | 12,139.3 | 4,687.0 | 442.9 | 15,640 |
Middle Rio Negro
| | Marié | 800 | 500 | 25,378 | 9,799 | 1,226.8 | 43,320 |
| | Curicuriari | | | 14,202.2 | 5,483.5 | 916.8 | 32,380 |
| | Uaupés | 1,375 | 854 | 64,370.4 | 24,853.6 | 4,344.9 | 153,440 |
| | Içana | 696 | 432 | 35,675.3 | 13,774.3 | 2,278.9 | 80,480 |
| | Xié | | | 8,222 | 3,175 | 488.1 | 17,240 |
Upper Rio Negro
| Casiquiare | | 354 | 220 | 42,478 | 16,401 | 2,575.8 | 90,960 |
| | Guainía | 617 | 383 | 28,899.5 | 11,158.2 | 2,432.7 | 85,910 |

== Discharge ==
Rio Negro at Manaus (1970–2023):
| Year | Average discharge (m^{3}/s) |
|---|---|
| 2023 | 20,000 |
| 2022 | 33,000 |
| 2021 | 35,000 |
| 2020 | 30,000 |
| 2019 | 32,600 |
| 2018 | 29,300 |
| 2017 | 31,200 |
| 2016 | 25,000 |
| 2015 | 34,000 |
| 2014 | 40,000 |
| 2013 | 32,600 |
| 2012 | 29,700 |
| 2011 | 23,200 |
| 2010 | 20,500 |
| 2009 | 32,000 |
| 2008 | 33,000 |
| 2007 | 29,500 |
| 2006 | 25,500 |
| 2005 | 28,200 |
| 2004 | 33,000 |
| 2003 | 31,600 |
| 2002 | 29,400 |
| 2001 | 31,000 |
| 2000 | 31,700 |
| 1999 | 28,000 |
| 1998 | 20,500 |
| 1997 | 29,000 |
| 1996 | 30,000 |
| 1995 | 27,400 |
| 1994 | 38,000 |

(continues)
| Year | Average discharge (m^{3}/s) |
|---|---|
| 1993 | 33,700 |
| 1992 | 23,000 |
| 1991 | 25,500 |
| 1990 | 29,500 |
| 1989 | 34,500 |
| 1988 | 30,800 |
| 1987 | 44,000 |
| 1986 | 40,300 |
| 1985 | 34,000 |
| 1984 | 32,400 |
| 1983 | 27,800 |
| 1982 | 32,000 |
| 1981 | 27,700 |
| 1980 | 26,500 |
| 1979 | 34,200 |
| 1978 | 38,700 |
| 1977 | 36,000 |
| 1976 | 36,300 |
| 1975 | 42,000 |
| 1974 | 50,800 |
| 1973 | 40,400 |
| 1972 | 40,800 |
| 1971 | 39,000 |
| 1970 | 30,000 |
| 1926 | 17,500 |

Average discharge

| Period | Discharge | Ref. |
|---|---|---|
Encontro das Águas
| 1979–2015 | 30,640.8 m^{3}/s (1,082,070 cu ft/s) | |
| 1971–2000 | 29,615.7 m^{3}/s (1,045,870 cu ft/s) | |
Manaus 3°8′19.3704″S 60°1′39.522″W
| 2015–2019 | 34,573 m^{3}/s (1,220,900 cu ft/s) | |
| 1980–2006 | 35,943 m^{3}/s (1,269,300 cu ft/s) | |
| 1973–1992 | 28,400 m^{3}/s (1,000,000 cu ft/s) | |
| 1971–2000 | 29,607.4 m^{3}/s (1,045,580 cu ft/s) | |
Paricatuba 3°4′53.2848″S 60°14′0.4812″W
| 2008–2019 | 34,444 m^{3}/s (1,216,400 cu ft/s) | |
| 1971–2000 | 29,518.2 m^{3}/s (1,042,430 cu ft/s) | |
Barcelos 0°58′59.6964″S 62°51′32.3892″W
| 1971–2000 | 19,545.2 m^{3}/s (690,230 cu ft/s) | |
Serrinha 0°28′57.4716″S 64°49′36.6492″W
| 1997–2015 | 16,845.5 m^{3}/s (594,890 cu ft/s) | |
| 1980–2006 | 18,082 m^{3}/s (638,600 cu ft/s) | |
| 1971–2000 | 16,611.9 m^{3}/s (586,640 cu ft/s) | |
São Gabriel da Cachoeira 0°8′2.9616″S 67°5′38.2956″W
| 1971–2000 | 13,150.7 m^{3}/s (464,410 cu ft/s) | |
São Felipe 0°22′11.8056″N 67°18′42.9948″W
| 1997–2014 | 8,314.5 m^{3}/s (293,620 cu ft/s) | |
| 1980–2006 | 7,984 m^{3}/s (282,000 cu ft/s) | |
| 1971–2000 | 8,244.8 m^{3}/s (291,160 cu ft/s) | |
Cucuí 1°11′16.7316″S 66°50′23.46″W
| 1997–2014 | 5,113.1 m^{3}/s (180,570 cu ft/s) | |
| 1980–2006 | 4,940 m^{3}/s (174,000 cu ft/s) | |
| 1971–2000 | 5,065.1 m^{3}/s (178,870 cu ft/s) | |

== History ==
The river was named by the Spanish explorer Francisco de Orellana, who first came upon it in 1541. By the middle of the 17th century, Jesuits had settled along its banks in the midst of numerous tribes: Manau, Aruák, and Tarumá Indians. After 1700, slaving along the river was common, and Native American populations were greatly diminished after contact with Eurasian diseases. In 1800 German scientist Alexander von Humboldt and French botanist Aimé Bonpland explored the river. During 1852–1854 Richard Spruce and Alfred Russel Wallace made numerous observations and botanical collections. During a 1924–25 expedition, Alexander H. Rice of Harvard University traveled up the Orinoco, traversed the Casiquiare canal, and descended the Rio Negro to the Amazon at Manaus. It was the first expedition to use aerial photography and shortwave radio for mapping of the region. In 1968, the Rio Negro was navigated by an SRN6 hovercraft during a National Geographic expedition. This area was the filming location for Survivor: The Amazon in 2003.

== Fauna and flora ==
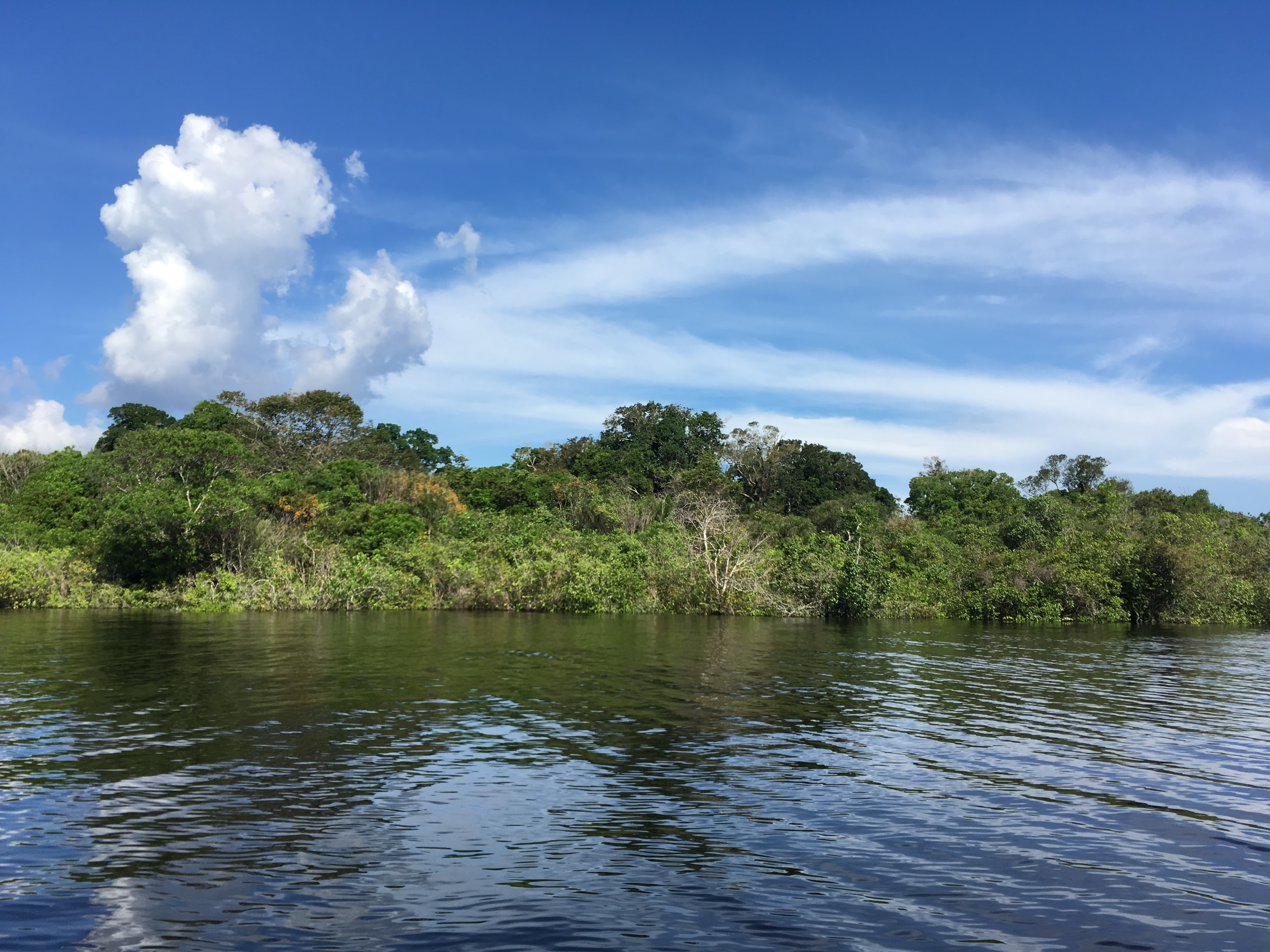
Rio Negro near Manaus

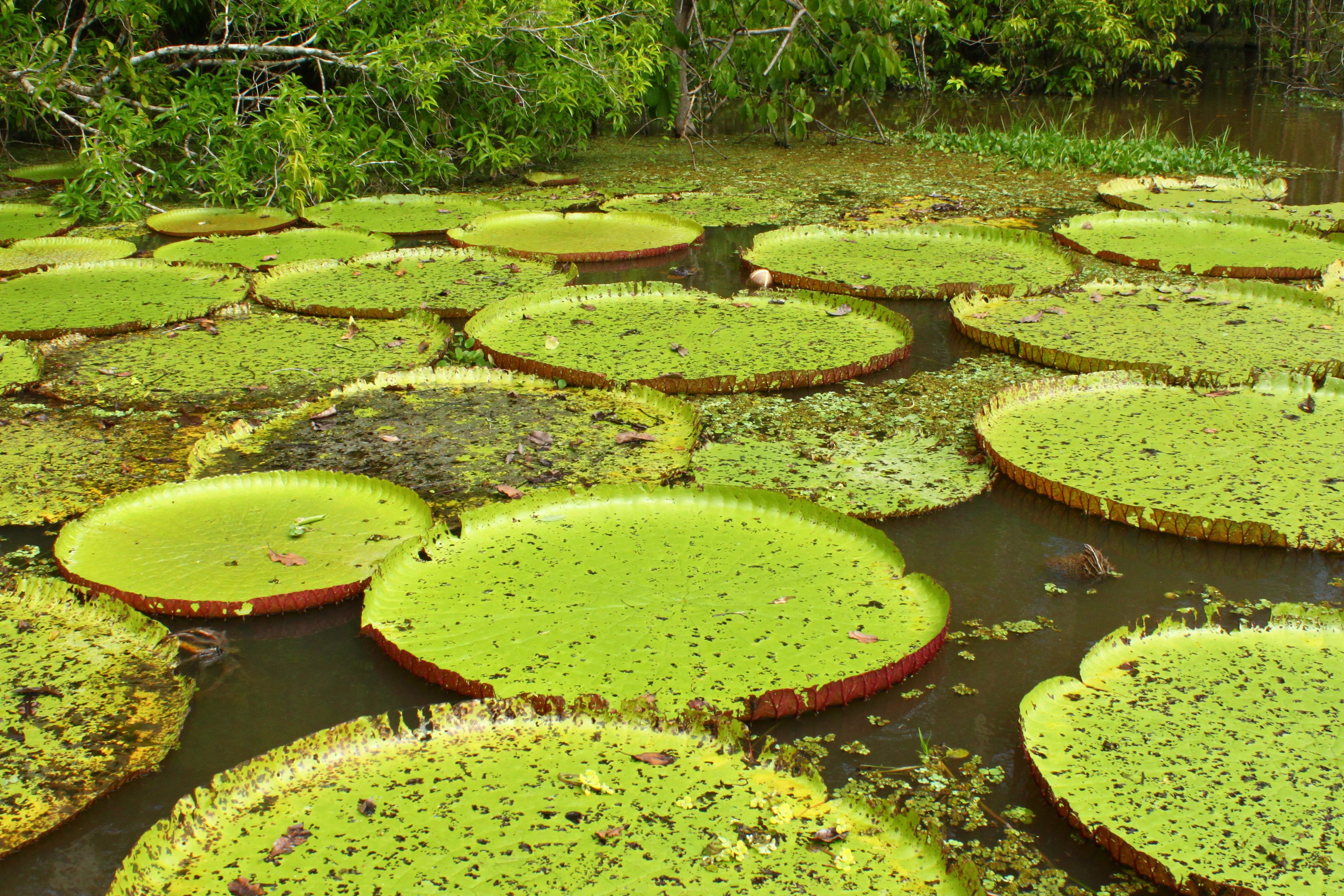
Victoria amazonica

While the name Rio Negro means Black River, its waters are similar in colour to strong tea, which is typical of blackwater rivers. The dark color comes from humic acid due to an incomplete breakdown of phenol-containing vegetation from sandy clearings. The river was named because it looks black from a distance.

Much has been written on the productivity of the Rio Negro and other blackwater rivers. The older idea that these are "hunger rivers" is giving way, with new research, to the recognition that the Rio Negro, for example, supports a large fishing industry and has numerous turtle beaches. If explorers did not find many Indigenous peoples along the Rio Negro during the 17th century, it is likely that their populations were reduced because of new infectious diseases and warfare rather than low river productivity.

Rio Negro has a very high species richness. About 700 fish species have been documented in the river basin, and it is estimated that the total is 800–900 fish species, including almost 100 endemics and several undescribed species. Among these are many that are important in the aquarium trade, including the cardinal tetra. As a result of the Casiquiare canal, many aquatic species are found both in the Rio Negro and Orinoco. Because the Casiquiare includes both blackwater and clear- to whitewater sections, only relatively adaptable species are able to pass through it between the two river systems.

== In media ==
The sixth season of Survivor, Survivor: The Amazon was filmed in Rio Negro in 2003. Also Meeting of the Waters by Animal Collective was recorded in Rio Negro in 2016.

Henryk Wars and his Orchestra composed and recorded a pasodoble named "Rio Negro", with Edward Jasinski in 1938, which became an evergreen hit in Poland.
