= Urubu River (Amazonas) =

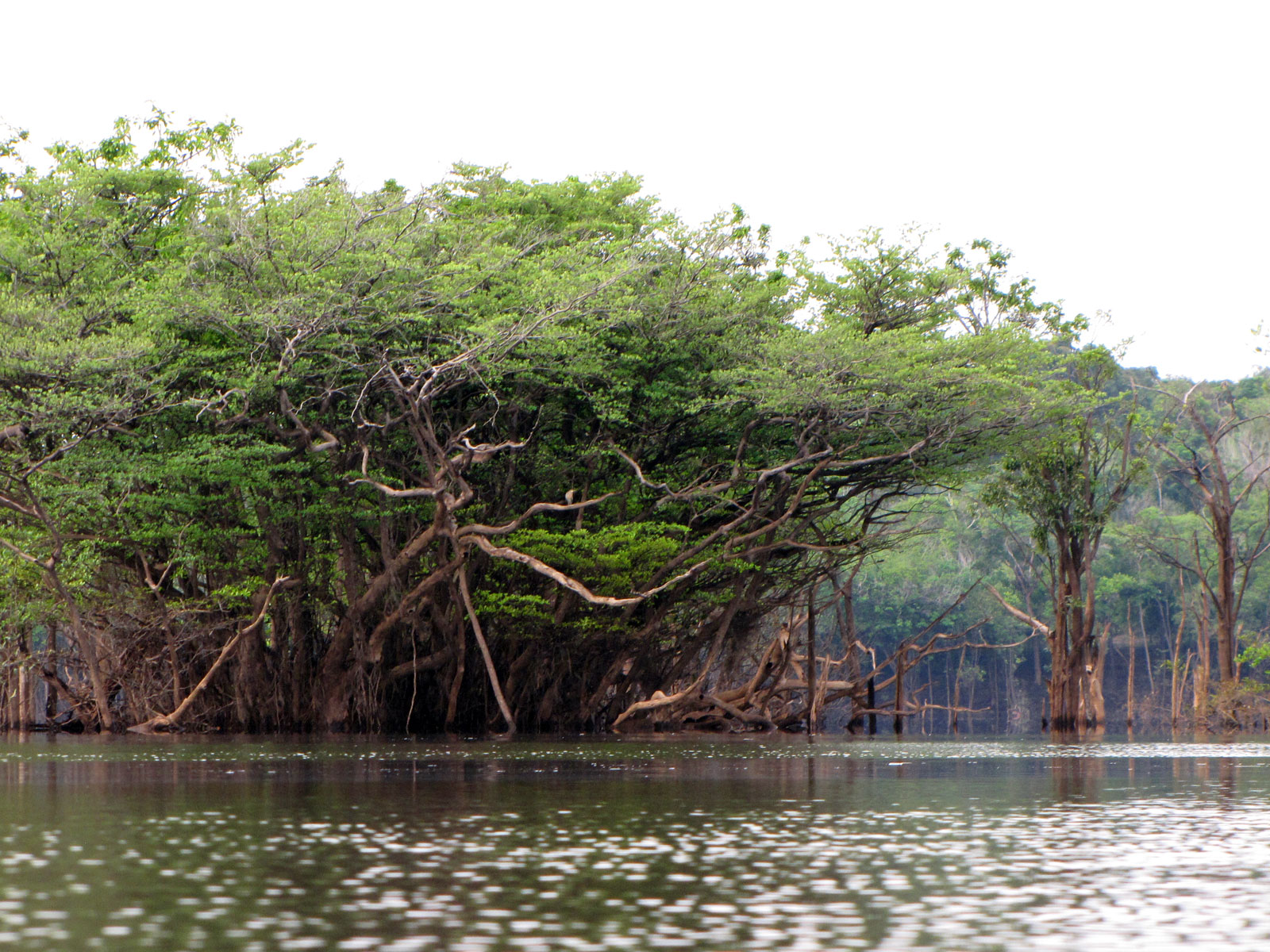

- Location within Brazil
- Native name: Rio Urubu (Portuguese)

Location
- Country: Brazil

Physical characteristics
- Source
  - location: Amazonas
- Mouth
  - location: Silves, Amazonas
  - coordinates: 2.843412°S 58.254823°W
- Length: 430 kilometres (270 mi)
- Discharge
  - average: 450 m^{3}/s (16,000 cu ft/s)

Urubu River (Portuguese: Rio Urubu) is a river in Amazonas state in north-western Brazil. It is a tributary of the Amazon River, and it branches to the north (or to the left if facing downstream) near the town of Itacoatiara. It is a blackwater river.

== Course ==
The source of the Urubu is to the north of Presidente Figueiredo, where it is protected by the 374,700 hectares (926,000 acres) Caverna do Maroaga Environmental Protection Area, established in 1990. It flows in a southwest direction, parallel to the Uatumã River. In the municipality of Rio Preto da Eva the river forms the northeast boundary of the 27,342 hectares (67,560 acres) Rio Urubu State Forest, created in 2003. The river ultimately flows into Lake Urubu, which is connected by several channels to the Amazon River. The Urubu River discharges into the Amazon via the Preto da Eva River and the Uatumã River.

== Population ==
The region has been inhabited for more than 3,000 years by Arawak people, who arrived in different waves. In 1702, the Portuguese brought a group of Aruã people here from the island Marajó. The Urubu River Indigenous Terrirory is inhabited by Mura people.

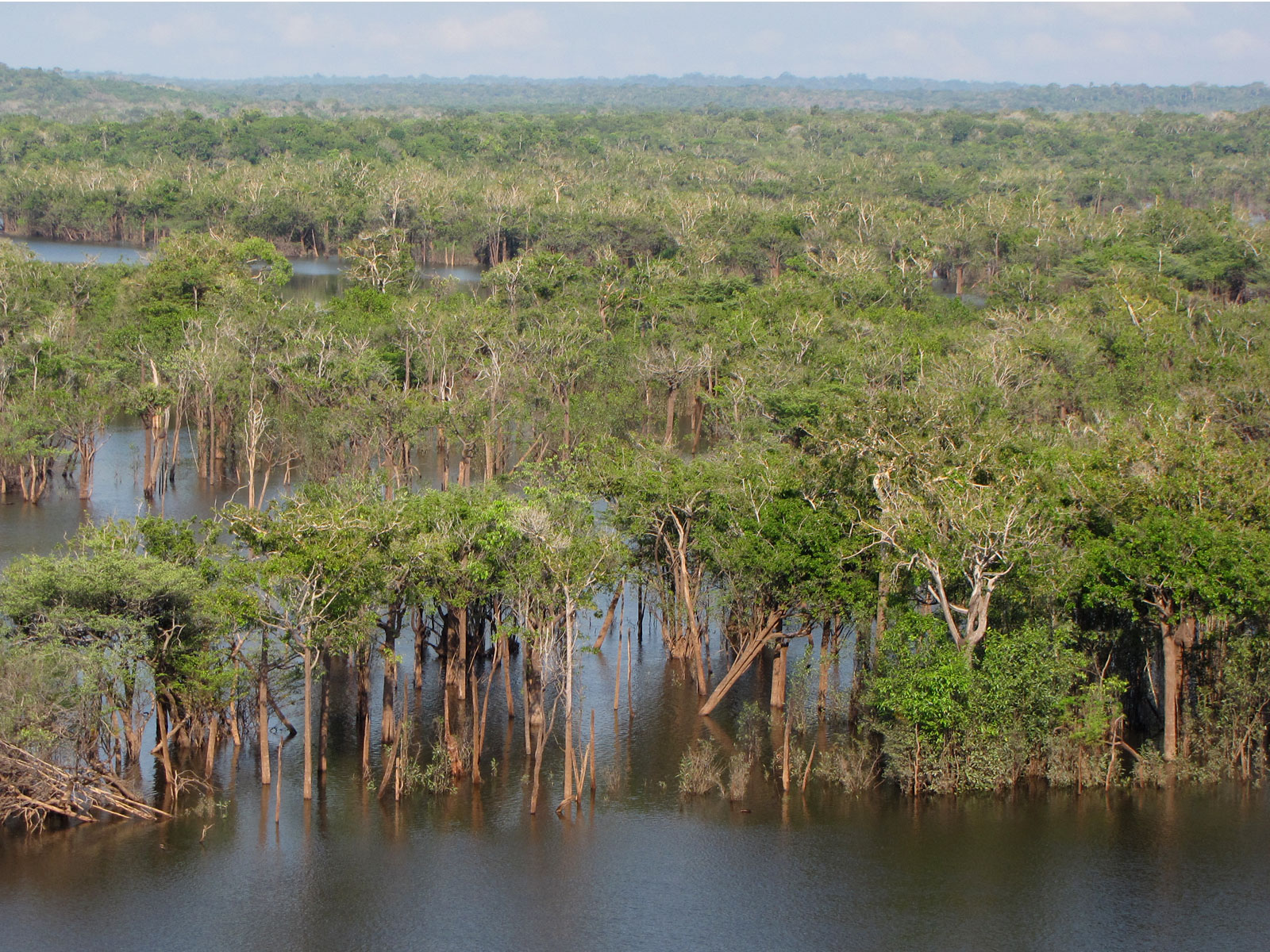
Urubu River flooded forest

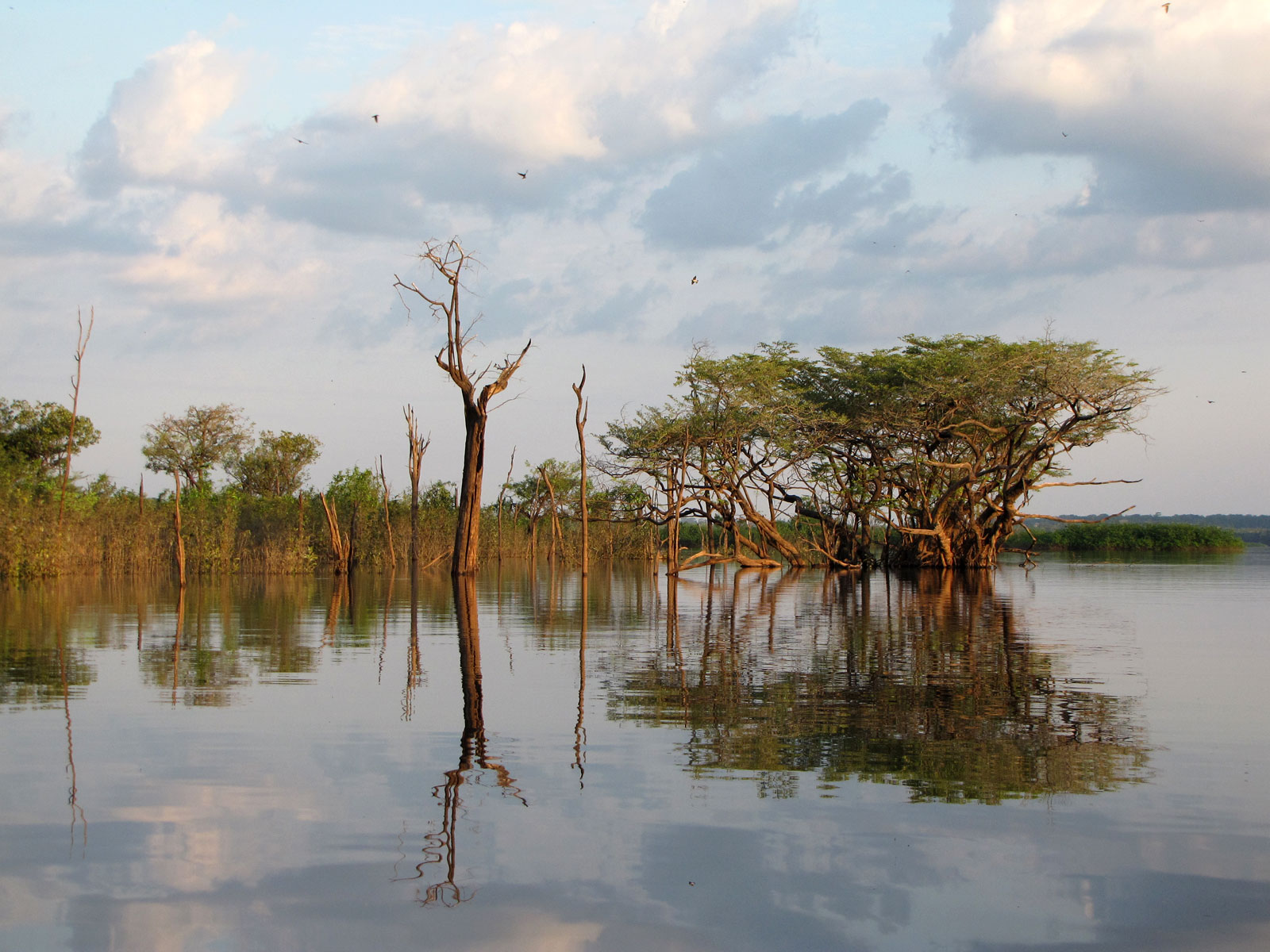
Trees in the Urubu River

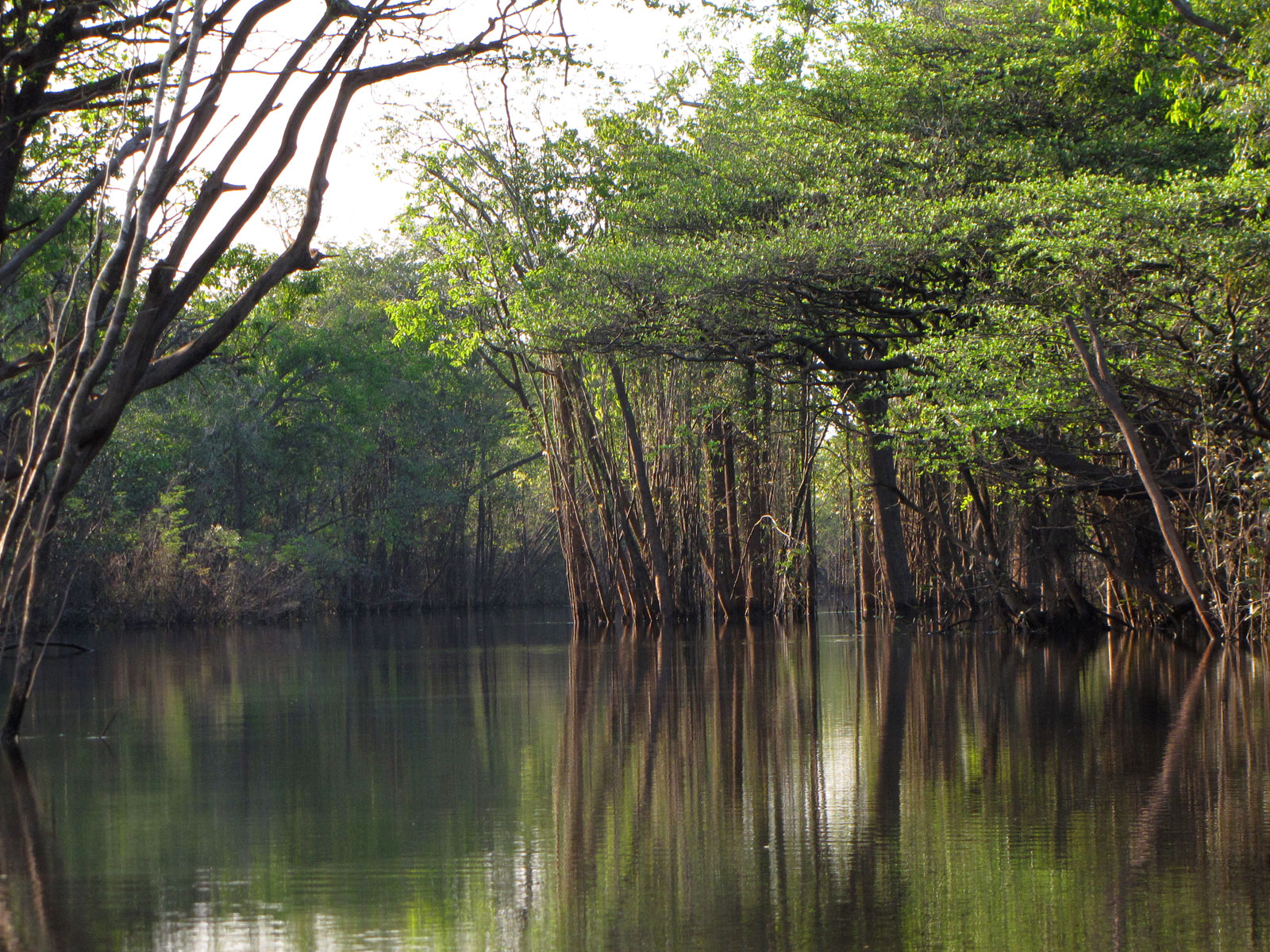
Urubu River channel

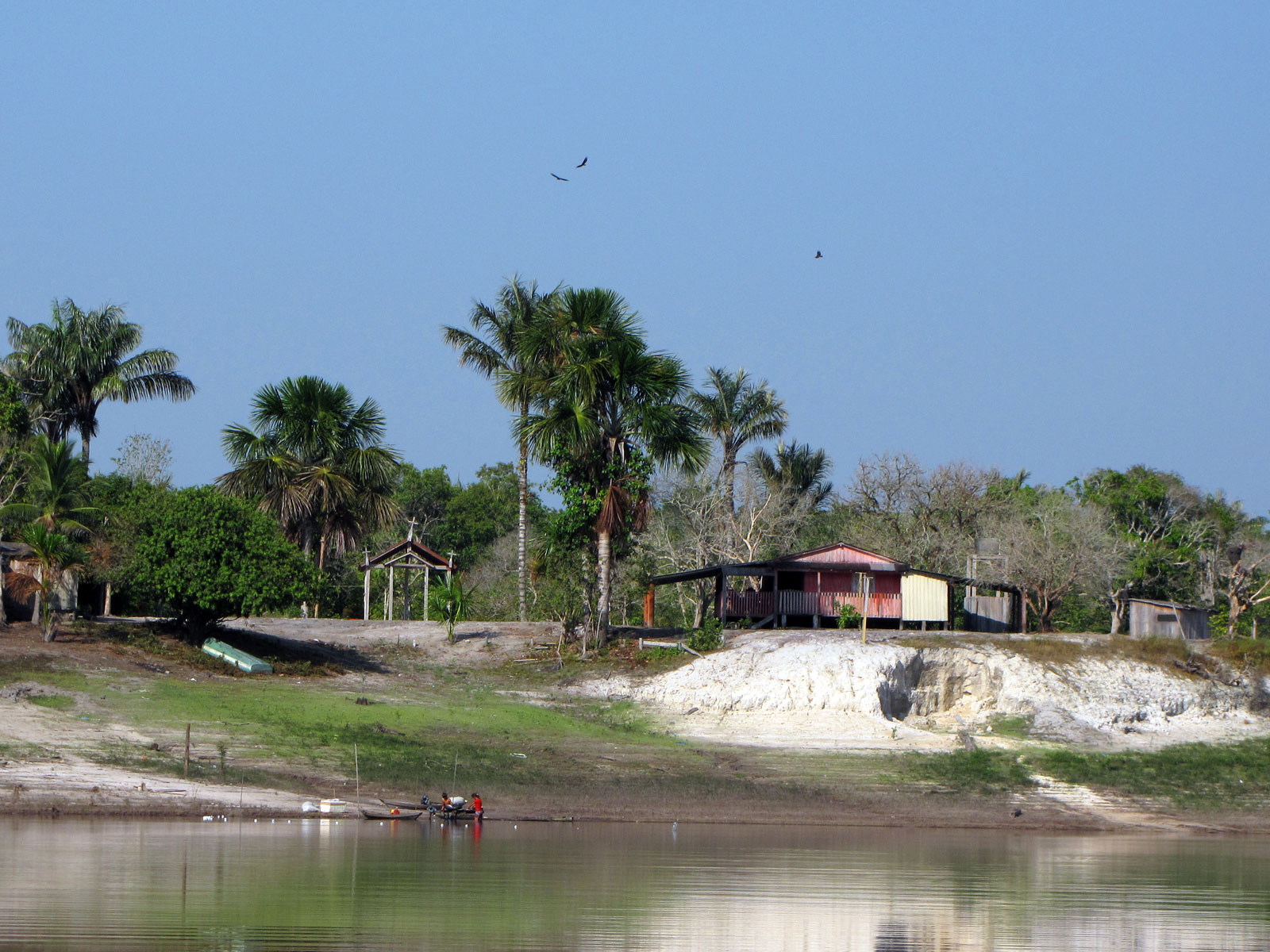
House on the Urubu River

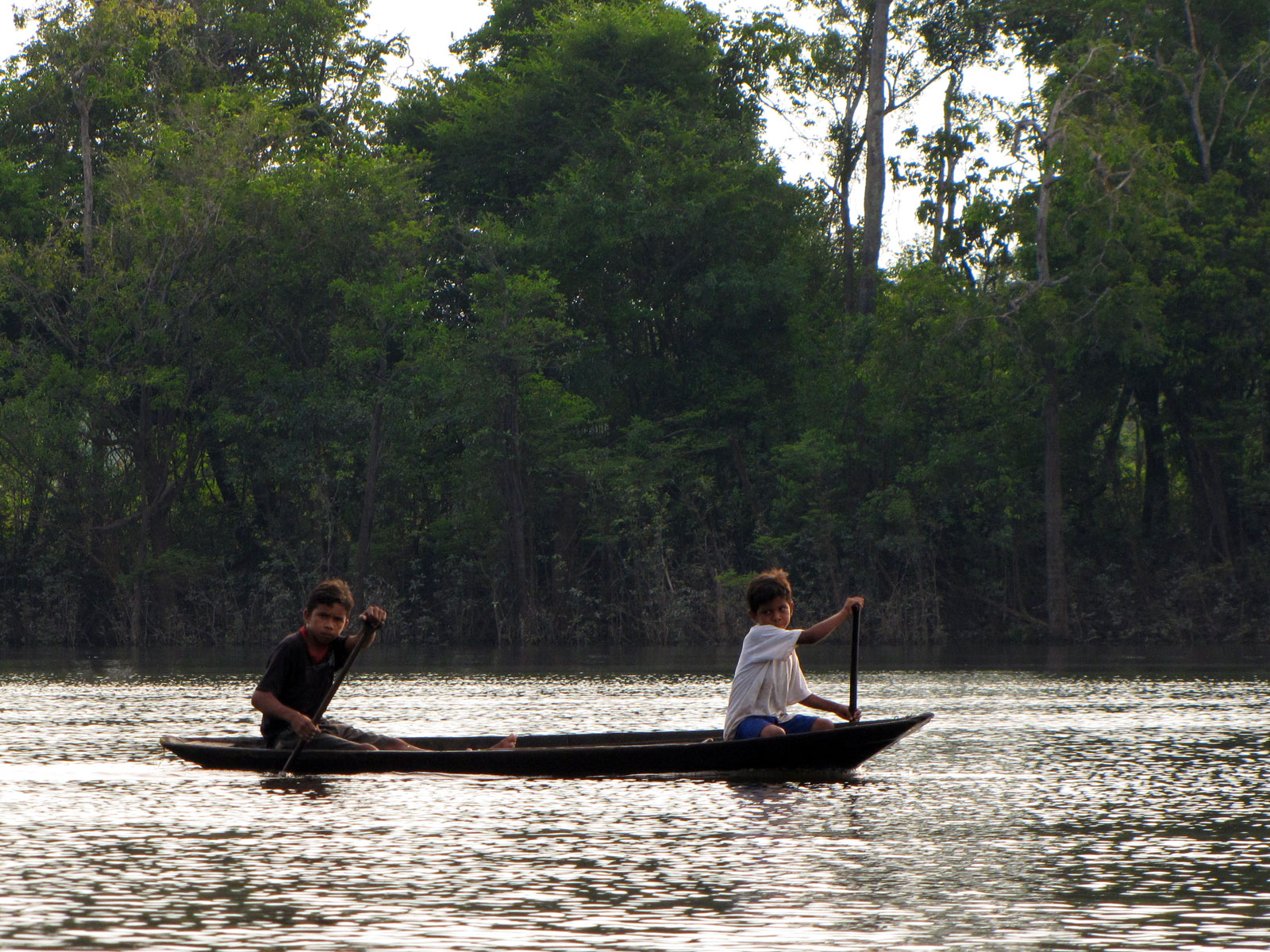
Canoeing on the Rio Urubu

== See also ==
- List of rivers of Amazonas
