= Silves Municipality =

Silves Municipality may refer to:

- Silves Municipality, Portugal
- Silves, Amazonas, Brazil (municipality)
