= Balbina Dam =

Dam in Amazonas, Brazil

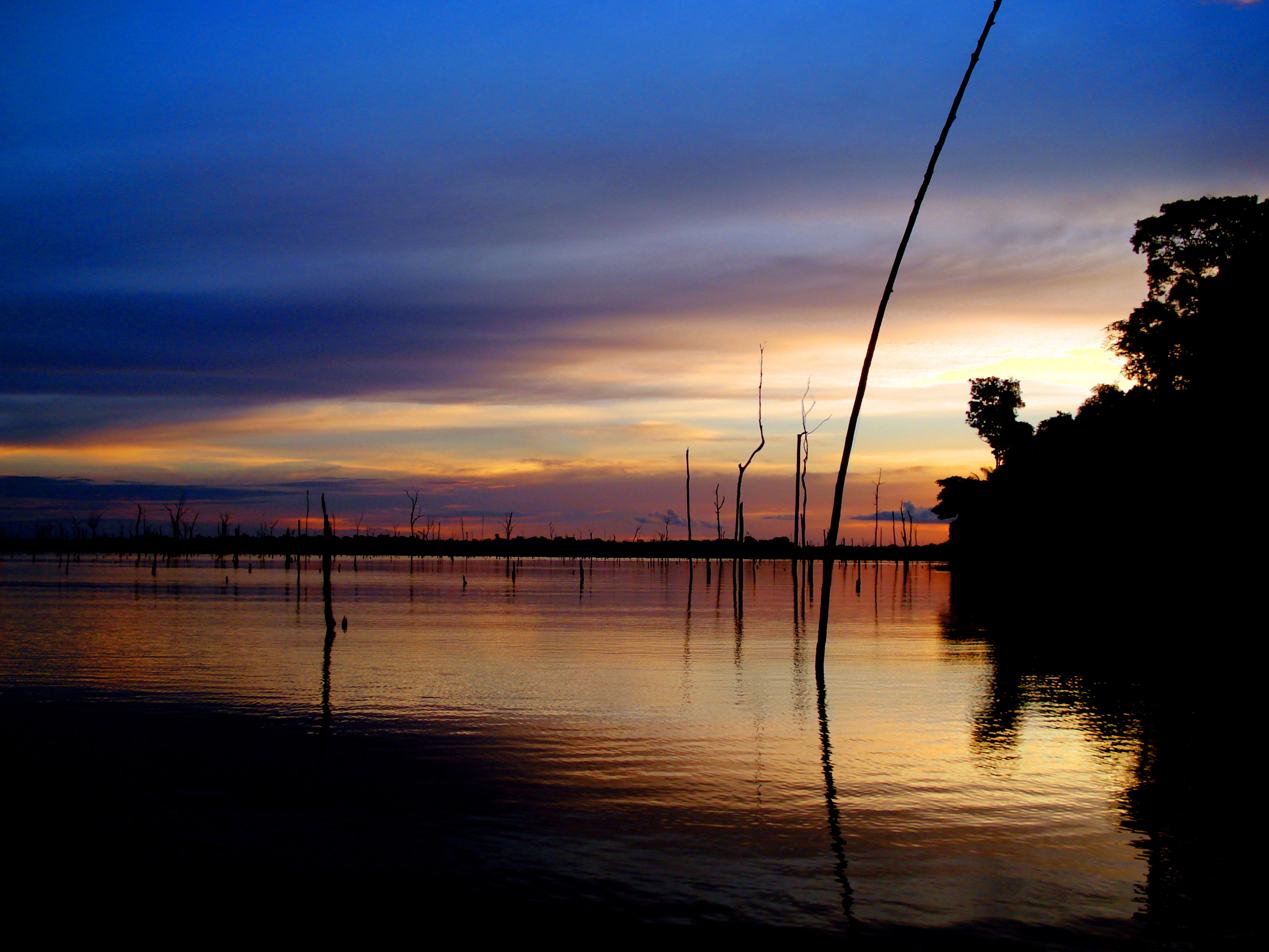
- Interactive map of Balbina Dam
- Location: Amazonas, Brazil
- Coordinates: 01°55′02″S 59°28′25″W
- Construction began: 1985
- Opening date: 1989

Dam and spillways
- Impounds: Uatumã River
- Height: 33 m (108 ft)
- Length: 2,920 m (9,580 ft)

Reservoir
- Creates: Balbina Reservoir
- Total capacity: 17.54 km^{3} (14,220,000 acre⋅ft)
- Catchment area: 16,502 km^{2} (6,371 sq mi)
- Surface area: 2,360 km^{2} (910 sq mi)
- Maximum water depth: 30 m (98 ft)

Power Station
- Operator: Manaus Energia
- Commission date: 1989
- Turbines: 5 × 50 MW (67,000 hp)
- Installed capacity: 250 MW (340,000 hp)

The Balbina Dam (Portuguese: Usina Hidrelétrica de Balbina) is a hydroelectric dam and power station on the Uatumã River in the Amazon rainforest, Brazil. The location is under the municipality of Presidente Figueiredo jurisdiction, in the state of Amazonas.

== Structure ==
The Balbina Dam was built from 1985 to 1989 and is managed by Manaus Energia, under the Eletronorte system. The first of five generators began operating in February 1989. The dam has an installed capacity of 250 megawatts (340,000 hp) and floods a 2,360-square-kilometre (910 sq mi) area.

== Controversy ==
The dam was established to provide a renewable electricity supply to the city of Manaus but was considered by locals a controversial project from the start, due to the loss of forest and displacement of tribal homes grounds. About 2,928.5 square kilometres (1,130.7 sq mi) of land formerly occupied by the Waimiri-Atroari was removed from the Waimiri Atroari Indigenous Territory and flooded. The dam was also criticized for its expensive construction and maintenance costs. As a result of the methane released from its vast reservoir, proportional to its output, the Balbina Dam emits ten times more greenhouse gases than a coal plant. The dam is the least efficient in Brazil in terms of the area flooded for each megawatt generated.

== Conservation ==
The lake and island ecosystems formed by the dam are protected by the 938,720 hectares (2,319,600 acres) Uatumã Biological Reserve, a strictly protected conservation unit created in 2002. The west shore is protected by the 374,700 hectares (926,000 acres) Caverna do Maroaga Environmental Protection Area, established in 1990. Downstream from the dam the Uatumã runs through the 424,430 hectares (1,048,800 acres) Uatumã Sustainable Development Reserve, created in 2004. The dam regulates the river flow through the reserve, and reduces seasonal flooding.

== See also ==
- List of power stations in Brazil

== Sources ==
- APA Caverna do Maroaga (Presidente Figueiredo) (in Portuguese), ISA: Instituto Socioambiental
- Baines, Stephen G. (27 October 2008), "The Reconstruction of Waimiri-Atroari Territory", in Adolfo de Oliveira (ed.), Decolonising Indigenous Rights, Routledge, ISBN 978-1-134-30076-1
- Balbina, a hidrelétrica que não deu certo, CEPA: Centro de Ensino e Pesquisa Aplicada
- Philip M. Fearnside (26 August 2006), Balbina Dam, Amazonas, Department of Ecology, National Institute for Research in the Amazon (INPA), doi:10.1007/BF01867675, S2CID 154405904
- RDS do Uatumã (in Portuguese), ISA: Instituto Socioambiental
- Sobre a RDS (in Portuguese), RDS do Uatumã, archived from the original on 17 September 2016
- Unidade de Conservação: Reserva Biológica do Uatumã (in Portuguese), MMA: Ministério do Meio Ambiente
