= Caverna do Maroaga Environmental Protection Area =

Environmental protection area in Amazonas, Brazil

- Área de Proteção Ambiental Caverna do Maroaga
- IUCN category V (protected landscape/seascape)
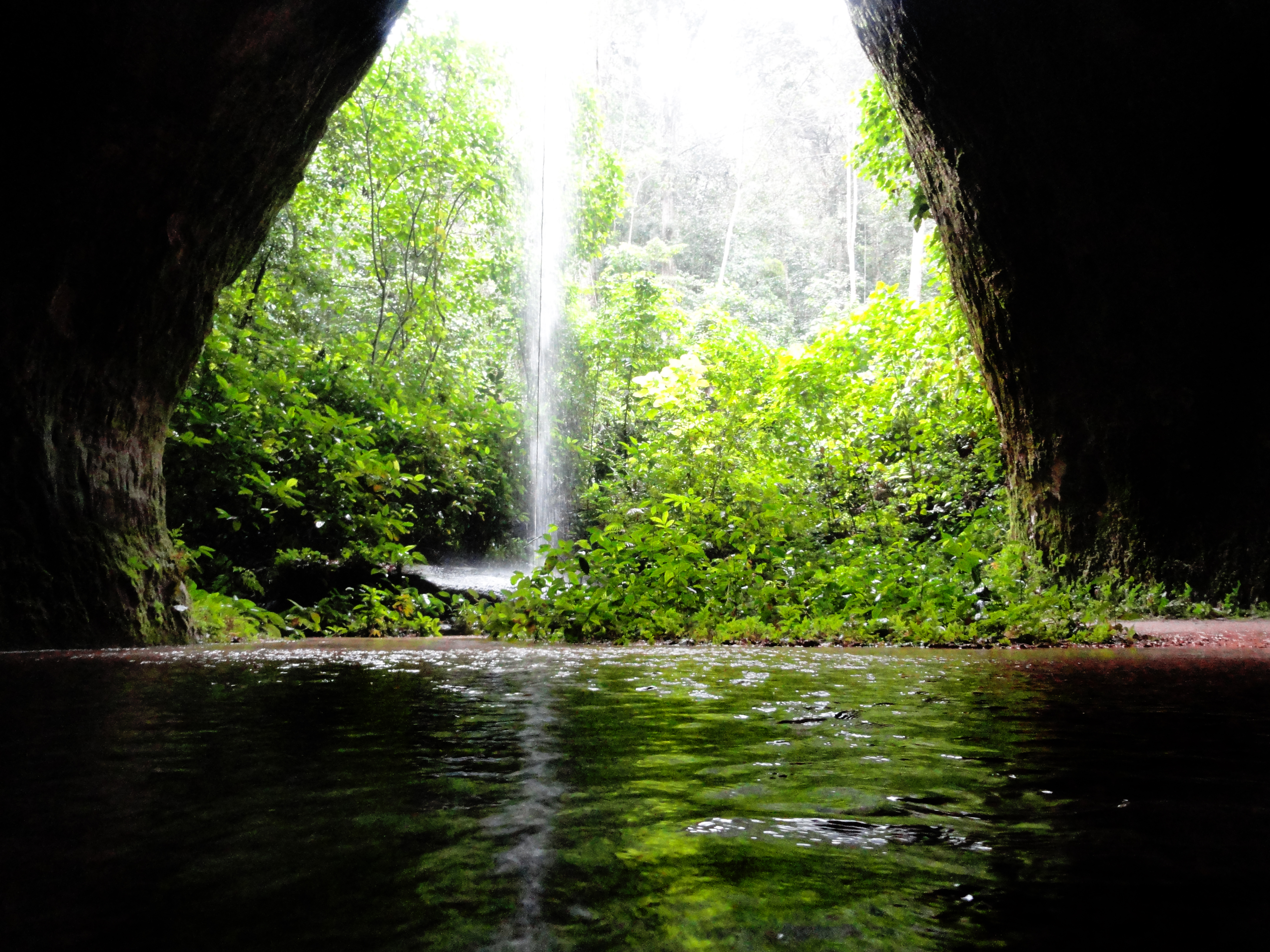
- Caverna Maroaga

- Location within Brazil
- Nearest city: Presidente Figueiredo, Amazonas
- Coordinates: 1.963502°S 59.849963°W
- Area: 374,700 hectares (926,000 acres)
- Designation: Environmental protection area
- Created: 9 March 1990
- Administrator: Secretaria de Estado do Meio Ambiente do Amazonas

The Caverna do Maroaga Environmental Protection Area (Portuguese: Área de Proteção Ambiental Caverna do Maroaga) is an environmental protection area in the state of Amazonas, Brazil. It contains caves and waterfalls that have tourist potential if the infrastructure were provided.

== Location ==
The Caverna do Maroaga Environmental Protection Area is in the municipality of Presidente Figueiredo, Amazonas. It has an area of 374,700 hectares (926,000 acres). The APA protects the southwest shore of the reservoir of the Balbina Dam, covering the area between highway BR-174 and the reservoir, and including land on both sides of the AM-240 highway that leads from BR-174 to the dam structure in the south. The Uatumã River, which drains the dam, forms the eastern boundary of the APA. The Uatumã Biological Reserve protects the land on the northeast side of the reservoir. The APA adjoins the Waimiri Atroari Indigenous Territory to the north.

The APA includes parts of the basins of the Urubu, Uatumã and Abonari rivers, and contains two sub-tributaries of the Pardo River, the Canoas and Canastra streams. The Rio Urubu State Forest is to the south of the APA.

== History ==
The Caverna do Maroaga Environmental Protection Area (APA) was created by state decree 12.836 of 9 March 1990. The APA was created to preserve the speleological heritage of the municipality, with or without direct use by tourists. The boundaries were adjusted by decree 16.364 of 7 December 1994. It became part of the Central Amazon Ecological Corridor, established in 2002. The deliberative council was created on 1 January 2009, and its regulations were approved on 18 January 2010.

== Environment ==
The caves in the area are in the oldest geological formation of the north of the Brazilian Amazon. The cave that gives the APA its name is itself named after a Waimiri-Atroari leader who is said to have taken refuge there in the 1960s during construction of BR-174. There is evidence of prehistoric people in the Maroaga cave.

Vegetation is dense rainforest with emergent trees typical of terra firma. There is also open campina forest and igapó forest. 96% of the vegetation is dense rainforest, 3% open rainforest and 1% campinarana-rainforest contact. Flora include species of orchids and bromeliads. There is a diverse vertebrate fauna including Guyanan red howler (Alouatta macconnelli), red-handed tamarin (Saguinus midas), jaguar (Panthera onca), margay (Leopardus wiedii), neotropical otter (Lontra longicaudis), giant otter (Pteronura brasiliensis), harpy eagle (Harpia harpyja) and Guianan cock-of-the-rock (Rupicola rupicola). The Guianan cock-of-the-rock is prized by wildlife traffickers. The APA is notable for many species of bats.

== Economy ==
There are about 42 communities in the APA. Agriculture is the main economic activity, including cultivation of banana, cassava, cocoa, rice, corn, cupuaçu and guaraná. Other economic activities include cattle raising, logging, fishing and crafts for the Manaus market. Commercially valuable tree species such as Hymenolobium petraeum, bay, cedar and mahogany are used in construction and furniture manufacturing. The many waterfalls and caves in the APA make it attractive to tourists. The Porteira waterfall is a natural tourist attraction. There is no security, surveillance, lodgings or restaurants near the waterfalls that form the main tourist attractions, and some environmental damage is caused by the visitors.

== Sources ==
- APA Caverna do Maroaga (Presidente Figueiredo) (in Portuguese), ISA: Instituto Socioambiental
- Área de Proteção Ambiental Estadual Caverna do Maroaga (in Portuguese), Via Rural, archived from the original on 2016-10-21
- CEC Central da Amazônia (in Portuguese), ISA: Instituto Socioambiental
- Leitão dos Reis, João Rodrigo; Rodríguez Tello, Julio César; Fischer, Christina (2013), "Percepções do turismo em atrativos da APA Caverna do Maroaga, Presidente Figueiredo/AM", Revista Turismo em Análise, 24 (1), USP, ISSN 1984-4867
