= Jatapu River =

Location
- Country: Brazil

Physical characteristics
- Source
  - location: Amazonas, Brazil
- Mouth: Uatumã River
  - coordinates: 2°28′40″S 58°13′40″W
- Length: 400 km (250 mi)

The Jatapu River is a major tributary of the Uatumã River. Situated within the Amazon River basin, it is located in the eastern portion of state of Amazonas in north-western Brazil.

Part of the river basin is protected by the 938,720 hectares (2,319,600 acres) Uatumã Biological Reserve, a strictly protected conservation unit created in 2002.

== See also ==
- List of rivers of Amazonas
