= Uatumã Biological Reserve =

- Reserva Biológica do Uatumã
- IUCN category Ia (strict nature reserve)
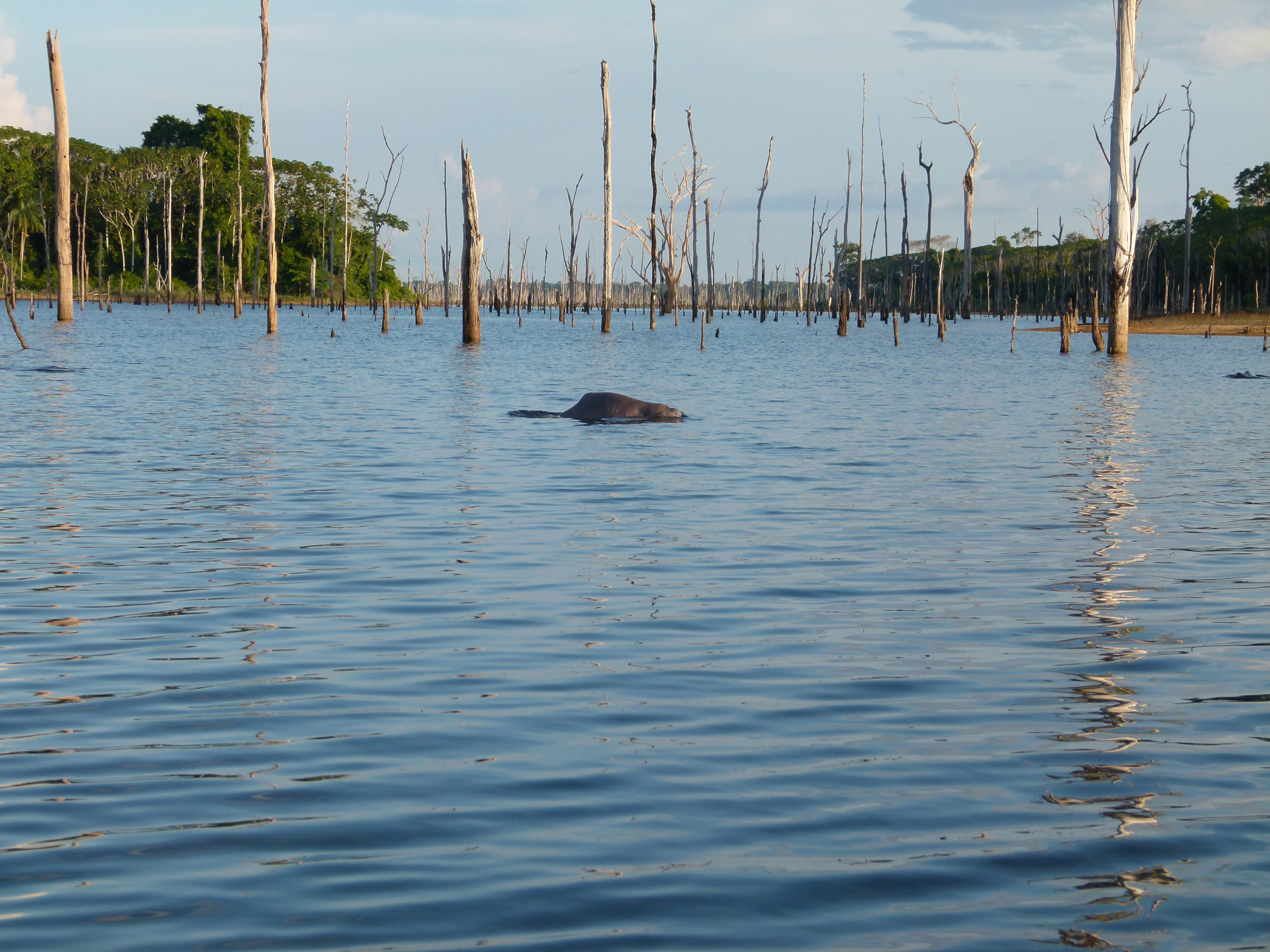

- Location within Brazil
- Nearest city: Manaus, Amazonas
- Coordinates: 1.20°S 59.46°W
- Area: 938,720 hectares (2,319,600 acres)
- Designation: Biological reserve
- Created: 19 September 2002

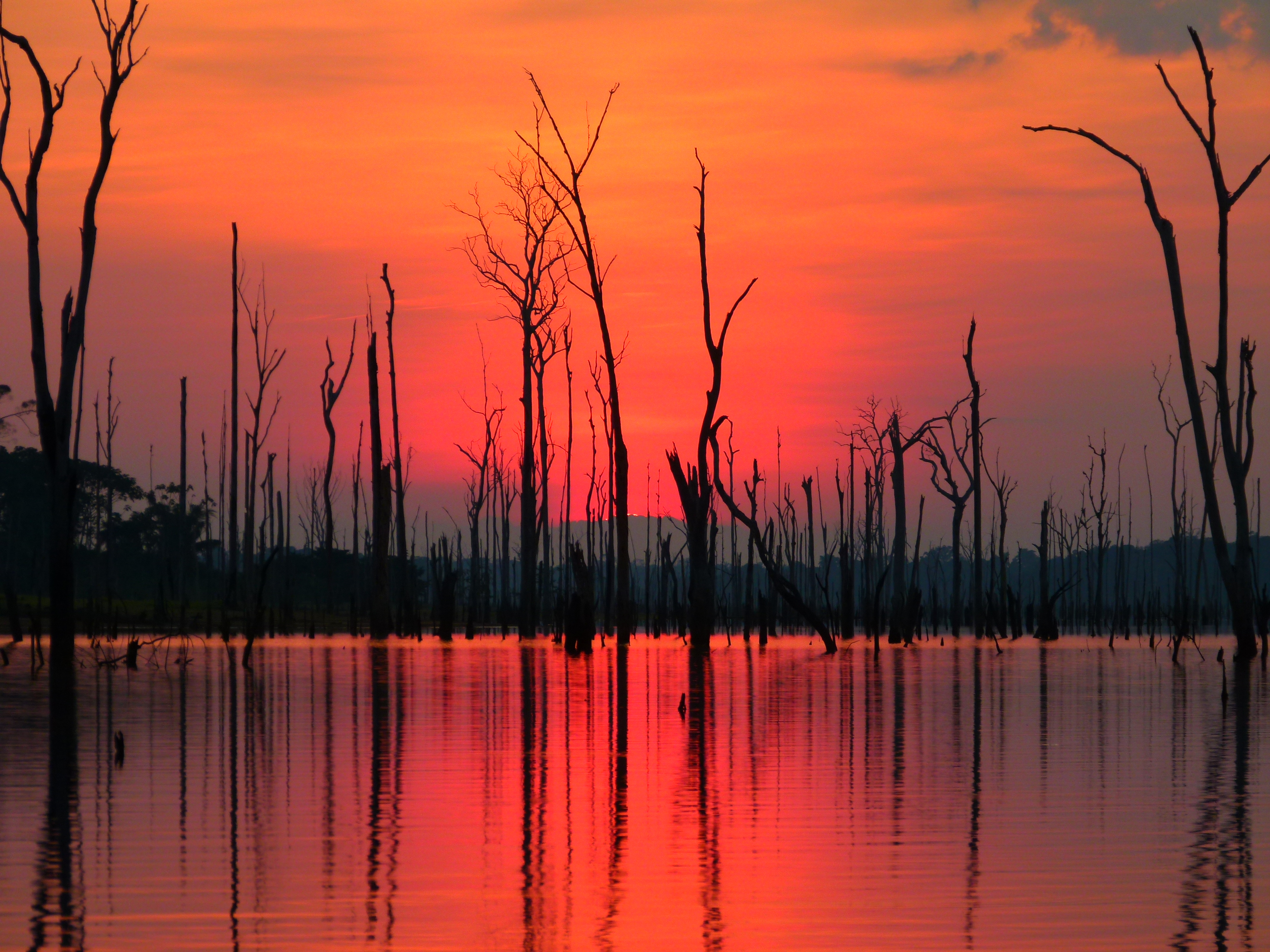
Uatumã Biological Reserve

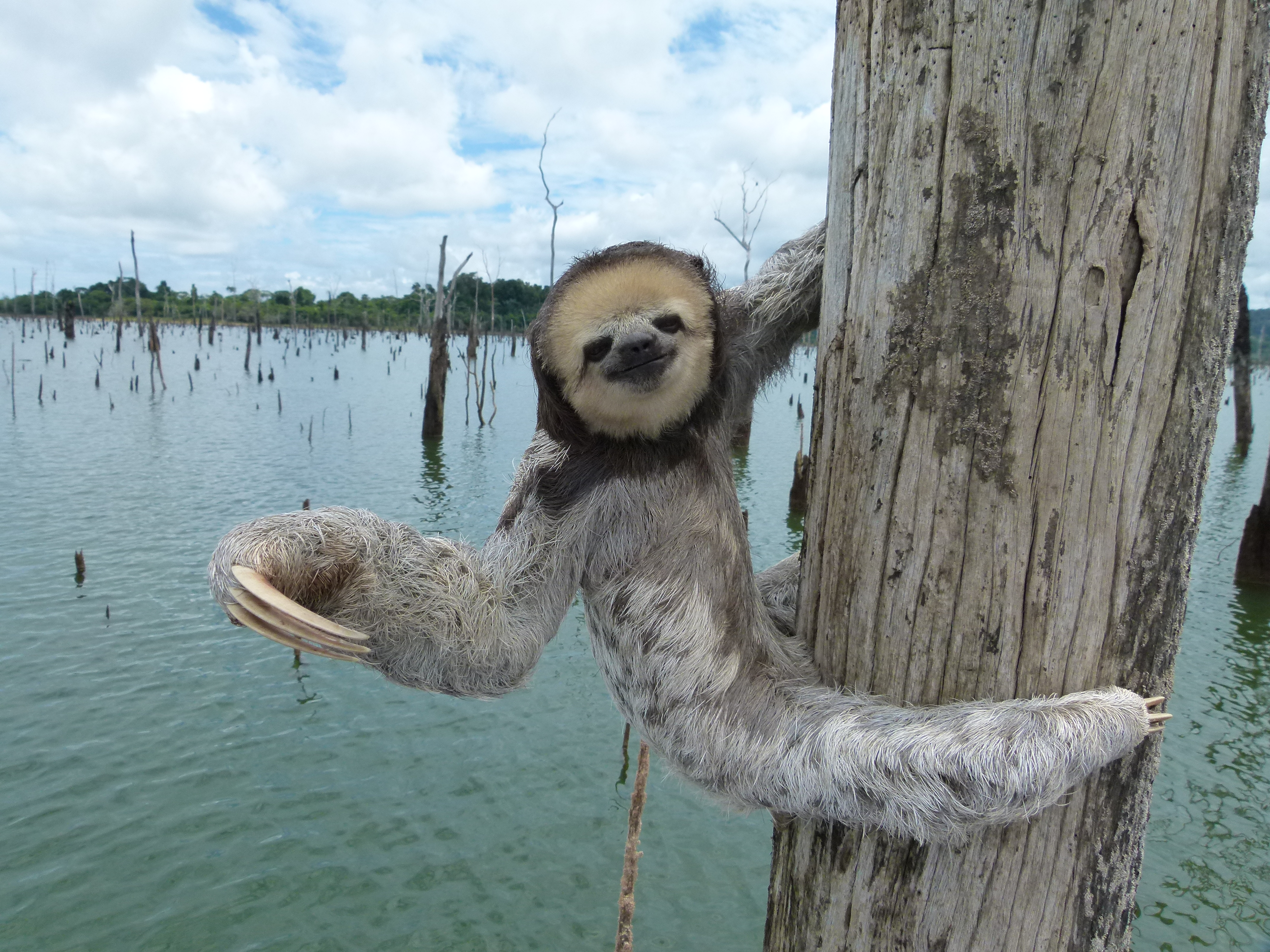
Sloth in the reserve

Uatumã Biological Reserve (Portuguese: Reserva Biológica do Uatumã) is a Biological reserve around the river Uatumã in the state of Amazonas in Brazil.

== Location ==
The Uatumã Biological Reserve is divided between the municipalities of Urucará (35.55%), São Sebastião do Uatumã (16.56%) and Presidente Figueiredo (47.89%) in Amazonas. It has an area of 940,358 hectares (2,323,680 acres). It lies along the northeast shore of the Balbina Dam reservoir. To the west is adjoins the Waimiri Atroari Indigenous Territory. The Pitinga mine is northwest of the reserve. The Trombetas/Mapuera Indigenous Territory is north and east of the reserve.

== History ==
The reserve was originally established in 1990 in the municipalities of São Sebastião do Uatumã and Itapiranga. It covered 560,000 hectares (2,200 sq mi). It became part of the Central Amazon Ecological Corridor, established in 2002. The reserve was expanded by decree on 19 September 2002. The advisory council was created on 23 July 2008. It is administered by the Chico Mendes Institute for Biodiversity Conservation.

== Conservation ==
The Biological Reserve is a "strict nature reserve" under IUCN protected area category Ia. The purpose is to preserve the biological diversity of the dense rainforest ecosystem in the basin of the Uatumã River and Jatapu River, and the lake and island ecosystems formed by the Balbina Dam on the Uatumã, and to protect endemic, rare, vulnerable or endangered species. The conservation unit is supported by the Amazon Region Protected Areas Program. Protected species in the reserve include the sponge anheteromeyenia ornata and the amazonian manatee (trichechus inunguis).

== Sources ==
- CEC Central da Amazônia (in Portuguese), ISA: Instituto Socioambiental
- Full list: PAs supported by ARPA, ARPA
- REBIO do Uatumã (in Portuguese), ISA: Instituto Socioambiental
- Reserva Biológica de Uatumã (in Portuguese), Chico Mendes Institute for Biodiversity Conservation, archived from the original on 2016-06-11
- Uatumã Reserve, IDESAM, 2010, archived from the original on 23 March 2012
- Unidade de Conservação: Reserva Biológica do Uatumã (in Portuguese), MMA: Ministério do Meio Ambiente
- World Conservation Monitoring Centre (1992), "Annex", Protected areas of the world, 4th World Congress on National Protected Areas, Caracas, Venezuela, 10–21 February 1992, Gland [u.a.]: IUCN, ISBN 978-2-8317-0093-9
