= Presidente Figueiredo =

Municipality of Amazonas, Brazil

- Municipality
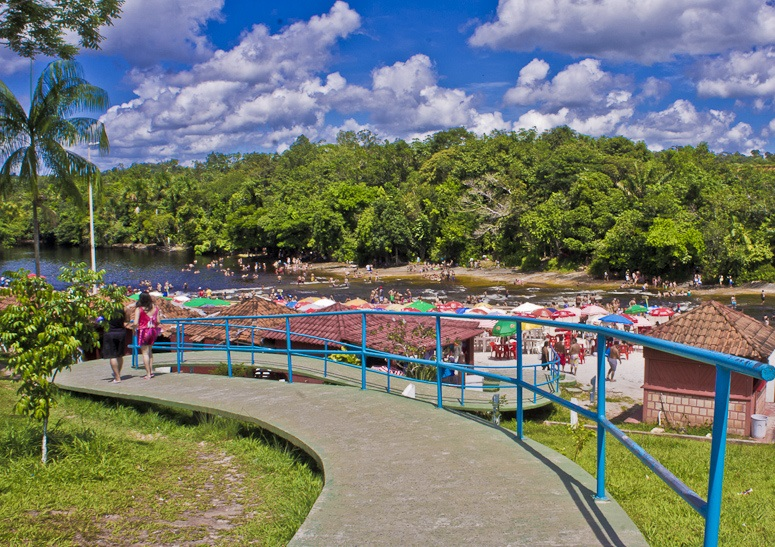

- Flag
- Nickname: "Terra das Cachoeiras" (Land of the Waterfalls)
- Location of the municipality inside Amazonas
- Coordinates: 2°1′2″S 60°1′30″W
- Country: Brazil
- Region: North
- State: Amazonas
- Founded: December 10, 1985

Government
  - Mayor: Romeiro Mendonça

Area
  - Total: 25,422 km^{2} (9,815 sq mi)
- Elevation: 122 m (400 ft)

Population (2020)
  - Total: 37,193
- Time zone: UTC−4 (AMT)
- Website: Town hall of Presidente Figueiredo, AM

Presidente Figueiredo is a municipality located in the Brazilian state of Amazonas. Its population was 37,193 (2020) and its area is 25,422 km^{2}.

== History ==
The name of the municipality honors João Batista de Figueiredo Tenreiro Aranha, the first president of the province of Amazonas at the time of the empire.

The origins of the municipality are mainly related to Novo Airão and Itapiranga, since most of the territory that today is President Figueiredo was dismembered, as well as Manaus, whose neighborhood was an influential factor in the development of the region. The first settlements in these poles date from 1657, to the place where today is the municipality of Manaus, and in 1668, the place today is the headquarters of Novo Airão.

It was from these nuclei that the consolidation and expansion of the settlement of the Baixo Rio Negro took place. Integrated in the municipality of Manaus, Novo Airão became a capital district in 1938, then with the name simply Airão. It is in 1955 that the dismemberment of Manaus takes place, being constituted the Autonomous municipality of Novo Airão. In parallel, in 1952 was created the municipality of Itapiranga, counting in its area with the current village of Balbina.

On December 10, 1981, by Constitutional Amendment No. 12, the municipality of Presidente Figueiredo was created, with territories dismembered from Novo Airão (its eastern border bordering Manaus) and Itapiranga (Vila and surroundings of Balbina), as well adjacent areas of Silves and Urucará. The installation of the municipality took place with the general elections of 1982 and consequently with the possession of the mayor and councilors in January 1983.

== Geography ==
The municipality contains the 374,700-hectare (926,000-acre) Caverna do Maroaga Environmental Protection Area, established in 1990. It contains part of the 938,720-hectare (2,319,600-acre) Uatumã Biological Reserve, a strictly protected conservation unit created in 2002. It also holds about 2% of the Rio Negro Left Bank Environmental Protection Area, a 611,008-hectare (1,509,830-acre) sustainable use conservation area created in 1995.

== Infrastructure ==
=== Health ===
In 2009, Presidente Figueiredo had 22 health facilities among hospitals, emergency rooms, health centers and dental services. Of these, 20 were public and only 2 were private. Among public health facilities, all were owned by the municipal network. In total there were 39 beds for hospitalization in that year.
