= São Sebastião do Uatumã =

Municipality of Amazonas, Brazil

- Municipality
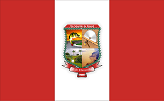
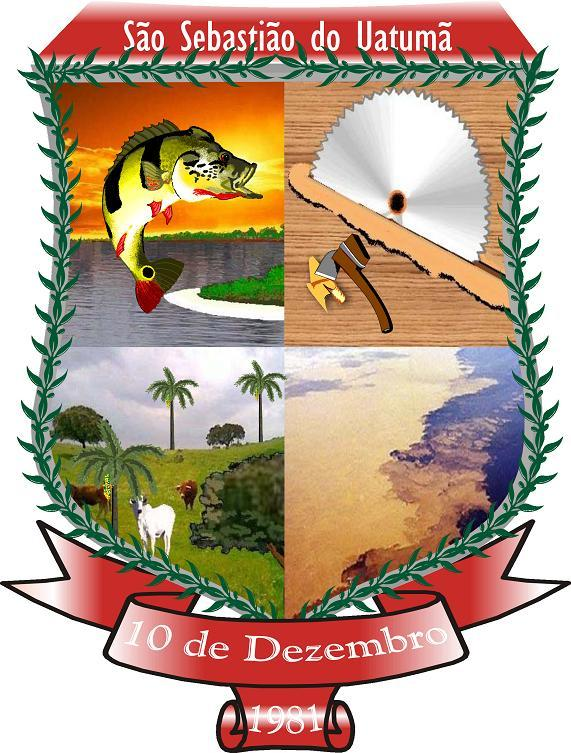
- Flag Coat of arms

- Location of the municipality inside Amazonas
- Coordinates: 2°34′19″S 57°52′15″W
- Country: Brazil
- Region: North
- State: Amazonas

Population (2020)
  - Total: 14,352
- Time zone: UTC−4 (AMT)

São Sebastião do Uatumã is a municipality located in the Brazilian state of Amazonas. Its population was 14,352 (2020) and its area is 10,741 km^{2}.

== Geography ==
The municipality contains part of the 938,720-hectare (2,319,600-acre) Uatumã Biological Reserve, a strictly protected conservation unit created in 2002. It contains about 60% of the 424,430-hectare (1,048,800-acre) Uatumã Sustainable Development Reserve, which protects the lower part of the Uatumã River basin.
