= Itacoatiara Airport =

Airport in Brazil

Mariano Arico Barros Airport Aeroporto Mariano Arico Barros
- IATA: none; ICAO: SBIC; LID: AM0012

Summary
- Airport type: Public
- Serves: Itacoatiara
- Opened: 24 June 1988; 38 years ago
- Time zone: BRT−1 (UTC−04:00)
- Elevation AMSL: 43 m / 141 ft
- Coordinates: 03°07′35″S 058°28′54″W

Map
- Location in Brazil

Runways
Direction	Length		Surface
Direction	m	ft	Surface
14/32	1,520	4,988	Asphalt
- Sources: ANAC, DECEA

Mariano Arico Barros Airport (ICAO: SBIC) is the airport serving Itacoatiara, Brazil.

== Airlines and destinations ==
No scheduled flights operate at this airport.

== Access ==
The airport is located 8 km (5 mi) from downtown Itacoatiara.

== See also ==
- List of airports in Brazil
