= Manaus Energia =

Brazilian energy company

- Company type: Sociedade Anônima
- Industry: Electricity
- Headquarters: Manaus, Brazil
- Products: Electrical power

Manaus Energia is a Brazilian energy company operating in the Manaus area of Amazonas state. The company has its headquarters in Manaus.
