= Urucará =

Municipality of Amazonas, Brazil

- Municipality
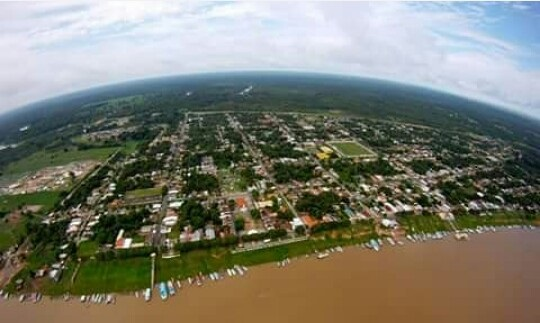
- View of Urucará

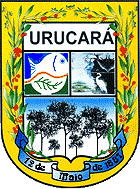
- Coat of arms

- Location of the municipality inside Amazonas

- Location in Brazil
- Coordinates: 2°32′9″S 57°45′36″W
- Country: Brazil
- Region: North
- State: Amazonas

Population (2020)
  - Total: 16,130
- Time zone: UTC−4 (AMT)

Urucará is a municipality in the Brazilian state of Amazonas. Its population was 16,130 (2020) and its area is 27,905 km^{2}.

The municipality contains part of the 938,720-hectare (2,319,600-acre) Uatumã Biological Reserve, a strictly protected conservation unit created in 2002.
