= Itapiranga, Amazonas =

Municipality of Amazonas, Brazil

Itapiranga
- Municipality
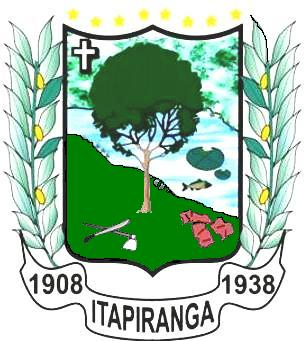
- Coat of arms

- Location of the municipality inside Amazonas
- Coordinates: 2°44′56″S 58°1′19″W
- Country: Brazil
- Region: North
- State: Amazonas

Area
  - Total: 4,231 km^{2} (1,634 sq mi)

Population (2020)
  - Total: 9,230
  - Density: 2/km^{2} (5.2/sq mi)
- Time zone: UTC−4 (BRT)
  - Summer (DST): UTC−4 (DST no longer used)

Itapiranga is a municipality located in the state of Amazonas northern Brazil on the left bank of the Solimões River about 200 km east of Manaus. Its population was 9,230 (2020) and its area is 4,231 km^{2}.

== Name ==
The name is of American Indian origin, and was given to a quarry which has a port. It comes from ita, stone and pitanga, red, so the name means "red stone".

== Geography ==
The municipality contains about 40% of the 424,430-hectare (1,048,800-acre) Uatumã Sustainable Development Reserve, which protects the lower part of the Uatumã River basin.

== History ==
It was founded in 1931 as a suburb of Silves.
