= Tucuruí Dam =

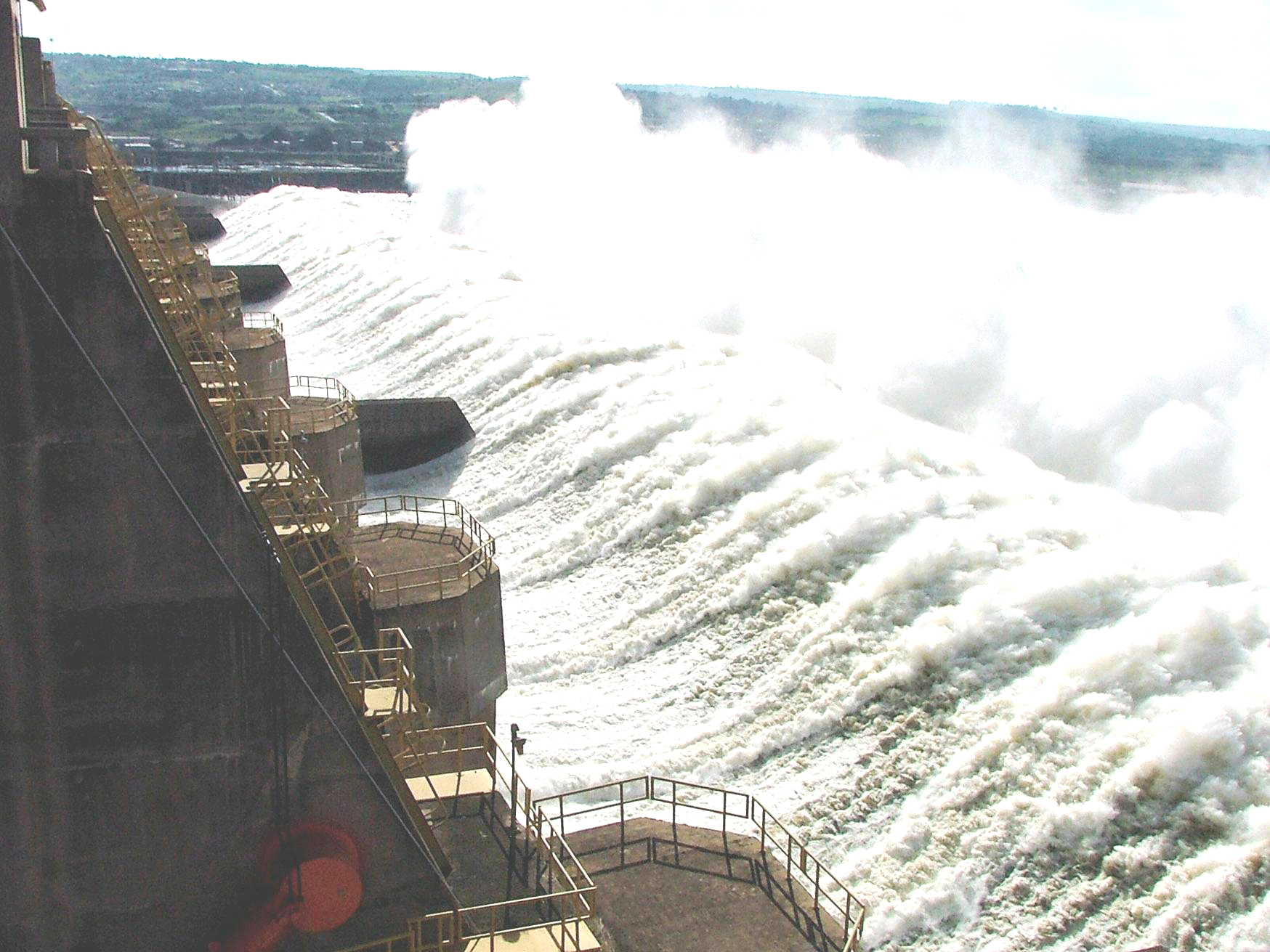

- Location within Brazil
- Interactive map of Tucuruí Dam
- Official name: Usina Hidrelétrica de Tucuruí
- Location: Tucuruí, Pará, Brazil
- Coordinates: 03°49′54″S 49°38′48″W
- Construction began: 1975
- Opening date: 1984
- Construction cost: $5.5 billion, $7.5 with accrued interest
- Operator: Eletronorte

Dam and spillways
- Type of dam: Concrete gravity
- Impounds: Tocantins River
- Height: 78 m (256 ft)
- Length: 12.5 km (7.8 mi); Main dam:6.9 km (4 mi)
- Spillway type: Service, Creager-type, gate-controlled
- Spillway capacity: 110,000 m^{3}/s (3,900,000 cu ft/s)

Reservoir
- Creates: Lago Tucuruí
- Total capacity: 45 km^{3} (36,000,000 acre⋅ft)
- Catchment area: 758,000 km^{2} (293,000 sq mi)
- Surface area: 2,850 km^{2} (1,100 sq mi)
- Maximum water depth: 72 m (236 ft)

Power Station
- Turbines: 25; 12 x 350 MW (470,000 hp); 11 x 375 MW (503,000 hp); 2 x 22.5 MW (30,200 hp)
- Installed capacity: 8,370 MW (11,220,000 hp)
- Annual generation: 21.4 TWh (77 PJ)

The Tucuruí Dam (Tucuruí means "grasshopper's water", translated from Tupí language; Portuguese: Tucuruí) is a concrete gravity dam on the Tocantins River located on the Tucuruí County in the State of Pará, Brazil. The main purpose of the dam is hydroelectric power production and navigation. It is the first large-scale hydroelectric project in the Brazilian Amazon rainforest. The installed capacity of the 25-unit plant is 8,370 megawatts (11,220,000 hp). Phase I construction began in 1980 and ended in 1984 while Phase II began in 1998 and ended in 2010. The dam was featured in the 1985 film The Emerald Forest.

== Background and history ==
The initial reconnaissance of the Tocantins River was carried out by the U.S. Bureau of Reclamation and USAID in 1964. The Amazon Energy Studies Coordination Committee was formed in 1968 and begin hydroelectric project studies in 1969. Before the committee closed, Eletrobrás commissioned further studies, called the "Tocantins Studies", on the entire Tocantins River Basin. In 1973, Brazilian President Emílio Médici was asked to assign funding for a dam on the Tocantins. Two options were available: the Tucuruí Dam and Santo Antonio Dam (unrelated to the Santo Antonio Dam on the Madeira River). In 1973, the Engevix-Ecotec consortium carried out feasibility studies and the Santo Antonio Dam was ruled out in 1974. Later in 1974, the Tucuruí Dam was approved during the President Ernesto Geisel administration.

The dam was built primarily as a source of hydroelectricity and second for navigation between the upper and lower Tocantins River. The electricity was and is primarily supplied to industrial interests from the aluminum industry like Brazil's Companhia Vale do Rio Doce. Communities in Northeast Brazil would also benefit as well, such as Belém, São Luiz, Marabá, and later Eastern Amazonia. The World Bank refused to fund the dam and most of the funding was procured by Eletronorte and Brazilian institutions such as Eletrobrás, BNH, Banco do Brasil, Caixa Econômica Federal and FINAME. A smaller portion of funding came from Canadian, European and American institutions. In 1975, the consortium formed by the Brazilian companies Engevix and Themag were hired to draw up the basic and executive designs. In 1976, Camargo Correa won the bid to construct the dam.

== Construction ==
=== Phase I ===
Construction on Phase I began on November 24, 1975. Phase I called for the construction of the main dam, its dikes, the power house, spillway and upper portion of the navigation locks. On February 1, 1977, concrete-pouring began on site and in September 1978, the river diversion began. On September 6, 1984, the reservoir began filling and 206-days later it was at normal pool. Construction was completed 3 years behind schedule on November 10, 1984. The navigation lock that is part of the dam's design was only partially completed during Phase I with only the upper portion. The construction costs were predicted to be $3.6 billion but rose to over 5.5 billion by construction's end. Including interest during construction, the total cost for Phase I was $7.5 billion. Until 1999, Phase I produced an average of 21,428 terawatt-hours (77,140 PJ) of electricity per year.

=== Phase II ===
Construction on the $1.35 billion Phase II began in June 1998. This phase called for the construction of the new power house for 11 x 375 MW (503,000 hp) Francis turbines and the completion of the navigation lock-system. The new power house is located to the left of the old one and the locks are on the north side of the dam's abutments. Phase II was expected to be completed in 2006 but is behind schedule. The second power house was completed in April 2007 but construction on the navigation locks is behind schedule.

== Stakeholders ==
=== Eletrobras ===
Eletrobras is a Brazilian hydroelectric power company based in Rio de Janeiro. The 52% state owned electrical company generates enough energy to support about one third of Brazil's annual energy consumption.

=== Anti-Dam Activists ===
Protests to the dam's construction and continued operation have been rampant since the project was announced. While anti-dam protests result from a plethora of concerns, the chief concern of activists in this case was the displacement of individuals as a result of the dam's construction and operation. The Tucuruí Dam has displaced 32,000 people, completely wiping out some communities. The dam's most infamous protester, Dilma Ferreira Silva, was brutally assassinated on March 22, 2019. Her husband and a friend died alongside her. Silva was a staunch protester of tropical damming, working as a regional coordinator for the Movement of Dam-Affected Peoples, and spent much of her time exposing the fact that while hydroelectric power is lauded as a sustainable energy source, the Tucuruí Dam's location meant it was not environmentally friendly.

=== Indigenous Peoples ===
Prior to the Dam's construction, farming and mining, supported by the lands which came to be flooded by the Dam, was the main way of life for peoples like the Parakan, Asurini and ParkatÍjÍ. Before construction of the dam began a study was conducted to analyze the impact the project would have on local communities in which it was determined that 900 tons of the 1,500 tons of fish that these communities relied upon for survival would no longer be accessible. Without agency in Brazilian society, these tribes were reliant upon others to advocate for their needs. This, of course, did not occur.

== Protests ==
=== 2007 Occupation of the Tucuruí Plant ===
In 2007 a series of street demonstration organized by the Movement of Dam Affected People, Movimento dos Trabalhadores Rurais Sem Terra, and Via Campesina resulted in protesters occupying the Tucuruí plant for two days. The occupation resulted in a small win for protesters, as government officials agreed to meet with representatives if the Movement of Dam Affected People to end the protest.

=== Occupation of the Piratininga Ranch ===
In 2007 Movimento dos Trabalhadores Rurais Sem Terra occupied a ranch in Piratininga, São Paulo as a protest to the destruction of lands as a result of the Tucuruí Dam's construction. Through a process referred to as grilagem (translates to land-grabbing from Portuguese), which could be compared to a more violent form of gaining squatters rights in other countries, the protesters were able to occupy the land.

== Ecosystem Services in Connection to the Tucuruí Dam ==
The term ecosystem services refers to he varied benefits an ecological region provides humanity. The construction of the Tucuruí Dam either jeopardized or destroyed a plethora of the ecosystem services the region provided before the hydroelectric dam's construction.

=== Cultural/ Heritage Services ===
Cultural/heritage services are those that contribute to the success of a particular community's culture and way of life. Prior to the dam's construction, multiple indigenous groups' identity was tied to the Tocantins River area in the Brazilian state of Pará which would come to be destroyed by the dam. Since the dam's construction, a number of indigenous reserves, like those of the Parakanã, Pucuruí and Montanha have been flooded and the reserves of the Mãe Maria, Trocará, Krikati and Cana Brava have been cut through by transmission lines.

=== Habitat Services ===
While cultural/heritage services refers to the spaces humans inhabit, habitat services refers to animals. The river was once home to 280 species of fish, but only 178 species remain. Additionally, aquatic mammals, such as manatees, river dolphins, and amazon dolphins which once flourished in the region are not expected to survive spillways and other impacts the dam created, threatening the continued success of these species.

=== Supporting Services ===
Supporting services are one which help stabilize a particular ecosystem. In the wake of the dam's completion the region it inhabits underwent eutrophication, the process of soil becoming too nutrient rich, making it a breeding ground for malaria carrying mosquitos and ideal habitat for excessive aquatic plant life growth as a result.

=== Watershed/ Fresh Water Services ===
The Tocantins watershed was, historically, an important access point for freshwater amongst the humans and animals living in the region. As a result of construction, however, the water quality of the Tocantins River Basin has been jeopardized due to discharge of industrial effluents, residues of agricultural uses, and untreated sewage disposal.

== Dam ==
The main portion Tucuruí Dam is a 78-metre-high (256 ft) and 6.9-kilometre-long (4.3 mi) concrete-gravity dam. The addition of the Mojú and Caraipé earth-fill dikes increases the total length to 12,515 metres (41,060 ft). The main dam's Creager-type service spillway is the second largest in the world with a maximum capacity of 110,000 cubic metres per second (3,900,000 cu ft/s). It is controlled by 20 floodgates measuring 20 by 21 metres (66 ft × 69 ft).

== Reservoir ==
The reservoir impounded by the dam has a capacity of 45 cubic kilometres (36,000,000 acre⋅ft) with a live volume of 32 cubic kilometres (26,000,000 acre⋅ft).

== Power houses ==
The 405 by 58 metres (1,329 ft × 190 ft) Phase I power house is concrete and is fitted with an intake and penstocks. Phase I's power house contains 12 x 350 MW (470,000 hp) Francis turbine generators. An auxiliary water intake and auxiliary powerhouse also houses 2 x 22.5 MW (30,200 hp) generators.

== Locks ==
The dam is designed to support two 210 by 33 metres (689 ft × 108 ft) wide navigation locks.

== Impact ==
The Tucuruí Dam brought power to 13 million people and 60% of the power is transferred to industries which create just under 2,000 jobs. Between 25,000 and 35,000 people were removed from the future reservoir zone in the early 1980s. 14,000 people were relocated by the government. 3,750 of these people moved to new islands created by the reservoir which lack adequate infrastructure. Construction of the dam attracted migrants which, along with the reservoir, significantly increased malaria and AIDS cases. The completion of Phase I in 1984 led to a large amount of unemployment among its 20,000 employees and subsequent migration from the area. The flooded area is in the Tocantins-Araguaia-Maranhão moist forests ecoregion, the most degraded in the Amazon region. The overall large influx of people to the area has led to deforestation and negative impacts from increased cattle-raising. The increases of population have also strained existing infrastructure or lack thereof.

== See also ==
- Energy policy of Brazil
- List of largest hydroelectric power stations
- List of largest power stations in the world
- List of conventional hydroelectric power stations
- List of dam megaprojects
- List of power stations in Brazil

== Bibliography ==
- Rios, Jorge Paes. The flood gates operating instructions of Tucurui Hydroelectric Power Plant. San Francisco, 1986. Les consignes d' opération des vannes de l'Usine Hydroelectrique de Tucurui International Committee on Large Dams.
