= Itacoatiara, Amazonas =

Municipality of Amazonas, Brazil

Itacoatiara
- Municipality
- Município de Itacoatiara; Municipality of Itacoatiara
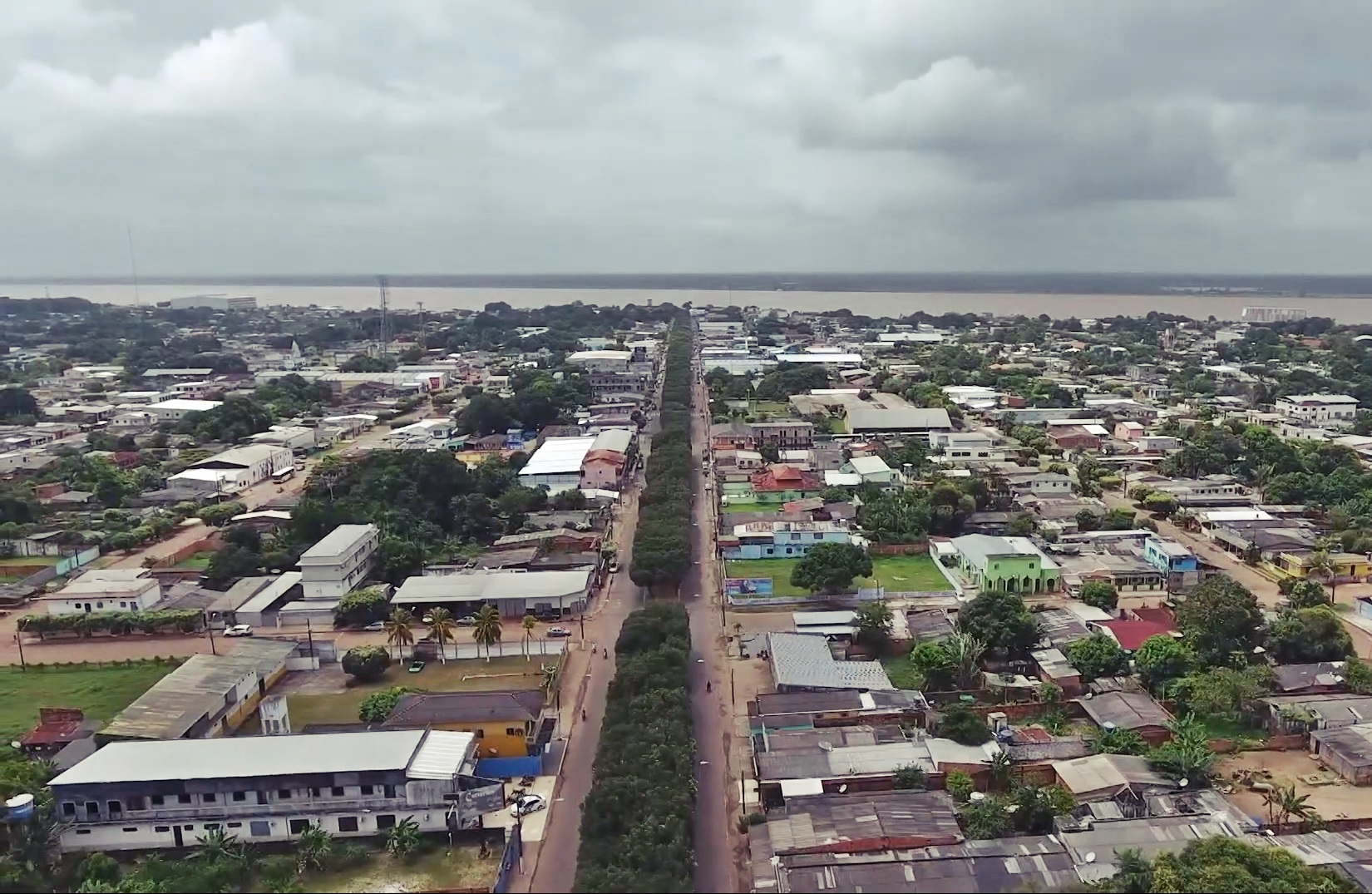
- Itacoatiara, Amazonas, Brazil

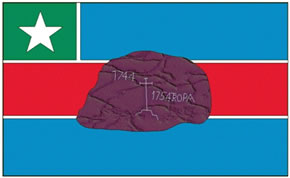
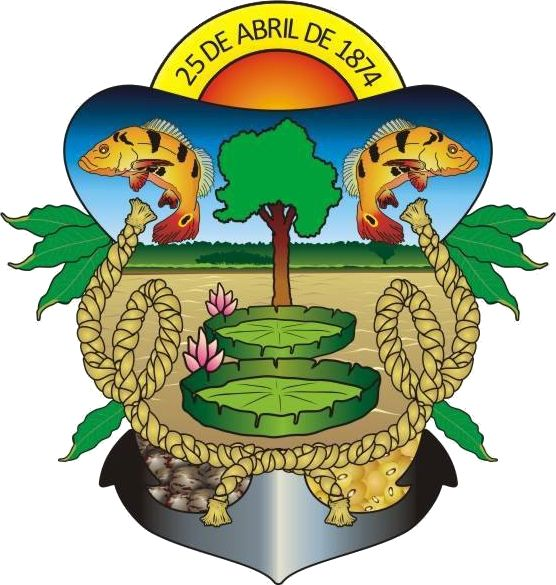
- Flag Coat of arms

- Location in the state of Amazonas

- Location in Brazil
- Coordinates: 03°08′34″S 58°26′38″W
- Country: Brazil
- Region: North
- State: Amazonas
- Founded: April 24, 1874

Government
  - Mayor: Antônio Peixoto de Oliveira (Workers' Party)

Area
  - Total: 8,891.993 km^{2} (3,433.218 sq mi)
- Elevation: 40 m (130 ft)

Population (2022 Census)
  - Total: 103,598
  - Estimate (2025): 113,917
  - Metro density: 10.016/km^{2} (25.94/sq mi)
- Time zone: UTC−4 (AMT)
- Area code: +55 (92)
- Climate: Af

Itacoatiara is a municipality in the central eastern portion of state of Amazonas, inland northern Brazil.

Its population was 103,598 (2022 Census) and its area is 8,600 km^{2}.

The town is known as "City of painted stone" - which is its name translated from Tupi. Itacoatiara has an important port, which is responsible for a considerable amount of cargo transportation in Amazonas.

Its Catedral Prelatícia Nossa Senhora do Rosário, dedicated to Our Lady of the Rosary, is the episcopal see of the pre-diocesan Roman Catholic Territorial Prelature of Itacoatiara.

== History ==
In 1655, an aldeia (hamlet) named Arroquis, on Albi Island on the Madeira River, was founded by Portuguese Jesuit missionary António Vieira. It was thereafter moved four times due to aggression by the indigenous Mura people.

In 1757, the inhabitants of aldeia Abacaxi (where did the inhabitants of Arroquis go?) moved to the left bank of the Amazon River, where Itacoatiara is now located.

In 1758, Francisco Xavier de Mendonça passed through the region for the second time in order to found the captaincy of São José do Rio Negro.

In 1759, the aldeia was elevated to the category of village, and was then called Serpa.

Itacoatiara became an actual town by law 74 of December 10, 1857, but in 1858 it was once more demoted as village, named Nossa Senhora do Rosário de Serpa. Finally, on April 25, 1874, by law 283, Itacoatiara was again elevated to the category of town, with its current name.

== Demography ==
=== Ethnic composition ===
Itacoatiara is marked by the cultural, political and economic traits inherited from the Portuguese, Spanish and Dutch settlers. The city grew that way, but going back a bit in history, one can not forget the importance of Amerindians in the ethnic contribution. It was the Amerindians who began human occupation in the Amazon, and their descendants, the caboclos, developed in intimate contact with the environment, adapting to the regional peculiarities and opportunities offered by the forest.

In historical formation, Itacoatiara's demography is the result of the miscegenation of the three basic ethnic groups that compose the Brazilian population: Native Brazilian, European and African, thus forming the region's mestizos (caboclos). Later on, with the arrival of the immigrants, especially Japanese, Arabs, Syrians, Lebanese and Jews coming mostly from Morocco, a unique culture was formed that characterizes the population of the city, its values and way of life.

According to the IBGE 2000 census, the population of Itacoatiara is composed of: Pardo (58.37% or 41.367 inhabitants), White (32.21% or 22.504 inhabitants), Black (5.7% or 4 110 inhabitants), Amerindians (3.09% or 2,228 inhabitants) and Yellow (0.63% or 430 inhabitants). There are also 50 people who did not declare their ethnicity, representing 0.10% of the total population.

== Geography ==
The town is located 176 km east by air or 270 km downstream by river from Manaus. It is the third most populous town in the state, on the bank of the Amazon River.

=== Climate ===
Climate data for Itacoatiara (1991–2020 normals, extremes 1971–present)
Month	Jan	Feb	Mar	Apr	May	Jun	Jul	Aug	Sep	Oct	Nov	Dec	Year
Record high °C (°F)	36.0 (96.8)	36.2 (97.2)	36.5 (97.7)	37.0 (98.6)	36.1 (97.0)	36.0 (96.8)	37.9 (100.2)	36.8 (98.2)	37.8 (100.0)	38.8 (101.8)	37.6 (99.7)	38.6 (101.5)	38.8 (101.8)
Mean daily maximum °C (°F)	31.4 (88.5)	31.1 (88.0)	31.1 (88.0)	31.2 (88.2)	31.6 (88.9)	32.1 (89.8)	32.6 (90.7)	33.4 (92.1)	34.1 (93.4)	34.0 (93.2)	33.2 (91.8)	32.2 (90.0)	32.3 (90.1)
Daily mean °C (°F)	26.5 (79.7)	26.5 (79.7)	26.7 (80.1)	26.8 (80.2)	27.1 (80.8)	27.2 (81.0)	27.3 (81.1)	27.8 (82.0)	28.5 (83.3)	28.4 (83.1)	28.0 (82.4)	27.3 (81.1)	27.3 (81.1)
Mean daily minimum °C (°F)	23.4 (74.1)	23.4 (74.1)	23.2 (73.8)	23.5 (74.3)	23.7 (74.7)	23.6 (74.5)	23.4 (74.1)	23.7 (74.7)	24.0 (75.2)	24.1 (75.4)	24.0 (75.2)	23.8 (74.8)	23.7 (74.7)
Record low °C (°F)	18.9 (66.0)	18.8 (65.8)	18.0 (64.4)	17.5 (63.5)	19.8 (67.6)	19.0 (66.2)	16.9 (62.4)	18.4 (65.1)	18.3 (64.9)	19.2 (66.6)	18.5 (65.3)	18.8 (65.8)	16.9 (62.4)
Average precipitation mm (inches)	317.4 (12.50)	316.6 (12.46)	418.0 (16.46)	334.8 (13.18)	266.4 (10.49)	159.3 (6.27)	99.5 (3.92)	74.0 (2.91)	72.6 (2.86)	114.2 (4.50)	130.3 (5.13)	240.7 (9.48)	2,543.8 (100.15)
Average precipitation days (≥ 1.0 mm)	18	17	21	19	18	13	10	7	7	7	8	13	158
Average relative humidity (%)	86.4	86.1	86.5	86.7	86.1	83.6	81.7	79.3	77.9	78.1	80.7	83.5	83.1
Mean monthly sunshine hours	125.7	100.9	105.4	116.3	141.1	177.9	211.4	223.3	206.4	195.2	153.9	146.1	1,903.6
Source 1: Instituto Nacional de Meteorologia
Source 2: Meteo Climat (record highs and lows)

== Transportation ==
The city is served by Mariano Arico Barros Airport.

== Notable people ==
- Mayra Dias, Brazilian model and Miss Brazil 2018

== See also ==
- Silves another old town, originally a mission, nearby
