= Uatumã River =

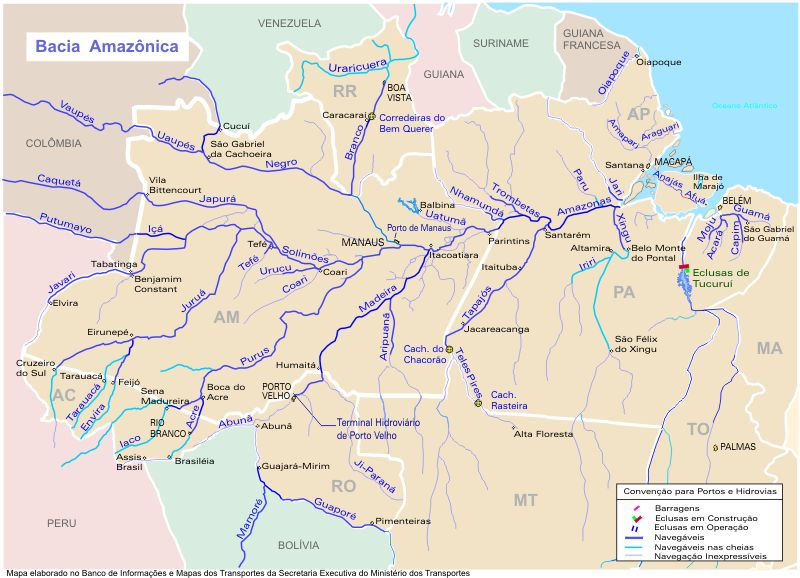
- Location of the mouth of the Uatumã River in the Amazon river watershed

Location
- Country: Brazil

Physical characteristics
- Source
  - location: Amazonas, Brazil
- Mouth: Amazon River
  - coordinates: 2°24′55″S 57°34′38″W
- Length: 660 km (410 mi)
- Discharge
  - average: 2,200 m^{3}/s (78,000 cu ft/s)

The Uatumã River (sometimes spelled Uatamã) is a river flowing through the state of Amazonas in Brazil. It is a northern tributary of the Amazon River, and known for its extensive peacock bass population. It is a blackwater river.

The river flows through the Uatuma-Trombetas moist forests ecoregion. During the wet season starting in December, water levels can rise some 25 to 40 feet. Water levels have been strongly affected by the building of the controversial Balbina Dam on the river in the mid to late 1980s to generate electricity. The hydroelectric dam generates an average of 112.2 MW of electricity from the river system and floods a total of 2360 km^{2} of rainforest around the Uatumã river.

From the point where the river emerges from the dam it defines the east boundary of the 374,700 hectares (926,000 acres) Caverna do Maroaga Environmental Protection Area, established in 1990. The Uatumã Biological Reserve established in 1990 is a nature reserve around the river in the municipalities of São Sebastião do Uatumã and Itapiranga. The 424,430 hectares (1,048,800 acres) Uatumã Sustainable Development Reserve protects the lower part of the Uatumã River basin.
