= Silves, Amazonas =

Municipality of Amazonas, Brazil

Silves
- Municipality
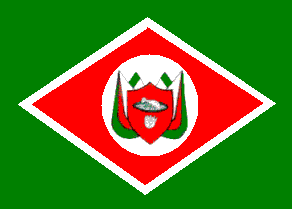
- Flag Coat of arms

- Location of the municipality inside Amazonas

- Location in Brazil
- Coordinates: 2°50′20″S 58°12′33″W
- Country: Brazil
- Region: North
- State: Amazonas

Area
  - Total: 3,749 km^{2} (1,447 sq mi)

Population (2020)
  - Total: 9,230
  - Density: 2.4/km^{2} (6.2/sq mi)
- Time zone: UTC−4 (AMT)
- Climate: Af

Silves or Ilha de Silves is an island municipality in the state of Amazonas, northern Brazil. It is located 10 km straight line north or about 40 km by water from the Amazon River, 200 kilometres (120 mi) east of Manaus (almost halfway between that city and the Amazonas-Pará state border). Its population was 9,230 (2020) and its area is 3,749 square kilometres (1,447 mi^{2}).

== History ==
Silves is one of the oldest municipalities in the state of Amazonas. It was established in 1660 (some sources say 1663) as a Jesuit Indian mission, the aldea of Santa Cruz. It was abandoned a year later when Jesuits were evicted from the area for failure to cooperate with Portuguese slave raiders. In 1685, it was reestablished by Mercedarian Theodozio da Viega at the same site and known by the name of aldea de Saracá (named for the lake). Two more villages were founded by Mercedarian missionaries on Rio Urubu and had the names of São Pedro Nolasco and São Raimundo. They disappeared shortly after founding. In 1759, the aldea of Saracá was elevated to a village with the name Silves, after civil parish of Silves, Portugal.

== See also ==
- Itacoatiara, another old mission town nearby
