= Japurá–Solimões–Negro moist forests =

Ecoregion in the Amazon Biome

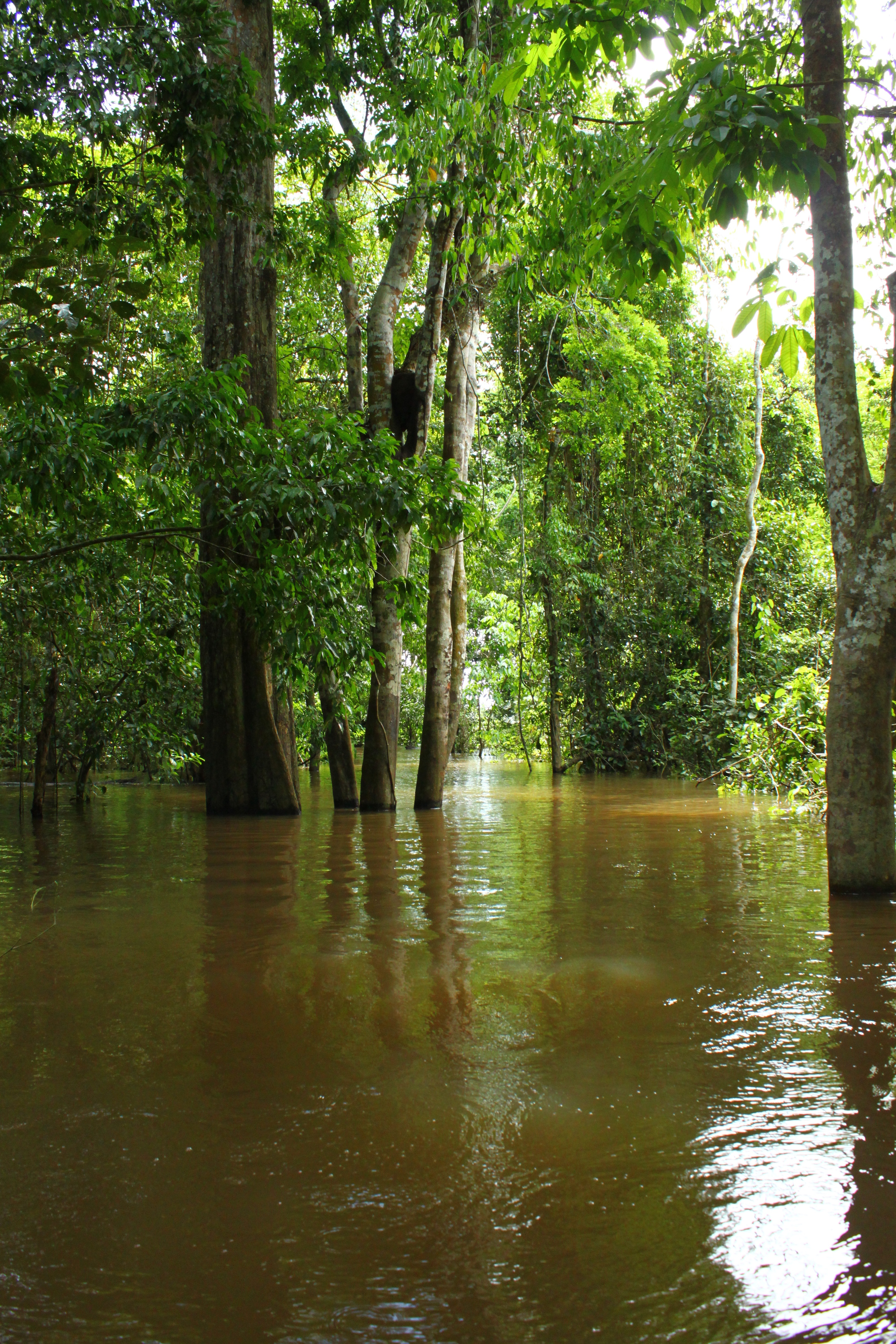
- Flooded forest in the Jaú National Park

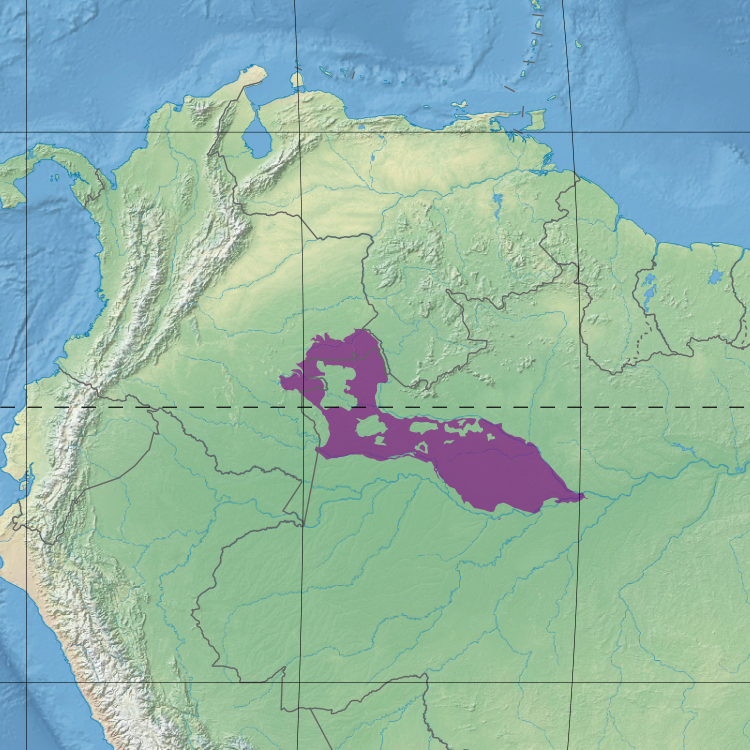
- Ecoregion territory (in purple)

Ecology
- Realm: Neotropical
- Biome: Tropical and subtropical moist broadleaf forests – Amazon
- Bird species: 506
- Mammal species: 181

Geography
- Area: 269,617.76 km^{2} (104,100.00 sq mi)
- Countries: Brazil, Colombia, Venezuela
- Coordinates: 1.759°S 64.764°W
- Geology: Amazon Basin
- Rivers: Japurá, Solimões, Rio Negro

The Japurá–Solimões–Negro moist forests (NT0132) is an ecoregion of tropical moist broad leaf forest in the Amazon biome.

== Location ==
The Japurá–Solimoes–Negro moist forests ecoregion is named for the Japurá, Solimões, and Negro rivers. Almost all of the ecoregion is in the central northern part of the Brazilian Amazon basin, with a small portion in Colombia. It has an area of 26,961,776 hectares (66,624,000 acres). Conservation units include the Jaú National Park and the Mamirauá Sustainable Development Reserve.

The ecoregion lies on the lowland plateau in the interfluvial between the Rio Negro and the Solimões River. In Colombia the region skirts the foothills of the Guiana Shield to the northwest, and contains the lower Vaupés River basin and the land south of the Guainía River, the name of the upper Rio Negro in Colombia. The region is then bounded by the Rio Negro along the border with Venezuela and into Brazil to its confluence with the Solimões at Manaus. The southern border is defined by the Japurá River from the border with Colombia to the point where it meets the Solimões at Tefé, then by the Solimões to the Rio Negro.

The Japurá–Solimoes–Negro moist forests adjoin the Caquetá moist forests to the west, and the Negro–Branco moist forests to the north. To the east it adjoins the Uatuma–Trombetas moist forests. To the south it adjoins the Monte Alegre várzea, Purus várzea, and Solimões–Japurá moist forests. The ecoregion contains large areas of the distinct campinarana ecoregion, which has white sand soils that are periodically subject to shallow flooding, and hold broad-leaf meadows, dwarf shrubs and shrublands.

== Physical ==
=== Terrain ===
The lowland plateau that holds the Japurá–Solimoes–Negro moist forests ecoregion emerged as soft sediments about 2.5 million years ago. The terrain is mainly non-flooded terra firme on wide plains cut by steep-sided valleys of tributaries of the larger rivers. The region has elevations that are mostly well below 80 metres (260 ft), dropping to 23 metres (75 ft) at Manaus.

=== Hydrology ===
The Japurá and Solimões are whitewater rivers, carrying large amounts of suspended solids, while the Rio Negro and most of the smaller rivers in the region are blackwater rivers. Each year heavy rainfall within the ecoregion and higher up in the Andes causes flooding along the banks of all the larger rivers and many of the smaller rivers. Near Tefé and Manaus the flood water may rise 14 metres (46 ft). Flooding lasts for one or two months on the upper reaches of the smaller rivers, but may extend for as much as ten months near Manaus. The wide floodplains of the Japurá and Solimões rivers hold the várzea forests of the Purus várzea ecoregion. The blackwater Rio Negro and rivers of the interior of the ecoregion flood Igapó forests, with lower diversity of tree species and less fertile soil.

=== Climate ===
The Japurá–Solimoes–Negro moist forests ecoregion has a hot and humid climate with average monthly temperature from 26 to 27 °C (79 to 81 °F). Average annual rainfall is 2,500 millimetres (98 in), with a well-defined rainy season.

== Ecology ==
=== Flora ===
The Japurá–Solimoes–Negro moist forests ecoregion has medium endemism, but the holds many rare or endangered flora. The ecoregion is in the Neotropical realm and the tropical and subtropical moist broadleaf forests biome. There are many rivers and flooded areas, but most of the vegetation is terra firme forest, not subject to flooding. The ecoregion is part of the Río Negro-Juruá Moist Forests, a global ecoregion, the other parts being the Negro–Branco, Solimões–Japurá and Caquetá moist forests. The reasonably intact global ecoregion has high annual rainfall, diverse soils and varied terrain, resulting in a high level of biodiversity. It has not been studied in great depth by scientists.

Most of the Japurá–Solimoes–Negro moist forests ecoregion is covered by terra firme forests growing on poor soil. These forests typically have a 25 to 30 metres (82 to 98 ft) canopy, either open or closed with emergent trees up to 40 metres (130 ft). Common families of trees are Fabaceae, Sapotaceae, Rubiaceae, Chrysobalanaceae, Lauraceae and Annonaceae. There are many palms in the understory and canopy of the different types of forest. In the terra firme areas the most common palms are miriti and carana in the genus Mauritia. Other terra firme trees include Brazil nut (Bertholletia excelsa), sucupira (Bowdichia virgilioides) and rubber (Hevea spruceana).

Trees in igapó forests along the Jaú River in the west include Elvasia calophylla, Swartzia laevicarpa, Pouteria elegans, Aldina latifolia, Swartzia polyphylla, Ouratea hexasperma, Mollia speciosa, Leopoldiana pulchra, Inga puntata and Heterostemon mimosoides. Trees along the Tarumã Mirim River to the east include Vismia amazonica, Unonopsis guatterioides, Pentaclethra macroloba, Macrolobium suaveolens, Eschweilera parvifolia, Caraipa grandiflora, Aspidosperma nitidum and Mabea nitida. Timber trees on the upper margins of the várzea include Ceiba pentandra, Manilkara amazonica, and Virola surinamensis.

=== Fauna ===
The Japurá–Solimoes–Negro moist forests contain diverse fauna.

181 species of mammals have been recorded, including South American tapir (Tapirus terrestris), capybara (Hydrochoerus hydrochaeris), jaguar (Panthera onca), collared peccary (Pecari tajacu), red-faced spider monkey (Ateles paniscus), red-handed tamarin (Saguinus midas), common squirrel monkey (Saimiri sciureus), and several gracile capuchin monkeys (Cebus species). There are many small rodents, anteaters, opossums, and over 100 bat species.

506 species of birds have been reported. Common birds include macaws (Ara species), cattle egret (Bubulcus ibis), herons of the Egretta and Ardea genera, tinamous (Crypturellus species) and parrots (Amazona and Piona species).

There are many species of reptiles and amphibians, including the omnipresent green iguana (Iguana iguana) and tegus lizards (Tupinambis species).

Snakes include boa constrictor (Boa constrictor) and the venomous fer-de-lance (Bothrops asper), palm pit-vipers (Bothriechis species), coral snakes (Micrurus species) and bushmasters (Lachesis muta).

The rivers are home to fish of all sizes, turtles, Amazon river dolphin (Inia geoffrensis), and Amazonian manatee (Trichechus inunguis).

=== Status ===
The region holds the south half of the Puinawai Natural Reserve in Colombia. Protected areas in Brazil include the Mamirauá Sustainable Development Reserve in the Purus várzea ecoregion, the Amanã Sustainable Development Reserve and the Jaú National Park. The forest is largely undisturbed and relatively stable, but there are high levels of mining, logging, agriculture, hunting and fishing along the rivers. There are no roads in the region except for very close to Manaus, but the rivers carry much boat traffic. Urban development in the Manaus region causes deforestation and pollution. In the border region between Colombia and Brazil large stretches of river bank are being destroyed by gold miners. There is unregulated logging of timber along the river banks.
