= Purus várzea =

Ecoregion in the Amazon biome

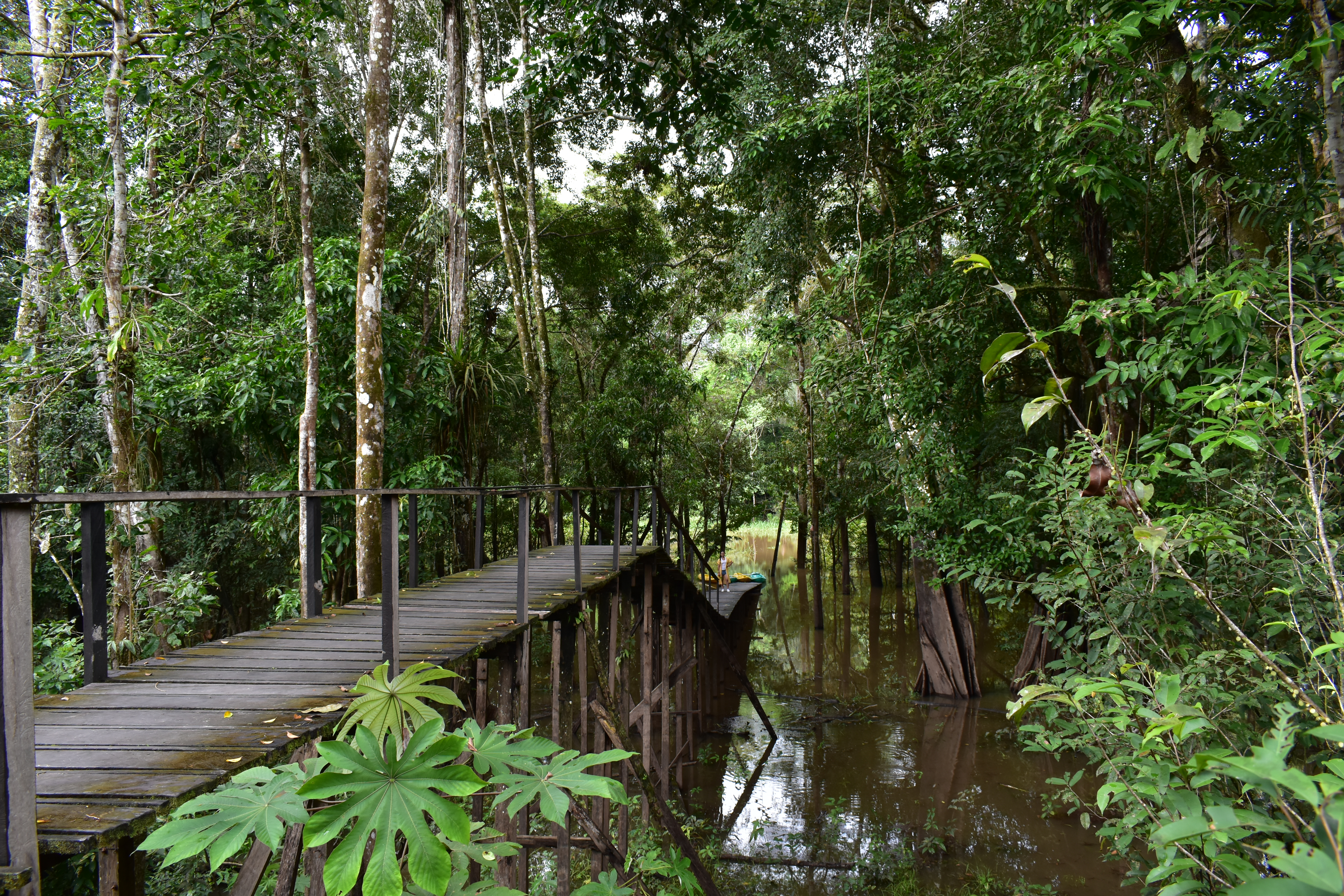
- Wooden bridge traversing seasonally flooded forest near Leticia, Colombia

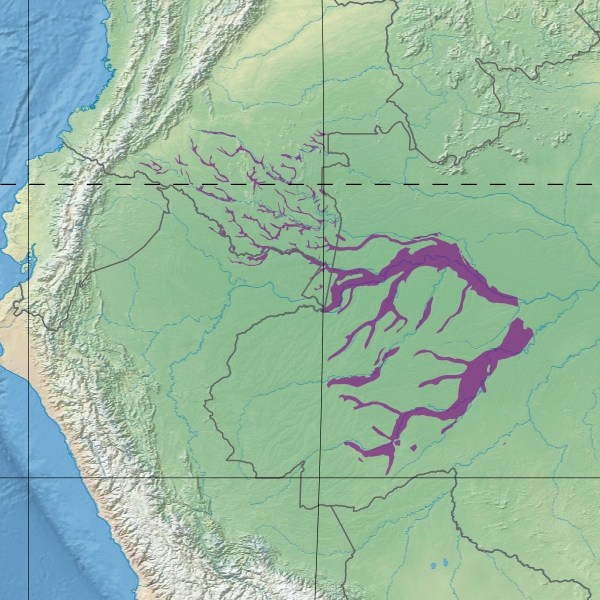
- Ecoregion territory (in purple)

Ecology
- Realm: Neotropical
- Biome: Tropical and subtropical moist broadleaf forests – Amazon

Geography
- Area: 177,414.18 km^{2} (68,500.00 sq mi)
- Countries: Colombia, Brazil
- Coordinates: 2.393°S 66.039°W

The Purus várzea (NT0156) is an ecoregion of seasonally flooded várzea forest in the central Amazon basin. It is part of the Amazon biome. The ecoregion is home to a vegetation adapted to floods of up to 12 metres (39 ft) that may last for eight months. There is a great variety of fish and birds, but relatively fewer mammals. Ground-dwelling mammals must migrate to higher ground during the flood season. Threats include logging, cattle farming, over-fishing and mercury pollution from gold mining.

== Location ==
The Purus várzea is a low-lying region of the central Amazon basin that is seasonally flooded. It covers 17,741,418 hectares (43,840,000 acres) of eastern Colombia and western Brazil. It extends along most of the Juruá, central Purus, and Caquetá (Japurá) rivers and their tributaries. In the east it reaches the confluence of the Japurá and Solimões Rivers. Urban centers in or around the region are Tefé, Tabatinga and Carauarí.

To the southeast the varzea adjoins the Purus–Madeira moist forests, and to the northeast it adjoins the Japurá–Solimões–Negro moist forests. Streams that flow through the Southwest Amazon moist forests, Solimões–Japurá moist forests and Caquetá moist forests to the west, and the Juruá–Purus moist forests in the central region all contain stretches of the varzea. The Monte Alegre várzea is downstream along the Solimões.

== Physical ==
Altitudes range from 80 to 120 metres (260 to 390 ft). The forests are seasonally flooded by whitewater rivers, which carry suspended sediment washed from the eastern slopes of the Andes and organic material. Water levels rise by up to 12 metres (39 ft) in the flood period, which may last for eight months of the year. The soil is fertile, composed of sediments that have accumulated in the present Holocene epoch and that are renewed by the annual floods. The river course through the floodplain constantly shifts over time, creating oxbow lakes, levees, meander swales and bars. These landscape elements support diverse vegetation adapted to flooding, which gradually merges into the surrounding terra firme forest.

== Ecology ==
The ecoregion is in the Neotropical realm and the tropical and subtropical moist broadleaf forests biome.

=== Climate ===
The Köppen climate classification is "Af": equatorial, fully humid. Average temperatures range from 21 to 32 °C (70 to 90 °F), with a mean temperature of 26.5 °C (79.7 °F). Average annual precipitation is about 2,550 millimetres (100 in). Rain falls throughout the year, but is heaviest in January–March and lightest in July–August.

=== Flora ===
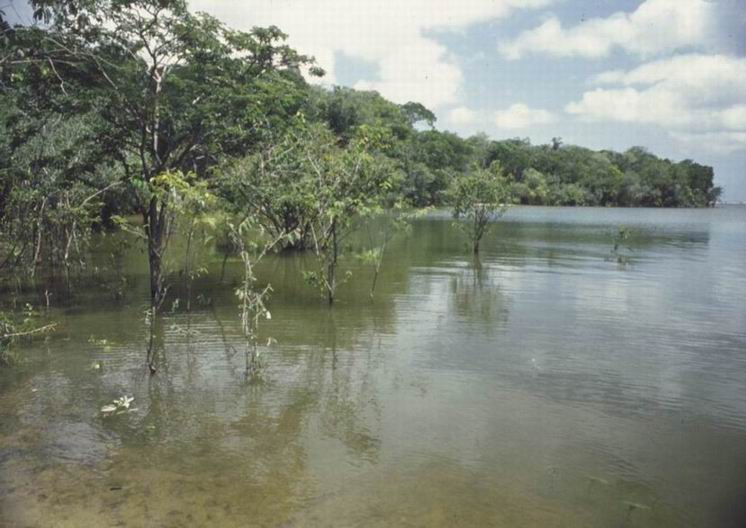
Japurá River

The floodplain holds aquatic vegetation where drainage is poor, successional vegetation, forest mosaics and permanent swamp vegetation. The várzea forests holds more species than várzea on the lower Amazon, but fewer species than in the surrounding terra firme forests. The forest is continuous. The rich understory includes plants of the families Zingiberaceae, Marantaceae and Heliconiaceae. Economically valuable timber trees include Carapa guianensis, Iryanthera surinamensis, Ceiba pentandra and Calycophyllum spruceanum. On the upper levees the most common trees are Ceiba pentandra, Hura crepitans and Parinari excelsa. On the lower levees common trees include Pterocarpus santalinoides, Eschweilera albiflora, Piranhea trifoliata and Neoxythece elegans.

The lowest areas contain abundant bamboo (Bambusa species), and pioneer trees that include Cecropia species, Pseudobombax munguba, many Ficus species and the Astrocaryum jauari palm. There are relatively few palms compared to the terra firme forests. Other palm species include Astrocaryum murumuru, Mauritia flexuosa and Bactris species including the endemic Bactris tefensis. Trees that support fruit-eating fish that enter the forest in the flood period include yellow mombim (Spondias mombim), jauari palm (Astrocaryum jauari), biribá (Rollinia deliciosa), tarumã (Vitex cymosa), and apui (Ficus species). The largest tree in the várzea is Ceiba pentandra. Other typical várzea trees are Parkia inundabilis, Septotheca tessmannii, Coumarouna micrantha, Ceiba burchellii, Ochroma lagopus and Manilkara inundata. Flooded forests hold Virola surinamensis and Euterpe oleracea.

=== Fauna ===
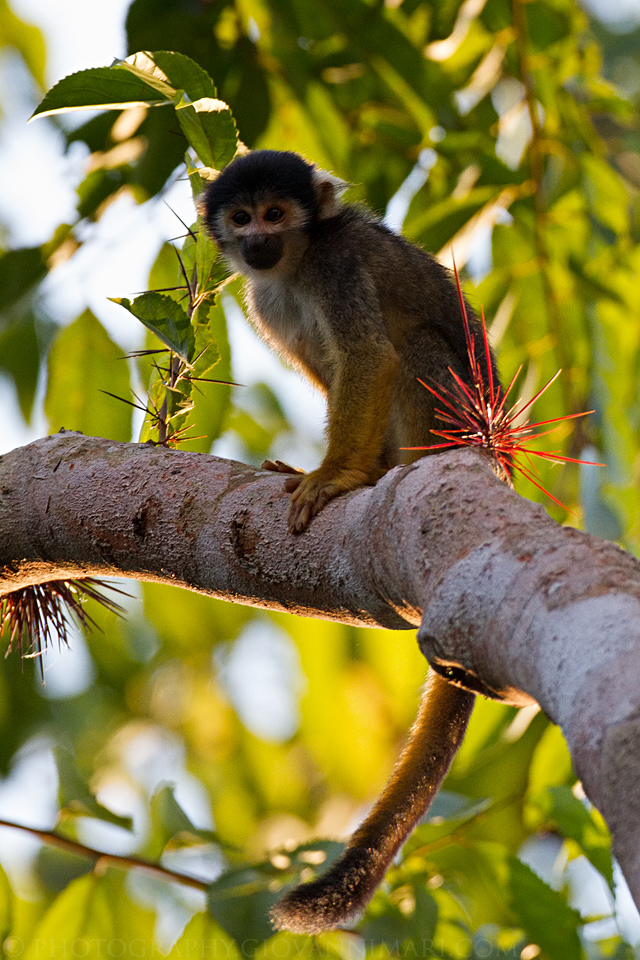
The endemic black squirrel monkey (Saimiri vanzolinii)

199 species of mammals are found in the region, fewer than in the surrounding terra firme forests. There are no ground-dwelling species in flooded várzea forests isolated from the mainland, but areas of várzea in contact with terra firme forests house ground-dwelling mammals that migrate to higher ground in the flood periods. There are two endemic primates in the Mamirauá Sustainable Development Reserve, the bald uakari (Cacajao calvus) and black squirrel monkey (Saimiri vanzolinii). The reserve is also home to white-footed saki (Pithecia albicans), emperor tamarin (Saguinus imperator), moustached tamarin (Saguinus mystax), Nancy Ma's night monkey (Aotus nancymaae) and Hershkovitz's titi (Callicebus dubius).

Other mammals include white-lipped peccary (Tayassu pecari), common agouti (Dasyprocta genus), lowland paca (Cuniculus paca), jaguar (Panthera onca), capybara (Hydrochoerus hydrochaeris), spiny tree-rat (genus Echimys) and the Ega long-tongued bat (Scleronycteris ega). Aquatic mammals include the Amazon river dolphin (Inia geoffrensis), tucuxi (Sotalia fluviatilis) and Amazonian manatee' (Trichechus inunguis). Endangered mammals include the white-bellied spider monkey (Ateles belzebuth), Peruvian spider monkey (Ateles chamek), white-cheeked spider monkey (Ateles marginatus), Marinkelle's sword-nosed bat (Lonchorhina marinkellei) and giant otter (Pteronura brasiliensis).

633 bird species have been reported. These include many aquatic species such as heron and egret (genera Egretta and Ardea), whistling duck (Dendrocygna species), ibis (Cercibis and Theristicus species) and roseate spoonbills (Platalea ajaja). Endangered birds include wattled curassow (Crax globulosa).

The very large green anaconda (Eunectes murinus) is found in the várzea. Other reptiles include black caiman (Melanosuchus niger) and spectacled caiman (Caiman crocodilus). The ecoregion is home to the endangered Johnson's horned treefrog (Hemiphractus johnsoni). Large fruit-eating fish that enter the forest during the flood period include pacu (genera Metynnis and Mylossoma), tambaqui (Colossoma macropomum), pirarucu (Arapaima gigas) and sardinha (Triportheus angulatus). Other fish include piranha (Serrasalmus species) and decorative fish from whitewater rivers and their blackwater tributaries and lakes such as blue discus (Symphysodon aequifasciatus), cichlids (genus Cichlasoma), characins (family Anostomidae), tetras (genera Hemigrammus and Hyphessobrycon), and catfish (families Aspredinidae, Callichthyidae, Doradidae and Loricariidae).

=== Status ===
According to the World Wildlife Fund the status of the ecoregion is Critical/Endangered. Smallholders along the rivers undertake mixed agriculture, forest exploitation, small-scale logging and livestock raising. In some areas the várzea forest is threatened by large-scale logging and cattle farming. Fish populations are threatened by large-scale fishing operations and may be threatened by excessive collection of aquarium fish such as the red discus (Symphysodon discus). Gold mining contaminates the Purus and Japurá with mercury.

Conservation units in the region include the Mamirauá Sustainable Development Reserve, Amanã Sustainable Development Reserve and Jaú National Park.

== Sources ==
- "Purus varzea", Global Species, Myers Enterprises II
- Sears, Robin, Northern South America: Northern central Brazil: NT0156, WWF:World Wildlife Fund
- WildFinder, WWF: World Wildlife Fund
