= Auatí-Paraná Extractive Reserve =

Extractive reserve in Amazonas, Brazil

- Reserva Extrativista Auatí-Paraná
- IUCN category VI (protected area with sustainable use of natural resources)
- Location within Brazil
- Nearest city: Japurá, Amazonas
- Coordinates: 1.99°S 66.385°W
- Area: 146,950 hectares (363,100 acres)
- Designation: Extractive reserve
- Created: 7 August 2001
- Administrator: ICMBio

The Auatí-Paraná Extractive Reserve (Portuguese: Reserva Extrativista Auatí-Paraná) is an extractive reserve is Amazonas, Brazil.

== Location ==
The Auatí-Paraná Extractive Reserve is divided between the municipalities of Japurá (54.69%) and Fonte Boa (45.31%) in Amazonas. It has an area of 146,950 hectares (363,100 acres). The reserve covers land along the north (left) bank of the Auati-Paraná Canal, (Note: The Auati-Paraná, also called the Ati-Paraná or Ati-Paranã, is sometimes called a river, sometimes a paraná (channel) and sometimes a canal. The last term seems most appropriate, since the natural canal leaves one river and joins another.) which leaves the Solimões (Upper Amazon) to the south and meanders in a generally eastward direction to join the Japurá River to the north. The reserve adjoins the Mamirauá Sustainable Development Reserve to the south.

== Environment ==
The terrain is mostly flat in the south of the reserve, gently undulating further north. Altitudes range from 39 to 79 metres (128 to 259 ft) above sea level. Average daily temperatures range from 22 to 31 °C (72 to 88 °F) with an average of 26 °C (79 °F). Average annual rainfall is 2,563 millimetres (100.9 in). There has been little study of the vegetation of the central and northern areas of the reserve. Near the river the vegetation is dense tropical rainforest including terra firms forest with rubber, Brazil nut and buriti palm trees, várzea and igapó forest. Threatened species of fauna include manatee, uacari, jaguar, ocelot and curassow.

== History ==
The Auatí-Paraná Extractive Reserve was created by federal decree on 7 August 2001 to ensure the sustainable use and conservation of renewable natural resources, and to protect the way of life and culture of the extractive population. It is classed as IUCN protected area category VI (protected area with sustainable use of natural resources). It became part of the Central Amazon Ecological Corridor, established in 2002. The reserve is managed by the Chico Mendes Institute for Biodiversity Conservation. The deliberative council was created on 20 November 2008. The management plan for the reserve was approved in 30 October 2012.

== People ==
The original inhabitants of the region were the Omágua people, a Tupi-Guarani group. They were known for their fine ceramics and finely woven clothes. They were a warlike tribe, and took slaves from the people they defeated. Claims of the Indians who traditionally lived on the reserve have not been addressed.

The present population are engaged in agriculture, hunting, fishing, fishing and crafts. Agricultural work is shared between the men and women, while hunting and fishing are considered men's occupations and women work at home. As of 2007, 80% of the population was Catholic and 20% Protestant. 80% were illiterate. The community associação agroextrativista de auati-paraná is implementing a program of best practices in Brazil nut collection. Some of the residents appear to have engaged in illegal logging for sale.

== Sources ==
- CEC Central da Amazônia (in Portuguese), ISA: Instituto Socioambiental
- Resex Auati-Paraná (in Portuguese), ICMBio: Chico Mendes Institute for Biodiversity Conservation
- RESEX Auatí-Paraná (in Portuguese), ISA: Instituto Socioambiental
- Unidade de Conservação: Reserva Extrativista Auatí-Paraná (in Portuguese), MMA: Ministério do Meio Ambiente
- Velasquez Fernandes, Carlos Henrique (October 2011), Plano de Manejo Participativo da Reserva Extrativista Auati-Paraná (PDF) (in Portuguese), Tefé / AM: Instituto Chico Mendes de Conservação da Biodiversidade
