= Amanã Sustainable Development Reserve =

- Reserva de Desenvolvimento Sustentável Amanã
- IUCN category VI (protected area with sustainable use of natural resources)
- Location within Brazil
- Location: Amazonas
- Nearest city: Tefé, Amazonas
- Coordinates: 2.403°S 64.447°W
- Area: 2,350,000 hectares (5,800,000 acres)
- Designation: Sustainable development reserve
- Created: 4 August 1998

Amanã Sustainable Development Reserve (Portuguese: Reserva de Desenvolvimento Sustentável Amanã) is a sustainable development reserve in the state of Amazonas, Brazil.

== Location ==
The Amanã Sustainable Development Reserve (RDS) covers 2,350,000 hectares (5,800,000 acres) in the north-central part of Amazonas. It covers parts of the municipalities of Maraã, Codajás, Barcelos and Coari. It partly overlaps with the Jaú National Park to its east. To the north the RDS adjoins the Rio Unini Extractive Reserve. To the west it is bounded by the Japurá River and the Mamirauá Sustainable Development Reserve on the other side of the river.

The reserve is in the area of the middle course of the Solimões River, near the point where it is joined by the Japurá River, and is about 650 kilometres (400 mi) west of Manaus. It contains Amanã Lake, 45 by 3 kilometres (28.0 by 1.9 mi), the largest lake in the Amazon region. The reserve connects the 1,124,000 hectares (2,780,000 acres) Mamirauá Sustainable Development Reserve to its south west with the 2,378,410 hectares (5,877,200 acres) Jaú National Park. The three form one of the largest contiguous areas of protected forest in the world.

== History ==
The Amanã Sustainable Development Reserve was created by decree 19.021 of 4 August 1998, and is administered by the Mamirauá Institute of Sustainable Development (Instituto de Desenvolvimento Sustentável Mamirauá). The conservation unit is supported by the Amazon Region Protected Areas Program. Jaú National Park was inscribed by UNESCO as a World Heritage Site in 2000. It became part of the Central Amazon Ecological Corridor, established in 2002. In 2003 the property was expanded by the addition of the Anavilhanas National Park, Amanã Sustainable Development Reserve and Mamirauá Sustainable Development Reserve to form the Central Amazon Conservation Complex, a larger World Heritage Site. The park became part of the Lower Rio Negro Mosaic, created in 2010.

== Environment ==
Vegetation is mostly tall terra firma forest with areas of white water várzea and black water igapó flooded forest, and small areas of white sand forest or campinarana. The reserve experiences seasonal flooding around the perimeter of the Amanã lake, but the flooded forest area is small compared to the areas of terra firma. In the lake region the change in water level is 9 to 10 metres (30 to 33 ft).

The reserve is home to various rare or endangered species including the golden-backed uakari (Cacajao melanocephalus), Amazonian manatee (Trichechus inunguis), Amazon river dolphin (Inia geoffrensis), bush dog (Speothos venaticus), short-eared dog (Atelocynus microtis), harpy eagle (Harpia harpyja) and the Arapaima fish. During the dry season the lake is home to relatively large populations of manatee. During the wet season the manatee migrate to várzea regions, mainly to Mamirauá. The undulated tinamou (Crypturellus undulatus)) follows the same pattern of migration.

Primates found in the reserve include the mottle-faced tamarin (Saguinus inustus), squirrel monkey (Saimiri sciureus), tufted capuchin (Sapajus apella), white-fronted capuchin (Cebus albifrons), collared titi (Callicebus torquatus), Venezuelan red howler (Alouatta seniculus), golden-backed uakari (Cacajao melanocephalus) and Spix's night monkey (Aotus vociferans).

== People ==
The reserve was formed after the successful implementation of the Mamirauá Sustainable Development Reserve, and was fully supported by the local people. They already recognized the importance of preserving the vegetation and animals that they depend upon for their livelihood. As of 2011 the reserve had a human population of 3,860 people in 648 households living in 80 locations in the reserve and six locations around the reserve. The people manage the reserve and engage in agriculture, hunting, fishing and logging.

== Sources ==
- Carolina de Oliveira, Amanã Reserva de Desenvolvimento Sustentável (in Portuguese), Instituto de Desenvolvimento Sustentável Mamirauá
- CEC Central da Amazônia (in Portuguese), ISA: Instituto Socioambiental
- Central Amazon Conservation Complex, UNESCO
- Full list: PAs supported by ARPA, ARPA
- Luiz Claudio Marigo (January–February 1999), "Reserva de Desenvolvimento Sustentável Amanã", AO (in Portuguese) (87), Rio de Janeiro, archived from the original on 2021-05-16
- RDS Amanã (in Portuguese), ISA: Instituto Socioambiental
- Souza, Luciane L. de; Queiroz, Helder L.; Ayres, José Márcio (December 2004), "THE MOTTLED-FACE TAMARIN, SAGUINUS INUSTUS, IN THE AMANÃ SUSTAINABLE DEVELOPMENT RESERVE, AMAZONAS, BRAZIL", Neotropical Primates, 12 (3)
- Thiago Mota Cardoso (2010), Depoimento: o mosaico do baixo rio Negro (in Portuguese), IPÊ-Instituto de Pesquisas Ecológicas
