= Solimões–Japurá moist forests =

Ecoregion in the Amazon biome

Solimões-Japurá moist forests
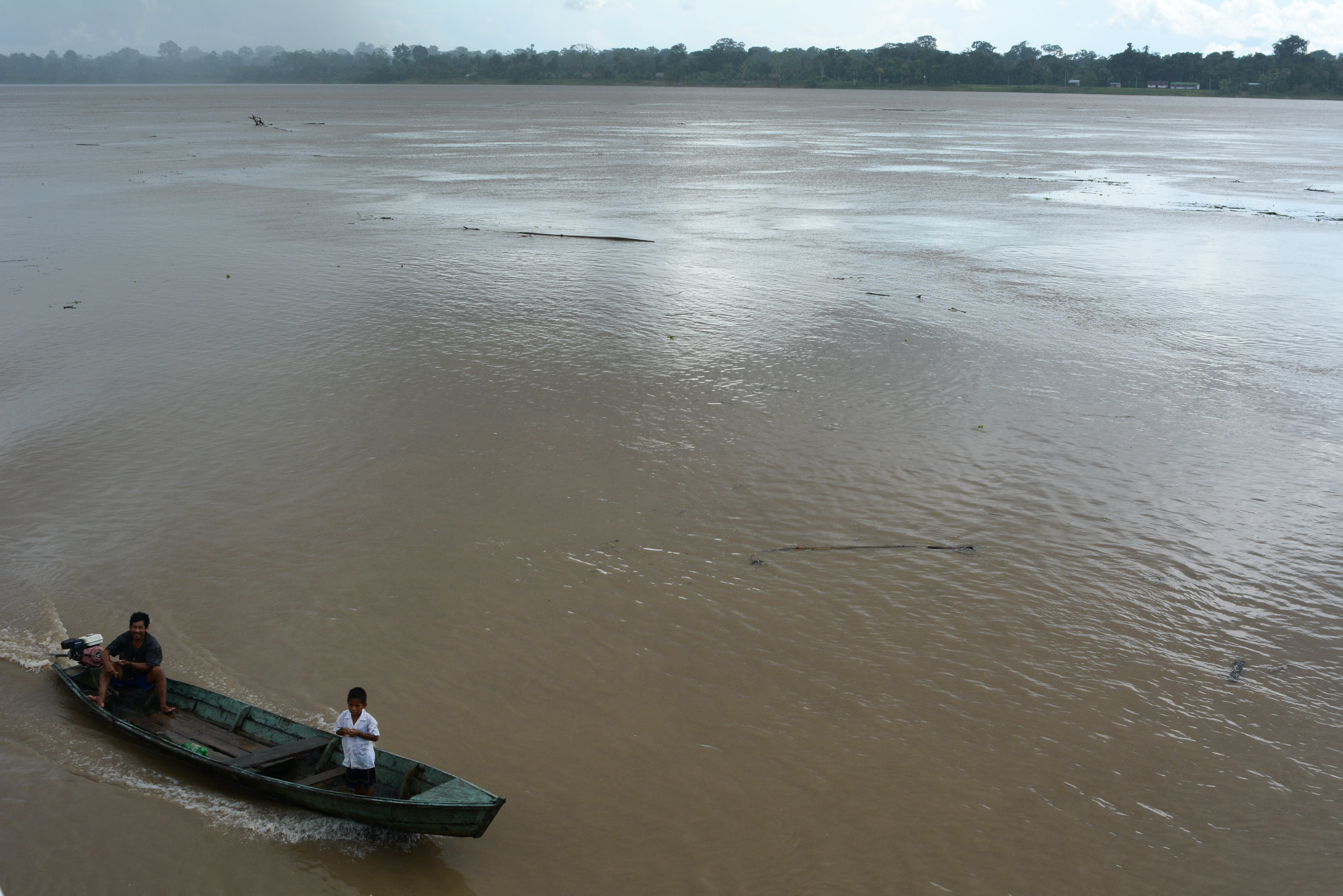
- Leticia, Amazonas, Colombia

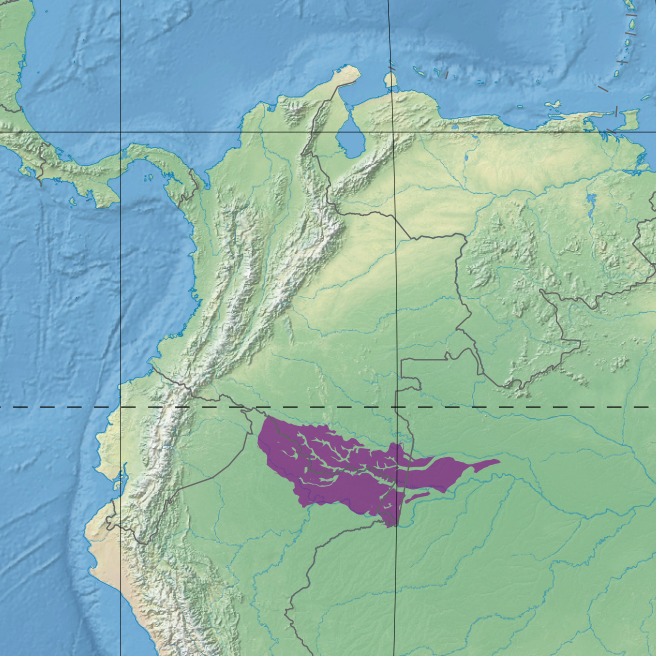
- Ecoregion in purple

Ecology
- Realm: Neotropical
- Biome: Tropical and subtropical moist broadleaf forests

Geography
- Area: 167,572.23 km^{2} (64,700.00 sq mi)
- Countries: Brazil, Colombia, Peru
- Coordinates: 2.413°S 70.925°W

The Solimões-Japurá moist forests (NT0163) is an ecoregion in northwest Brazil and eastern Peru and Colombia in the Amazon biome. It has a hot climate with high rainfall throughout the year, and holds one of the most diverse collections of fauna and flora in the world. The ecoregion is relatively intact.

== Location ==
The Solimões-Japurá moist forests has an area of 16,757,223 hectares (41,408,000 acres) divided among Colombia, Brazil and Peru. The northern boundary of the western portion in Colombia is defined by the Caqueta River. The Caqueta separates the ecoregion from the Caquetá moist forests to the north. The Caqueta becomes the Japurá River when it crosses Colombia's border with Brazil, and the Japurá (or the Purus várzea along the Japurá) defines the northern boundary in Brazil to the point where the Japurá meets the Solimões River. The Japurá-Solimões-Negro moist forests lies to the north of the Japurá.

The Purus várzea and then the Iquitos várzea along the Solimões define the southern boundary in Brazil and Peru. The Purus várzea forms the south east border, and elements of the Purus várzea are found along rivers throughout the Solimões-Japurá ecoregion. The Iquitos várzea forms the southwest border, separating the Solimões-Japurá ecoregion from the Southwest Amazon moist forests further south. The Solimões-Japurá moist forests adjoins the Napo moist forests to the west. The Napo River separates the Solimões-Japurá moist forest from the Napo moist forests.

== Physical ==
The ecoregion covers upland alluvial plains formed in the Tertiary period. The terrain includes floodplains, rolling hills, steep banks and plateaus. Elevations are typically from 100 to 220 metres (330 to 720 ft), but in Colombia the sandstone plateaus rise to 500 metres (1,600 ft). The Putumayo River, which defines the border between Peru and Colombia, runs through the region, which is also drained by the Caquetá, Napo and Solimões. There is a variety of soil types, but most are oxisols and ultisols poor in nutrients and high in aluminum and iron.

== Ecology ==
The Solimões-Japurá moist forests ecoregion is in the Neotropical realm and the tropical and subtropical moist broadleaf forests biome. The climate and complex physical environment make the ecoregion one of the most biologically diverse in the world.

=== Climate ===
The climate is hot and humid, with high rainfall. The Köppen climate classification is "Af": equatorial, fully humid. Temperatures vary little throughout the year, with mean temperatures from 25.3 to 26.5 °C (77.5 to 79.7 °F), minimum temperatures from 20.5 to 21.6 °C (68.9 to 70.9 °F) and maximum temperatures from 30.1 to 31.5 °C (86.2 to 88.7 °F). There is heavy precipitation throughout the year, ranging from an average of 187.2 millimetres (7.37 in) in August to 324.1 millimetres (12.76 in) in April. Rain falls almost every day of the year. Total annual precipitation is around 3,100 millimetres (120 in).

=== Flora ===
15 types of vegetation have been defined in just one part of the ecoregion in Colombia. Most of the vegetation is tall, dense evergreen tropical rainforest, rich in plant species. It includes well-drained terra firme upland forest, well-drained floodplain forest, poorly drained floodplain forest and swamp forest. The whitewater rivers carry organic and mineral sediments washed down from the Andes, which they deposit during the annual floods, so the soils in the floodplains are richer in nutrients than in the terra firme areas. The floodplain forests belong to the Purus várzea ecoregion. The Peruvian part of the ecoregion contains areas of nutrient-poor white sand similar to the Brazilian campinarana ecoregion. The vegetation is sclerophyllous low scrub or open-canopy low forest with distinctive flora and fauna and high levels of endemism. The sandstone plateaus in Colombia have shrub and savanna vegetation related to the Guiana region.

The dense forests on the uplands have a canopy of up to 35 metres (115 ft) with emergent trees up to 40 metres (130 ft). The forests often have a dense understory of lianas, palms, epiphytes, mosses and ferns. Flora are typical of the Amazon biome. The most common families of trees are Annonaceae, Lecythidaceae, Myristicaceae, Fabaceae and Sapotaceae. Emergent trees include Ceiba pentandra, Terminalia amazonia, Cedrelinga cateniformis, Carapa guianensis and Hevea guianensis. Commercially valuable timber trees include Virola surinamensis, Cedrela odorata and Carapa guianensis.

=== Fauna ===
Fauna are typical of the Amazon region. Many of the species are at the furthest west of their range. 181 species of mammals have been recorded including equatorial saki (Pithecia aequatorialis), golden-mantled tamarin (Saguinus tripartitus), Goeldi's marmoset (Callimico goeldii), jaguar (Panthera onca), margay (Leopardus wiedii), Sechuran fox (Lycalopex sechurae), southern little yellow-eared bat (Vampyressa pusilla), Schmidts's big-eared bat (Micronycteris schmidtorum), South American tapir (Tapirus terrestris), giant anteater (Myrmecophaga tridactyla), silky anteater (Cyclopes didactylus), southern tamandua (Tamandua tetradactyla), long-nosed armadillo (Dasypus), gray brocket (Mazama gouazoubira), red brocket (Mazama americana) and West Indian manatee (Trichechus manatus). Endangered mammals include white-bellied spider monkey (Ateles belzebuth) and giant otter (Pteronura brasiliensis).

About 542 species of birds have been recorded, of which 500 are found in the Amacayacu National Park. Birds endemic to the ecoregion or rarely found elsewhere in the Amazon region include ashy-tailed swift (Chaetura andrei), blue-tufted starthroat (Heliomaster furcifer), pavonine quetzal (Pharomachrus pavoninus), white-eared jacamar (Galbalcyrhynchus leucotis), ochre-striped antpitta (Grallaria dignissima), Salvin's curassow (Mitu salvini), and golden-winged tody-flycatcher (Poecilotriccus calopterus). Endangered birds include wattled curassow (Crax globulosa).

Reptiles include Arrau turtle (Podocnemis expansa), spectacled caiman (Caiman crocodilus), green iguana (Iguana iguana) and tegus lizards (Tupinambis genus). Snakes include green anaconda (Eunectes murinus), lanceheads (Bothrops atrox), palm pit-vipers (Bothriechis genus), coral snakes (Micrurus genus), boa constrictor (Boa constrictor), emerald tree boa (Corallus caninus), and bushmaster (Lachesis muta). Fish include silver arowana (Osteoglossum bicirrhosum), tetras (Hyphessobrycon and Bryconops genera), piranhas (Serrasalmus genus) and ocellate river stingray (Potamotrygon motoro). Endangered amphibians include Johnson's horned treefrog (Hemiphractus johnsoni).

== Status ==
The World Wildlife Fund class the ecoregion as "Relatively Stable/Intact". There are only two short roads in the whole region. The original habitat is mostly intact, but large areas along the Caquetá and Putumayo rivers have been deforested for production of coca (Erythroxylum coca), logging, mining and cattle ranching. These activities threaten the remaining forest. Colombia has strong laws regulating logging but they are poorly enforced. Almost all the mahogany (Swietenia macrophylla) has been logged, and most of the tropical cedar (Cedrela odorata) has been logged along the main rivers.

About one third of the ecoregion, between the Putumayo and Caquetá rivers in Colombia, is the territory of indigenous people. They practice extraction and small-scale farming in shifting locations. The Cahuinari and Amacayacu national parks in Colombia protect 8,690 square kilometres (3,360 sq mi) of rainforest. The Mamirauá Sustainable Development Reserve in Brazil protects part of the ecoregion.

== Sources ==
- Sears, Robin; Marín, César, Northern South America: northwestern Brazil, southern Colombia, and northern Peru (NT0163), WWF: World Wildlife Fund
- "Solimões-Japurá moist forest", Global Species, Myers Enterprises II
- WildFinder, WWF: World Wildlife Fund
