= Stenoma subnotatella =

Scientific classification
- Kingdom: Animalia
- Phylum: Arthropoda
- Class: Insecta
- Order: Lepidoptera
- Family: Depressariidae
- Genus: Stenoma
- Species: S. subnotatella

Binomial name
- Stenoma subnotatella (Walker, 1864)

Synonyms
- Cryptolechia subnotatella Walker, 1864

Species of moth

Stenoma subnotatella is a moth in the family Depressariidae. It was described by Francis Walker in 1864. It is found in Ega (now Tefé), Brazil.

Adults are whitish, the forewings rounded at the tips and with three blackish points in a line along the disc, as well as an elongated blackish dot between the first and second points, but nearer the interior border. There are two blackish costal points, the first nearly opposite the dot and the costa and exterior border are very slightly convex, the latter hardly oblique.
