= Rio Unini Extractive Reserve =

Extractive reserve in Amazonas, Brazil

- Reserva Extrativista Rio Unini
- IUCN category VI (protected area with sustainable use of natural resources)
- Location within Brazil
- Nearest city: Barcelos, Amazonas
- Coordinates: 1°30′50″S 63°11′46″W
- Area: 833,352 hectares (2,059,260 acres)
- Designation: Extractive reserve
- Created: 21 June 2006
- Administrator: Chico Mendes Institute for Biodiversity Conservation

The Rio Unini Extractive Reserve (Portuguese: Reserva Extrativista Rio Unini) is an extractive reserve in the state of Amazonas, Brazil.

== Location ==
The Rio Unini Extractive Reserve is in the municipality of Barcelos, Amazonas. It has an area of 833,352 hectares (2,059,260 acres). It extends upstream along the left (north) bank of the Unini River from its mouth on the Rio Negro and then upstream along the left bank of its main tributary, the Água Preta stream. The eastern section adjoins the Jaú National Park, and the western section adjoins the Amanã Sustainable Development Reserve, both to the south of the river or stream. The reserve is part of the Amazonia Central Corridor, the Biosphere Reserve of the Central Amazon and the Lower Rio Negro Mosaic. The mosaic was created in 2010 with eleven conservation units, giving a forum for diverse social actors to communicate and manage development projects in the broader region.

== Environment ==
Average annual rainfall is about 2,000 millimetres (79 in). Temperatures range from 14 to 39 °C (57 to 102 °F) with an average of 25 °C (77 °F). The terrain is flat and undulating. The reserve has very diverse geology, soil, vegetation and fauna. The main river, the Unini, has numerous meanders and floodplains, with a rich diversity of aquatic environments.

Vegetation includes dense rainforest (53%), terra firma forest (29%), igapó (11%) and campinarana (5%). Fauna in the reserve that are endemic to the Rio Negro basin include the Symphysodon discus and Cacajao melanocephalus. The fish of the black water Unini are mostly of the Characiformes and Siluriformes orders. There are three newly discovered fish species, and several rare species of birds and bees. Some of the fish, turtles and birds are at risk from over-hunting. There is some risk from illegal fishing, mining and deforestation, but it is low compared to other conservation units.

== Economy ==
There are about eleven communities in the region, four within the reserve and seven in its surroundings. These are relatively small groups of people with low levels of education and poor access to health care. Their main economic activity is subsistence agriculture, followed by extraction of vines and nuts for trade. The reserve has good potential for ecotourism, including jungle tours and sports fishing, although both activities cause environmental conflicts. The residents are represented by the Unini River Residents' Association (AMORU), the Association of Tapiíra Community Residents (AMOTAPI) and the Unini River Residents cooperative (COOMARU).

== History ==
The initiative for creating the reserve came from the AMORU, which helped resolve conflicts caused by creation of the Jaú National Park, and made the community aware of the reason for choosing the "extractive reserve" category of conservation unit. The Rio Unini Extractive Reserve was created by presidential decree on 21 June 2006. It became part of the Central Amazon Ecological Corridor, established in 2002. It is administered by the Chico Mendes Institute for Biodiversity Conservation (ICMBio). The reserve is classed as IUCN protected area category VI (protected area with sustainable use of natural resources). An extractive reserve is an area used by traditional extractive populations whose livelihood is based on extraction, subsistence agriculture and small-scale animal raising. Its basic objectives are to protect the livelihoods and culture of these people and to ensure sustainable use of natural resources.

On 27 December 2006 the Instituto Nacional de Colonização e Reforma Agrária (INCRA: National Institute for Colonization and Agrarian Reform) recognised the reserve as supporting 138 families of small rural producers, who would qualify for PRONAF assistance. The deliberative council was created on 10 November 2009. The management plan was approved on 6 October 2014. On 16 December 2014 ICMBio and the Fundação Vitória Amazônia (FVA) agreed to cooperate for a period of five years in developing nature conservation actions and research in the reserve and the Jaú National Park. As of 2016 the reserve was supported by the Amazon Region Protected Areas Program.

== Sources ==
- CEC Central da Amazônia (in Portuguese), ISA: Instituto Socioambiental
- Full list: PAs supported by ARPA, ARPA
- Resex Rio Unini (in Portuguese), ICMBio: Chico Mendes Institute for Biodiversity Conservation
- RESEX Rio Unini (in Portuguese), ISA: Instituto Socioambiental
- Unidade de Conservação: Reserva Extrativista Rio Unini (in Portuguese), MMA: Ministério do Meio Ambiente
