= Mamirauá Sustainable Development Reserve =

Protected area of Amazonas, Brazil

- Reserva de Desenvolvimento Sustentável Mamirauá
- IUCN category VI (protected area with sustainable use of natural resources)
- Location within Brazil
- Location: Amazonas, Brazil
- Nearest city: Tefé
- Coordinates: 2°16′S 65°41′W
- Area: 4,300 sq mi (11,000 km^{2})
- Designation: Sustainable development reserve
- Established: 1996

Ramsar Wetland
- Official name: Mamirauá
- Designated: 4 October 1993
- Reference no.: 623

The Mamirauá Sustainable Development Reserve (Portuguese: Reserva de Desenvolvimento Sustentável Mamirauá) in the Brazilian state of Amazonas, near the city of Tefé, is a 4,300-square-mile (11,000 km^{2}) reserve near the village of Boca do Mamirauá. It includes mostly Amazonian flooded forest and wetlands. The ribeirinhos are native to the area.

== Location ==
The Mamirauá Sustainable Development Reserve is divided between the municipalities of Uarini (18.68%), Tonantins (1.24%), Maraã (26.74%), Japurá (1.33%) and Fonte Boa (52.01%) in the state of Amazonas. It has an area of 1,124,000 hectares (2,780,000 acres). It covers the elongated triangle between the Solimões River (Upper Amazon) to the south, the Auati-Paraná Canal, which leaves the Solimões and meanders in a generally eastward direction to join the Japurá River to the north, and the Japurá from the junction with the Auati-Paraná to the point where it joins the Solimões. It adjoins the Auatí-Paraná Extractive Reserve to the north. The Amanã Sustainable Development Reserve lies on the opposite bank of the Japurá to the east.

== Protection ==
Mamirauá is recognised by the international Ramsar Convention, as a wetland of global importance, as well as part of a World Heritage Convention's natural site. At present, it is included in one of the ecological corridors to be implemented by the PPG-7 Program for the Protection of Brazilian Tropical Forests.

Jaú National Park was inscribed by UNESCO as a World Heritage Site in 2000. It became part of the Central Amazon Ecological Corridor, established in 2002. In 2003 the property was expanded by the addition of the Anavilhanas National Park, Amanã Sustainable Development Reserve and Mamirauá Sustainable Development Reserve to form the Central Amazon Conservation Complex, a larger World Heritage Site.

The reserve is the legacy and life work of Brazilian scientist José Márcio Ayres.

Mamirauá has a human population estimated in 6,306 individuals, including amazonian caboclo, Ticuna, Cambeba and Cocama Amerindian groups.

Mamirauá also protects against the illegal hunting of caiman crocodiles, an endangered species due to human hunting for the sale of their skins.

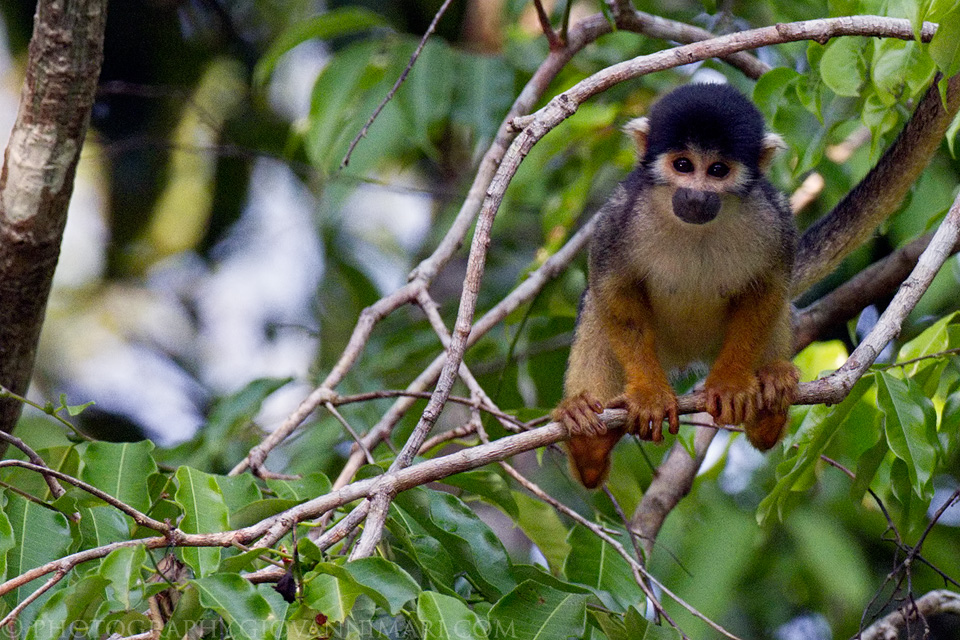
Saimiri vanzolinii is a primate species endemic of the reserve.

== Wildlife ==
The reserve is in the Solimões-Japurá moist forests and Purus várzea eco regions. There are two endemic primates, the white uakari (Cacajao calvus calvus) and black-head squirrel monkey (Saimiri vanzolinii). The reserve is also home of other kinds primates, such as the Juruá red howler monkey, the Peruvian spider monkey, pygmy marmosets and saki monkeys. The reserve also harbours other arboreal mammals species such as the brown-throated sloth, the South American coati, the northern Amazon red squirrel and the collared anteater. Land mammals are not that common as most of the territory is flooded during the wet season, although jaguars may reside and remain in the forest even during flooding. Mamirauá hosts a large diversity of birds, with more than 400 species recorded, including toucans, harpy eagle, hoatzin, parrots and, specially, aquatic birds. The most conspicuous fish species are tambaqui, piranha and pirarucu. Mamirauá is ideally situated to view the Amazon river dolphins, both boto and tucuxi.

== See also ==
- Ecotourism in the Amazon rainforest

== Sources ==
- CEC Central da Amazônia (in Portuguese), ISA: Instituto Socioambiental
- Central Amazon Conservation Complex, UNESCO
- RDS Mamirauá (in Portuguese), ISA: Instituto Socioambiental
- Sears, Robin, Northern South America: Northern central Brazil: NT0156, WWF:World Wildlife Fund
- "Solimões-Japurá moist forest", Global Species, Myers Enterprises II, archived from the original on 2019-04-21
