= Auati-Paraná Canal =

- Location within Brazil
- Native name: Canal Auati-Paraná (Portuguese)

Location
- Country: Brazil

Physical characteristics
- Source
  - location: Amazonas state, Solimões River
  - coordinates: 2.542059°S 67.375437°W
- Mouth
  - location: Japurá River
  - coordinates: 1.835417°S 65.708443°W

The Auati-Paraná Canal (Portuguese: Canal Auati-Paraná) is a natural canal of Amazonas state in north-western Brazil. It is a distributary that leaves the Solimões River and joins the Japurá River.

== Course ==
The Auati-Paraná, also called the Ati-Paraná or Ati-Paranã, is sometimes called a river, sometimes a paraná (channel) and sometimes a canal. The last term seems most appropriate, since the natural canal leaves one river and joins another. The canal divides the lower western Amazon plateau to the north from the Amazon plain. The canal forms the boundary between the 146,950 hectares (363,100 acres) Auatí-Paraná Extractive Reserve, created in 2001, on the north bank, and the Mamirauá Sustainable Development Reserve on the south bank. The canal is a body of white water, but almost all the streams that flow into it from the extractive reserve are black water.

== See also ==
- List of rivers of Amazonas

== Sources ==
- RESEX Auatí-Paraná (in Portuguese), ISA: Instituto Socioambiental
- Velasquez Fernandes, Carlos Henrique (October 2011), Plano de Manejo Participativo da Reserva Extrativista Auati-Paraná (PDF) (in Portuguese), Tefé / AM: Instituto Chico Mendes de Conservação da Biodiversidade
