= Igapó =

Flooded Amazon forests in Brazil

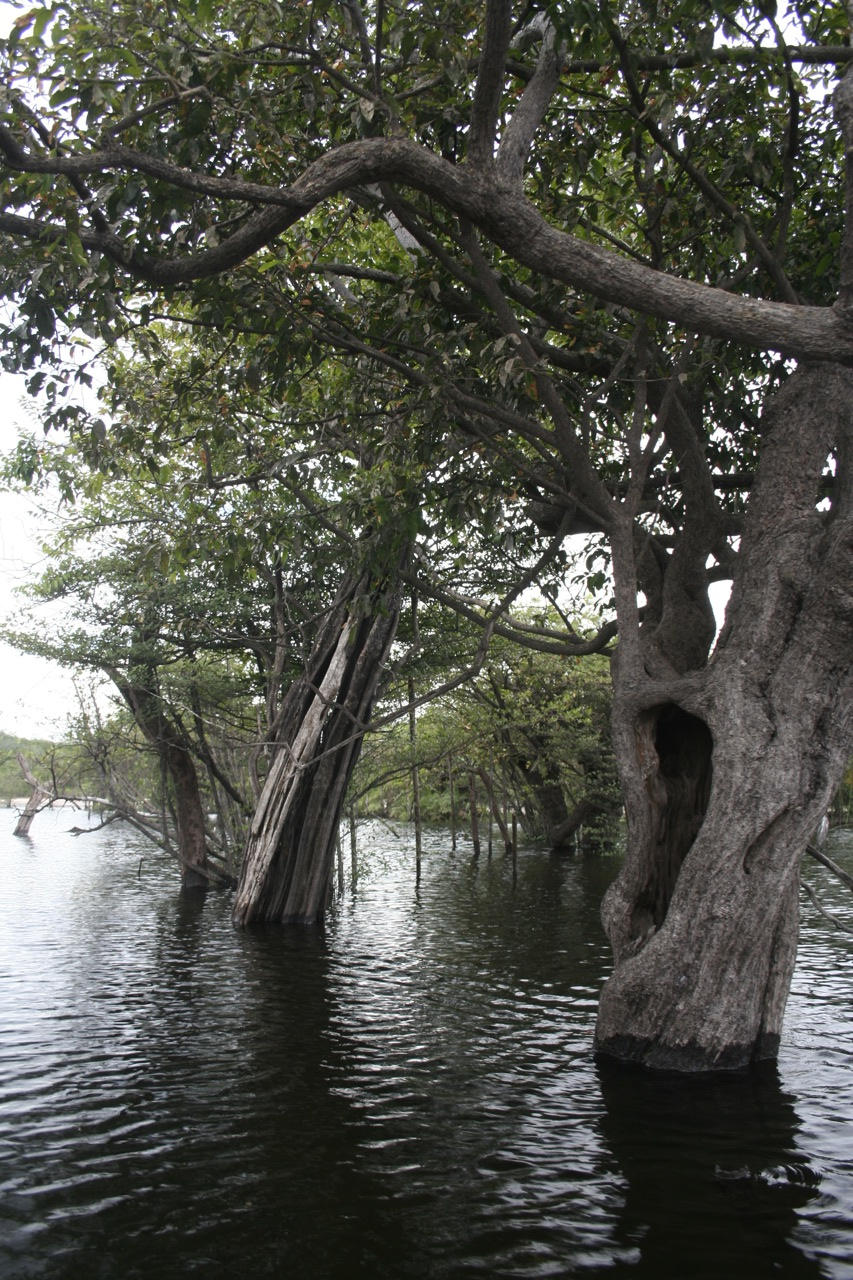
Igapó in Brazil

Igapó (Portuguese pronunciation: [igaˈpɔ], from Old Tupi: "root forest") is a word used in Brazil for blackwater-flooded forests in the Amazon biome. These forests and similar swamp forests are seasonally inundated with freshwater. They typically occur along the lower reaches of rivers and around freshwater lakes. Freshwater swamp forests are found in a range of climate zones, from boreal through temperate and subtropical to tropical. In the Amazon Basin of Brazil, a seasonally whitewater-flooded forest is known as a várzea, which is similar to igapó in many regards; the key difference between the two habitats is in the type of water that floods the forest.

== Characteristics ==
Igapó is primarily characterized by seasonal inundation caused by abundant rainfall; in some areas, trees can be submerged for up to 6 months of the year. These ecosystems are relatively open and feature over 30% canopy cover with an average canopy height ranging from 20–25 m (65–80 ft); sparse measurements of trees can reach 33–36 m (110–120 ft). Tree composition includes a varied mixture of leaf types and seasonality. Development of tree communities within the freshwater swamp forests rely heavily on microtopography and flooding intensity. Swamp forests can have harsh environments, in which only a few adapted species are able to sustain life or dominate over other tree species. One of the tree species mostly found in freshwater swamp forests are legume trees, in which most swamp forests have high single legume species populations. Legume trees in these forests are thought to be abundant in nitrogen fixation, which is most common in waterlogged locations and is thought to be a favorable trait when experiencing seasonal and/or constant waterlogging.

Freshwater swamp forests can be classified into two categories of forested wetlands, which are permanently and periodically flooded forests. It is possible to find these two types because of the high microtopographic variation. Due to these topographic differences, tree communities are delimited and have a distribution over small continuous areas.

These forests may be able to sustain a large number of bird, mammal, reptile, amphibian, fish and invertebrate species, however, biodiversity varies between wetland ecosystems and the species richness of the freshwater swamp forests is not entirely known. As for plant species, these forests have a lower diversity compared to other types of forests, such as the terra firme, in South America.

== Soil chemistry ==
Igapó forests are characterized by sandy acidic soils that have a low nutrient content. The color and acidity of the water is due to soil organic molecules called humic substances (e.g. humic acid, fulvic acid) that are dissolved in the water. The acidity from the water translates into acidic soils. They are the more nutrient poor than a comparable várzea forest. They also "carry less suspended inorganic elements and contain elevated concentrations of dissolved organic material such as humic and fulvic acids". Therefore, igapó forests support comparatively less life and the environment found within these areas tend to lack species diversity and animal biomass. Várzea forest soils have high nutrient contents because they receive a transport of high sediment loads from the whitewater rivers. In contrast, igapó forests do not receive this seasonal influx of sediments which explains the nutrient poor soils. However, they do have the highest phosphorus concentrations out of comparable várzea and terra firma forest soils. Nevertheless, the seasonal inundation of the soils leads to anoxic conditions which limits plant growth.

== Flora ==
Igapó and other flooded forests typically display a lower diversity of plants than that seen in terra firma forests. Similar to other forests found throughout the tropics, it is common to observe only a few dominant tree species Distribution of trees and other plants is highly dependent on inundation tolerances of species causing a non-random distribution of plants where more flood-tolerant species are found at lower elevations and less flood-tolerant species are found on higher ground. Fabaceae (or Leguminosae) and Euphorbiaceae are the dominant families of plants observed in igapó forest.

=== Seed dispersal ===
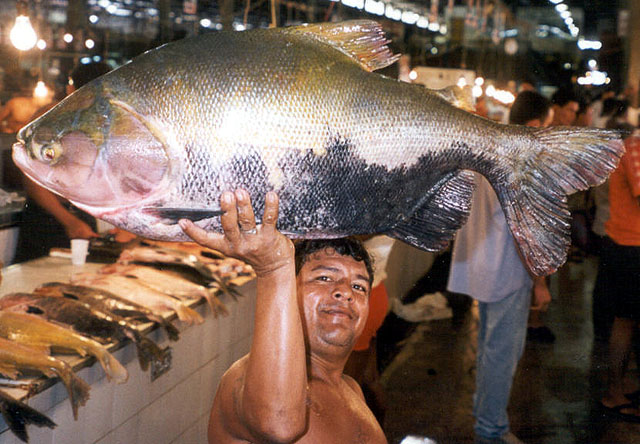
Pacu (Colossoma macropomum), an important food fish and seed predator common in igapó

Tree species adapted to seasonal inundation have adapted to maximize fruit production during periods of flooding in order to take advantage of newly available seed dispersal methods. Fish consume nearly all fruit that fall into the water, and species that are unable to digest the seeds eventually excrete and disperse them into the water. Dispersal by other vectors such as birds and monkeys is secondary to that of fishes in igapó. An important factor in seed survival is the presence of seed predators. Fishes that lack the strong jaws found in characins, such as catfish, digest the fleshy material of the fruit while the seeds pass through the gut unharmed. Because many catfishes are bottom-feeders, they are critical dispersers for seeds that sink upon entering the water.

== Fauna ==
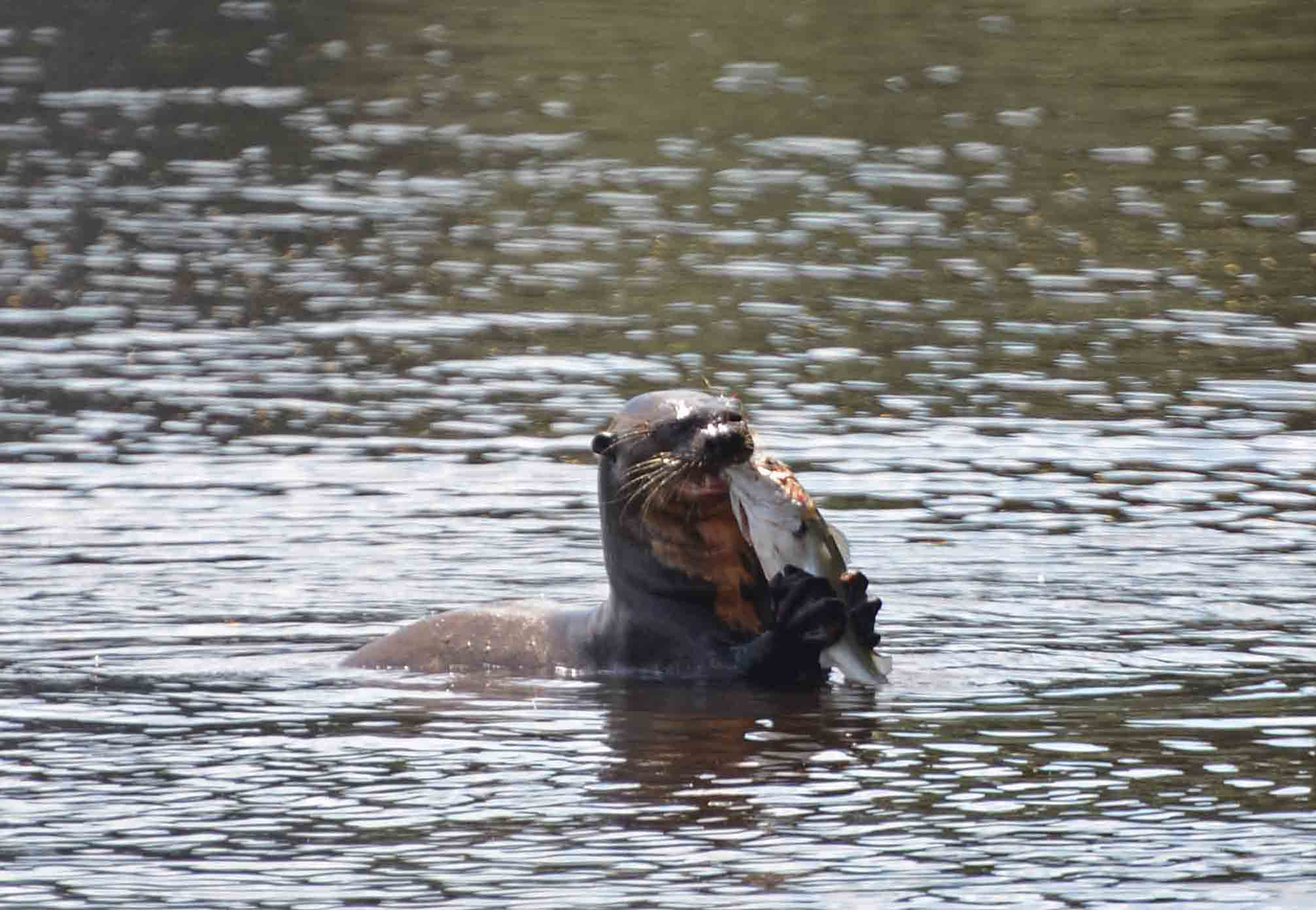
Giant otter (Pteronura brasiliensis)

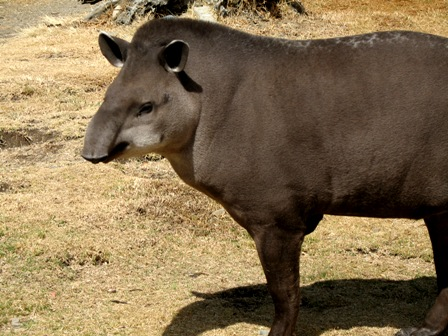
Brazilian tapir (Tapirus terrestrus)

Diversity of terrestrial wildlife and fishes in igapó is highly influenced by flooding. During periods of inundation, vast numbers of aquatic species migrate into the flooded forest in search of food. Fish populations are highest during maximum fruiting periods and river dolphins and giant otters move in to prey upon them. Compared to terra firma forests, igapó features lower nutrients and favors slow-growing plants with low fleshy fruit production, which has resulted in a lower diversity and abundance of animals.

Larger terrestrial mammals have varied strategies of dealing with flooding: red brocket deer and collared peccaries move into islands and shift diet from fruit to browsing woody plants. White-lipped peccaries and tapirs are largely unaffected by seasonal inundation; both species take advantage of the greater abundance of fruit during these times. White-lipped peccaries migrate between flooded and dry areas and tapirs are highly capable swimmers.

Arboreal mammals such as monkeys tend to be lower in species richness compared to terra firma forests due to the decrease in tree diversity and the resulting lack of variety of suitable food types. A lower population density of birds also reflects the lack of nutrients found in igapó forests. For example, within Jaú National Park, 247 species of birds are found in terra firma forests; 121 of those species are limited to that habitat. Within neighboring igapó forests, 194 species of birds are found; of those, just 58 are restricted to igapó.

== Human occupation and use ==
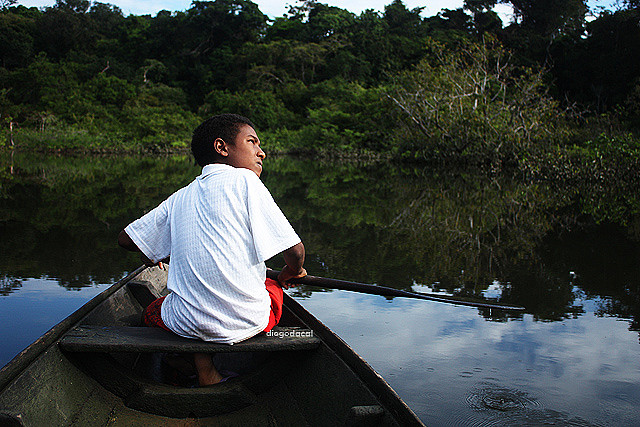
A young guide in Óbidos, Pará, Brazil

Native Amazonians have been using and modifying the forests in which they have lived for thousands of years. Several studies suggest that the presence of nutrient-rich "black earth" in typically nutrient-poor igapó environments indicates intense fertilization and burning of these areas. Black earth is a modified soil characterized by high nutrient content from highly stable organic matter and high levels of phosphorus.

The highly fertile soils and the openness of these areas confirm that the native Amazonians have been using these fields for agriculture.

However, the Amazonians have not only used these areas for crops; they have used their agricultural lands as a place to hunt as well. Many animals (rodents, tapirs and deer) are attracted to these areas for food. The Amazonians produce a surplus so that the animals do not over-consume their food resource. Though, if the animals do start to deplete their crops, they will then harvest higher numbers of animals. Additionally, Amazonians consume fish as a main source of protein. Indigenous peoples understand that, while flooded, the forest serves as an essential feeding ground that increases fish abundance. Because of this, many protect igapó forests from deforestation.

== Conservation ==
The greatest threat to igapó forests is the construction of hydroelectric dams on tributaries of the Amazon river; when constructed, the dams will divert huge amounts of water and dramatically change the hydrology of the Amazon basin and its ecosystems. Because many flora within seasonally inundated forests are highly adapted to a particular flooding schedule, alterations in flood patterns and the creation of permanently flooded areas will induce higher rates of tree mortality. The loss of these trees will likely affect populations of frugivorous understory birds, such as the blue-throated piping guan and some Amazona parrots that are restricted to igapó. Loss of habitat will cause migrations of species that will inevitably lead to higher competition in unaffected habitats and possibly local extinctions.

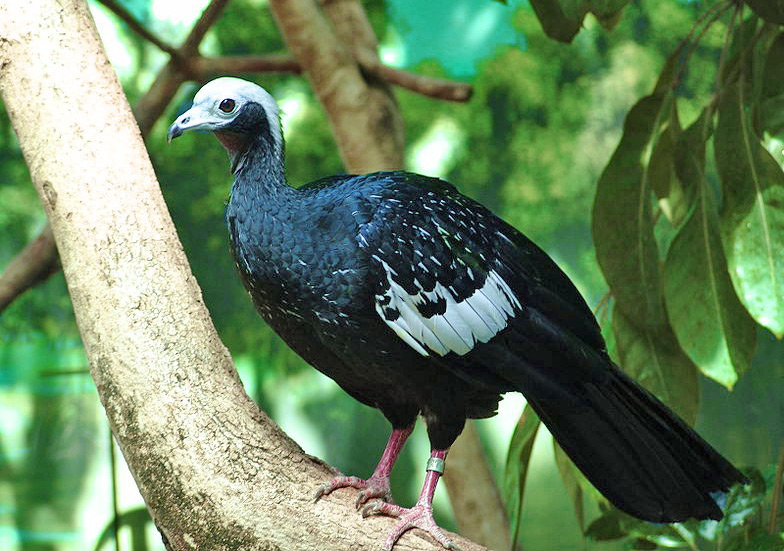
Blue-throated piping guan (Pipile cumanensis), one of the species likely to be affected by hydroelectric dams

Deforestation is also a large conservation concern because igapó forests are characterized by slow tree growth due to low soil nutrient content and high soil acidity. Despite low nutrient availability, igapó and other floodplain forests can be biodiverse with some partially endemic species. Due to soil chemistry and seasonal inundation, trees and other resources tend to grow back more slowly after harvest by humans than in other types of Amazonian forests, . Accordingly, igapó forests cannot sustain timber harvest. For the future, igapó forests should be fully protected from logging and deforestation because of the low productivity found in them.

In protected areas, such as Jaú National Park, the lack of indigenous inhabitants and a low population of rural families limits the potential for over-harvest of fish and turtle species. However, enforcement of harvest regulation is problematic when there are only three park rangers at the entrance to the park. In other unprotected areas that lack rangers, unregulated harvest of fauna by peoples that move into igapó forests to hunt and fish may adversely affect future stocks. Approximately 3% of the Amazon's seasonally inundated forests are under protection within national parks or biological reserves.

== Notable areas ==
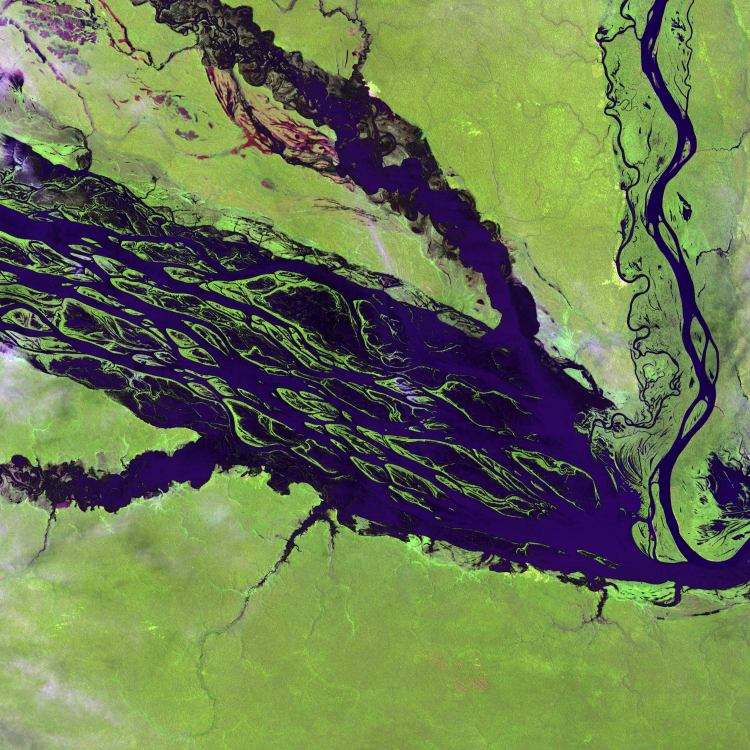
Jaú National Park as seen from Landsat 7

Freshwater swamp forests are distributed in multiple climate zones throughout the world, such as boreal, temperate, tropical and subtropic zones. They are found in the Afrotropics, Australasia, Indomalaya, and the Neotropics. However, they are most notably found in Amazonian areas.

Cantão
Igapó forests are one of the distinct natural communities found in the Cantão State Park. They offer a rich bird fauna that includes some habitat specialists due to the unique ecosystem the blackwater inundation provides. The trees in the igapó bloom once the inundation season begins. They do this so they can drop their fruit into the water to be dispersed by the different fish taxa.
Jaú National Park
The Jaú National Park was designated in 1980 and is the largest national park in the Amazon Basin and the second largest protected tropical forest. It is known for its high level of biodiversity and varying ecosystems within. The park protects the entire watershed of the Jaú River, which happens to be one of the best examples of a blackwater ecosystem where the water is colored by acidic decomposing organic matter.
Mamirauá Sustainable Development Reserve
a 57,000 km^{2} (22,000 sq mi) near Tefé, Brazil
Anavilhanas Ecological Station
an ecological station that includes hundreds of islands in the Rio Negro

== See also ==
- Freshwater swamp forest
- Varzea
- Swamp
