= Maraã =

Municipality of Amazonas, Brazil

- Municipality
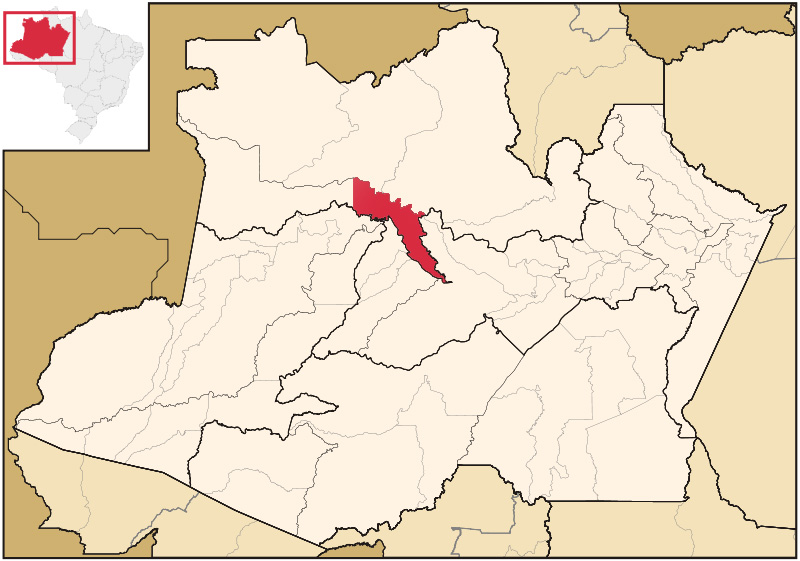
- Location of the municipality inside Amazonas

- Location in Brazil
- Coordinates: 1°51′21″S 65°34′51″W
- Country: Brazil
- Region: North
- State: Amazonas

Population (2020)
  - Total: 18,261
- Time zone: UTC−4 (AMT)

Maraã is a municipality located in the Brazilian state of Amazonas. Its population was 18,261 (2020) and its area is 16,910 km^{2}. Together with the municipality Japurá it forms the microregion Japurá.

The municipality contains part of the Amanã Sustainable Development Reserve.

In 2018, Amazon Deep Jungle Tours started operating in Maraã as the first tour agency in the region.
