= Jaú National Park =

National park in Amazonas, Brazil

- Parque Nacional do Jaú
- IUCN category II (national park)
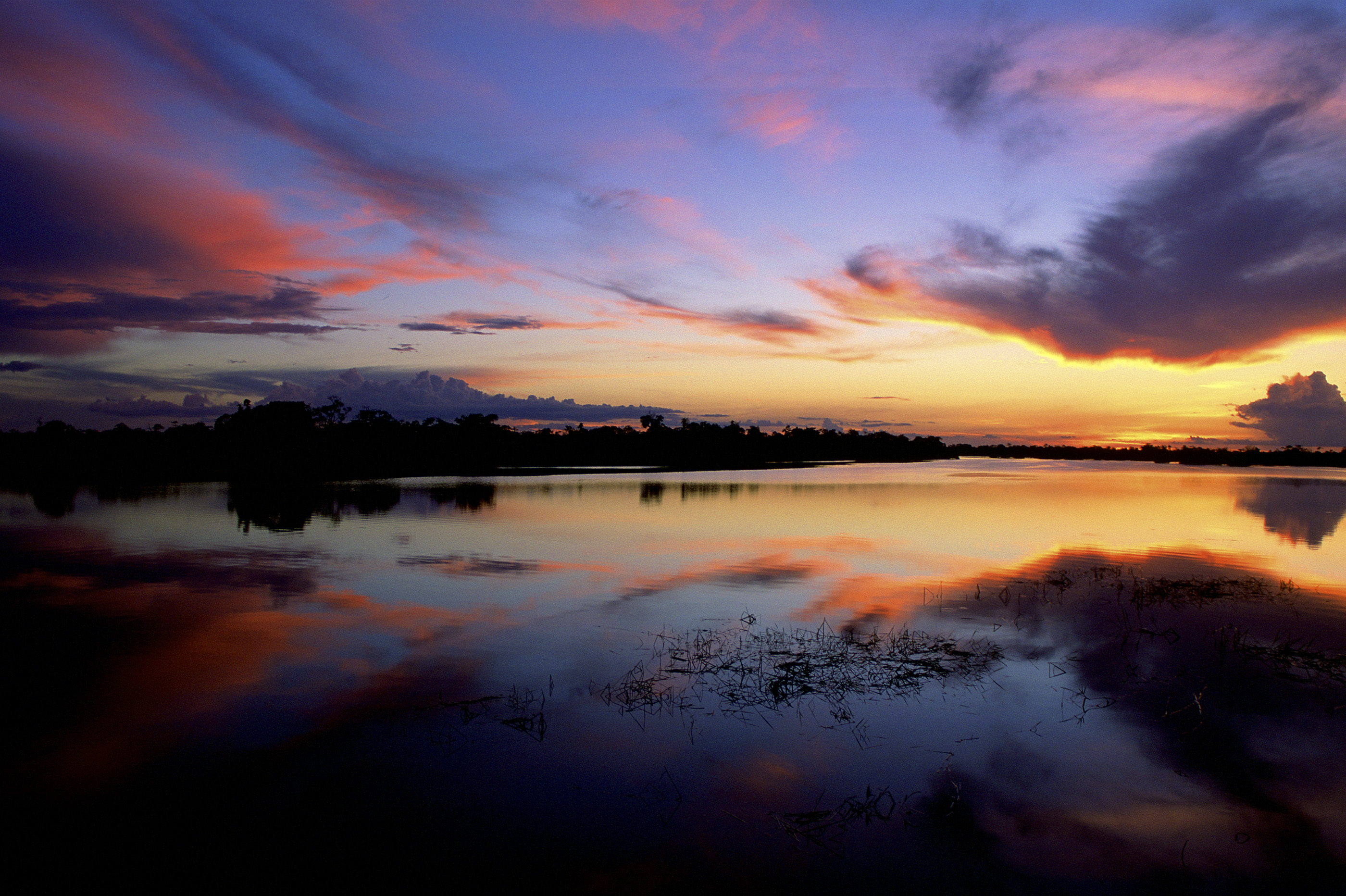
- Flooded forest in the park

- Location within Brazil
- Nearest city: Manaus, Amazonas
- Coordinates: 2.30°S 63.05°W
- Area: 2,367,333 ha (9,140.32 sq mi)
- Designation: National park
- Created: 24 September 1980
- Administrator: ICMBio

UNESCO World Heritage Site
- Part of: Central Amazon Conservation Complex
- Criteria: Natural: ix, x
- Reference: 998-001
- Inscription: 2000 (24th Session)
- Extensions: 2003
- Area: 4,882,000 ha (12,060,000 acres)

The Jaú National Park (Portuguese: Parque Nacional do Jaú) is a national park located in the state of Amazonas, Brazil. It is one of the largest forest reserves in South America, and part of a World Heritage Site.

== Location ==
The name "Jaú" comes from that of one of the largest fish in Brazil, the gilded catfish or jau (Zungaro zungaro), after which the main river of the park is named. The park is in the Amazon biome in the Japurá-Solimões-Negro moist forests ecoregion. It covers an area of 2,367,333 hectares (5,849,810 acres). It was created by decree 85.200 of 24 September 1980. It is administered by the Chico Mendes Institute for Biodiversity Conservation. It covers parts of the municipalities of Barcelos, Codajás and Novo Airão in the state of Amazonas.

The park is one of the largest protected areas in Brazil. It is about 220 kilometres (140 mi) northwest of Manaus and contains the entire Jaú River basin between the Unini River to the north and the Carabinani River to the south. All three rivers flow east to enter the right bank of the Rio Negro. The eastern part of the park adjoins the Rio Unini Extractive Reserve to the north, which runs along the opposite bank of the Unini River. The park is bounded to the northwest by the Amanã Sustainable Development Reserve. To the east, near the Rio Negro, the park adjoins the Rio Negro State Park North Section to the south.

== Environment ==
The park's terrain is representative of the Negro-Solimões interfluvial plateau. It has two main areas: the Trombetas/Negro plateau and the lower western Amazon plateau. The higher area has hills with flat tops at 150 to 200 metres (490 to 660 ft) cut by valleys, while the lower area has altitudes of about 100 metres (330 ft). There are large areas of seasonally flooded land with poor drainage, and some permanent lakes. Average annual rainfall is over 2,500 millimetres (98 in), and the wettest months occur in March and September, when maximum short wave solar radiation is being received and so maximum convectional rainfall occurs. Temperatures range from 22 to 32 °C (72 to 90 °F) with an average of 26 °C (79 °F).

Vegetation types are dense rainforest (77%), open rainforest (14%), transition from rainforest to campinarana (7%) and campinarana (2%). Botanists have catalogued about 400 plant species, several of which are restricted to certain environments such as the uplands and the flooded areas. 263 species of fish have been recorded, some new to science.

== Conservation ==
The park is classed as IUCN protected area category II (national park). The objective is to preserve an Amazonian black water ecosystem for environmental education, interaction with local communities, sustainable tourism and the research. The park is designed as a mega-reserve and world heritage site for present and future generations. Protected species in the park include the margay (Leopardus wiedii), jaguar (Panthera onca), giant otter (Pteronura brasiliensis) and Amazonian manatee (Trichechus inunguis).

Jaú National Park was inscribed by UNESCO as a World Heritage Site in 2000. It became part of the Central Amazon Ecological Corridor, established in 2002. In 2003 the property was expanded by the addition of the Anavilhanas National Park, Amanã Sustainable Development Reserve and Mamirauá Sustainable Development Reserve to form the Central Amazon Conservation Complex, a larger World Heritage Site. The park became part of the Lower Rio Negro Mosaic, created in 2010. The conservation unit is supported by the Amazon Region Protected Areas Program.

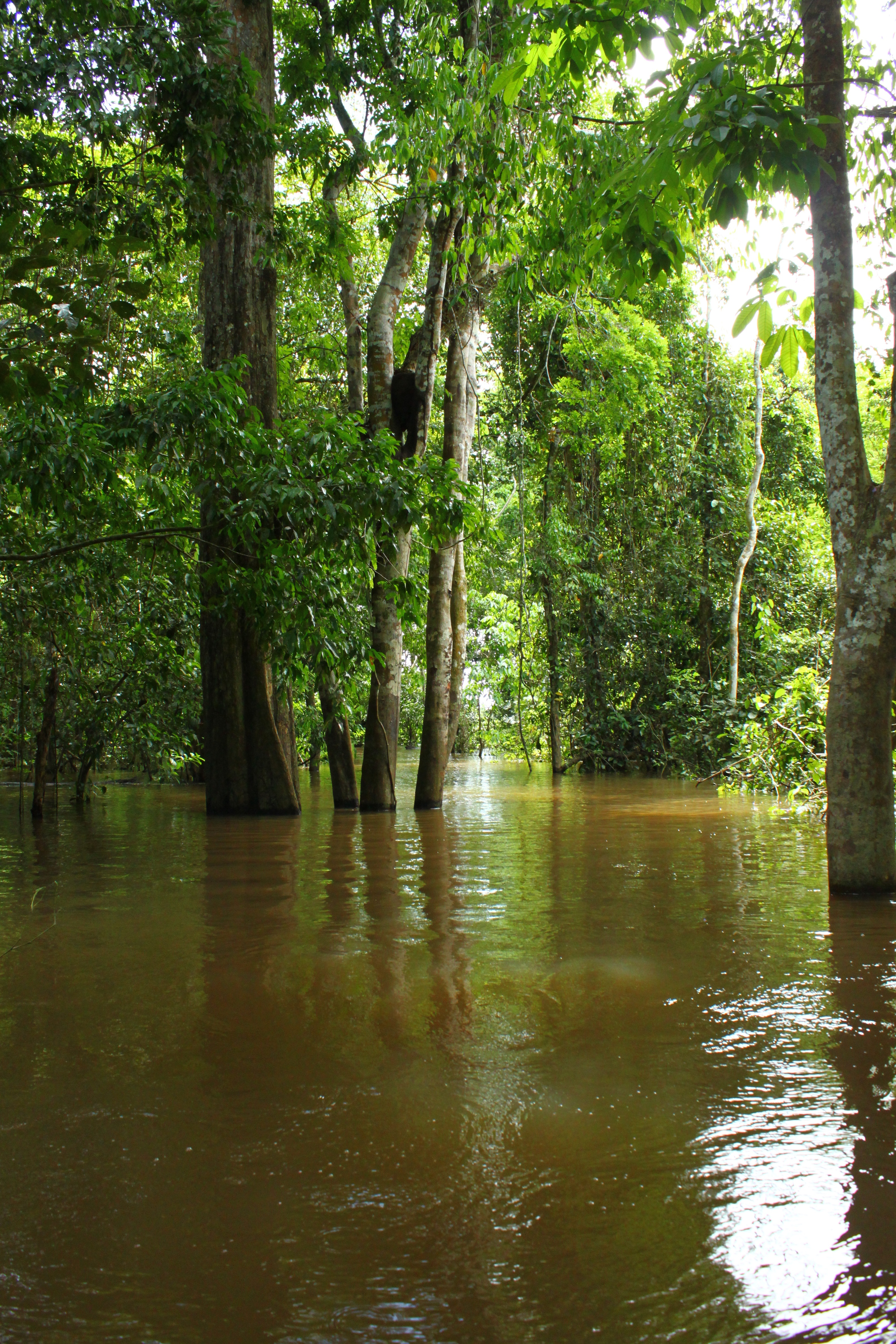
Flooded forest

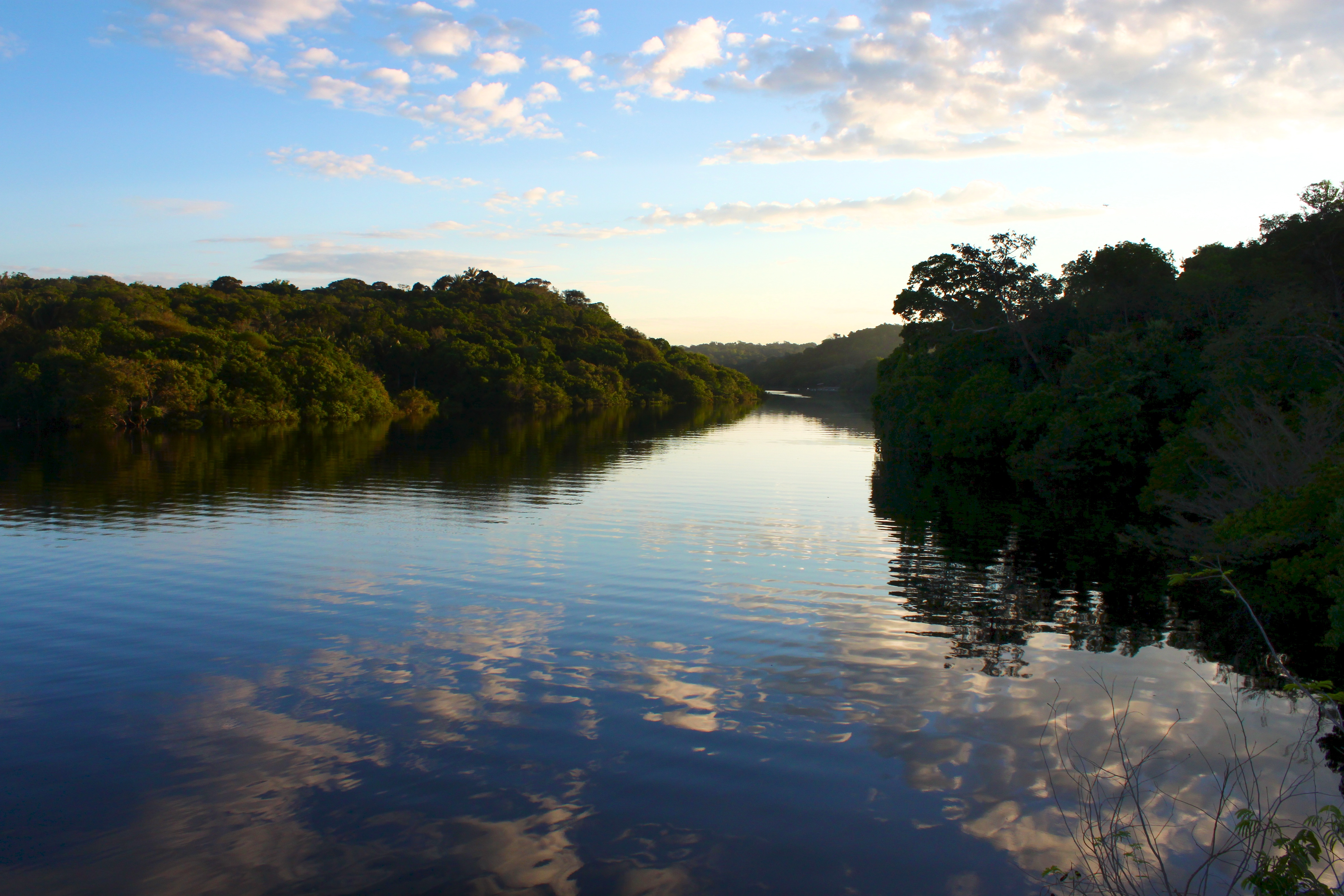
Sunrise over waterway

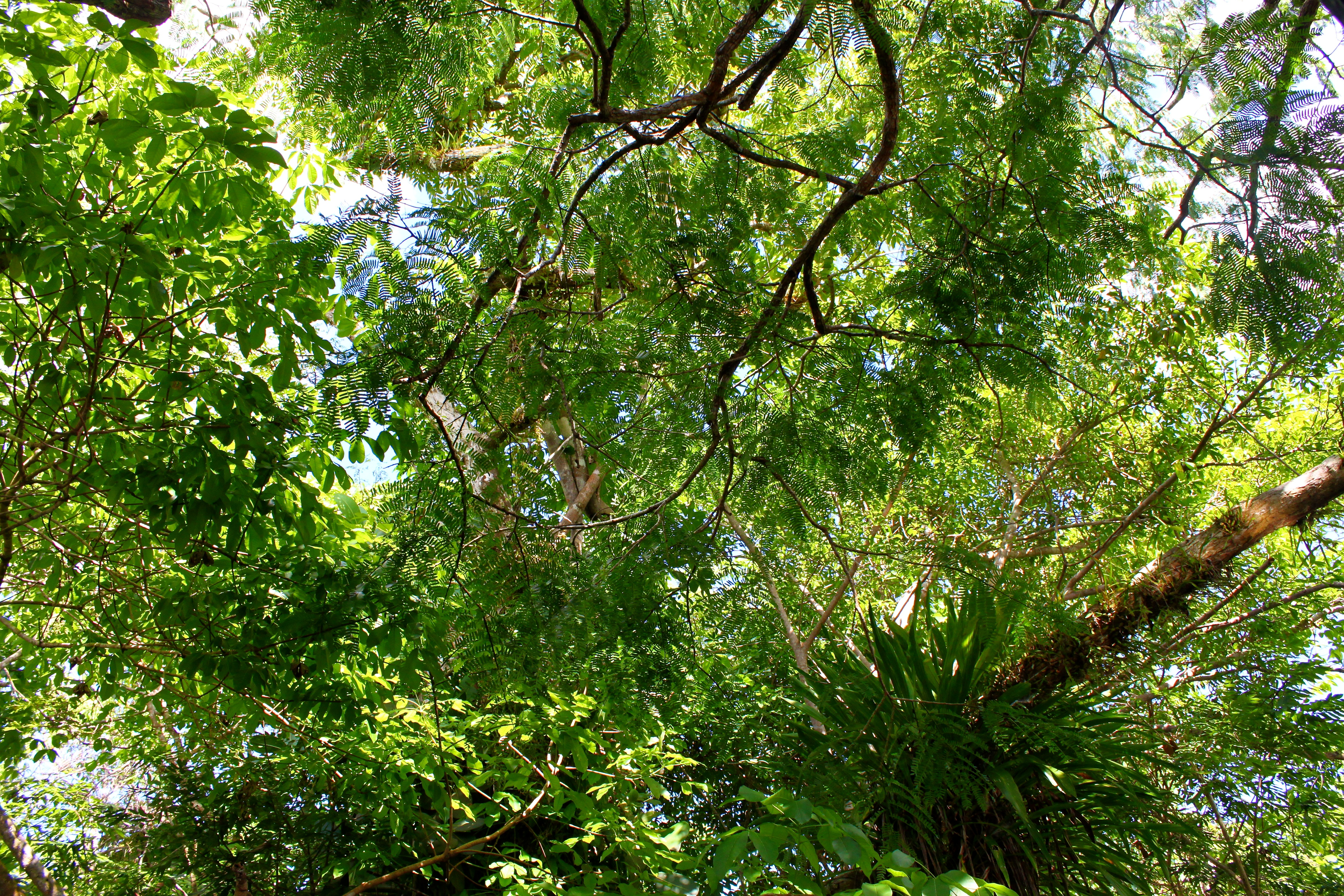
Vegetation

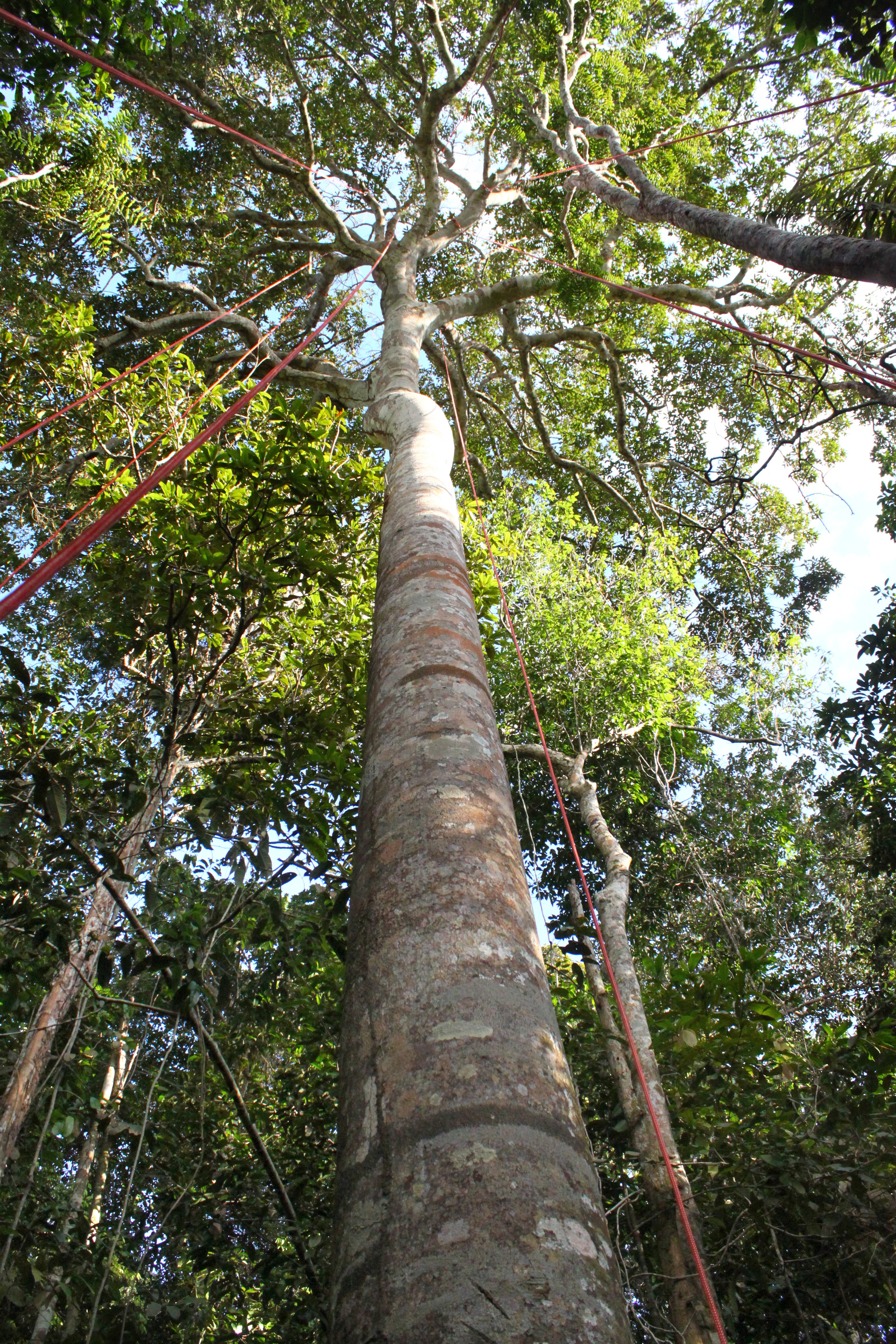
Castanheira with ropes for climbing tourists

== Sources ==
- CEC Central da Amazônia (in Portuguese), ISA: Instituto Socioambiental
- Central Amazon Conservation Complex, UNESCO
- Full list: PAs supported by ARPA, ARPA
- "Japurá-Solimoes-Negro moist forests", Global Species, Myers Enterprises II
- PARNA do Jaú (in Portuguese), ISA: Instituto Socioambiental
- Parque Nacional do Jaú (in Portuguese), Chico Mendes Institute for Biodiversity Conservation, archived from the original on 2016-08-22
- Parque Nacional de Jaú (in Portuguese), Via Rural, archived from the original on 2016-05-09
- Thiago Mota Cardoso (2010), Depoimento: o mosaico do baixo rio Negro (in Portuguese), IPÊ-Instituto de Pesquisas Ecológicas
- Unidade de Conservação: Parque Nacional do Jaú (in Portuguese), MMA: Ministério do Meio Ambiente
