= Codajás =

Municipality of Amazonas, Brazil

- Municipality
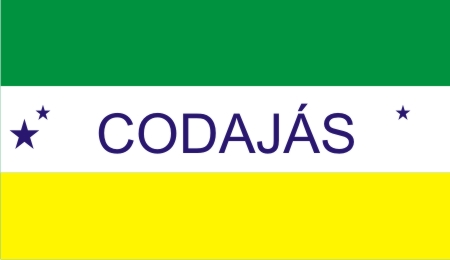
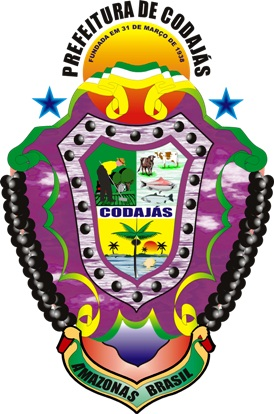
- Flag Coat of arms

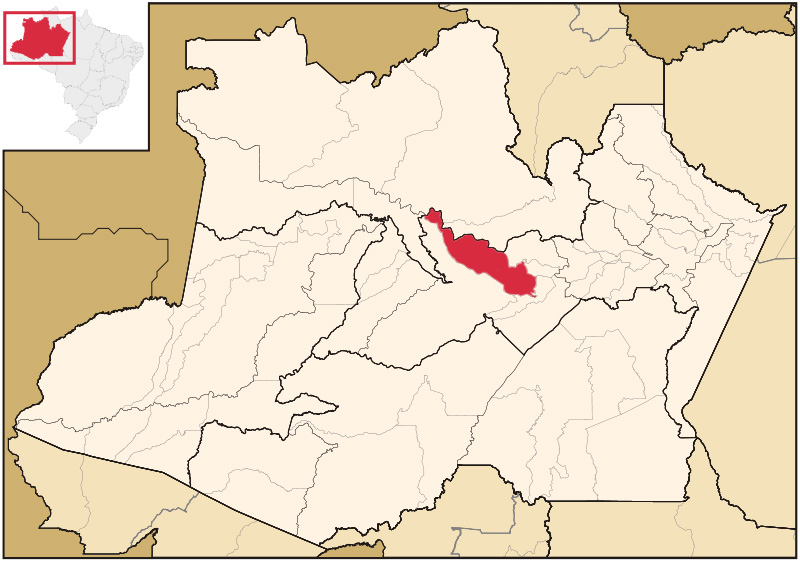
- Location of the municipality inside Amazonas

- Location in Brazil
- Coordinates: 3°50′13″S 62°3′25″W
- Country: Brazil
- Region: North
- State: Amazonas

Area
  - Total: 18,712 km^{2} (7,225 sq mi)

Population (2020)
  - Total: 29,168
  - Density: 1.1/km^{2} (2.8/sq mi)
- Time zone: UTC−4 (AMT)
- Climate: Af
- Website: http://www.ale.am.gov.br/codajas/

Codajás is a municipality located in the Brazilian state of Amazonas. Its population was 29,168 (2020) and its area is 18,712 km^{2}.

== Geography ==
The municipality contains part of the Amanã Sustainable Development Reserve.

=== Climate ===
Climate data for Codajás (1991–2020 normals, extrems 1976–present)
Month	Jan	Feb	Mar	Apr	May	Jun	Jul	Aug	Sep	Oct	Nov	Dec	Year
Record high °C (°F)	37.5 (99.5)	37.0 (98.6)	38.0 (100.4)	36.2 (97.2)	36.1 (97.0)	35.6 (96.1)	36.2 (97.2)	38.2 (100.8)	39.0 (102.2)	38.3 (100.9)	38.6 (101.5)	36.5 (97.7)	39.0 (102.2)
Mean daily maximum °C (°F)	31.8 (89.2)	31.5 (88.7)	31.6 (88.9)	31.4 (88.5)	31.4 (88.5)	31.6 (88.9)	32.3 (90.1)	33.2 (91.8)	33.6 (92.5)	33.4 (92.1)	32.9 (91.2)	32.0 (89.6)	32.2 (90.0)
Daily mean °C (°F)	26.5 (79.7)	26.3 (79.3)	26.2 (79.2)	26.4 (79.5)	26.5 (79.7)	26.3 (79.3)	26.5 (79.7)	26.9 (80.4)	27.1 (80.8)	27.2 (81.0)	27.1 (80.8)	26.5 (79.7)	26.6 (79.9)
Mean daily minimum °C (°F)	23.2 (73.8)	23.0 (73.4)	23.0 (73.4)	23.0 (73.4)	22.9 (73.2)	22.6 (72.7)	22.1 (71.8)	22.2 (72.0)	22.7 (72.9)	23.2 (73.8)	23.4 (74.1)	23.3 (73.9)	22.9 (73.2)
Record low °C (°F)	15.6 (60.1)	13.4 (56.1)	14.5 (58.1)	17.0 (62.6)	17.4 (63.3)	16.0 (60.8)	12.4 (54.3)	14.7 (58.5)	17.1 (62.8)	14.0 (57.2)	16.8 (62.2)	15.8 (60.4)	12.4 (54.3)
Average precipitation mm (inches)	358.1 (14.10)	358.8 (14.13)	435.5 (17.15)	384.8 (15.15)	299.4 (11.79)	160.2 (6.31)	103.6 (4.08)	84.8 (3.34)	119.8 (4.72)	175.6 (6.91)	243.4 (9.58)	367.6 (14.47)	3,091.6 (121.72)
Average precipitation days (≥ 1.0 mm)	21	20	22	19	19	13	10	8	11	13	14	19	189
Average relative humidity (%)	86.6	87.3	87.2	87.4	86.9	85.4	84.8	83.5	83.3	83.9	85.4	86.2	85.7
Mean monthly sunshine hours	138.4	109.7	129.4	128.9	147.8	166.1	216.0	222.2	197.8	180.7	157.3	134.3	1,928.6
Source 1: Instituto Nacional de Meteorologia
Source 2: Meteo Climat (record highs and lows)
