= Tefé =

Municipality of Amazonas, Brazil

Tefé, Amazonas, Brasil
- Municipality
- Municipality of Tefé
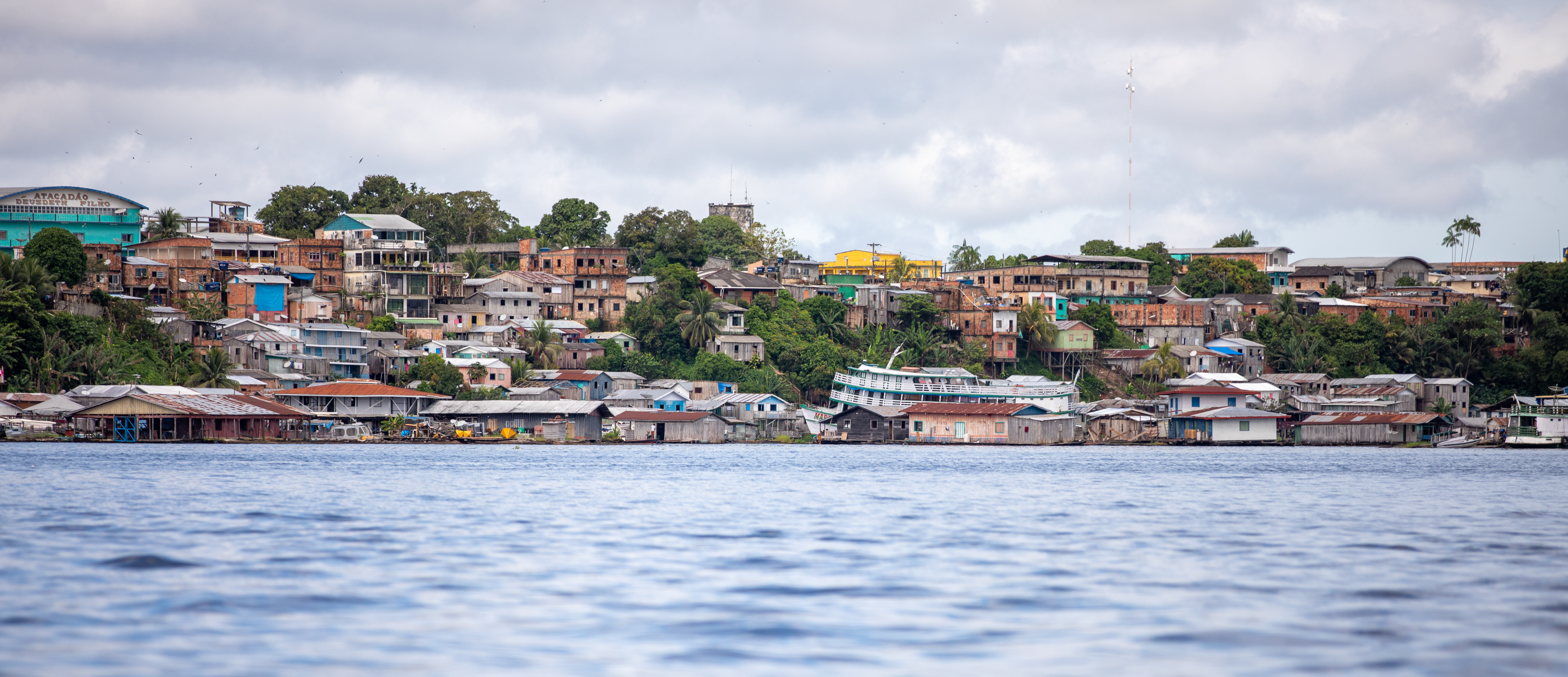
- Tefé, Brazil

- Flag Coat of arms
- Nickname: Princesinha do Rio Solimões ( Princess of the Solimões River in Portuguese)
- Location in Tefé, Amazonas

- Location in Brazil
- Coordinates: 03°21′14″S 64°42′39″W
- Country: Brazil
- Region: North
- State: Amazonas
- Founded: 1759

Government
  - Mayor: Nicson Marreira (PSD)

Area
  - Total: 23,704.426 km^{2} (9,152.330 sq mi)
- Elevation: 75 m (246 ft)

Population (2020)
  - Total: 59,547
  - Density: 2.5121/km^{2} (6.5062/sq mi)
- Time zone: UTC−4 (AMT)
- Demonym: tefeense

Tefé, known in early accounts as Teffé or Ega, is a municipality in the state of Amazonas, northern Brazil.

== History ==
As early as 1620 the Portuguese Carmelites could already boast of converts among the Muras, those natives of the Amazon established around Lake Teffé and on the borders of the neighbouring rivers. Tefé, also called Ega at one time, was the fourth of eight aldeias founded by Carmelite missionaries between 1697 and 1751 (Note: Henry W. Bates in 1851 said the settlement had been inhabited for 170 years, which would place its founding a bit earlier, around 1680.) along the Solimões and Negro Rivers. In 1759 the commandant Joaquim de Mello da Povoas converted the Carmelite mission on Lake Tefé into a town, which he named Ega; it was elevated to a city named Tefé in 1855 (but was known as Tefé before that time). The mission, called Parauarí, was originally established on Ilha dos Veados three leagues from the location on the opposite shore of Lake Tefe, called today by the name of Nogueira. It was abandoned due to a smallpox outbreak in the early 18th century and moved across the lake, where it remains today. (Note: Henry W. Bates gave this description: "[Ega] is built on a small tract of cleared land at the lower or eastern end of the lake...On the opposite shore of the broad expanse stands a small village, called Nogueira".) The survivors were taken to its present site by F. Andre da Costa in 1817.

Henry W. Bates also describes in detail the cultural interactions of the natives with those in the town from his trip in the 1850s. He describes that the natives learned Tupi very quickly, and despite having a very large and diverse array of languages spoken all around the Amazon, Tupi was spoken "with little corruption along the banks of the main Amazons for a distance of 2,500 miles."

In 1910, an apostolic prefecture, the current Prelature of Teffe, was founded by priests of the Congregation of the Holy Spirit.

== Geography ==
Tefé is located about 525 km by air or 595 km by river to the west of Manaus on the south bank of the Rio Solimões (the upper Amazon), on the lake formed by the mouth of the Tefé River. The nearest large city is Coari, 192 km SE by east of Tefé.

The municipal seat of Tefé is the largest town and commercial center of the middle Solimões region. Its population was 59,547 evenly divided between urban and rural, and its area is 23,704 km^{2} (9,152 sq mi). There are no roads into Tefé and the only access is by river boat or plane. By fast boat it is about 12 hours from Manaus. Azul Brazilian Airlines and Voepass operate flights from Manaus to Tefé Airport.

The city is the home of the Territorial Prelature of Tefé. Tefé is also the major starting point for trips into the Mamiraua Reserve.

The municipality is in the Juruá-Purus moist forests ecoregion. It contains 46% of the Tefé National Forest, created in 1989. The municipality contains 33.85% of the 217,486-hectare (537,420-acre) Catuá-Ipixuna Extractive Reserve, established in 2003 as the first extractive reserve in the state of Amazonas.

=== Climate ===
Climate data for Tefé (1981–2010, extremes 1969–present)
Month	Jan	Feb	Mar	Apr	May	Jun	Jul	Aug	Sep	Oct	Nov	Dec	Year
Record high °C (°F)	37.4 (99.3)	39.7 (103.5)	37.2 (99.0)	36.4 (97.5)	36.0 (96.8)	36.8 (98.2)	37.4 (99.3)	37.6 (99.7)	38.6 (101.5)	38.2 (100.8)	37.6 (99.7)	37.6 (99.7)	39.7 (103.5)
Mean daily maximum °C (°F)	32.1 (89.8)	32.1 (89.8)	32.3 (90.1)	32.1 (89.8)	31.7 (89.1)	31.7 (89.1)	32.2 (90.0)	33.0 (91.4)	33.4 (92.1)	33.3 (91.9)	32.8 (91.0)	32.5 (90.5)	32.4 (90.3)
Daily mean °C (°F)	26.6 (79.9)	26.5 (79.7)	26.7 (80.1)	26.7 (80.1)	26.5 (79.7)	26.3 (79.3)	26.4 (79.5)	27.0 (80.6)	27.3 (81.1)	27.1 (80.8)	27.1 (80.8)	26.8 (80.2)	26.8 (80.2)
Mean daily minimum °C (°F)	22.6 (72.7)	22.6 (72.7)	22.5 (72.5)	22.7 (72.9)	22.7 (72.9)	22.1 (71.8)	21.9 (71.4)	22.2 (72.0)	22.3 (72.1)	22.5 (72.5)	22.7 (72.9)	22.6 (72.7)	22.5 (72.5)
Record low °C (°F)	18.0 (64.4)	15.8 (60.4)	18.2 (64.8)	18.9 (66.0)	18.4 (65.1)	14.6 (58.3)	14.9 (58.8)	15.4 (59.7)	18.8 (65.8)	19.4 (66.9)	18.8 (65.8)	19.0 (66.2)	14.6 (58.3)
Average precipitation mm (inches)	274.2 (10.80)	247.1 (9.73)	306.5 (12.07)	297.1 (11.70)	254.3 (10.01)	158.2 (6.23)	120.5 (4.74)	96.4 (3.80)	132.9 (5.23)	160.3 (6.31)	181.0 (7.13)	217.2 (8.55)	2,445.7 (96.29)
Average precipitation days (≥ 1.0 mm)	18	17	18	19	17	14	11	9	11	12	13	16	175
Average relative humidity (%)	90.0	89.0	89.4	89.9	90.8	89.0	88.1	86.8	86.6	87.5	88.2	89.2	88.7
Mean monthly sunshine hours	140.2	112.3	127.5	125.2	130.9	142.5	181.0	191.8	180.2	170.3	148.3	140.9	1,791.1
Source 1: Instituto Nacional de Meteorologia
Source 2: Meteo Climat (record highs and lows)
