= Japurá River =

Caquetá River Japurá River
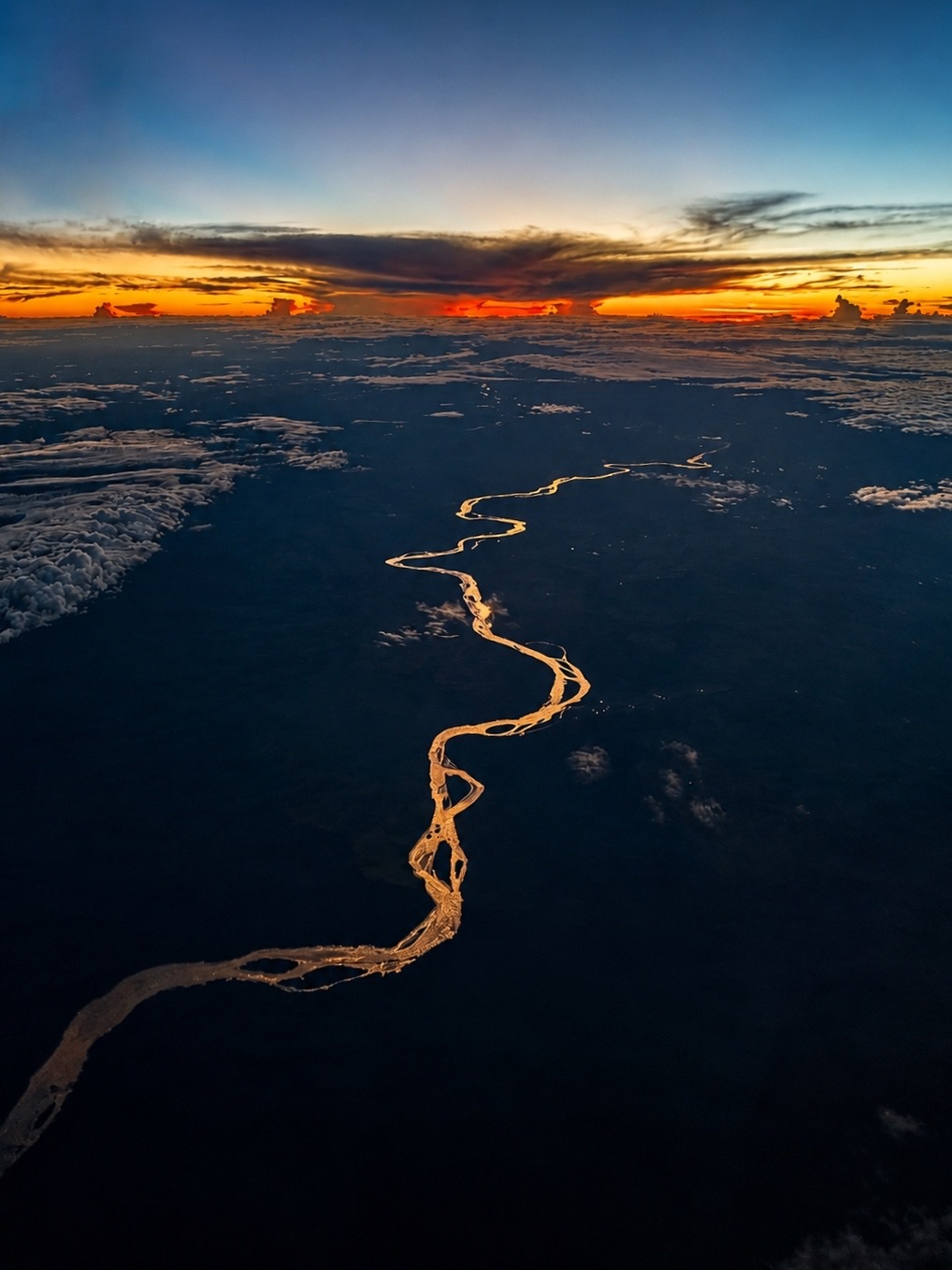
- Aerial view of the Caquetá River in Colombia

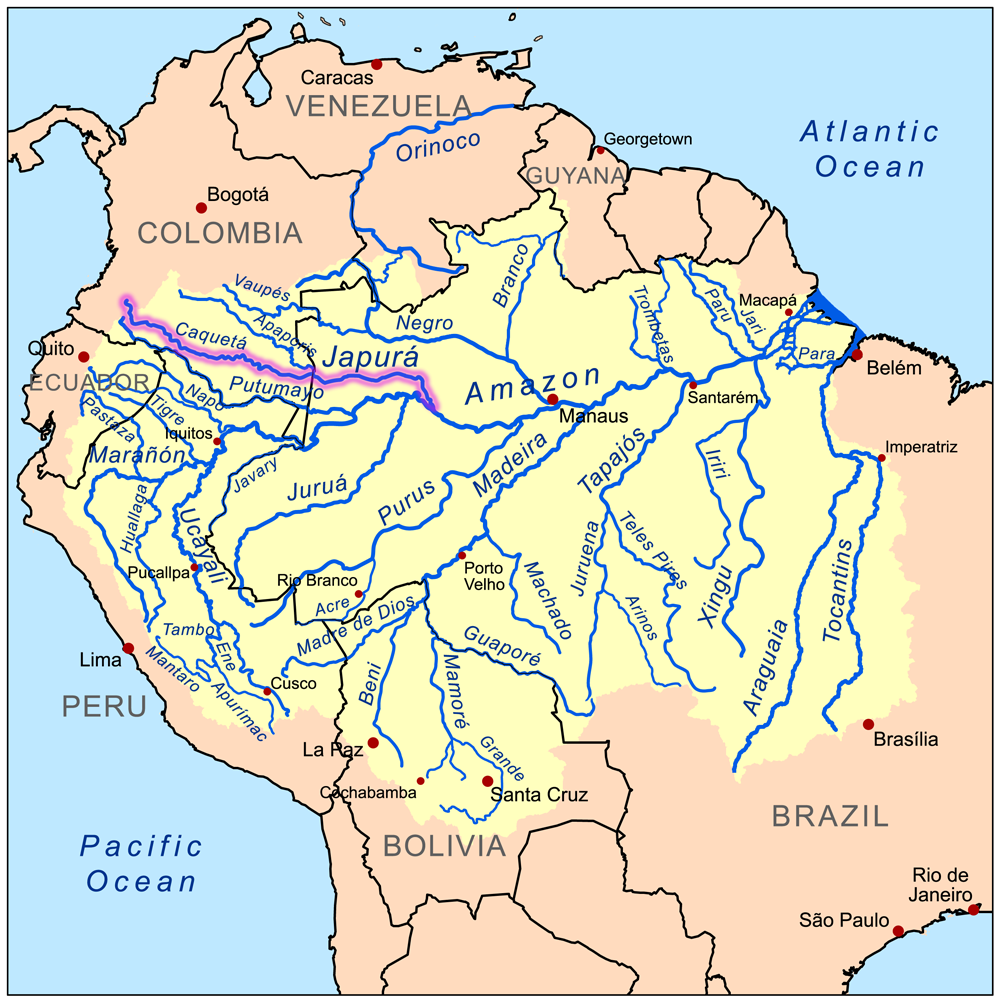
- Map of the Amazon Basin with the Japurá River highlighted

Location
- Countries: Brazil; Colombia

Physical characteristics
- Mouth: Amazon River
  - coordinates: 3°9′56″S 64°46′51″W
- Length: 2,036 km (1,265 mi)
- Basin size: 276,812 km^{2} (106,878 mi^{2})
- Discharge
  - location: Confluence of Solimões (Amazon), Brazil
  - average: (Period: 1979–2015)18,121.6 m^{3}/s (639,960 cu ft/s)
- Discharge
  - location: Vila Bittencourt, Amazonas State (736 km upstream of mouth - Basin size: 199,090 km^{2} (76,870 sq mi)
  - average: 13,758 m^{3}/s (485,900 cu ft/s)
  - minimum: 2,000 m^{3}/s (71,000 cu ft/s)
  - maximum: 33,400 m^{3}/s (1,180,000 cu ft/s)
- Discharge
  - location: La Pedrera, Colombia (Basin size: 144,098 km^{2} (55,637 sq mi)
  - average: 9,937 m^{3}/s (350,900 cu ft/s) (Period: 1991–2020)10,273 m^{3}/s (362,800 cu ft/s)
  - minimum: 1,800 m^{3}/s (64,000 cu ft/s)
  - maximum: 19,800 m^{3}/s (700,000 cu ft/s)
- Discharge
  - location: Guaquira, Colombia (Basin size: 53,636 km^{2} (20,709 sq mi)
  - average: 3,717 m^{3}/s (131,300 cu ft/s)
  - minimum: 790 m^{3}/s (28,000 cu ft/s)
  - maximum: 7,900 m^{3}/s (280,000 cu ft/s)

Basin features
- Tributaries
  - left: Apaporis, Yarí, Caguán, Orteguaza
  - right: Auati-Paraná, Mapari, Jupari, Purui, Miriti-Paraná, Cahuinari

The Japurá River or Caquetá River is a 2,820 kilometres (1,750 mi) long river in the Amazon basin. It rises in Colombia and flows eastward through Brazil to join the Amazon River.

== Course ==
The river rises as the Caquetá River in the Andes in southwest Colombia. The Caquetá River rises near the sources of the Magdalena River, and augments its volume from many branches as it courses through Colombia. It flows southeast into Brazil, where it is called the Japurá. The Japurá enters the Amazon River through a network of channels. It is navigable by small boats in Brazil. West of the Rio Negro, the Solimões River (as the Amazon's upper Brazilian course is called) receives three more imposing streams from the northwest—the Japurá, the Içá (referred to as the Putumayo before it crosses over into Brazil), and the Napo.

=== Brazilian Course ===
On the border with Brazil, it meets the long Apaporis River (which is 1,370 km long when combined with one of its sources, the Tunia River), near the town of La Pedrera. It then enters Brazilian territory, in the Amazon, where it is known as the Japurá River. In its lower course, it is joined by the Auati Paraná and Mirim Pirajuana rivers (the latter is sometimes considered a secondary branch, or a dead or backwater of the river).

The Caquetá-Japurá is a "white water" river, which, like all rivers descending from the Andes, carries a significant alluvial load that it partly deposits when joining the Solimões (Amazon) River on its left bank. This is why the accumulated sediments on the banks have shaped a complex mouth that stretches for several hundred kilometers. Firstly, the Japurá receives a long bifurcation from the Solimões itself and then drains into it through a main mouth located opposite the city of Tefé. However, a secondary branch, the Paraná Copea, continues its winding course until it rejoins the Solimões River 300 km downstream. This multiple confluence (resembling a very elongated delta) complicates the measurement of the length of the Caquetá-Japurá, which varies, depending on the method used, from 2200 to 2800 km, especially because the boundaries between the basins of other tributaries and sub-tributaries of the Amazon system are unclear in this flat, flooded, and swampy area. Some tributaries of the Japurá River originate very close to the Solimões River (Auati Paraná River), and some tributaries of the Negro River arise near the Japurá (Uneiuxi, Cuiuni, and Unini rivers), with connections and bifurcations between them during flood seasons.

Although the Caquetá/Japurá is a broad and voluminous river, the existence of numerous rapids throughout its course has significantly hindered navigation.

== History ==
Slave raids against the indigenous people of the Caqueta/Japurá River valley had persisted for at least 100 years prior to Roger Casement's investigation of the Putumayo genocide in 1910. While citing a book published by English lieutenant Henry Lister Maw, Casement noted that these slave raids had been continued by Brazilian and Portuguese men. The territory of the Peruvian Amazon Company extended between the Putumayo and Japurá Rivers during the rubber boom.

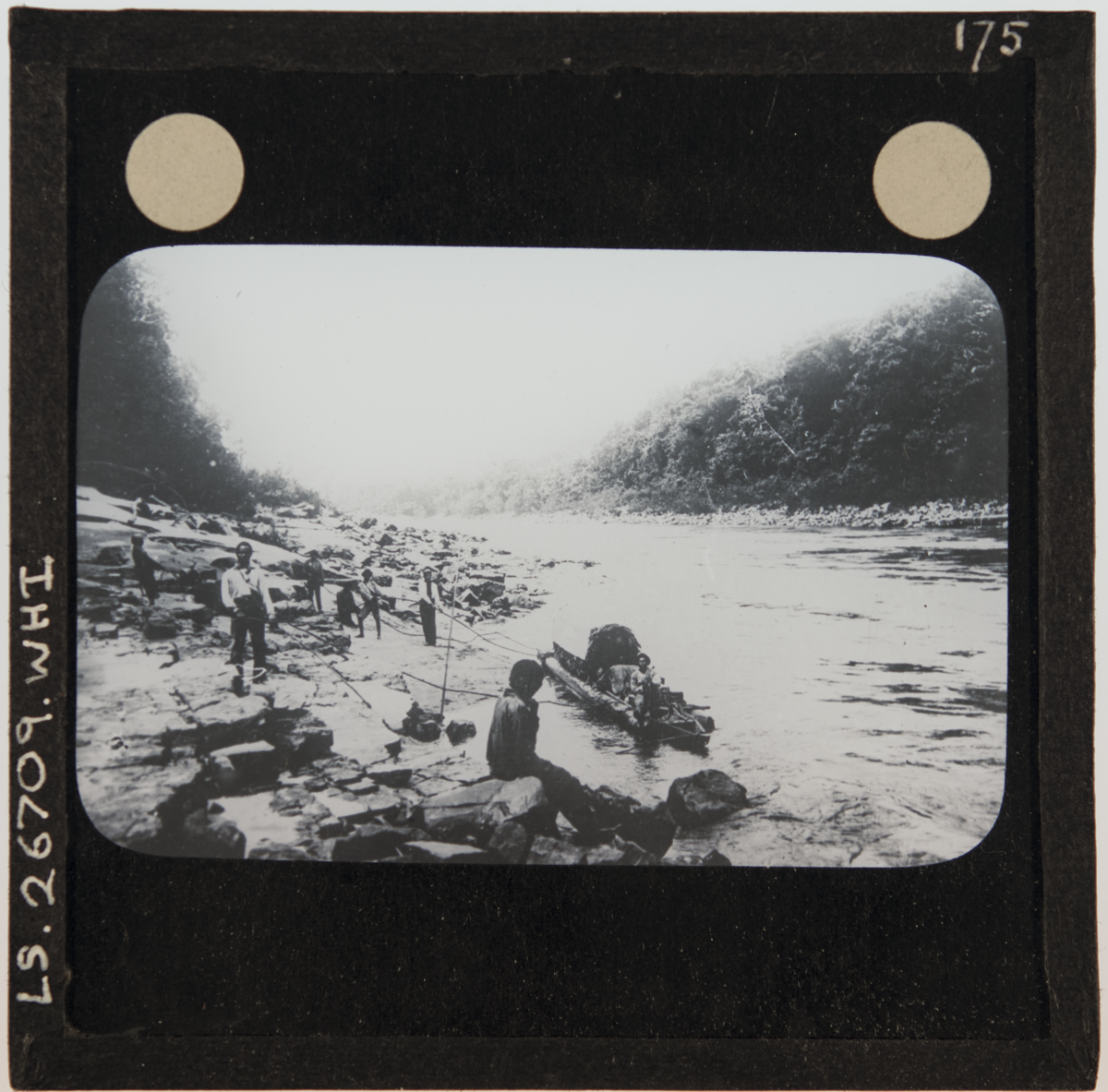
"Robuchon’s party at the fatal rapids. Japura River."

Many of the indigenous nations between these rivers were enslaved by the Peruvian Amazon Company, which was originally founded by the Peruvian rubber baron Julio César Arana. Near the Caqueta River, the Andoque, Boras, Muinane, Manuya, Recigaro and other nations were forced to extract rubber at the Peruvian Amazon Company's stations. The Andoque workforce was largely based around the Matanzas rubber station, managed by the infamous Armando Normand . The Boras people were primarily dedicated to rubber extraction around the stations of Abisinia, Santa Catalina and La Sabana correspondingly managed by Abelardo Agüero, Arístides Rodríguez and his brother Aurelio. Several writers that were contemporary to the rubber boom, including Roger Casement, noted that the Boras and Andoques nations were more resistant to enslavement and attempts by rubber tappers to conquer them. Joseph R. Woodroffe believed that their resistance resulted in those two indigenous nations suffering the most under the Peruvian Amazon Company's management and the near extinction of those two groups by 1910. Hundreds of indigenous people died while subjected to the Peruvian Amazon Company agents at Matanzas, La Sabana and Santa Catalina.

== Environment ==
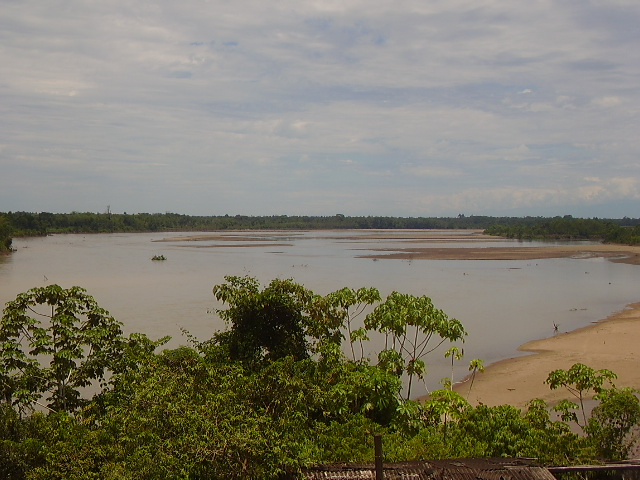
Banks of the Caquetá River

For much of its length the river flows through the Purus várzea ecoregion. The river is home to a wide variety of fish and reptiles, including enormous catfish weighing up to 91 kg (201 lb) and measuring up to 1.8 metres (5.9 ft) in length, electric eels, piranhas, turtles, and caimans.

Much of the jungle through which the eastern Caquetá originally flowed has been cleared for pasture, crops of rice, corn, manioc, and sugar cane, and in the past two decades, particularly coca crops.

== Navigation ==
The 19th-century Brazilian historian and geographer José Coelho da Gama e Abreu, the Baron of Marajó, attributed 970 kilometres (600 mi) of navigable stretches to it. Jules Crevaux, who descended it, described it as full of obstacles to navigation, the current very strong and the stream frequently interrupted by rapids and cataracts. It was initially supposed to have eight mouths, but colonial administrator Francisco Xavier Ribeiro Sampaio, in the historic report of his voyage of 1774, determined that there was but one real mouth, and that the supposed others are all furos or canos, as the diverting secondary channels of the Amazonian rivers are known.

In 1864–1868, the Brazilian government made a somewhat careful examination of the Brazilian part of the river, as far up as the rapid of Cupati. Several very easy and almost complete water routes exist between the Japurá and Negro across the low, flat intervening country. The Baron of Marajó wrote that there were six of them, and one which connects the upper Japurá with the Vaupés branch of the Negro; thus the indigenous tribes of the respective valleys have easy contact with each other.

The river serves as a principal means of transportation, being plied by tiny dugout canoes, larger ones, motorboats, and riverboats known locally as lanchas. The boats carry a multitude of cargoes, sometimes being chartered, sometimes even being traveling general stores. In the Colombian section, the presence of guerrillas and soldiers used to limit river traffic.

== In popular culture ==
- The Japurá River is the namesake of the main Earth Federation base in the Mobile Suit Gundam television series, transliterated as "Jaburo."

== See also ==
- Caquetá Department
