= Solimões River =

Name in Brazil for the upper Amazon River

Coordinates: 04°38′09″S 70°15′57″W

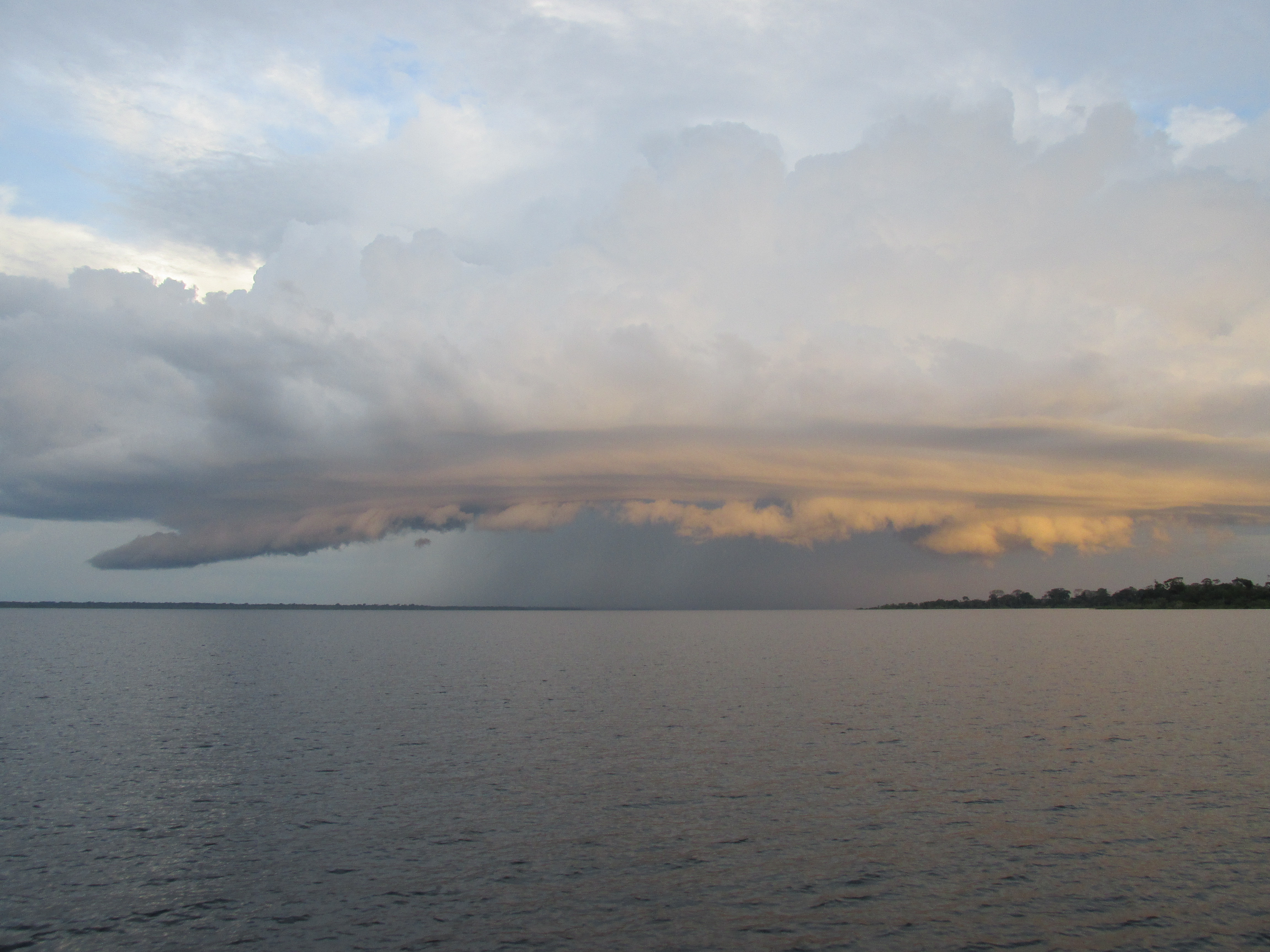
View of Solimões river.

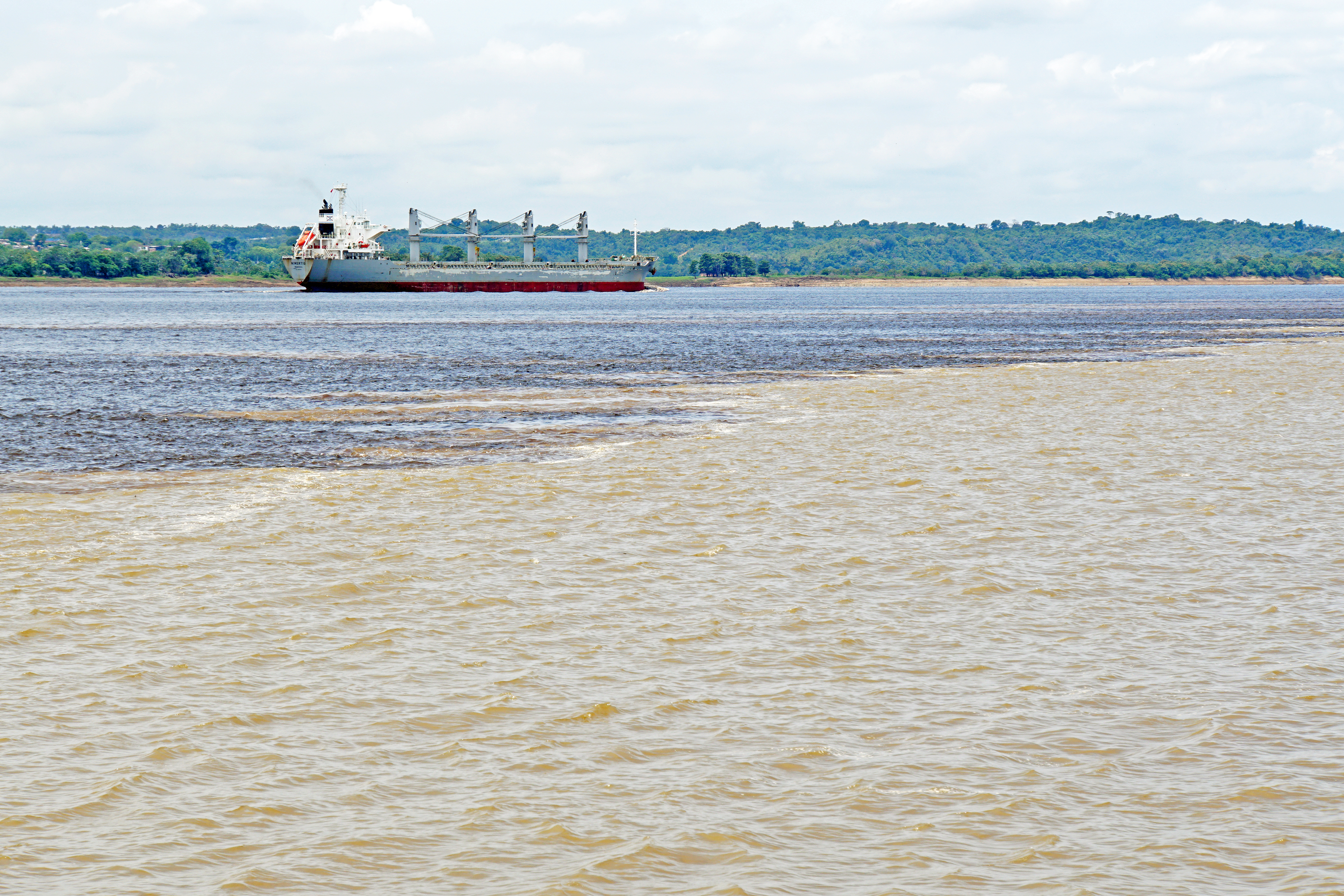
Meeting of the Solimões River and the Rio Negro (dark)

Solimões (Portuguese pronunciation: [soliˈmõjs]) is the name often given to upper stretches of the Amazon River in Brazil from its confluence with the Rio Negro upstream to the border of Peru. The Solimões flows for about 1,600 km (1,000 miles) through a floodplain about 80 km (50 miles) wide.

== Geography ==
The Amazon / Solimões river just above the confluence of the Solimões and Rio Negro is already by far the largest river in the world, even though its two largest tributaries (the Negro and the Madeira River) have not yet contributed to the flow volume.

The Solimões portion of the Amazon River lies entirely in the state of Amazonas, Brazil, and some portion of the state is often referred to as the "Solimões region". The ecoregion of the Solimões River drainage basin is entirely tropical rainforest.

== Etymology ==
An Amazonian aboriginal nation called Soriman was corrupted in Portuguese to Solimão and Soliemoens, from which the name of this section of the river and the region it drains is derived.

Use of the name Solimões for the upper Amazon is mostly confined to Brazilian speakers of Portuguese; the rest of the world refers to both the upper and lower portions of the river as the Amazon.

== See also ==
- Marañón River
- List of rivers of Amazonas
