= Guianan Highlands moist forests =

Type of plant habitat

Guayanan Highlands moist forests
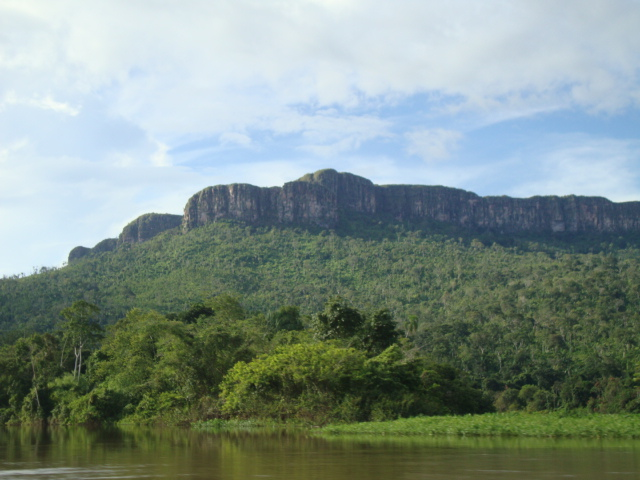
- Cerro Maweti and Ocamo River

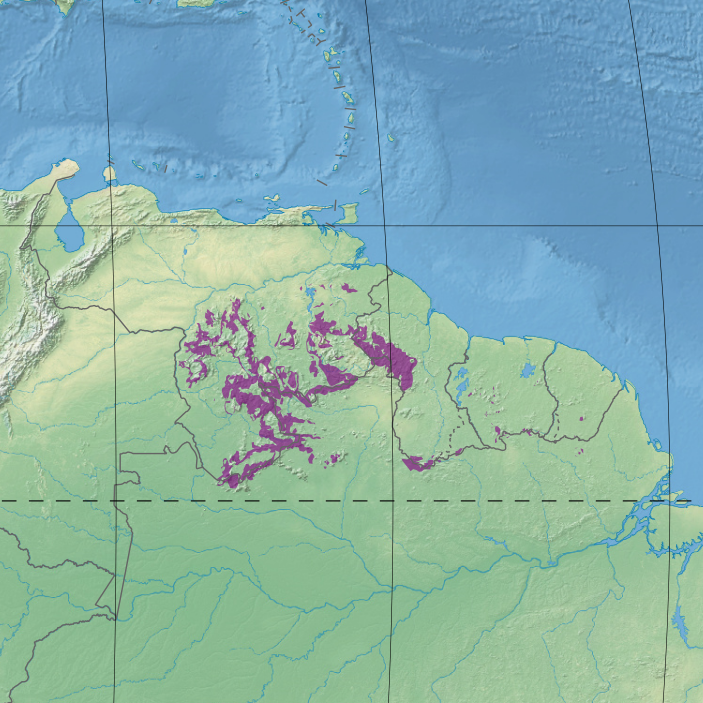
- Ecoregion territory (in purple)

Ecology
- Realm: Neotropical
- Biome: Tropical and subtropical moist broadleaf forests

Geography
- Area: 337,475.45 km^{2} (130,300.00 mi^{2})
- Countries: Venezuela, Brazil, Guyana, Colombia, Suriname, French Guiana
- Coordinates: 4.227°N 64.068°W

Conservation
- Global 200: Guayanan Highlands Forests

The Guayanan Highlands moist forests (NT0124) is an ecoregion in the south of Venezuela, the north of Brazil, and also within Guyana, Suriname, and French Guiana. It is in the Amazon biome. It encompasses an upland region with diverse fauna and flora, which contains dramatic tepuis, or sandstone table mountains. The region has been inaccessible in the past and is generally fairly intact, apart from the north and northeast where large scale agriculture, ranching and mining operations are steadily encroaching on the ecosystem. New roads are opening the interior to logging, and planned dams will have a drastic impact on the riparian zones.

== Location ==
The ecoregion includes parts of southern Venezuela, western and southern Guyana and northern Brazil, with scattered portions in Suriname and French Guiana. It extends into eastern Colombia. It has a total area of 33,747,545 hectares (83,392,000 acres). The ecoregion lies on the Guiana Shield, an ancient upland area between the Amazon and Orinoco basins. It is surrounded by lowland grassy savannas and lowland forest. All areas of the ecoregion contains enclaves of the Pantepuis ecoregion on the tops of table mountains.

Most areas of the ecoregion in the east are surrounded by the Guianan moist forests ecoregion, and most areas in the west are surrounded by the Guianan piedmont and lowland moist forests ecoregion. Sections of the ecoregion in the east border the Uatuma-Trombetas moist forests to the south. The central part of the ecoregion surrounds the northern part of the largest section of the Guianan savanna ecoregion The southwestern part of the ecoregion rises above the Negro-Branco moist forests ecoregion. The Guayanan Highlands moist forests and the Tepuis together make up the Guayanan Highlands Forests Global 200 ecoregion.

== Physical ==
The terrain is rugged, with elevations in the ecoregion from 500 to 1,500 metres (1,600 to 4,900 ft) above sea level. Taller table mountains in the region rise to elevations of 3,000 metres (9,800 ft) and host the Tepui ecoregion. The Guayanan Highlands ecoregion is an "island" of higher land surrounded by lower grasslands and forests collectively known as the Guiana Shield. Most of the land drains into the Orinoco through the Ventuari, Caroní, Paragua and Caura rivers in Venezuela. In the south, it is drained by the Uraricoera and Branco rivers in Brazil into the Amazon.

The upland terraces and mountains consist mainly of quartzitic or sandstone rocks, with granitic rock in some areas. The lowland plains are recent, formerly flooded by lakes or by the sea. Most of the landscape is forest-covered rolling peneplains and floodplains. The undulating peneplains between the Caura and Paragua rivers hold low hills up to 500 metres (1,600 ft) high. There are scattered upland areas of undulating plains, rounded hills, low mountains and Tepuis up to 1,500 metres (4,900 ft) high, and the lower slopes of the higher tepuis. Soils are mostly sandy and low in nutrients.

== Ecology ==
The Guianan Highlands moist forests ecoregion is in the Neotropical realm and the tropical and subtropical moist broadleaf forests biome.

=== Climate ===
The Köppen climate classification is "Am": equatorial, monsoonal. Temperatures vary little throughout the year. Yearly average temperatures range from a minimum of 18 °C (64 °F) to a maximum of 29 °C (84 °F), with a mean of 23 °C (73 °F). Annual rainfall varies considerably, but in some areas averages 3,750 millimetres (148 in). Monthly rainfall is lowest in January at 68.5 millimetres (2.70 in) and highest in July at 537 millimetres (21.1 in).

=== Flora ===
There are various habitats including large areas of tall primary rainforest, open savannas and gallery forests. The peneplains hold evergreen forests with dense canopies of 30 to 40 metres (98 to 131 ft) with emergent trees in the Calophyllum, Anacardium, Manilkara, Protium, Inga, Parkia, Copaifera, Erythrina and Dipteryx genera. Common trees on the plains include Micropholis melinoniana, Dacryodes species, Euterpe precatoria and Quassia cedron. There are fewer emergent trees in the hilly areas, where tree species include Newtonia suaveolens, Couratari guanensis, Alexa species, Euterpe precatoria and Micrandra minor.

The seasonally flooded forests along the rivers have similar formations of flora to the Amazon region. Common tree species on the upper Orinoco include Combretum frangulifolium, Gustavia augusta, Pterocarpus sp., Pterocarpus dubius, Albizia corymbosa, Spondias mombin, Mabea nitida, Eschweilera tenuifolia, Astrocaryum aculeatum and Inga species. Floodplain trees include Caryocar microcarpum, Caraipa densifolia, Macrolobium acaciaefolium, Abuta grandfolia and Panopsis rubescens.

=== Fauna ===
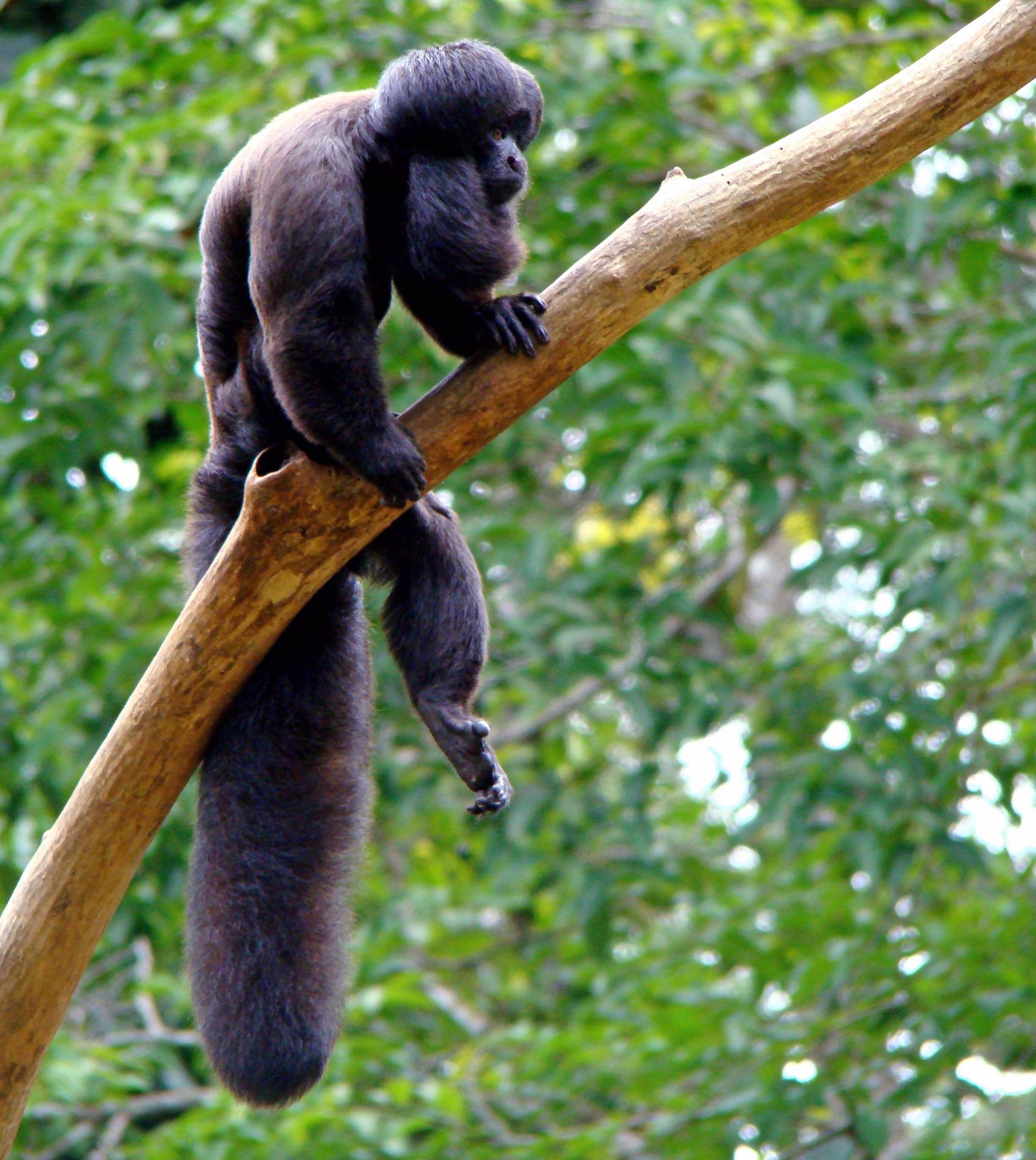
The black bearded saki (Chiropotes satanas) is endangered.

209 species of mammals have been recorded, including jaguar (Panthera onca), cougar (Puma concolor), South American tapir (Tapirus terrestris), white-lipped peccary (Tayassu pecari), collared peccary (Pecari tajacu), brocket deer (Mazama genus), white-eared opossum (Didelphis albiventris), big lutrine opossum (Lutreolina crassicaudata), Robinson's mouse opossum (Marmosa robinsoni), Davy's naked-backed bat (Pteronotus davyi), Fernandez's sword-nosed bat (Lonchorhina fernandezi), highland yellow-shouldered bat (Sturnira ludovici), eastern lowland olingo (Bassaricyon alleni), fiery squirrel (Sciurus flammifer), Guyanan spiny rat (Proechimys hoplomyoides) and Orinoco agouti (Dasyprocta guamara). Endangered mammals include black bearded saki (Chiropotes satanas), Fernandez's sword-nosed bat (Lonchorhina fernandezi) and giant otter (Pteronura brasiliensis).

Snakes include fer-de-lance (Bothrops asper), palm pit-vipers (Bothriechis genus), coral snakes (Micrurus genus), boa constrictors (Boa constrictor) and bushmasters (Lachesis muta). There are many green iguanas (Iguana iguana) and tegus lizards (Tupinambis genus). Endangered amphibians include the demonic poison frog (Minyobates steyermarki).

631 species of birds have been recorded, including white-cheeked pintail (Anas bahamensis), aplomado falcon (Falco femoralis), brown-throated parakeet (Eupsittula pertinax), pavonine cuckoo (Dromococcyx pavoninus), Middle American screech owl (Megascops guatemalae), burrowing owl (Athene cunicularia), emeralds and hummingbirds in the Amazilia genus, chestnut-tipped toucanet (Aulacorhynchus derbianus), smoke-colored pewee (Contopus fumigatus), orange-crowned oriole (Icterus auricapillus), grey seedeater (Sporophila intermedia), two-banded warbler (Myiothlypis bivittata) and black-backed water tyrant (Fluvicola albiventer). Endangered birds include the yellow-bellied seedeater (Sporophila nigricollis).

== Status ==
The World Wildlife Fund classes the ecoregion as "Relatively Stable/Intact". The interior forests have been inaccessible in the past and are generally intact, although roads are being built that open them up to logging. Logging is illegal in the state of Amazonas, Venezuela, but continues elsewhere. Legal and illegal mining for gold, diamonds, bauxite, and iron ore are a serious threat. Near urban centers in the north and northeast of the ecoregion the habitat is steadily being destroyed by large-scale agriculture, cattle ranching and mining. Planned hydroelectric dams on the Caroni and Paragua rivers would flood huge areas with devastating effect on the riparian habitats.

Part of UNESCO's Alto Orinoco-Casiquiare Biosphere Reserve lies in the ecoregion. Protected areas include the El Caura Forest Reserve, Imataca Forest Reserve, Kaieteur National Park, Canaima National Park, and Kanuku Mountains. The Canaima National Park protects an area of 30,000 square kilometres (12,000 sq mi). There are other national parks, but they are not well funded. The Pico da Neblina National Park in Brazil and the Parima Tapirapecó and Serranía de la Neblina national parks in Venezuela cover 40,000 square kilometres (15,000 sq mi) in total. There are many smaller conservation units in the region, but they mainly protect the upper levels of the tepuis.

== Sources ==
- "Guayanan Highlands Forests", WWF Global, World Wide Fund For Nature
- "Guianan Highlands moist forests", Global Species, Myers Enterprises II
- Sears, Robin, South America: Southern Venezuela, northern Brazil, western Guyana, and eastern Colombia (NT0124), WWF: World Wildlife Fund
- Protected Areas Commission (2015). "Kanuku Mountains Protected Area Management Plan" (PDF). Ministry of Natural Resources of Guyana.
- WildFinder, WWF: World Wildlife Fund
