= Negro–Branco moist forests =

Tropical broadleaf forest covering portions of Venezuela, Colombia, and Brazil

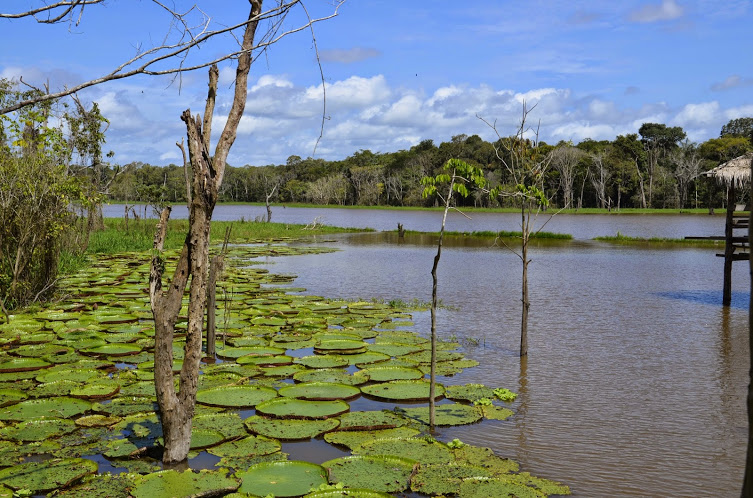
- Rio Negro lake in flood period

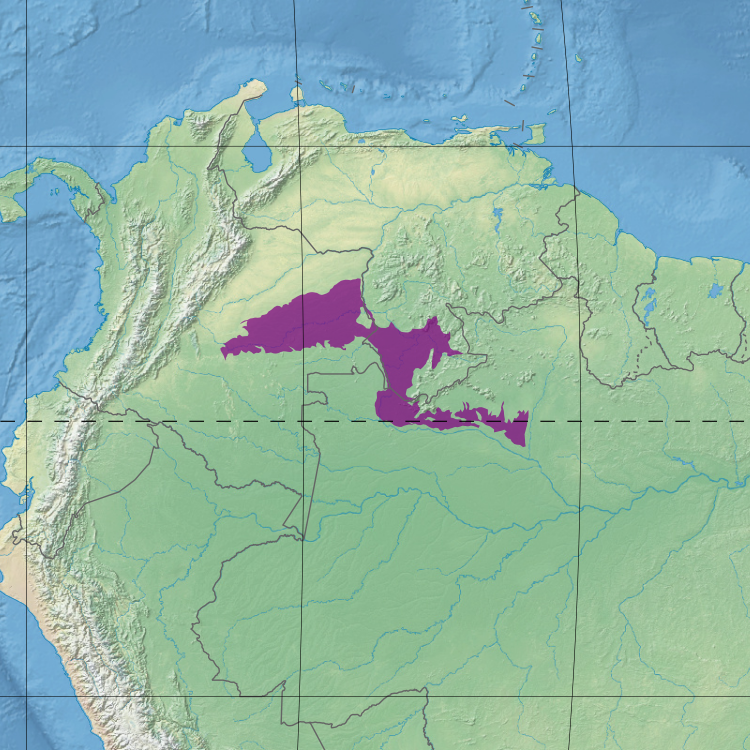
- Ecoregion territory (in purple)

Ecology
- Realm: Neotropical
- Biome: Tropical and subtropical moist broadleaf forests – Amazon
- Bird species: 486
- Mammal species: 194

Geography
- Area: 212,897 km^{2} (82,200 mi^{2})
- Countries: Brazil, Colombia, Venezuela
- Coordinates: 1.776°N 66.249°W
- Geology: Guiana Shield
- Rivers: Rio Negro, Rio Branco, Guaviare, Inírida, Vichada River, Ventuari

The Negro–Branco moist forests (NT0143) is an ecoregion of tropical moist broadleaf forest to the east of the Andes in southern Venezuela, eastern Colombia and northern Brazil, in the Amazon biome. It lies on the watershed between the Orinoco and Rio Negro basins. It includes both blackwater and whitewater rivers, creating different types of seasonally flooded forest. The vegetation is more typical of the Guiana region than the Amazon.

== Location ==
The ecoregion has an area of 21,289,702 hectares (52,608,000 acres) It overlays the Casiquiare Rift. The center of the ecoregion is in the extreme south of Venezuela, and covers part of the Parima Tapirapecó National Park. It extends west into Colombia, where it includes the south of El Tuparro National Natural Park, and extends to the southeast into the Brazilian states of Amazonas and Roraima, including part of the Pico da Neblina National Park. It adjoins the Caquetá and Japurá–Solimões–Negro moist forests to the south, the Llanos grasslands to the north, the Guianan piedmont and lowland moist forests to the east and the Uatuma–Trombetas moist forests to the southeast. It also adjoins or contains areas of Rio Negro campinarana.

== Hydrology ==
The Negro-Branco moist forests ecoregion is on the watershed between the Orinoco in Venezuela and the Rio Negro, which is known as the Guainía River in Colombia and is a major tributary of the Amazon River. Rivers include nutrient-poor clearwater and blackwater rivers, the latter type stained dark by tannin, and nutrient-rich whitewater rivers.

The blackwater Vichada River forms the northern border in Colombia, and the clearwater Ventuari River forms the northern border in Venezuela, both tributaries of the Orinoco. In Colombia the whitewater Guaviare and Inírida rivers are in the Orinoco Basin. The southern border in Colombia is defined by the middle Guaviare and by the upper reaches of the blackwater Guainía / Rio Negro to the Venezuela-Colombia border. In Venezuela the blackwater Casiquiare canal, a distributary of the Orinoco, feeds the Guainia/Negro River. The Rio Negro defines the southern border in Brazil to the whitewater Rio Branco.

== Environment ==
The ecoregion is on the ancient Guiana Shield, a craton formed in the Precambrian. Elevations range from 120 metres (390 ft) in the west to over 400 metres (1,300 ft) in the east in Venezuela. Terrain includes lowland plains, rolling hills and low sandstone plateaus. Until recently the lowland plains of the region were covered in lakes and seas, which deposited layers of sediment. Soil types are generally poor in nutrients, mainly podzols on the old alluvial terraces.

The ecoregion is part of the Río Negro-Juruá Moist Forests, a global ecoregion, the other parts being the Caquetá, Solimões–Japurá and Japurá–Solimoes–Negro moist forests. The reasonably intact global ecoregion has high annual rainfall, diverse soils and varied terrain, resulting in a high level of biodiversity. It has not been studied in great depth by scientists.

=== Flora ===
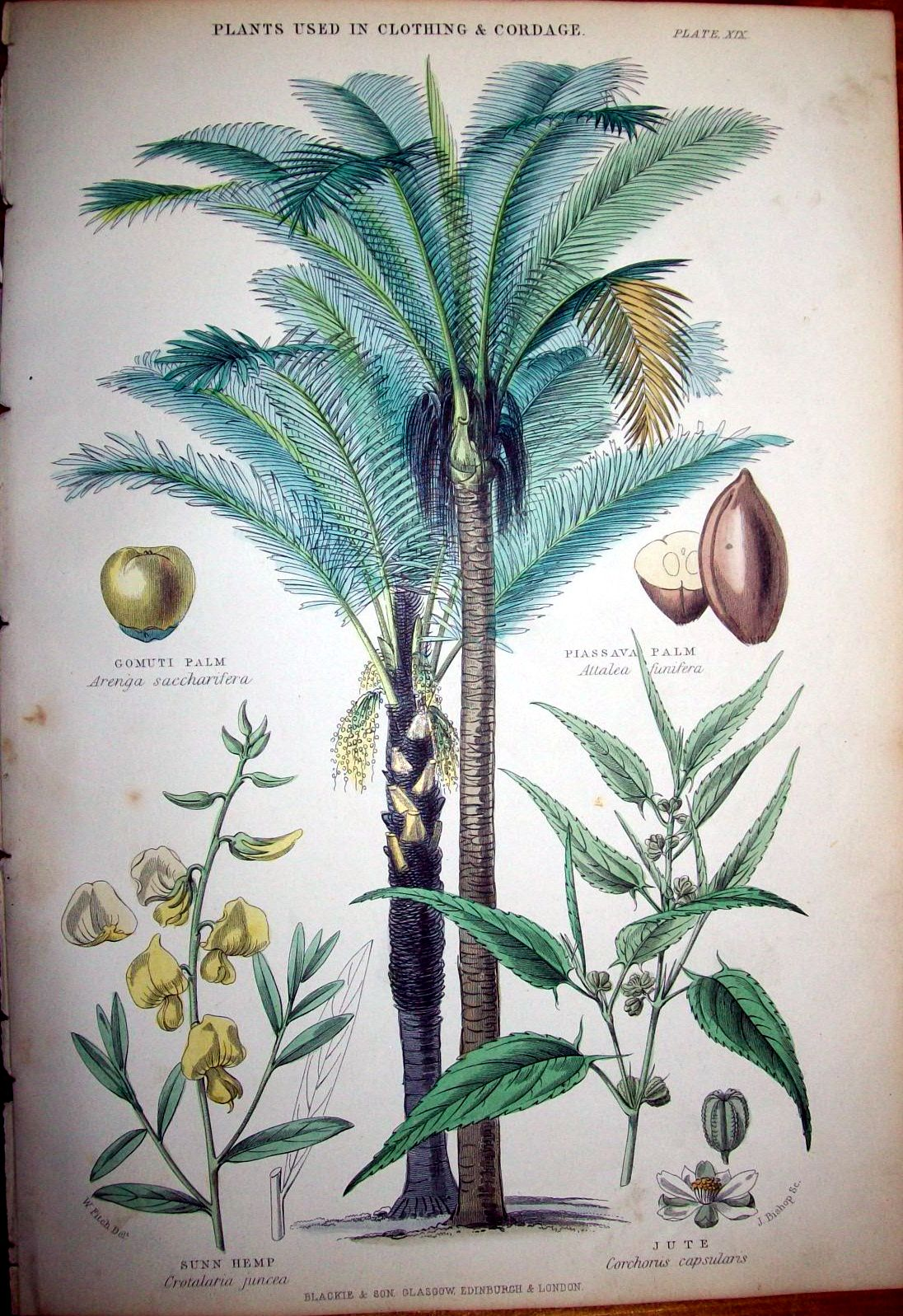
The endemic piassava palm. 1874 illustration by Walter Hood Fitch.

The Negro–Branco moist forests are in the tropical and subtropical moist broadleaf forests biome of the neotropical realm. Vegetation includes flooded and terra firme lowland moist forest, tall or medium-tall campinarana lowland forest, patches of shrubs and herbaceous savanna-like meadows. Forests are typical of the Guiana region, with a different mix of plants from the classical Amazon rainforest. Humiriaceae, Rapateaceae, Tepuianthaceae, Theaceae and Xyridaceae are common families that do not belong to the Amazon flora. The forests hold relatively few epiphytes or lianas compared to other parts of the western Amazon region.

The flat Casiquiare peneplain in Venezuela holds forests, savannas and other formations. It contains blackwater and whitewater rivers, which create igapó and várzea forest along their flooded banks. There are seasonally flooded and terra firme evergreen lowland forests reaching 40 metres (130 ft), and low evergreen flooded palm forests that reach 20 metres (66 ft). The dominant trees of the low palm forests are Mauritia flexuosa, Mauritiella aculeata, and dense groups of Euterpe catinga, Iriartea setigera, and Socratea exorrhiza.

The 40 metres (130 ft) terra firme forest holds Lecointea amazonica, Clathrotropis glaucophylla, Peltogyne venosa, and species in the Ocotea, Nectandra, Licania, Trichilia, Guarea, Toulicia, Erisma, and Ruizterania genera. The tall canopy forests also hold trees of the Oenocarpus, Socratea, Leopoldinia, and Bactris genera. There are patches of campinarana on white sands near the border of Venezuela and Colombia. There is a high level of endemism of flora including the genera Duckeanthus, Heteropetalum, Pseudephedranthus, Urospathella, Aquiaria, Angostylis, Astrococcus, and Chonocentrum. The economically valuable palm Leopoldinia piassaba is endemic to the ecoregion.

In the Rio Negro basin the many blackwater streams and small rivers flood a large area of igapó forest for 5–6 months each year. The canopy is up to 35 metres (115 ft) high. Common species are Virola theiodora, Eschweilera longipes, Eschweilera pachysepala, Aldina latifolia, and Pithecellobium amplissimum.

=== Fauna ===
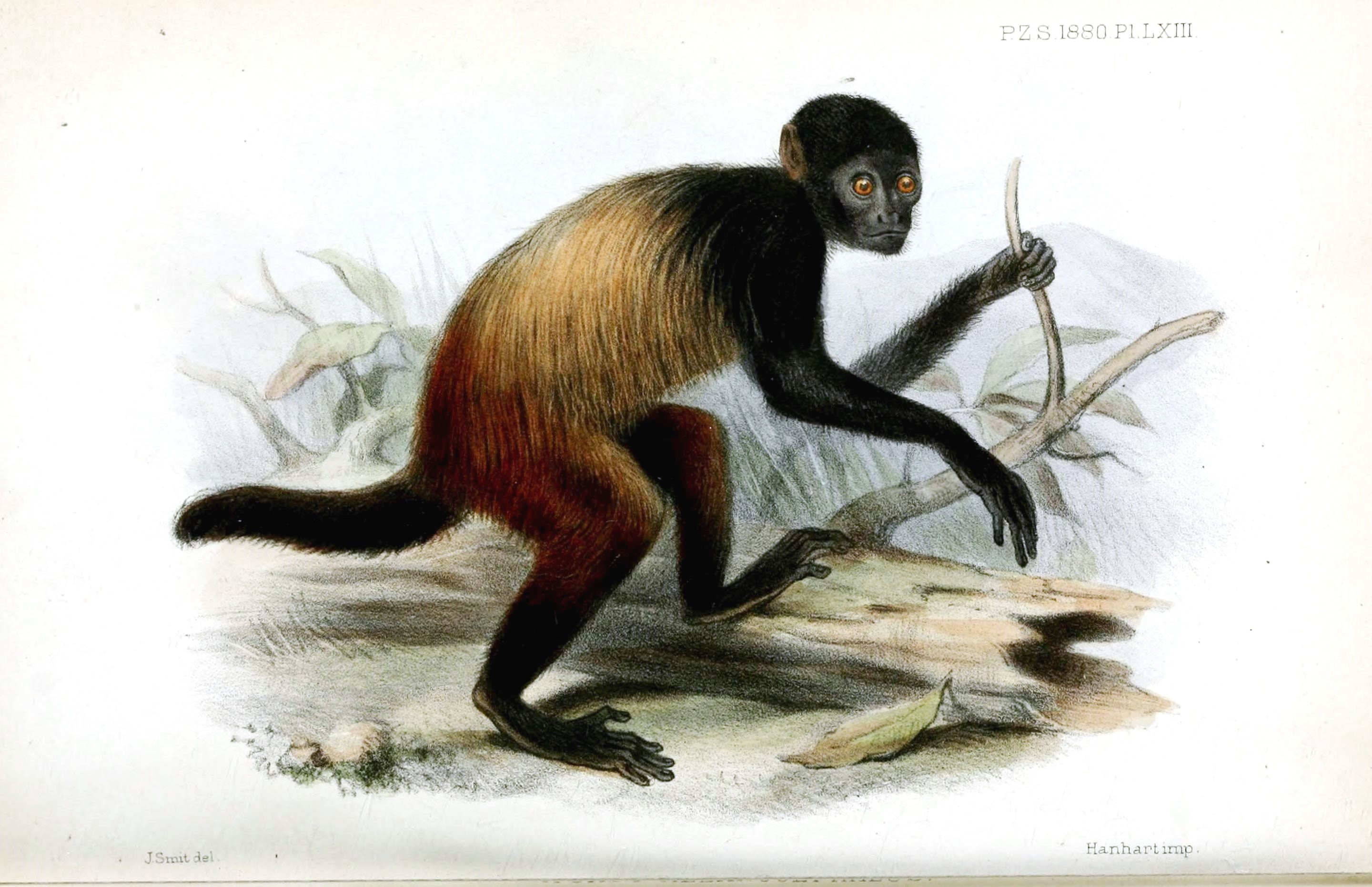
The golden-backed uakari (Cacajao melanocephalus) is endemic to the Negro-Branco moist forests.

There are 194 species of mammals, including a few endemic species such as golden-backed uakari (Cacajao melanocephalus), black bearded saki (Chiropotes satanas), Tschudi's slender opossum (Marmosops impavidus), least big-eared bat (Neonycteris pusilla), Guianan spear-nosed bat (Phyllostomus latifolius), Eldorado broad-nosed bat (Platyrrhinus aurarius), Venezuelan fish-eating rat (Neusticomys venezuelae), MacConnell's climbing mouse (Rhipidomys macconnelli), the guinea pig Cavia guianae and Simon's spiny rat (Proechimys simonsi). Common species include South American tapir (Tapirus terrestris), collared peccary (Pecari tajacu), pale-throated sloth (Bradypus tridactylus), long-tailed weasel (Mustela frenata), short-eared dog (Atelocynus microtis), bush dog (Speothos venaticus) and three species of small cats of the Leopardus genus.

There are many reptiles and amphibians. Snakes include fer-de-lance (Bothrops asper), palm pit-vipers (Bothriechis species), coral snakes (Micrurus genus), boa constrictors (Boa constrictor) and bushmasters (Lachesis muta). There are many green iguanas (Iguana iguana) and tegus lizards (Tupinambis genus). 486 species of birds have been recorded, a relatively low number for the Amazon region. They include the endemic grey-legged tinamou (Crypturellus duidae), crestless curassow (Mitu tomentosum), double-striped thick-knee (Burhinus bistriatus), oilbird (Steatornis caripensis), tawny-tufted toucanet (Selenidera nattereri), Orinoco piculet (Picumnus pumilus), Yapacana antbird (Myrmeciza disjuncta), gray-bellied antbird (Myrmeciza pelzelni), spot-tailed nightjar (Hydropsalis maculicaudus), azure-naped jay (Cyanocorax heilprini), and white-naped seedeater (Dolospingus fringilloides).

== Threats ==
The ecoregion covers most of the Alto Orinoco-Casiquiare Biosphere Reserve. A small part of the ecoregion is in the Pico da Neblina National Park. There are few threats to the ecoregion, which is inaccessible and has no roads. The forest is largely intact. People in riverine communities engage in small-scale rotation agriculture. There is some low-level logging and in some areas the understory is routinely burned by Brazil nut collectors. Leaves of the Leopoldinia piassaba palm are harvested to make brooms for sale internationally, and this may be unsustainable.
