= Alto Orinoco-Casiquiare Biosphere Reserve =

UNESCO biosphere reserve in Venezuela

Location of the Alto Orinoco-Casiquiare Biosphere Reserve
- Location within Venezuela
- Coordinates: 3.070°N 65.546°W
- Area: 8,266,230 ha (31,916.1 sq mi)
- Elevation: 100 to 3,000 metres (330 to 9,840 ft)
- Designated: 1993
- Administrator: Amazonas State Environmental Office

The Alto Orinoco-Casiquiare Biosphere Reserve is a UNESCO biosphere reserve in the Venezuelan Amazon biome.

== Location ==
The Alto Orinoco-Casiquiare Biosphere Reserve was designated in 1993. It is located between 00°30' to 04°40'N and 62°45' to 66°34'W in Venezuela, and has a total area of 8,266,230 hectares (20,426,300 acres). This makes it the largest UNESCO biosphere reserve in the tropics. It is administered by the Amazonas State Environmental Office of the Venezuelan Ministry of the Environment and Natural Resources. The Duida-Marahuaca National Park is in the northern part of the reserve. The reserve also contains the Serranía de la Neblina and Parima Tapirapecó national parks.

The lowest land is in the Casiquiare canal plateau and the highest is on the Cerro Marahuaca in the northeast. Altitudes range from 100 to 3,000 metres (330 to 9,840 ft) above sea level. The reserve is crossed from southeast to northwest by the upper Orinoco, which rises in the Parima Tapirapecó National Park and flows past the community of La Esmeralda in the center of the reserve.

== Environment ==
The Köppen climate classification is "Af": equatorial, fully humid. Most of the reserve is in the Negro-Branco moist forests ecoregion. It also contains areas of the Guayanan Highlands moist forests ecoregion.

The main ecosystem type is tropical humid forests. Habitats include lower montane rainforest with trees in the Clusia, Brocchinia, Ananas and Pitcairnia genera, semideciduous rainforest with trees such as Pourouma guianensis, Brownea ariza, Alexa superba, Cupania scrobiculata, Campinarana dominated by Eperua purpurea and holding Eperua falcata, Peltogyne caatingae and Aldinia discolor, lowland rainforest and palm forest with Oenocarpus bataua and Leopoldonia piassaba. Endangered mammals include Fernandez's sword-nosed bat (Lonchorhina fernandezi).

== Human factors ==
The biosphere reserve had about 150,000 inhabitants as of 1991, of which under 10% were indigenous people. The main aim of the biosphere reserve is to preserve the homelands and traditional lifestyles of the Yanomami (Note: The Yanomami also live in the adjoining Yanomami Indigenous Territory in Brazil.) and Ye'kuana peoples. They cultivate yuca, musaceas, túpiro (Solanum sessiliflorum), Pijiguao (Bactris gasipaes) and Ñame (Dioscorea genus).

Some local residents are opposed to protected areas and the ban on logging and mining. There is lack of culturally sensitive and effective programs for conservation and sustainable development. The region is threatened by illegal gold miners.

== Sources ==
- "Alto Orinoco-Casiquiare Biosphere Reserve", Global Species, Myers Enterprises II, archived from the original on 2017-03-22
- "Alto Orinoco-Casiquiare", MAB Biosphere Reserves Directory, UNESCO
- Guánchez, F.; Rodriguez, E. (December 1998), "The Yutajé Area in the Amazonas State of Venezuela", Emanations from the Rainforest, 1 (1), Cornell University, ISSN 1522-9858, archived from the original on February 19, 2001
- Sears, Robin, South America: Southern Venezuela, northern Brazil, western Guyana, and eastern Colombia (NT0124), WWF: World Wildlife Fund
- Sears, Robin; Marín, César, Northern South America: Eastern Colombia into Venezuela and Brazil, WWF: World Wildlife Fund
- The Yanomami, Survival
