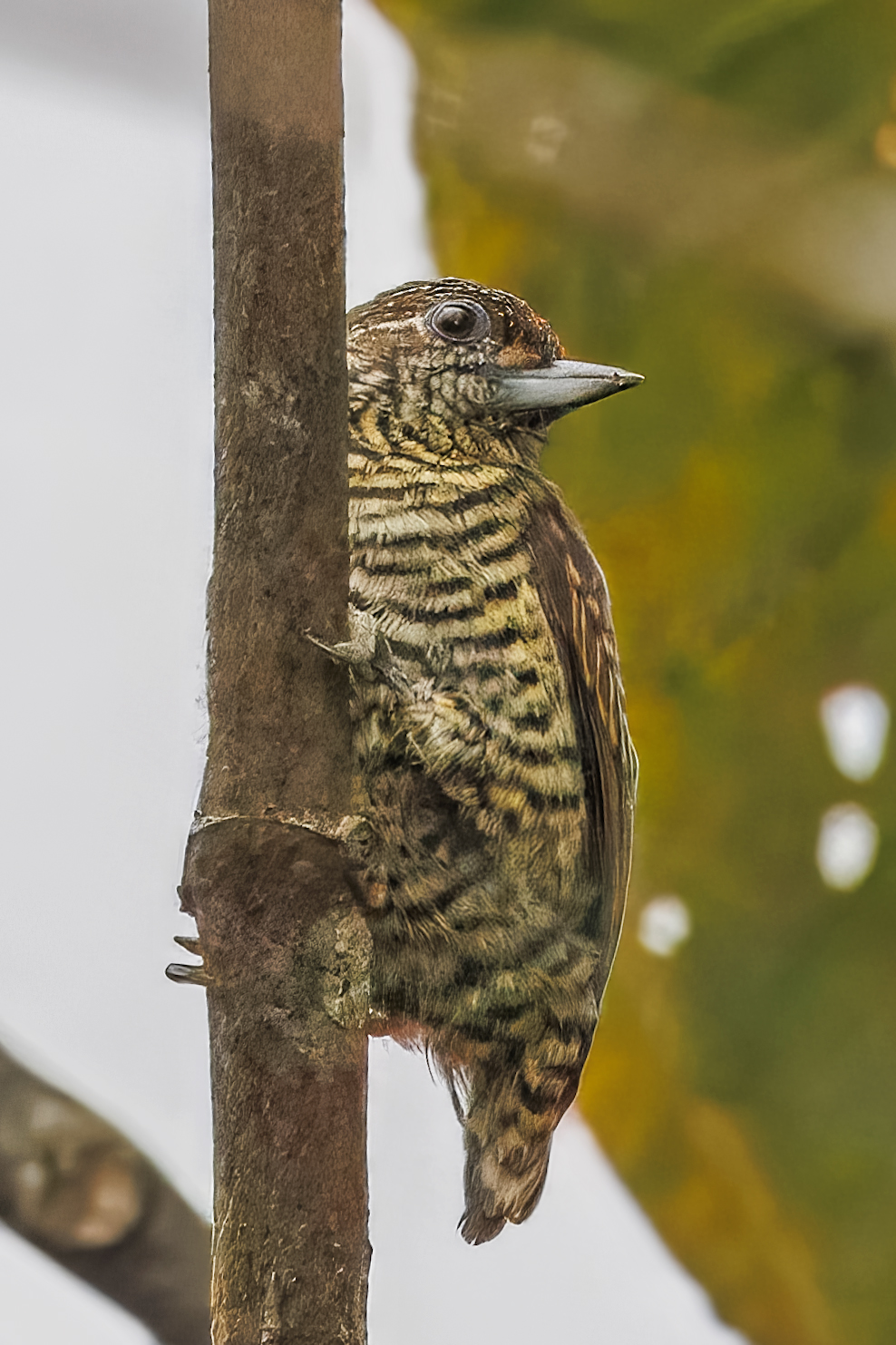
- Picumnus lafresnayi lafresneyi, Ecuador

Conservation status
- Least Concern (IUCN 3.1)

Scientific classification
- Kingdom: Animalia
- Phylum: Chordata
- Class: Aves
- Order: Piciformes
- Family: Picidae
- Genus: Picumnus
- Species: P. lafresnayi

Binomial name
- Picumnus lafresnayi Malherbe, 1862

= Lafresnaye's piculet =

Species of woodpecker

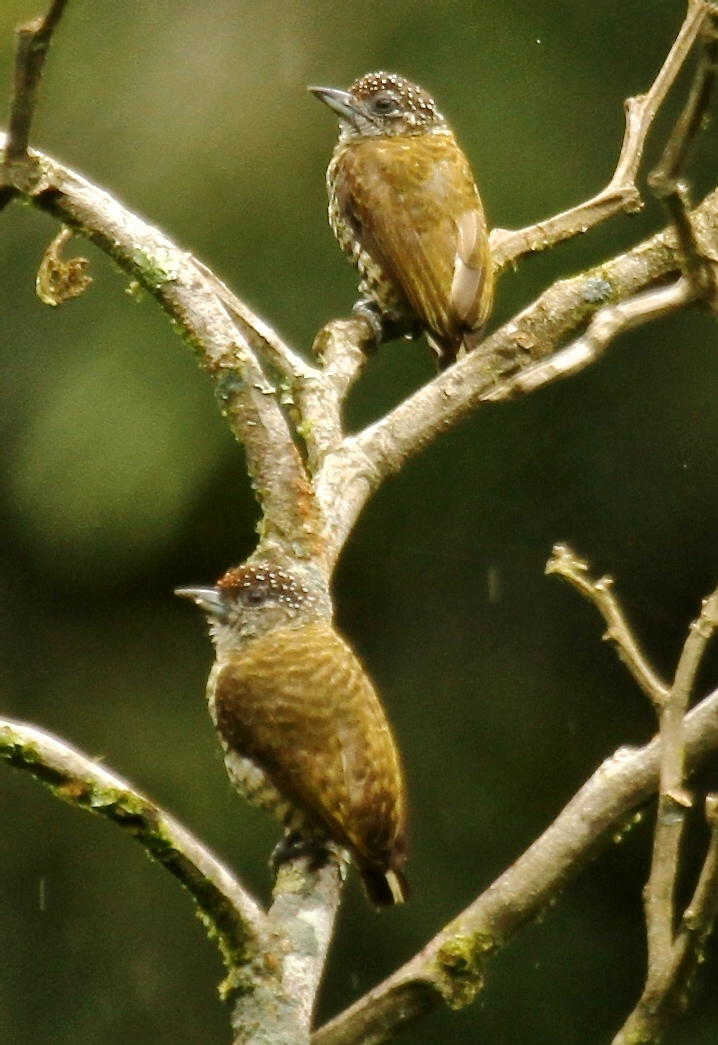

Lafresnaye's piculet (Picumnus lafresnayi) is a species of bird in subfamily Picumninae of the woodpecker family Picidae. It is found in Brazil, Colombia, Ecuador, and Peru.

== Taxonomy and systematics ==
Lafresnaye's piculet has these four subspecies:

- Picumnus lafresnayi lafresnayi Malherbe, 1862
- Picumnus lafresnayi punctifrons Taczanowski, 1886
- Picumnus lafresnayi taczanowskii Domaniewski, 1925
- Picumnus lafresnayi pusillus Pinto, 1936

What is now Lafresnaye's piculet was for a time treated as a subspecies of the bar-breasted piculet (P. aurifrons). Subspecies P. l. punctifrons was at one time treated as a separate species. What is now the Orinoco piculet (P. pumilus) was previously considered to be a subspecies of Lafresnaye's piculet, and they are now thought to form a superspecies.

== Description ==
Lafresnaye's piculet is 9 to 10 cm (3.5 to 3.9 in) long and weighs 9 to 10 g (0.32 to 0.35 oz). Adult males of the nominate subspecies P. l. lafresnayi have a dark olive-brown cap with red spots on the forehead and whitish ones on the rest of it and the nape. Their face is grayish buff with brown streaks or spots and a pale stripe behind the eye. Their upperparts are dark green or brownish green with yellowish green bars. The upper side of their tail is blackish; the innermost pair of feathers have mostly white inner webs and the outer three pairs have a large white area near the tip. Their chin and throat are buffish white with narrow black marks. Their underparts are pale yellowish white with wide black bars. Adult females are identical but for whitish spots on their entire crown. Juveniles are similar to adults but duller overall, greener above, and less evenly barred below.

The other three subspecies of Lafresnaye's piculet have yellow-orange spots on the forehead instead of the nominate's red ones. In addition, P. l. punctifrons has a darker face and narrower bars on its underparts than the nominate. P. l. taczanowskii has a blacker crown and wider, more irregular, dark barring on its underparts. P. l. pusillus has a slight rufous tinge to its upperparts, narrow dark bars on its underparts, and a mostly unbarred center of the belly.

== Distribution and habitat ==
The subspecies of Lafresnaye's piculet are found thus:

- Picumnus lafresnayi lafresnayi, from southeastern Colombia south through eastern Ecuador to Peru's Department of San Martín
- Picumnus lafresnayi punctifrons, northern Peru's Amazonas Department
- Picumnus lafresnayi taczanowskii, northeastern and north-central Peru between the departments of Huánuco and Ayacucho
- Picumnus lafresnayi pusillus, north-central Brazil along the middle Amazon east to the Rio Negro

Lafresnaye's piculet inhabits the edges and clearings of humid mature forest and also secondary forest. In elevation it mostly is found up to 1,400 m (4,600 ft) but occurs occasionally as high as 1,800 m (5,900 ft) in Ecuador.

== Behavior ==
=== Movement ===
As far as is known, Lafresnaye's piculet is a year-round resident throughout its range.

=== Feeding ===
Lafresnaye's piculet gleans prey in the lower and middle strata of the forest. It is known to favor termites and is assumed to also feed on other small invertebrates. It often joins mixed-species foraging flocks.

=== Breeding ===
Lafresnaye's piculet apparently breeds between July and November. Few nests are known; one was in a hole about 3 m (10 ft) above the ground in a shrub and had two eggs. Both sexes care for hatchlings. The incubation period and time to fledging are not known.

=== Vocalization ===
Lafresnaye's piculet is not highly vocal, but does occasionally make a "high-pitched 'tseeyt, tsit'." The call has also been described as an "extr. high 'see-see'."

== Status ==
The IUCN has assessed Lafresnaye's piculet as being of Least Concern. It has a large range but its population size is not known and is believed to be decreasing. No immediate threats have been identified. It is considered "[u]ncommon to fairly common" in Ecuador and rare in Peru.
