= Guianan piedmont and lowland moist forests =

Guianan Forests, Venezuela/Brazil

Guianan piedmont and lowland moist forests (NT0182)
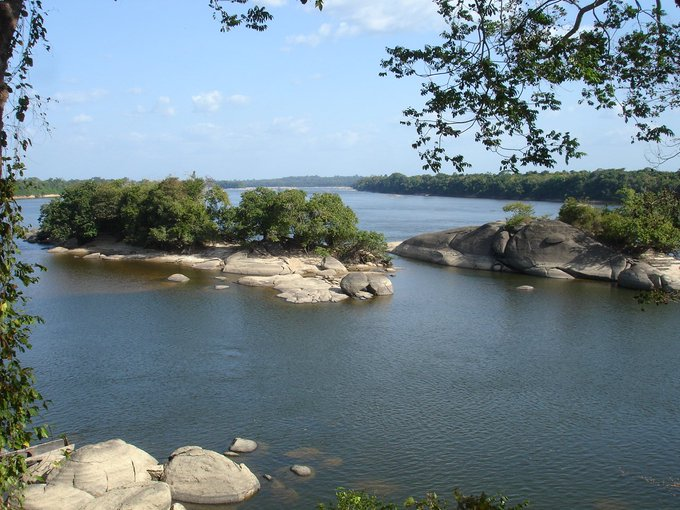
- Caura National Park, Venezuela

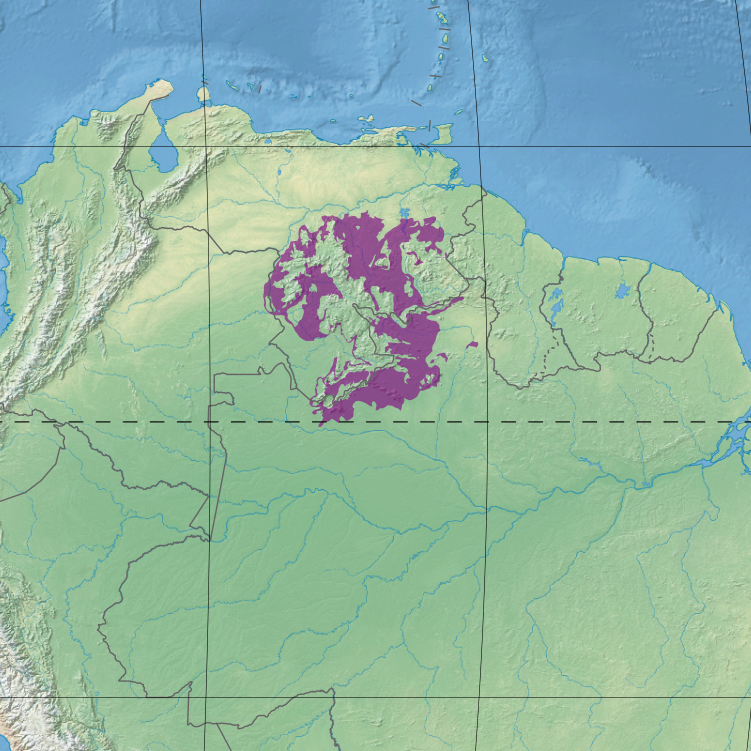
- Ecoregion territory (in purple)

Ecology
- Realm: Neotropical
- Biome: Tropical and subtropical moist broadleaf forests

Geography
- Area: 231,384 km^{2} (89,338 mi^{2})
- Countries: Venezuela, Brazil
- Coordinates: 3.114°N 62.332°W
- Climate type: Af: equatorial, fully humid

The Guianan piedmont and lowland moist forests (NT0182) is an ecoregion in the south of Venezuela and the north of Brazil. It is in the Amazon biome. The ecoregion is relatively intact, largely protected by conservation units or indigenous territories, and less threatened by global warming than flatter and more deforested regions.

== Location ==
The Guianan piedmont and lowland moist forests ecoregion is in the south of Venezuela and the north of the Brazilian states of Amazonas and Roraima. It surrounds sections of the Guayanan Highlands moist forests, which in turn surround areas of tepui. It includes or adjoins patches of Rio Negro campinarana. To the north the ecoregion adjoins the Llanos, and to the east it adjoins the Guianan moist forests and the Guianan savanna. To the southeast it adjoins the Uatuma–Trombetas moist forests, and to the south and southwest it adjoins the Negro–Branco moist forests.

== Ecology ==
The Guianan piedmont and lowland moist forests ecoregion is in the Neotropical realm and the tropical and subtropical moist broadleaf forests biome.

=== Climate ===
The Köppen climate classification is "Af": equatorial, fully humid. Temperatures are relatively steady throughout the year, slightly cooler in July–September and slightly warmer in April–May. Yearly average temperatures range from a minimum of 18 °C (64 °F) to a maximum of 29 °C (84 °F), with a mean of 23.5 °C (74.3 °F). Average annual rainfall is about 3,600 millimetres (140 in). Monthly rainfall varies from 71.8 millimetres (2.83 in) in January to 532.3 millimetres (20.96 in) in July.

=== Flora ===
As of 2005 the Brazilian portion of the ecoregion preserved 73.4% of its original vegetation. The tree Albizia glabripetala, a riverside species 10 to 12 metres (33 to 39 ft) high, is found in the ecoregion. The liana Machaerium madeirense, found at elevations of between 100 and 500 metres (330 and 1,640 ft), grows in the forests.

=== Fauna ===
Endangered mammals include black bearded saki (Chiropotes satanas), Fernandez's sword-nosed bat (Lonchorhina fernandezi) and giant otter (Pteronura brasiliensis). The white-tailed deer (Odocoileus virginianus) is invasive.

== Status ==
As of 2012 the ecoregion had not been heavily exploited by humans, and various approaches to conservation were being followed. As of 2009 180,721.1 hectares (446,572 acres), or 78.1%, was protected to some extent. A 2014 WWF report stated that protected areas covered 26% and indigenous territories covered 47%, for a total of 73%. The same report said 0.38% of the ecosystem, or 88,025 hectares (217,510 acres), had been deforested. Protected areas include the El Caura Forest Reserve, Estación Biológica El Frío, Imataca Forest Reserve, Maracá Ecological Reserve and Canaima National Park.

Global warming will force tropical species to migrate uphill to find areas with suitable temperature and rainfall. The Guianan piedmont and lowland moist forests ecoregion is among the least vulnerable in the Amazon region in this respect, while low, flat and deforested ecoregions such as the Tocantins–Araguaia–Maranhão moist forests are extremely vulnerable. For the purpose of conserving threatened neotropical mammals the ecoregion is considered to be at medium risk.

== Sources ==
- "Albizia glabripetala", IUCN Red List, IUCN
- Brazil's Ecoregions - Terrestrial and Marine Priorities (PDF), LIFE Institute, 2015
- Coad, L.; Burgess, N.D.; Loucks, C.; Fish, L.; Scharlemann, J.P.W.; Duarte, L; Besançon, B. (July 2009), The ecological representativeness of the global protected areas estate in 2009: progress towards the CBD 2010 target (PDF), UNEP-WCMC: United Nations Environment Programme World Conservation Monitoring Centre
- Cunha, Fabiana Madeira Assunção; Loyola, Rafael Dias (July–December 2011), "Prioridades espaciais para a conservação de mamíferos ameaçados de extinção na região Neotropical", Bioikos (in Portuguese), 25 (2), Campinas
- Feeley, Kenneth J.; Rehm, Evan (2013), Amazon's vulnerability to climate change heightened by deforestation and man-made dispersal barriers (PDF), Miami, FL: Florida International University, archived from the original (PDF) on 2017-04-04
- "Guianan piedmont and lowland moist forests", Global Species, Myers Enterprises II
- "Machaerium madeirense", IUCN Red List, IUCN
- Maretti, C.C.; Riveros, S., J.C.; Hofstede, R.; Oliveira, D.; Charity, S.; Granizo, T.; Alvarez, C; Valdujo, P.; Thompson, C. (2014), State of the Amazon: Ecological Representation in Protected Areas and Indigenous Territories (PDF), Brasília and Quito: WWF Living Amazon (Global) Initiative
- WildFinder, WWF: World Wildlife Fund
