= Campinarana =

Ecoregion in Brazil, Colombia, and Venezuela

Rio Negro campinarana
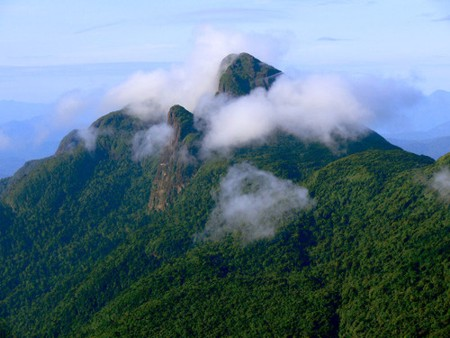
- Serra da Mocidade National Park, Brazil

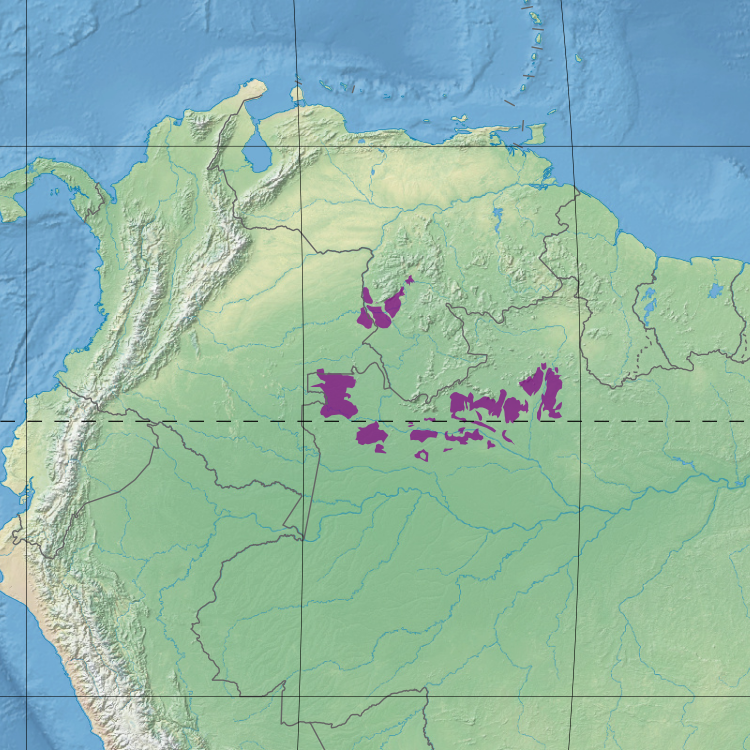
- Ecoregion territory (in purple)

Ecology
- Realm: Neotropical
- Biome: Tropical and subtropical moist broadleaf forests – Amazon
- Bird species: 368
- Mammal species: 153

Geography
- Area: 80,800 km^{2} (31,200 sq mi)
- Countries: Colombia; Brazil; Venezuela
- Coordinates: 0.512°N 63.331°W
- Geology: Amazon Basin
- Rivers: Amazon River; Rio Negro, Rio Branco

Campinarana (Note: The term "campina" is sometimes used instead of "campinarana". The meaning of both terms is "wild field". Other terms for Campinarana are called "heath forest" or "Rio Negro caatinga".) (NT0158, Portuguese pronunciation: [kɐ̃ˌpinɐˈɾɐ̃nɐ]), also called Rio Negro Campinarana, is a neotropical ecoregion in the Amazon biome of the north west of Brazil, southern Venezuela, and the east of Colombia that contains vegetation adapted to extremely poor soil. It includes savanna, scrub and forest, and contains many endemic species of fauna and flora.

== Location ==
Areas of campinarana, which may cover several thousand square kilometres, are found in the transitional region from the Guyana Shield to the Amazon basin. Large stretches of Campinarana are contained within the Japurá-Solimões-Negro moist forests, Negro-Branco moist forests, Guianan piedmont and lowland moist forests, Uatuma-Trombetas moist forests and Guianan savanna. The campinarana ecoregion totals about 31,200 square miles (81,000 km^{2}).

Campinarana is mainly found in flat flooded areas in the Rio Negro and Rio Branco basins, which are tributaries of the Amazon, in northern Brazil along the borders of Colombia and Venezuela, and in the Ventuari–upper Orinoco basin in Venezuela's southernmost state of Amazonas.

Smaller patches are found throughout the Amazon region. Areas of white-sand soils and their characteristic campinarana vegetation are found in the Serra do Cachimbo on the Pará–Mato Grosso boundary, the Parecis plateau in Rondônia, the Atlantic coast near the mouth of the Amazon, and in Maranhão. Similar vegetation is found in northern Peru, eastern Colombia and south western Venezuela.

== Climate ==
Temperatures in the region average 24 °C (75 °F) and average rainfall is 2,500 to 3,000 millimetres (98 to 118 in).

== Soil characteristics ==
Tropical soils are generally infertile, and white sand soils are among the most infertile of such soils, primarily composed of quartz sand. The white sands are found on arenaceous sediments on the low terra firme uplands, on natural levees in a flooded Várzea forest, on restinga sand dunes in a coastal lowland, on Cretaceous sandstone plateaus and on hill areas of granitic rocks. The soil type determines the ecosystem more than temperature or rainfall. Factors affecting the vegetation are poor drainage, extremely sandy soil, intense leaching and impermeable layers below the surface. Campinarana is typically found on leached white sands around circular swampy depressions in lowland tropical moist forest. The soil is low in nutrients, with highly acidic humus.

A study at San Carlos de Río Negro, near the confluence of the Guainia and Casiquiare rivers in southern Venezuela, found the soils were similar to temperate podzols. They had a thick humus layer, a highly leached A horizon, and a well developed Bh horizon at 1 metre (3 ft 3 in). Tropical rainfall over millions of years had intensely leached the soils, which had become infertile due to lack of a source of fresh parent material. They may be short of phosphorus and/or calcium. The water that drains the Campinarana is tea colored, often called blackwater. The low exchange capacity of the podzols lets decomposing organic matter dissolve in soil water as humic acids, from where it is carried into the nearby streams.

== Ecology ==
=== Flora ===
Campinarana has very varied vegetation formations from fields to forests with thin trees. The sclerophyllous vegetation is adapted to the sandy soil, with high endemism and low diversity. Campinarana vegetation includes savanna, scrub and forests. The Brazilian Institute of Geography and Statistics defines four subtypes, or formations, of vegetation:

Formation	Other names
Forest	Caatinga da Amazônia and Caatinga-Gapó
Woodland	Campinarana and Caatinga-Gapó
Shrub	Campina da Amazônia and Caatinga-Gapó
Grass-woody	Campina da Amazônia

The forests are found higher up. They have trees up to 30 metres (98 ft) from families that differ from those in the humid rain forest that surrounds the Campinarana. The scrub has bare sand, herbaceous plants, shrubs and trees less than 7 metres (23 ft) high. The palm Barcella odora is endemic. It is found on the sides of the depressions. The savannah is mainly composed of grasses and lichens, found in the wet plains beside lakes and rivers.

=== Fauna ===
Fauna are less diverse in the campinarana than in the surrounding ecoregions. 153 species of mammals have been reported. Mammals with restricted distribution include white-faced saki (Pithecia pithecia), golden-backed uakari (Cacajao melanocephalus), red-faced spider monkey (Ateles paniscus), mottle-faced tamarin (Saguinus inustus), Isabelle's ghost bat (Diclidurus isabella), Marinkelle's sword-nosed bat (Lonchorhina marinkellei), least big-eared bat (Neonycteris pusilla), Ega long-tongued bat (Scleronycteris ega), Brock's yellow-eared bat (Vampyriscus brocki), yellow-throated squirrel (Sciurus gilvigularis), northern grass mouse (Necromys urichi), black-tailed hairy dwarf porcupine (Coendou melanurus) and Tome's spiny rat (Proechimys semispinosus). Other mammals include collared peccary (Pecari tajacu), white-lipped peccary (Tayassu pecari), South American tapir (Tapirus terrestris), jaguar (Panthera onca) and red brocket (Mazama americana). Endangered mammals include white-bellied spider monkey (Ateles belzebuth), black bearded saki (Chiropotes satanas), Fernandez's sword-nosed bat (Lonchorhina fernandezi), Marinkelle's sword-nosed bat (Lonchorhina marinkellei) and giant otter (Pteronura brasiliensis).

368 species of birds have been recorded, fewer than in the surrounding forest. Endemic species include Rio Branco antbird (Cercomacra carbonaria), spot-backed antwren (Herpsilochmus dorsimaculatus), chestnut-crested antbird (Rhegmatorhina cristata) and Orinoco piculet (Picumnus pumilus). Species with restricted distribution include russet-backed oropendola (Psarocolius angustifrons), white-bellied dacnis (Dacnis albiventris), dotted tanager (Tangara varia), Serra do Mar tyrant-manakin (Neopelma chrysolophum), yellow-crested manakin (Heterocercus flavivertex) and crestless curassow (Mitu tomentosum). Endangered birds include Rio Branco antbird (Cercomacra carbonaria) and yellow-bellied seedeater (Sporophila nigricollis).

== Status ==
The World Wildlife Fund classes the ecoregion as "Relatively Stable/Intact". None of the ecoregion is protected, but most of it is relatively intact due to its low productivity. Some areas have suffered from cattle grazing, with burning to maintain pasturage.
