= Uatuma–Trombetas moist forests =

Ecoregion in Brazil

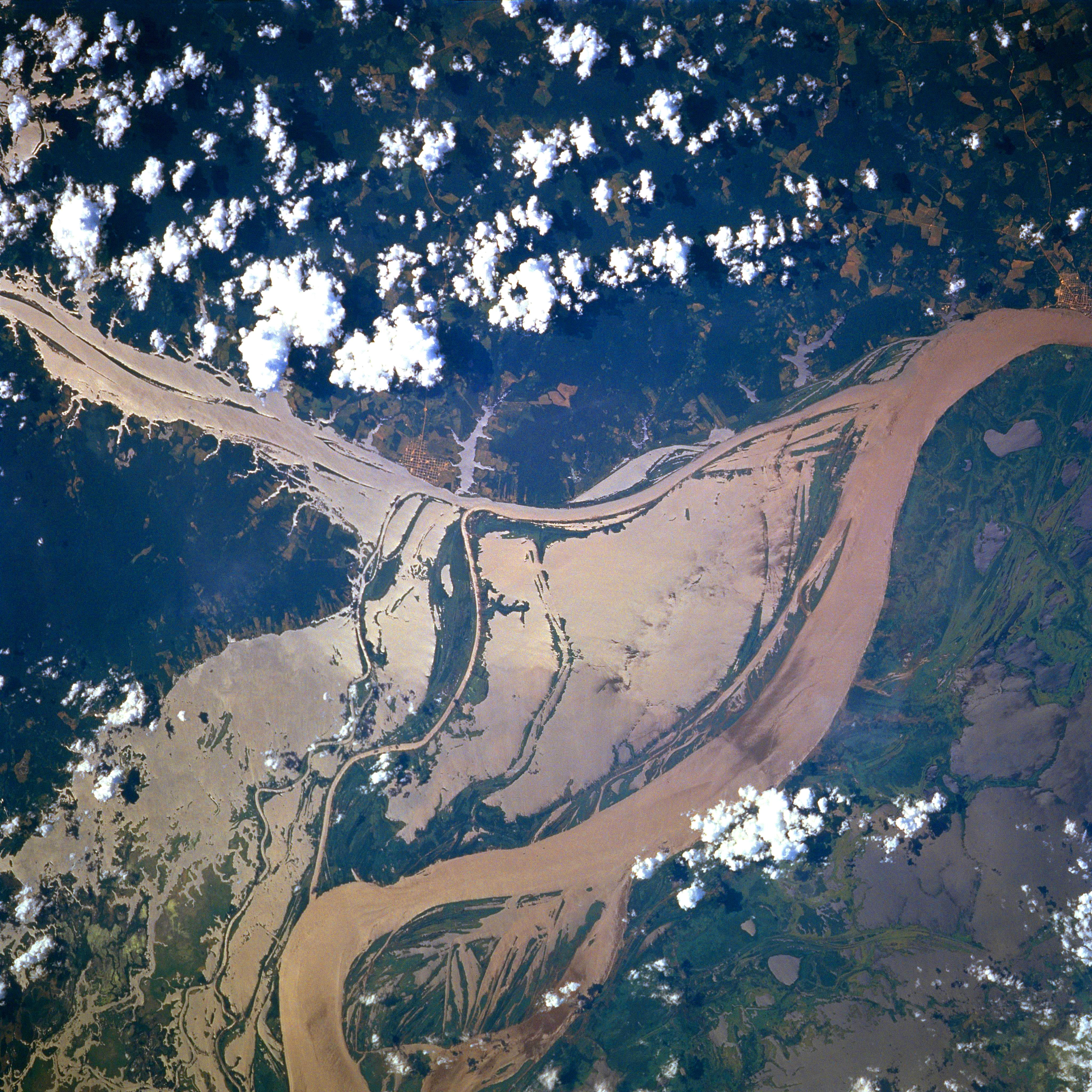
- Section of the Amazon River midway between Manaus and the coast. The Trombetas River flows from the northwest (upper right) into the Amazon.

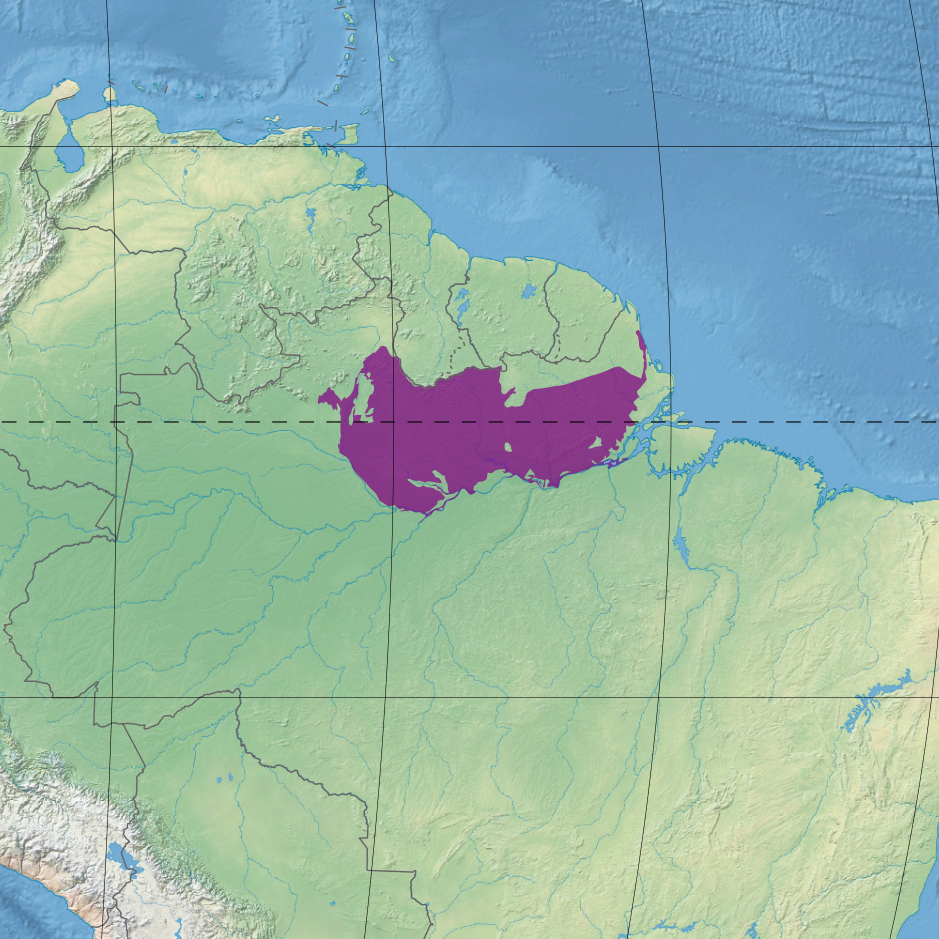
- Ecoregion territory (in purple)

Ecology
- Realm: Neotropical
- Biome: tropical and subtropical moist broadleaf forests

Geography
- Area: 473,190 km^{2} (182,700 sq mi)
- Country: Brazil
- Coordinates: 0.087°S 55.805°W

The Uatuma–Trombetas moist forests (NT0173) is an ecoregion in northwest Brazil in the Amazon biome. It covers the Amazon basin north of the Amazon River from close to the Atlantic Ocean to the Rio Negro west of Manaus. The ecoregion is relatively intact, although it has been damaged along the main rivers and around population centers.

== Location ==
The Uatuma–Trombetas moist forests ecoregion is in the north of Brazil in parts of the states of Roraima, Amazonas and Amapá to the north of the Amazon River. Small areas of the ecoregion cross the Brazilian border into Guyana and Suriname. It has an area of 47,319,082 hectares (116,928,000 acres). The ecoregion covers the area to the north of the Amazon River from close to the Atlantic coast to the Rio Negro and the Branco River. In the north to extends to the mountains along the border between Brazil and the Guianas and Suriname. On the 1993 Brazilian Institute of Geography and Statistics map the Brazilian part is shown as "lowland ombrophilous dense forests", "submontane ombrophilous dense forests" and "ombrophilous forest – savanna transition".

The Uatuma–Trombetas moist forests ecoregion is bounded to the south by the Monte Alegre várzea, Gurupa várzea and Marajó várzea ecoregions along the Amazon River. It adjoins sections of the Guianan savanna ecoregion to the east and north, but most of the northern border adjoins the Guianan moist forests ecoregion. In the northwest it adjoins a section of the Guayanan Highlands moist forests ecoregion. The western part of the Uatuma-Trombetas ecoregion contains large areas of Rio Negro campinarana. To the west it adjoins Guianan piedmont and lowland moist forests, Negro–Branco moist forests and Japurá–Solimões–Negro moist forests.

== Physical ==
The north of the ecoregion reaches into the quartzite or sandstone upland terraces and mountains of the ancient Guiana Shield, while the south is in the much newer sedimentary basin of the Amazon River, formed during the recent Tertiary period. It contains high plains, rolling hills and lowlands, with diverse fauna and flora in the different habitats. Soils are mostly kaolinite, or sandy podzols on the slopes, and are low in nutrients, but some areas have very fertile clay loam soils. The ecoregion is crossed by various blackwater or clearwater rivers, including the Trombetas, Jari, Uatumã, Curuapanema, Paru and Araguari.

== Climate ==
The Köppen climate classification is "Am": equatorial, monsoonal. Mean monthly temperatures are 26 to 27 °C (79 to 81 °F). Rainfall is seasonal. Average annual rainfall ranges from 1,700 millimetres (67 in) in the east to 3,000 millimetres (120 in) in the west.

== Ecology ==
The Uatuma–Trombetas moist forests ecoregion is in the Neotropical realm and the tropical and subtropical moist broadleaf forests biome.

=== Flora ===
The ecoregion contains lowland flooded forests along tributaries of the Amazon, and seasonally dry forests and meadows on the Guiana Shield. The larger part of the ecoregion is covered by humid rainforest with a canopy 30 to 40 metres (98 to 131 ft) high and emergent trees reaching 50 metres (160 ft). There are areas of seasonal forest east of Óbidos that is dry in the summer and has a canopy under 20 metres (66 ft), with mesophyllous, semideciduous and xeromorphic flora. There are also some open meadows.

In the west, Manaus may be a region where organisms that had separated and evolved independently during ice ages came back together in warmer periods. The forests to the north and east of Manaus are among the most diverse in the world, and include many endemic plants, animals and insects. To the north of Manaus there are as many as 235 species of trees in one hectare. Common tree species include Protium hebetatum, Eschweilera coriacea, Eschweilera wachenheimii, Manilkara bidentata, Rinorea guianensis, Pouteria engleri, Swartzia reticulata, Duckeodendron cestroides, and Qualea labouriauara. To the west of the Trombetas the forest typically has a canopy from 20 to 30 metres (66 to 98 ft) with emergent trees reaching 40 metres (130 ft). The dense vegetation has many small-to-medium diameter trees, under 600 millimetres (24 in) wide. The most common families of trees are Sapotaceae, Lecythidaceae, Burseraceae, Fabaceae, Rubiaceae, Chrysobalanaceae, Lauraceae, Annonaceae, Moraceae, Mimosoideae and Caesalpinioideae.

The forests are more homogeneous in structure east of the Trombetas River, have but similar height and species. The Brazil nut (Bertholletia excelsa) and Dinizia excelsa are common, but do not reach the same size as elsewhere. The forests do not have large numbers of epiphytes. The acapú (Vouacapoua americana) is an important timber tree that is endemic to the east of the ecoregion. The dry hills to the north of Óbidos hold plants such as Zamia lecointei, Cynometra longifolia, Tachigalia grandiflora, Swartzia duckei, Ormosia cuneata, Peltogyne paradoxa, Cusparia trombetensis, Vochysia mapuerae, Bonnetia dinizii, Lacunaria sampaioi, Lophostoma dinizii, Ctenardisia speciosa, Mostuea brasiliensis, Macairea viscosa, Buchenavia corrugata, Ferdinandusa cordata, Pouteria speciosa and Lepidocordia punctata.

=== Fauna ===
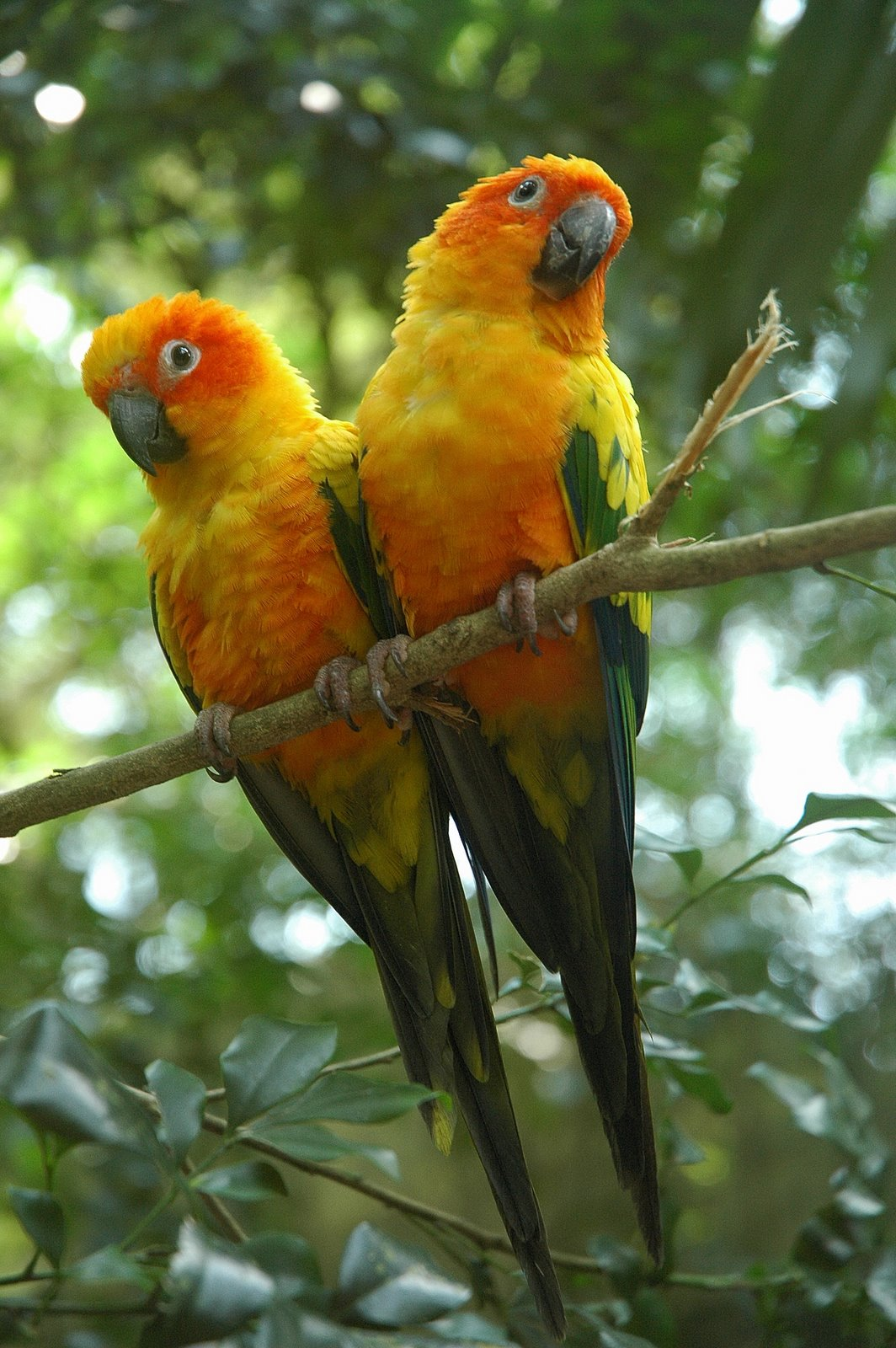
Two captive sun parakeets (Aratinga solstitialis)

175 species of mammals have been reported of which over 80 are bats. Primates include red-faced spider monkey (Ateles paniscus), pied tamarin (Saguinus bicolor), black bearded saki (Chiropotes satanas), Venezuelan red howler (Alouatta seniculus) and red-handed tamarin (Saguinus midas). Other mammals include jaguar (Panthera onca), cougar (Puma concolor), anteaters, opossums and many rodents. Endangered mammals include the black bearded saki (Chiropotes satanas), pied tamarin (Saguinus bicolor) and giant otter (Pteronura brasiliensis).

42 frog species have been recorded around Manaus including the Surinam horned frog (Ceratophrys cornuta) and tree frogs (genus Hyla). 62 snake species have been recorded including the common lancehead (Bothrops atrox), bushmaster (Lachesis muta) and boa constrictor (Boa constrictor). 23 species of lizards include the green iguana (Iguana iguana) and many geckos.

482 species of birds have been reported including tinamous (genus Crypturellus), parrots (genus Amazona), macaws (genus Ara), cookoos (genus Coccyzus), potoos (family Nyctibiidae) and tanagers (genus Tachyphonus). Endangered birds include the sun parakeet (Aratinga solstitialis).

== Status ==
The World Wildlife Fund classes the ecoregion as "Relatively Stable/Intact". The habitat is fairly intact in the interior, but continues to suffer from deforestation along the main roads and rivers, around and to the north of Manaus, and in the region from Óbidos to Monte Alegre along the Amazon. Cattle ranchers have cleared large areas of forest, as have commercial plantations around the Jari River and forestry in the east of the region. Some species are threatened by the trade in wildlife, by hunting and by selective logging. Upland areas have been destroyed by mining, which has polluted the rivers. Huge areas of upland forest were submerged by the Balbina Dam in the southwest.

The 3,850 square kilometres (1,490 sq mi) Rio Trombetas Biological Reserve and the 2,271 square kilometres (877 sq mi) Jari Ecological Station protect parts of the ecoregion.

== Sources ==
- Sears, Robin, Northern South America: Northeastern Brazil, into southern Guyana and Suriname (NT0173), WWF: World Wildlife Fund
- "Uatuma-Trombetas moist forests", Global Species, Myers Enterprises II
- WildFinder, WWF: World Wildlife Fund
