= Amazon biome =

Ecological region of South America

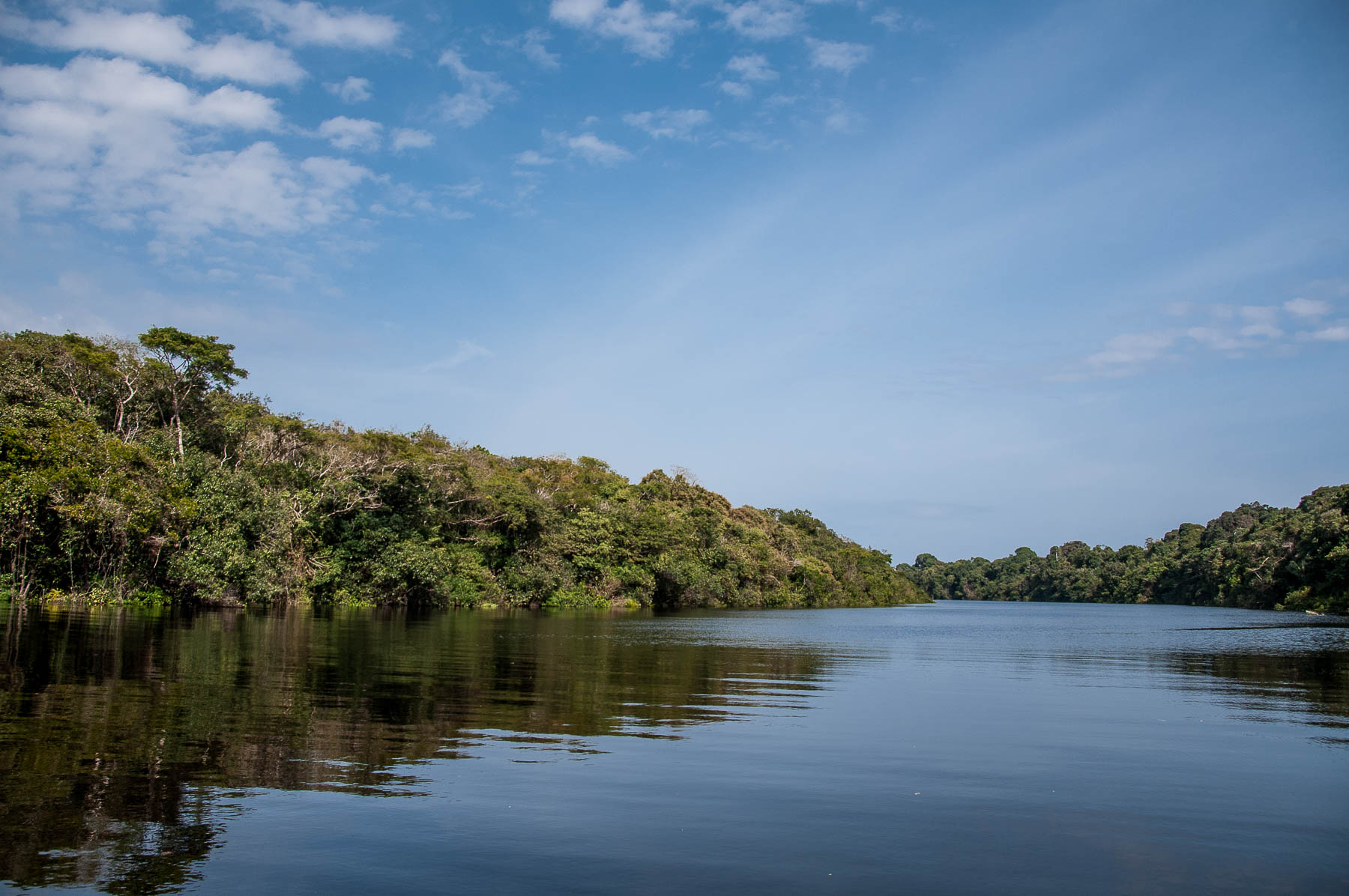
- Anavilhanas National Park, Amazonas, Brazil

- Amazon biome (white outline) and Amazon basin (light blue outline)

Ecology
- Biome: Amazonia

Geography
- Area: 6,700,000 km^{2} (2,600,000 mi^{2})
- Countries: List: Brazil; Bolivia; Peru; Venezuela; Ecuador; Colombia; Guyana; Suriname; France (region of French Guiana)
- Coordinates: 2°58′S 64°36′W

The Amazon biome (Portuguese: Bioma Amazônia) contains the Amazon rainforest, an area of tropical rainforest, and other ecoregions that cover most of the Amazon basin and some adjacent areas to the north and east. The biome contains blackwater and whitewater flooded forest, lowland and montane terra firma forest, bamboo and palm forest, savanna, sandy heath and alpine tundra. Some areas of the biome are threatened by deforestation for timber and to make way for pasture or soybean plantations.

== Location ==
The Amazon biome has an area of 6,700,000 square kilometres (2,600,000 sq mi). (Note: Another source gives the area of the Great Amazon as about 7,800,000 square kilometres (3,000,000 sq mi).) The biome roughly corresponds to the Amazon basin, but excludes areas of the Andes to the west and cerrado (savannah) to the south, and includes lands to the northeast extending to the Atlantic ocean with similar vegetation to the Amazon basin. J. J. Morrone (2006) defines the Amazonian subregion in this broader sense, divided into the biogeographical provinces of Guyana, Humid Guyana, Napo, Imeri, Roraima, Amapá, Várzea, Ucayali, Madeira, Tapajós-Xingu, Pará, Yungas and Pantanal. The World Wildlife Fund takes a similar scope, where the Amazon biome includes the Guiana Shield rain forests in the north and the Chiquitano dry forests of Bolivia.

The biome covers parts of Brazil, Bolivia, Peru, Ecuador, Colombia, Venezuela, Guyana, Suriname and French Guiana. In Brazil the biome covers more than 4,100,000 square kilometres (1,600,000 sq mi) and covers all or parts of the states of Acre, Amazonas, Roraima, Rondônia, Pará, Amapá, Maranhão, Tocantins and Mato Grosso. The Amazon biome covers 49.29% of Brazil. 16% of the biome is in Peru. As of 2015 about 23.4% of Peru's Amazon biome was protected, but of this less than half was fully protected.

== Physical environment ==
=== Terrain ===
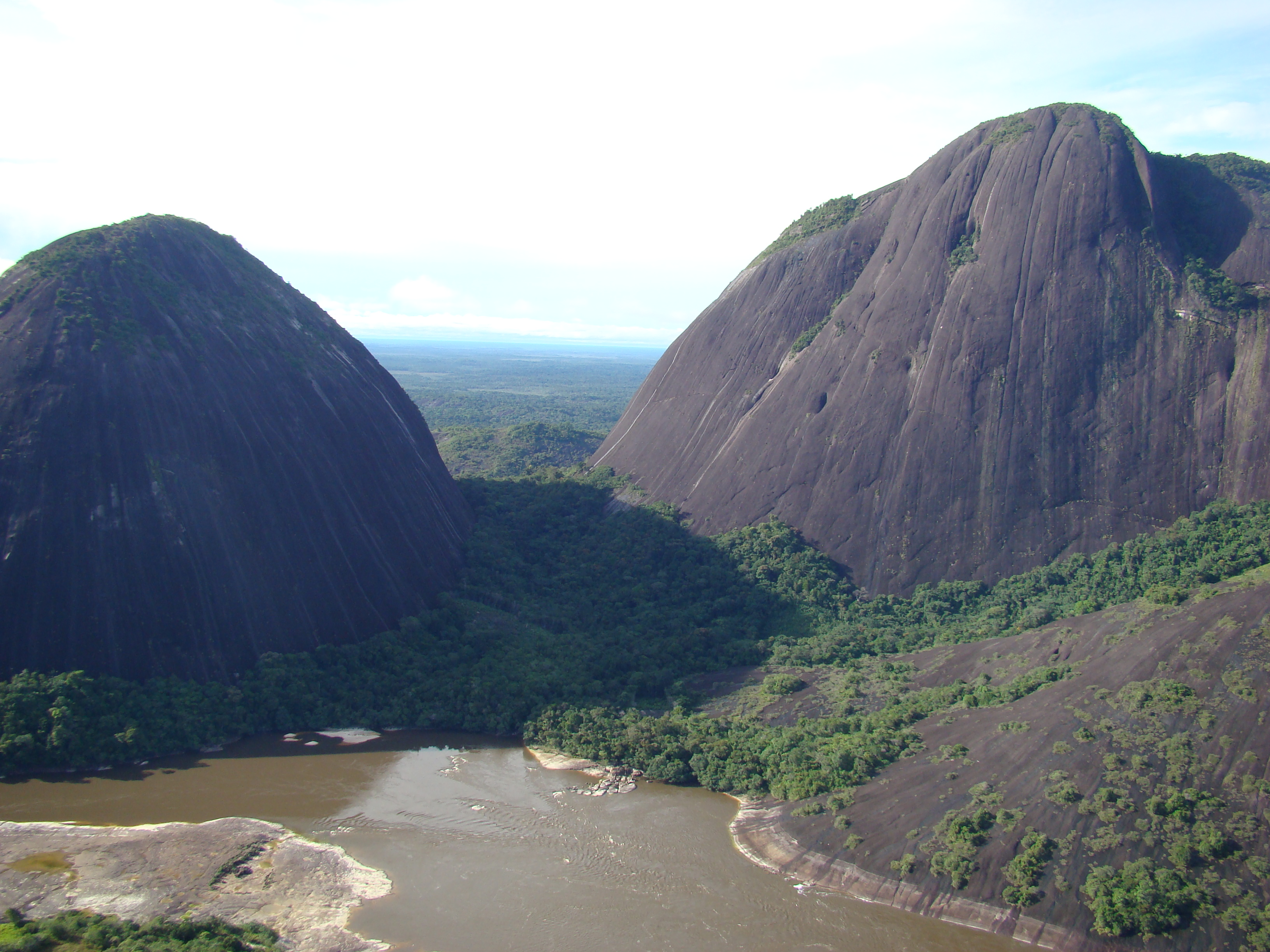
Cerros de Mavecure in the Guiana Shield in Colombia

Much of the terrain of the Amazon biome, particularly around the rivers, is lowland plains. The Guiana Shield is an area of highlands along the border between Brazil and Venezuela and Guyana. The southern Amazonian highlands cross parts of Rondonia and Mato Grosso and the southern parts of Amazonas and Para.

The Amazon basin is crossed by ridges or "paleoarches" that connect the Guiana and Central Brazil shields and divide it into geological sub-basins. They are the Iquitos or Jutai Arch in Peru and Acre, the Carauari Arch across the Rio Negro and Solimões, the Purus Arch to the west of Manaus, the Monte Alegre Arch to the west of the Tapajós and the Gurupa Arch to the west of Marajó. Under the Paleoarch model, paleobasins between the arches form centers for biological diversification. Thus the Iquitos arch is considered the main reason for the different species of frogs and rodents and different forest types on either side of the ridge.

=== Soil ===
The soil is generally very poor in nutrients, and areas that have been deforested are often unsuitable for agriculture or pasture. A large part of the phosphorus necessary for life is blown by the wind from Africa; as diatomeous dust from the Bodélé Depression and as smoke due to biomass burning in Africa. There are wide regional variations in soil types. Thus 20% of the Rio Negro basin is covered by podzols and 55% by acrisols and ferralsols, with the remainder covered by alluvial and litholic soils and scattered areas of hydromorphic plinthosols. In the biome as a whole podzols cover just 136,000 square kilometres (53,000 sq mi), or 2.7% of the area.

=== Climate ===
In Brazil the average temperature of the biome is 22 to 26 °C (72 to 79 °F) and average rainfall is 2,300 millimetres (91 in), but there are wide variations from one region to another. The biome as a whole has annual rainfall from 1,500 to 3,000 millimetres (59 to 118 in), about half of which is carried by winds from the Atlantic, and the other half from evapotranspiration within the biome. There are wide variations in total rainfall and distribution of rainfall throughout the year.

=== Water ===
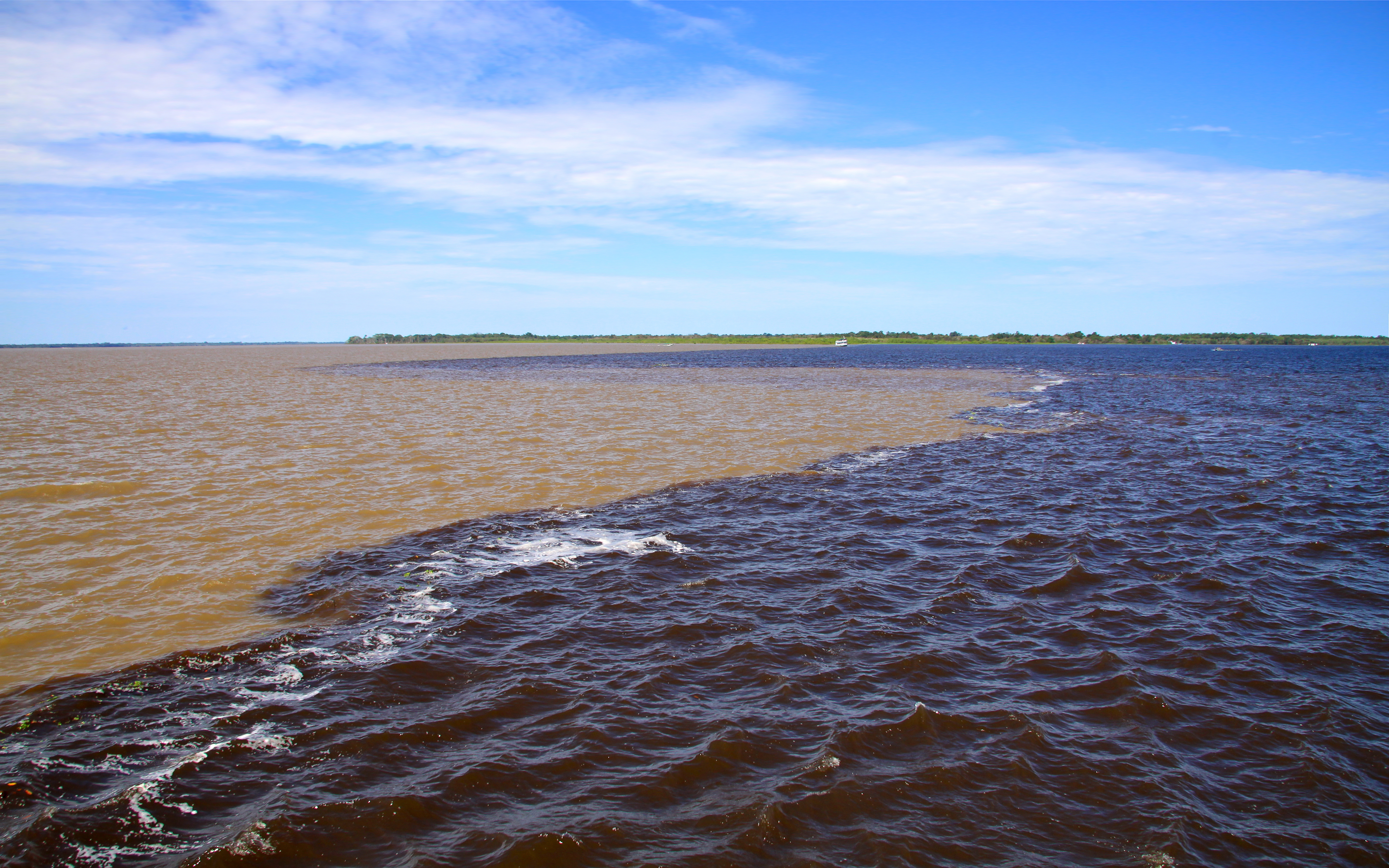
White water of the Solimões and black water of the Rio Negro converge to form the Amazon River

The Amazon watershed covers about 5,846,100 square kilometres (2,257,200 sq mi). The Amazon River accounts for 15–16% of the total water discharged by rivers into the oceans of the world. Rivers may be blackwater, whitewater or clearwater. Thus the Rio Negro ("Black River") has clear, jet-black water caused by decomposition of organic matter in swamps along its margins, combined with low levels of silt. The Rio Branco ("White River") and the Amazon itself have yellowish waters loaded with silt. The Tahuayo River in the Tamshiyacu Tahuayo Regional Conservation Area of Peru is classed as a blackwater river, but often has similar chemistry to the whitewater rivers of the region since it is in the Amazon River floodplain, and receives water from the Amazon.

The Amazon and its major tributaries such as the Xingu, Tapajós, Madeira, Purus and Rio Negro form barriers to the geodispersal of plants, animals and even insects. Thus the white-fronted capuchin (Cebus albifrons) and hairy saki (Pithecia hirsuta) are found west of the Tapajós, while the white-nosed saki (Chiropotes albinasus) is only found east of the river. The World Wildlife Fund divides the biome into ecoregions, often defined as the regions lying between major tributaries of the Amazon.

== Ecosystems ==
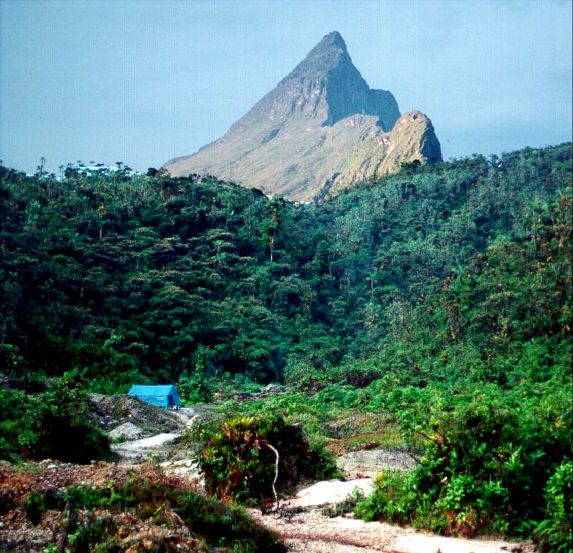
Pico da Neblina on the Brazil–Venezuela border. The Pico da Neblina National Park has a variety of ecosystems.

Most of the interior of the Amazon basin is covered by rainforest. The dense tropical Amazon rainforest is the largest tropical rainforest in the world. It covers between 5,500,000 and 6,200,000 square kilometres (2,100,000 and 2,400,000 sq mi) of the 6,700,000 to 6,900,000 square kilometres (2,600,000 to 2,700,000 sq mi) Amazon biome. The somewhat vague numbers are because the rainforest merges into similar biomes across its boundaries. The rainforest is Tropical Broadleaf Forest, so-called because most of the trees have broad leaves. The basin also holds flooded riparian forest or várzea, seasonal forest and savanna. Seasonal forest covers much of the southeast border, with marked dry seasons when there are frequent fires. The Amazon biome contains areas of other types of vegetation including grasslands, swamps, bamboos, and palm forests.

There are 53 major ecosystems and more than 600 types of land and freshwater habitat. Of the ecosystems, 34 are forest areas covering 78% of the biome, 6 are Andean covering 1.5%, 5 are floodplains covering 5.83%, 5 are savanna covering 12.75% and two are tropical steppes covering 1.89%. The Brazilian Amazon holds 30 of the 53 ecosystems, of which 19 are forests with 77.5% of the area. The borders of the biome hold ecotones where it blends into other biomes such as the cerrado.

Within and across the ecosystems of the biome there is huge biological diversity. One source says there are an estimated 60,000 plant species, of which 30,000 are endemic. Another says there are 30,000 to 50,000 plant species. The Brazilian Ministry of the Environment as of January 2013 listed 2,500 species of trees and 30,000 species of plants. There are 1,400 species of fish, 163 amphibians, 387 reptiles and more than 500 mammals including 90 primates. 87% of the amphibians, 62% of reptiles, 20% of birds and 25% of mammals are endemic to the biome. 109 species of lizards and amphisbaena reptiles are known to be present, and 138 species of snakes. Of the 1,300 bird species 20% are endemic and 8.4% are endangered.

A relatively small area may contain a variety of ecoregions. Thus the Pico da Neblina National Park in the north of Amazonas, Brazil contains campinarana, dense rainforest and contact between campinarana and rainforest. The vegetation formations include terra firme forests and igapós. Submontane forests climb the first steps of the Guiana Plateau to about 1,000 metres (3,300 ft), followed by montane forests. Lichens and bromeliads are found up to 2,000 metres (6,600 ft). There is also alpine tundra in the tabular plateaus.

=== Moist forest ===
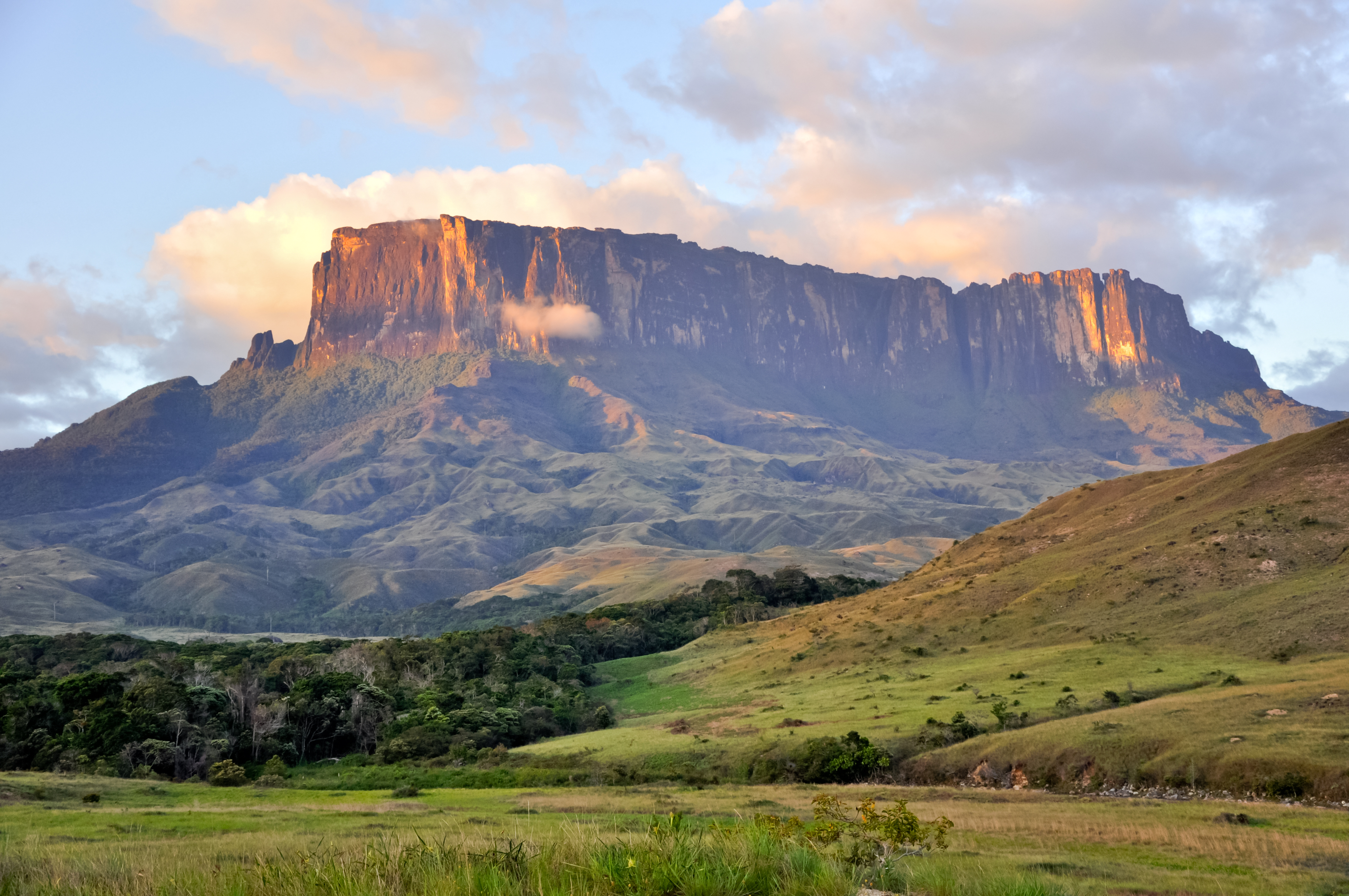
Kukenan Tepuy in Venezuela. The tops of the Tepuis have unique vegetation.

The Amazon basin contains several large areas of moist forest, collectively called the Amazon rainforest. These are the Caquetá, Japurá–Solimões–Negro, Juruá–Purus, Madeira–Tapajós, Napo, Purus–Madeira, Solimões–Japurá, Southwest Amazon, Tapajós–Xingu, Tocantins–Araguaia–Maranhão, Uatuma–Trombetas, Ucayali, and Xingu–Tocantins–Araguaia moist forests. Each has distinctive vegetation. In the broad definition favored by the World Wide Fund for Nature (WWF) the Amazon biome would also include the Tepuis, table-top mountains with unique vegetation, the Negro-Branco, Guianan Highlands, Guianan piedmont and lowland and Guianan moist forests and the Guianan savanna.

In the southwest Amazon at least 161,500 square kilometres (62,400 sq mi) of forest are dominated by bamboos. These occur in areas where there has been recent tectonic uplift combined with fast mechanical erosion and poor drainage. In each patch of bamboos all the plants flower every 27–28 years, producing huge numbers of seeds, before dying. The Chandless State Park is in the centre of the bamboo forest region of the south western Amazon biome, and has three endemic species of the Guadua genus of bamboo. Vegetation is classified as forest with palms, forest with bamboo, alluvial forest with bamboo and dense forest.

=== Flooded forest ===
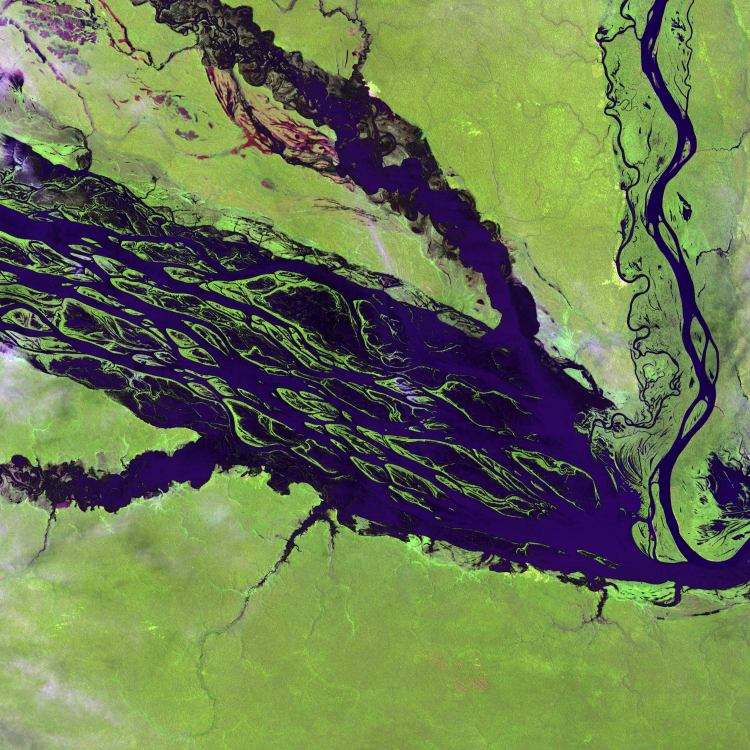
Igapó of Jaú National Park as seen from Landsat 7

Before Ghillean Prance's 1979 study, the local people and many scientists called the permanently waterlogged swamp on the lower Amazon "igapó" and all types of periodically flooded land "várzea". A more recent definition, from Prance, is:

Type of flooding	Type of water	Name	Alternative names
Seasonal	Whitewater	Seasonal várzea	
Seasonal	Blackwater	Seasonal igapó	
Tidal	Salt water	Mangrove	
Tidal	Fresh water back-up	Tidal várzea	
Irregular rainfall		Floodplain forest	Riparian forest along low order rivers
Permanent	Whitewater	Permanent swamp forest	várzea swamp forest, várzea chavascal
Permanent	Blackwater and clearwater	Permanent igapó	Long-term inundated forests

Major flooded areas include the Iquitos, Purus, Monte Alegre, Gurupa and Marajó várzeas. The Majaró várzea is at the mouth of the Amazon and is affected by both freshwater and tidal flows.

=== Campina and campinarana ===
Campina is open forest on sandy soil where sunlight can reach the ground. More than half the species of orchid in the Amazon lowlands are found in this type of forest. The terms campina and campinarana both describe white sand savannas that are very poor in nutrients. They may be flooded periodically or seasonally, in which case the roots suffer from lack of aeration. The vegetation is stunted. For some, campina is distinguished as being completely treeless. The term "campinarana" is used for the transition between campina and the rainforest.

Campinarana is found in isolated areas of the Rio Negro and Rio Branco basins in the north of Brazil. Patches of campinarana, which may cover several thousand square kilometres, are found in the transitional region from the Guyana Shield to the Amazon basin. Campinarana is typically found on leached white sands around circular swampy depressions in lowland tropical moist forest. The soil is low in nutrients, with highly acidic humus. Campinarana includes savannah, scrub and forests. The savannah is mainly composed of grasses and lichens, found in the wet plains beside lakes and rivers. The scrub has bare sand, herbaceous plants, shrubs and trees less than 7 metres (23 ft) high.

The nutrient-poor Japurá-Solimões-Negro moist forest is similar to the Rio Negro Campinarana.

=== Restinga ===
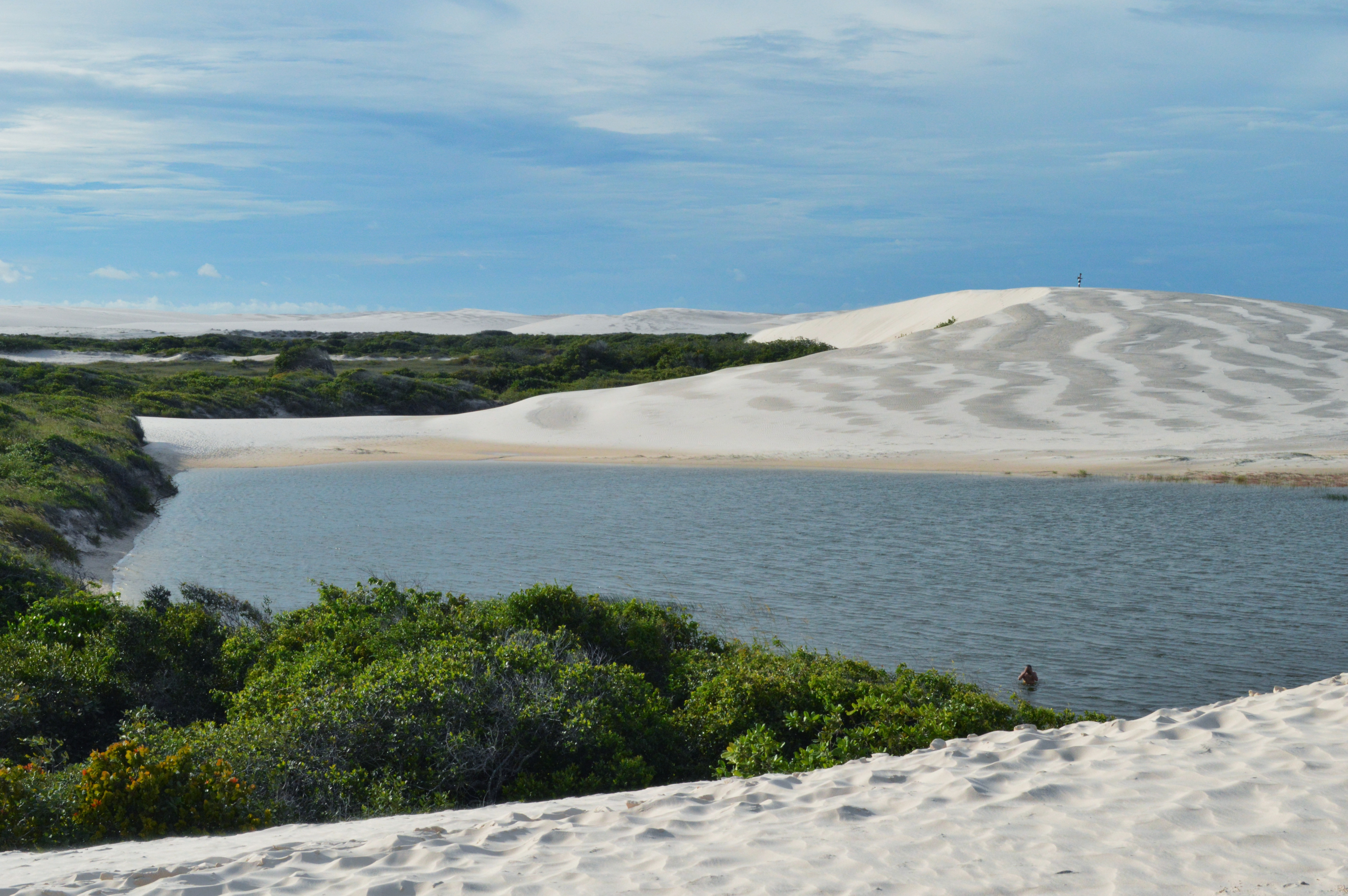
Dunes and vegetation in Lençóis Maranhenses National Park

The Northeastern Brazil restingas are coastal dune habitats that extend along the coast of northeastern Brazil, interspersed with lagoons, mangroves and patches of caatinga savanna. The land behind the dunes may include dwarf palms, bromeliads, ferns, shrubs, grasses and scrub trees. The more exposed areas mainly hold medium-tall grasses and scrub trees, while sheltered areas hold patches of cactus and low dry thicket. Fauna include marmosets and jaguarundis, proboscis bats, lesser sac-winged bats, bulldog bats, and Davy's naked-backed bats, wood stork, roseate spoonbill, white-necked heron, great egret, cattle egret, black-crowned night heron, and Neotropic cormorant. The ecoregion has various endemic species. The Lençóis Maranhenses National Park protects a large area of this habitat.

== Conservation ==
Of the 1,149 federal and state protected areas in Brazil in 2014, 247 covering 1,100,000 square kilometres (420,000 sq mi) were in the Amazon biome and accounted for 73% of the total area protected at the federal and state levels in Brazil. Federal units covered 587,000 square kilometres (227,000 sq mi) and state units covered 523,000 square kilometres (202,000 sq mi). These included fully protected national and state parks (22%), ecological stations (9%), biological reserves (4%) and wildlife refuges as well as sustainable use national and state forests (26%), environmental protection areas (17%), extractive reserves (12%), sustainable development reserves (10%), and areas of ecological interest. More than 15,000 square kilometres (5,800 sq mi) of the Brazilian Amazon biome was deforested in 2008–12, of which only 6% took place within protected areas. 71% of federal and state protected areas in Brazil suffered no deforestation in this period.

Although the World Economic Forum ranks Brazil first in the world in terms of nature tourism potential, the country is 52nd in tourism competitiveness when factors such as infrastructure are considered. Low public use, in part due to the inaccessibility of the Amazon national and federal parks, mean that they fail to support the local economies and therefore lack support from society, especially the local communities. The national and state forests have low levels of formal sustainable logging contracts, the Tapajós National Forest in Pará being an exception. Brazil has strong systems for monitoring land cover and deforestation, but as of 2014 64% of managers of protected areas said they had not monitored biodiversity in the previous five years, and more than half said they did not have tools to monitor social and environmental development.

== Threats ==
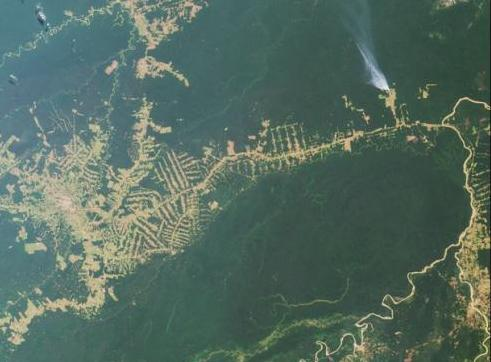
Rio Branco and BR-364 in 2000 showing "herringbone" patterns of deforestation

The "Arc of Deforestation" is in the eastern and southern borders of the biome. As of 2006 about 16% of the Amazon biome in Brazil had been deforested. Satellite images show that in the 2006–11 period total deforestation in the Amazon biome was 45,100 square kilometres (17,400 sq mi), of which 34,700 hectares (86,000 acres) were in the three soy-producing states of Mato Grosso, Para and Rondonia. A 2009 survey showed that of 620 recently deforested areas 203, or 32%, had been converted to pasture while 12, or less than 1%, were being used for soybeans.

The biome is not the same as the Amazônia Legal, which covers a larger area of Brazil. The Amazon biome covers about 82% of the Legal Amazon if cerrado and campinarana are excluded. Defenders of soybean farming point out that the soybean farms in the Amazonia Legal mostly occupy cerrado areas, not the Amazon biome. A statement by Cargill in 2006 said, "Soy occupies less than 0.6 percent of the land in the Amazon biome today, and most of that soy is grown on the fringes of the Amazon biome in the transitional area between the Cerrado and the forest. A 2010 assessment of soybean farmers associated with the Grupo André Maggi found that 62.55% of the properties produced 78.09% of the crop in the cerrado biome, while 37.45% produced 21.91% of the crop in the Amazon biome.

In 2000 the Brazilian government banned creation of sugarcane plantations in the Amazon biome. In 2010 a presidential decree made low-interest credit available to oil palm development, but only on land that had been deforested before 2008. This may prove an environmentally sustainable economic solution.

== Sources ==
- Ab'Sáber, Aziz Nacib (1996), Amazônia: do discurso à práxis, EdUSP, ISBN 978-85-314-0091-9
- Abad-Franch, Fernando; Monteiro, Fernando A. (2 July 2007), "Biogeography and evolution of Amazonian triatomines (Heteroptera: Reduviidae): implications for Chagas disease surveillance in humid forest ecoregions" (PDF), Memórias do Instituto Oswaldo Cruz, 102 (Suppl 1), Rio de Janeiro: Instituto Oswaldo Cruz: 57–70, doi:10.1590/s0074-02762007005000108, PMID 17906805
- About the Amazon, WWF Global
- "Amazon Basin Ecoregions", Global Forest Atlas, Yale University, archived from the original on 2021-01-23
- Amazon Biome: protected areas: Coordinated audit, Brasília: Federal Court of Accounts of Brazil, 2014, archived from the original on 2024-07-28
- Barbosa, Luiz C. (8 May 2015), Guardians of the Brazilian Amazon Rainforest: Environmental Organizations and Development, Routledge, ISBN 978-1-317-57764-5
- Barkley, Anne E.; Prospero, Joseph M.; Mahowald, Natalie; Hamilton, Douglas S.; Popendorf, Kimberly J.; Oehlert, Amanda M.; Pourmand, Ali; Gatineau, Alexandre; Panechou-Pulcherie, Kathy; Blackwelder, Patricia; Gaston, Cassandra J. (13 August 2019), "African biomass burning is a substantial source of phosphorus deposition to the Amazon, Tropical Atlantic Ocean, and Southern Ocean", Proceedings of the National Academy of Sciences, 116 (33): 16216–16221, Bibcode:2019PNAS..11616216B, doi:10.1073/pnas.1906091116, PMC 6697889, PMID 31358622
- Biswas, Asit K. (13 September 2013), Managing Transboundary Waters of Latin America, Routledge, ISBN 978-1-135-71524-3
- Brandão, Frederico; Schoneveld, George (24 November 2015), The state of oil palm development in the Brazilian Amazon: Trends, value chain dynamics, and business models, CIFOR, GGKEY:PRA2AW1CFJQ
- Carvalho, Anelena L. de; Nelson, Bruce W.; Bianchini, Milton C.; Plagnol, Daniela; Kuplich, Tatiana M.; Daly, Douglas C. (24 January 2013), "Bamboo-Dominated Forests of the Southwest Amazon: Detection, Spatial Extent, Life Cycle Length and Flowering Waves", PLOS ONE, 8 (1: e54852) e54852, Bibcode:2013PLoSO...854852C, doi:10.1371/journal.pone.0054852, PMC 3554598, PMID 23359438
- Dubey, Nawal Kishore (18 December 2014), Plants as a Source of Natural Antioxidants, CABI, ISBN 978-1-78064-266-6
- Guinness (8 September 2016), Guinness World Records 2017, Guinness World Records, ISBN 978-1-910561-34-8
- Hilty, Jodi A. (11 June 2012), Climate and Conservation: Landscape and Seascape Science, Planning, and Action, Island Press, ISBN 978-1-61091-203-7
- "Intro: Amazon Ecoregions and Ecology", Global Forest Atlas, Yale University, archived from the original on 2017-03-09
- Junk, Wolfgang J.; Piedade, Maria T. F.; Wittmann, Florian; Schöngart, Jochen; Parolin, Pia (27 September 2010), Amazonian Floodplain Forests: Ecophysiology, Biodiversity and Sustainable Management, Springer Science & Business Media, ISBN 978-90-481-8725-6
- Landers, John N. (2007), Tropical Crop-livestock Systems in Conservation Agriculture: The Brazilian Experience, Food and Agriculture Organization of the United Nations, ISBN 978-92-5-105692-9
- Miranda, Francisco (2014), "Habitats of the large-flowered Cattleya species in Brazil", Renziana Vol. 4: Cattleya, vol. 4, Schweizerische Orchideenstiftung, GGKEY:SYBKXNW1QC1
- Morrone, J. J. (2006), "Biogeographic areas and transition zones of Latin America and the Caribbean islands based on panbiogeographic and cladistic analyses of the entomofauna", Annu Rev Entomol, 51: 467–494, doi:10.1146/annurev.ento.50.071803.130447, PMID 16332220
- "Negro River", Encyclopædia Britannica, 20 February 2015
- "Northeastern Brazil restingas (NT0144)", National Geographic, 2010, archived from the original on 2010-03-08
- Parque Nacional do Pico da Neblina (in Portuguese), Via Rural, archived from the original on 2017-03-03
- Patterson, Bruce D.; Costa, Leonora P. (1 May 2012), Bones, Clones, and Biomes: The History and Geography of Recent Neotropical Mammals, University of Chicago Press, ISBN 978-0-226-64921-4
- Pena, Rodolfo Alves, "Bioma Amazônia", Brasil Escola (in Portuguese)
- Penn, Jim; Neise, Greg, The Importance of Blackwater Rivers in the Amazon, RCF: Rainforest Conservation Fund
- Pereira, O.J.R.; Monies, C.R.; Lucas, Y.; Melfi, A.J. (6 April 2016), "Evaluation of Pedotransfer Equations to Predict Deep Soil Carbon Stock in Tropical Podzols Compared to Other Soils of the Brazilian Amazon Forest", Digital Soil Morphometrics, Springer, ISBN 978-3-319-28295-4
- PES Chandless (in Portuguese), ISA: Instituto Socioambiental
- "Regiões Fitoecológicas – Campinarana", Ambiente Brasil (in Portuguese), 9 January 2009
- "Rio Negro campinarana", Global Species, archived from the original on 2016-06-10
- Sears, Robin, Central Amazonia in Brazil and parts of Bolivia (NT0135), WWF: World Wildlife Fund
- Sears, Robin, NT0158: Northern South America: Northwestern Brazil and eastern Colombia, World Wildlife Fund
- Secretaria de Planejamento (1975), Tipos e aspectos do Brasil: excertos da Revista brasileira de geografia, Secretaria de Planejamento da Presidência da República, Fundação Instituto Brasileiro de Geografia e Estatística, Directoria Técnica, Departamento de Documentação e Divulgação Geográfica e Cartográfica
- Sioli, H. (2012-12-06), The Amazon: Limnology and landscape ecology of a mighty tropical river and its basin, Springer Science & Business Media, ISBN 978-94-009-6542-3
- Smith, Nigel (2014-09-26), Palms and People in the Amazon, Springer, ISBN 978-3-319-05509-1
- Tosta, Antonio Luciano de Andrade; Coutinho, Eduardo F. (14 December 2015), Brazil, ABC-CLIO, ISBN 978-1-61069-258-8
- WildFinder, WWF: World Wildlife Fund
- Wuerthner, George; Crist, Eileen; Butler, Tom (19 February 2015), Protecting the Wild: Parks and Wilderness, the Foundation for Conservation, Island Press, ISBN 978-1-61091-548-9
- Yu, Hongbin (2015), "The fertilizing role of African dust in the Amazon rainforest: A first multiyear assessment based on data from Cloud-Aerosol Lidar and Infrared Pathfinder Satellite Observations", Geophysical Research Letters, 42 (6): 1984–1991, Bibcode:2015GeoRL..42.1984Y, doi:10.1002/2015GL063040
