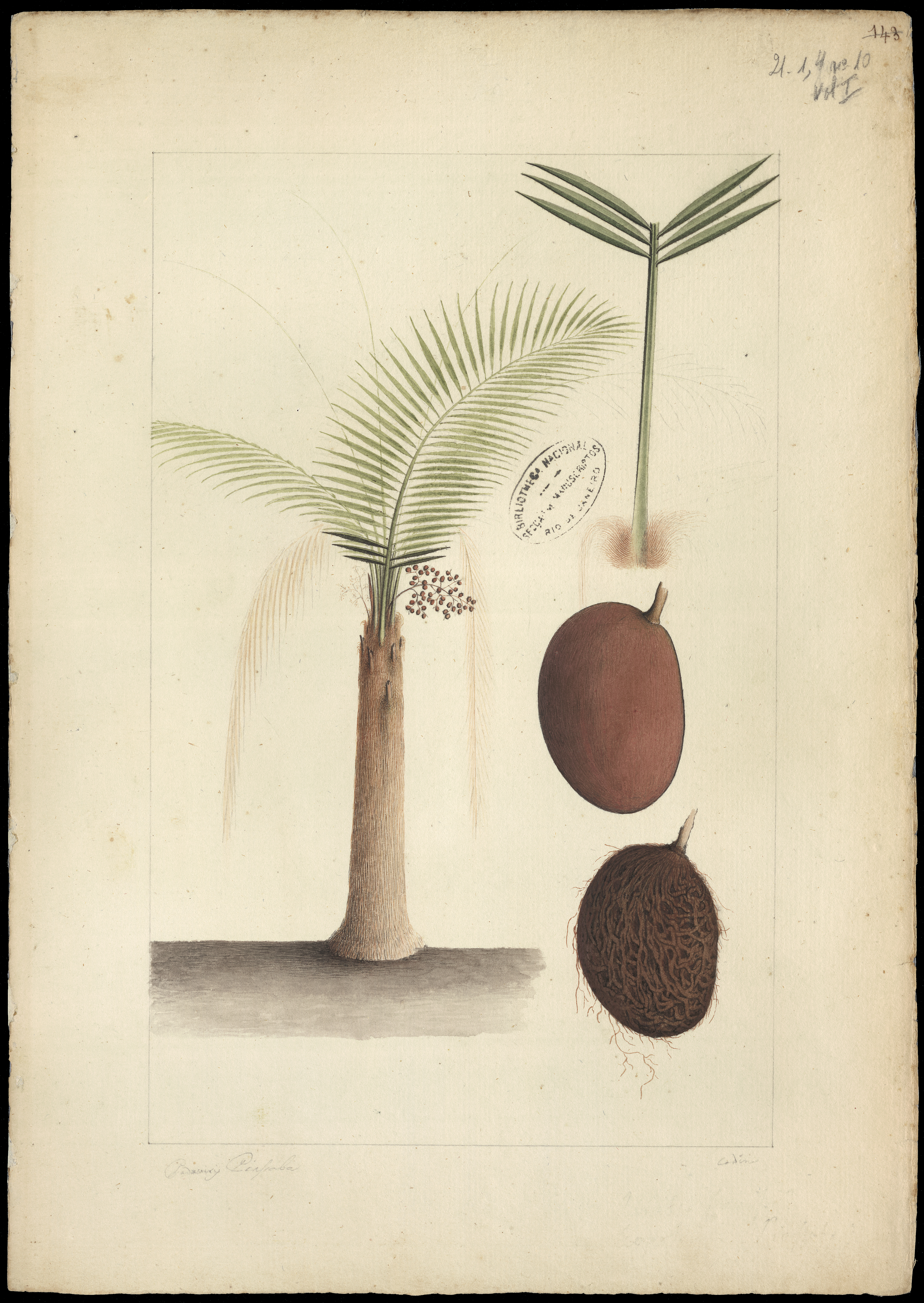
- Illustration by Joaquim José Codina

Scientific classification
- Kingdom: Plantae
- Clade: Tracheophytes
- Clade: Angiosperms
- Clade: Monocots
- Clade: Commelinids
- Order: Arecales
- Family: Arecaceae
- Genus: Leopoldinia
- Species: L. piassaba

Binomial name
- Leopoldinia piassaba Wallace

= Leopoldinia piassaba =

Species of palm tree

Leopoldinia piassaba, the Para piassava, piassava fiber palm or piassava palm, is a palm native to black water rivers in Amazonian Brazil and Venezuela, from which is extracted piassava, a high caliber and water resistant fiber. Piassaba fiber is made into brooms, baskets and other products. This plant is also a natural habitat of the Rhodnius brethesi which is a potential vector of Chagas disease and it is cited in Flora Brasiliensis by Carl Friedrich Philipp von Martius.
