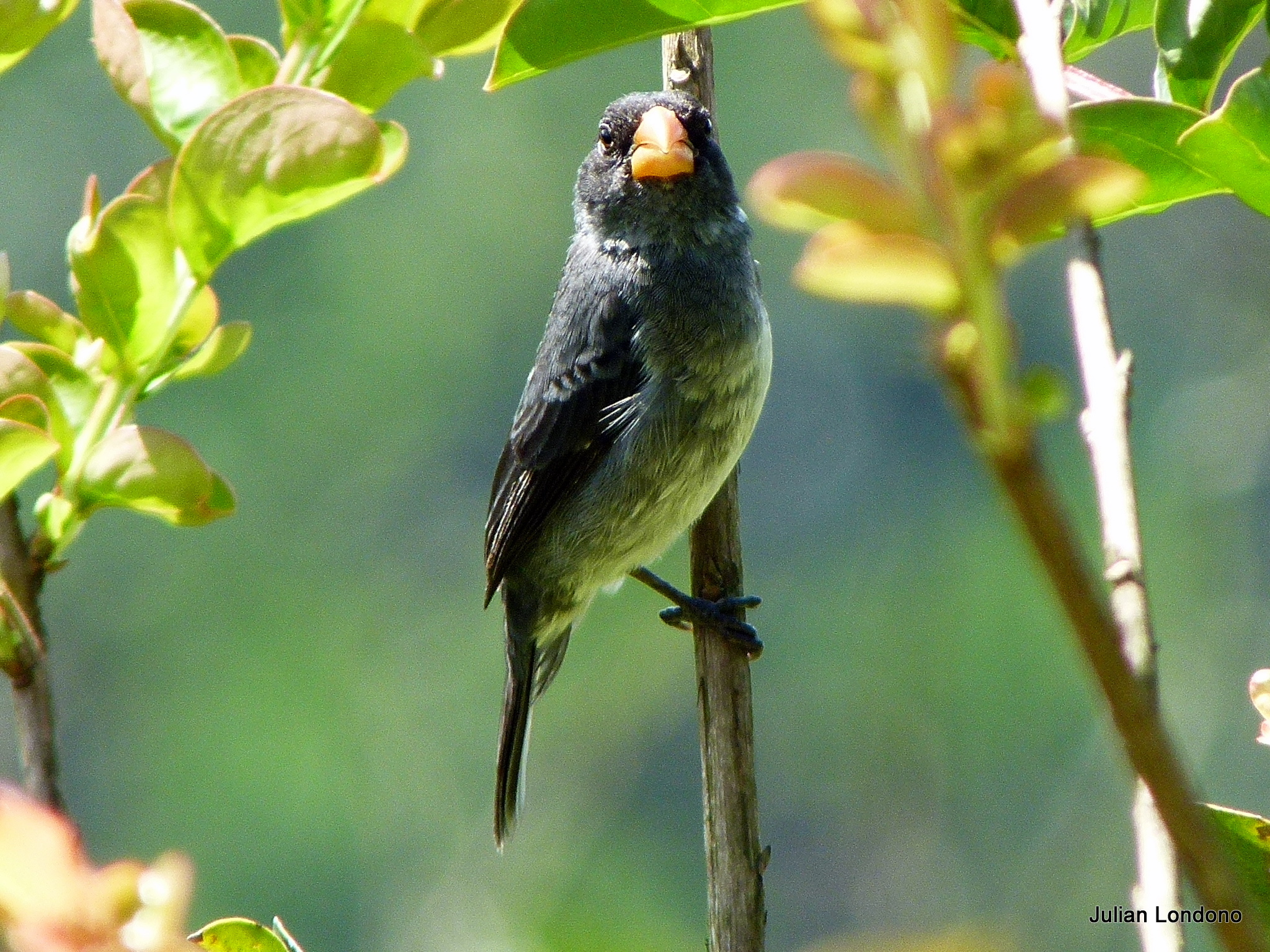

Conservation status
- Least Concern (IUCN 3.1)

Scientific classification
- Kingdom: Animalia
- Phylum: Chordata
- Class: Aves
- Order: Passeriformes
- Family: Thraupidae
- Genus: Sporophila
- Species: S. intermedia

Binomial name
- Sporophila intermedia Cabanis, 1851

= Grey seedeater =

Species of bird

The grey seedeater (Sporophila intermedia) is a species of bird in the family Thraupidae, the tanagers and allies. It is found in Brazil, Colombia, Guyana, and Venezuela. It also possibly has occurred in Ecuador, has occurred in French Guiana as a vagrant, and has possibly been extirpated from Trinidad.

== Taxonomy and systematics ==
The grey seedeater has a complicated taxonomic history. It was formally described in 1851 with its current binomial Sporophila intermedia. At the time genus Sporophila was a member of the family Fringillidae. By 1970 Sporophila had been reassigned to the family Emberizidae. Based on studies published between 1988 and 2011, beginning in 2012 the genus was moved to its present position in the tanager family Thraupidae.

As of early 2026 the grey seedeater's taxonomy is unsettled. The IOC and AviList assign it these three subspecies:

- S. i. intermedia Cabanis, 1851
- S. i. bogotensis (Gilliard, 1946)
- S. i. insularis (Gilliard, 1946)

The Clements taxonomy and BirdLife International's Handbook of the Birds of the World (HBW) do not recognize S. i. insularis but include it in the nominate subspecies S. i. intermedia. The putative S. i. insularis has some small color differences from the nominate "but the relative weakness of the characters involved, current lack of information on habitat and song differences, uncertainty about a possible migratory habit whereby records might refer only to non-breeding sympatry, and the well-known polymorphic capacity of Sporophila species combine to advise caution" are the basis for their treatment. The Cornell Lab of Ornithology's Birds of the World follows Clements.

To the extent possible this article follows the IOC/AviList three-subspecies model.

== Description ==
The grey seedeater is about 11 cm (4.3 in) long and weighs 11 to 16 g (0.39 to 0.56 oz). It has a short thick bill with a rounded culmen. The species is sexually dimorphic. Adult males of the nominate subspecies have a medium gray head, neck, and upperparts; the color has a blue cast. Their crown, mantle, and back have faint darker streaks. Their wings are blackish with medium gray edges on the coverts and tertials and white bases on the inner primaries. The last shows as a patch on the folded wing. Their tail is blackish. Their throat is medium gray, their breast a darker gray, and their belly, vent, and undertail coverts whitish. Adult females have a buffy brown crown and a paler, warmer, buffy brown face. Their nape, upperparts, wings, and tail are also buffy brown. Their throat, breast, and flanks are pale warm cinnamon and their belly and undertail coverts are a paler buff. Juveniles resemble adult females. Subspecies S. i. insularis is larger than the nominate with whitish patches on the lower ear coverts and a white band across the lower rump. S. i. bogotensis is darker overall than the nominate, with whitish patches on the ear coverts, larger white bases on the primaries, and a pale gray band between the darker throat and breast. Both sexes of all subspecies have a dark brown iris and blackish legs. Males have a pinkish orange bill and females a blackish one.

== Distribution and habitat ==
The nominate subspecies of the grey seedeater is found across northern Colombia and south into the lower valley of the Magdalena River and also from the center of the country north and east. From these two areas its range continues east across Venezuela except in the Andes and southeast and then into western Guyana and slightly into extreme northern Brazil's Roraima. Subspecies S. i. bogotensis is found on the western slope of Colombia's Western Andes and in the valleys of the Cauca and Magdalena rivers. The South American Classification Committee has at least one record of the species found as a vagrant in French Guiana and at least one unconfirmed record from Ecuador.

The status of S. i. insularis is uncertain. It was originally described as limited to Trinidad. Some sources also place it in northern Venezuela. As of December 2022 it was listed as extirpated from Trinidad, and AviList (2025) notes it as such. However, two were photographed there in December 2023. In addition, Birds of the World calls it "scarce to uncommon in Trinidad".

The grey seedeater inhabits open areas such as grasslands, shrubby forest clearings and edges, and vacant lots, parks, and gardens in urban areas. In elevation it ranges in Venezuela from sea level to 1,200 m (3,900 ft) north of the Orinoco River and to 300 m (1,000 ft) south of it and in Colombia to 2,400 m (7,900 ft). It reaches 500 m (1,600 ft) in its tiny Brazilian range.

== Behavior ==
=== Movement ===
The grey seedeater is a year-round resident though it might make some local movements.

=== Feeding ===
The grey seedeater feeds primarily on grass seed, especially those of Panicum species, and also includes small arthropods and nectar in its diet. It usually plucks seeds while clinging to grass stems, and takes flying insects in mid-air. In the breeding season it is usually seen singly or in pairs and outside that time forms small flocks.

=== Breeding ===
The grey seedeater breeds between May and October in Venezuela and formerly bred on Trinidad between June and September. Its nest is a cup made from rootlets and coarse plant fibers lined with finer fibers. It is typically in a tree fork between about 2 and 6 m (7 and 20 ft) above the ground. The clutch is two or three eggs that are cream colored with dark brown markings. Nothing else is known about the species' breeding biology.

=== Vocalization ===
The grey seedeater's song is "a spirited [series] of musical twitters, chips, and trills usually beginning chu chu chu-wee". Some individuals, and perhaps all, "incorporate mimetic phrases and songs, or partial songs, of many other birds into their own rambling songs". Its call is tseep?.

== Status ==
The IUCN has assessed the grey seedeater as being of Least Concern. It has a large range; its population size is not known but is believed to be stable. The IUCN states, "The only threat known to the species is localised trapping for the cagebird trade in Trinidad". This statement is based on version 1.01 (2020) of the Birds of the World account; it and version 1.1 (2024) state "Popular as a cagebird in Trinidad, and numbers there declining, perhaps because of both indiscriminate trapping and habitat destruction." Both versions call it "scarce to uncommon" on the island. It is considered fairly common in Colombia and very common in Venezuela.
