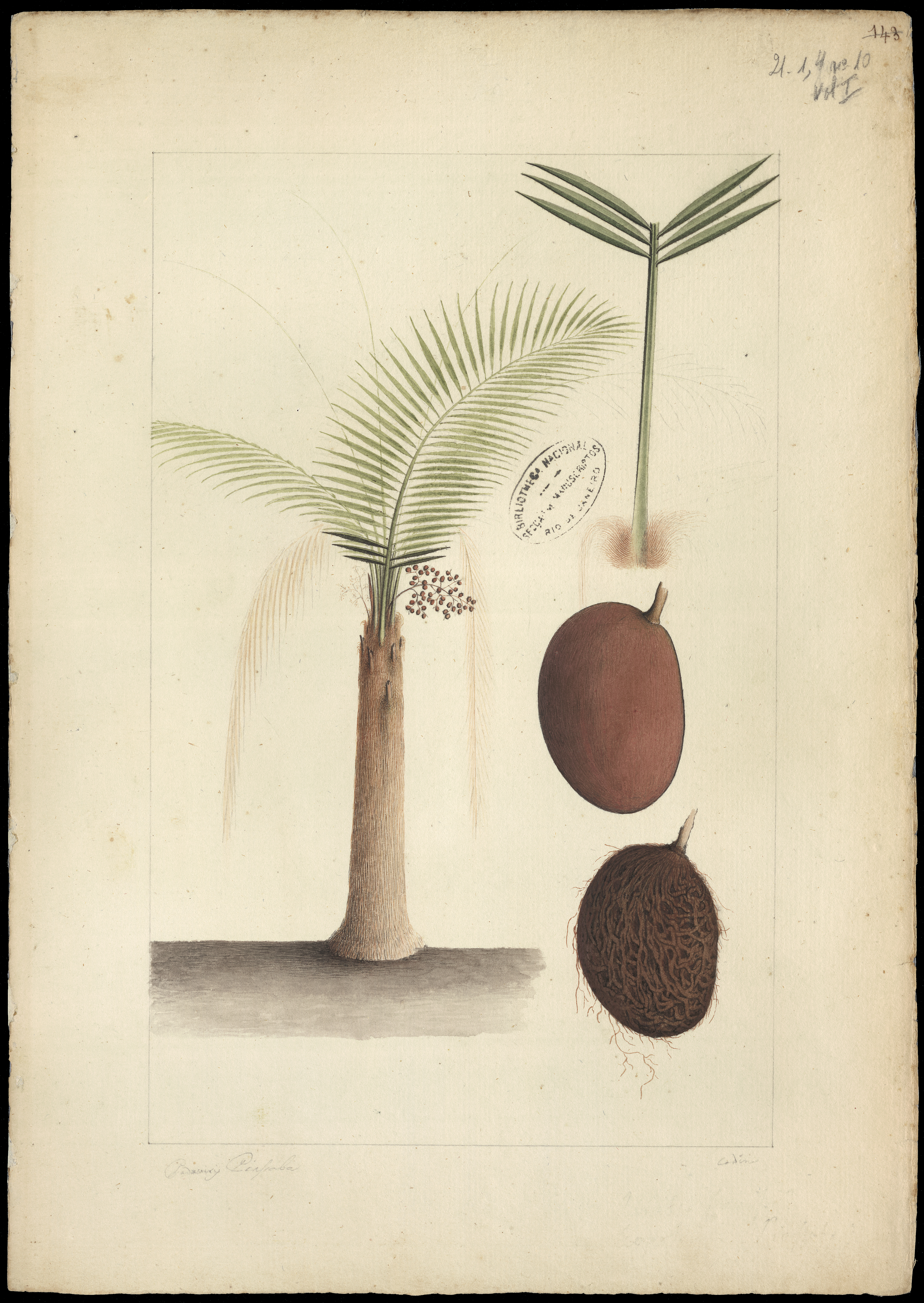
- Leopoldimia piassaba

Scientific classification
- Kingdom: Plantae
- Clade: Tracheophytes
- Clade: Angiosperms
- Clade: Monocots
- Clade: Commelinids
- Order: Arecales
- Family: Arecaceae
- Subfamily: Arecoideae
- Tribe: Leopoldinieae
- Genus: Leopoldinia; Mart.

Species
- Leopoldinia piassaba Wallace; Leopoldinia pulchra Mart.

= Leopoldinia =

Genus of palms

Leopoldinia is a mostly monoecious genus of flowering plant in the palm family from northern South America (Colombia, Venezuela, northwestern Brazil), where they are known as jará palm or pissava palm. The two known species are commercially important, especially L. piassaba, which yields sustenance and construction material. The genus is named for Maria Leopoldina, archduchess of Austria, and Brazilian empress.

== Description ==
The trunks are clustering in L. major, occasionally clustering in L. pulchra, and solitary in L. piassaba; they reach 15 cm wide to 6 m tall, and are usually covered in old, extremely fibrous leaf bases. The pinnate leaves, up to 5 m, are carried on long, hairy petioles which disintegrate into black, fibrous masses against the trunk. The 1 m leaflets are once-folded, linear, regularly arranged, and either acuminate or briefly bifid.

The much branched inflorescence is short, brown, and hairy and emerges within the leaf crown. There may be male and female flowers on different inflorescences, they may alternate along the same branches, in some cases the female flowers are proximal while the male's are distal, some are hermaphroditic and others are simply, but rarely, dioecious. Developing from one carpel, the fruit matures to red in color, may be ellipsoidal, laterally flattened or disciform, and contains one seed.

== Distribution and habitat ==
Endemic to western Brazil, southern Venezuela and Colombia's Amazonian regions, all are low lying and occupy periodically flooded, tropical rain forest. Both L. major and L. pulchra grow on stony islands and alongside the banks of the Rio Negro and other blackwater rivers; L. piassaba grows in conspicuous groves, most commonly on sandy flats. L. major is the only one which will reach and contribute to the forest canopy, the others are strictly undergrowth subjects.

== Cultivation and uses ==
Leopoldinia palms are rare in cultivation and practically unknown in herbaria but are extensively used in their natural range. The trunks are used in construction and as fence posts, the fruit from L. major is burned to create a salt substitute and L. piassaba leaves are used in construction. The fruit from L. piassaba is mashed and mixed with water creating a thick, alcoholic beverage; the tough, long leaf base fibers, known as pissava, are commercially viable as a source for rope, brooms, and other products.
