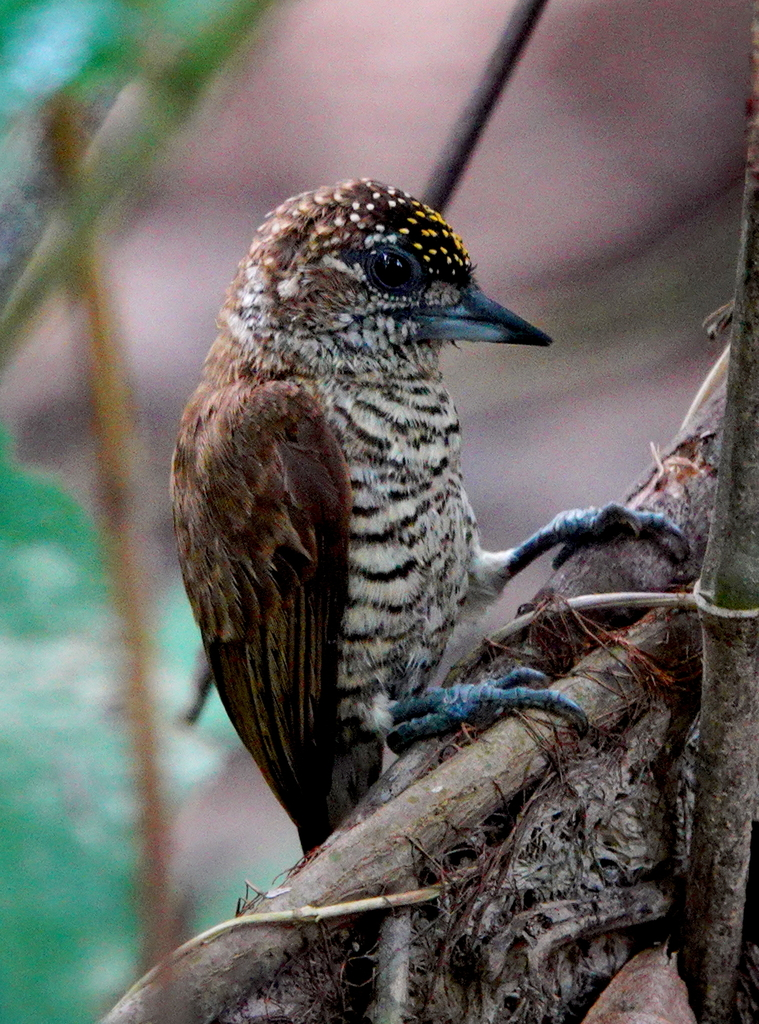

Conservation status
- Least Concern (IUCN 3.1)

Scientific classification
- Kingdom: Animalia
- Phylum: Chordata
- Class: Aves
- Order: Piciformes
- Family: Picidae
- Genus: Picumnus
- Species: P. pumilus

Binomial name
- Picumnus pumilus Cabanis & Heine, 1863

= Orinoco piculet =

Species of woodpecker

The Orinoco piculet (Picumnus pumilus) is a species of bird in subfamily Picumninae of the woodpecker family Picidae. It is found in Brazil, Colombia, and possibly Venezuela.

== Taxonomy and systematics ==
The Orinoco piculet was for a time considered a subspecies of Lafresnaye's piculet (P. lafresnayi), and they are now thought to form a superspecies. It is monotypic.

== Description ==
The Orinoco piculet is about 9 cm (3.5 in) long and weighs 9 to 10 g (0.32 to 0.35 oz). Adult males have a dark brown cap with yellow spots on the forehead and whiter ones on the rest of it. Their face is blackish with white spots, bare gray-blue skin around the eye, and a pale stripe behind the eye. Their upperparts are brownish green. Their primaries and secondaries are brown with greenish edges and tips. The upper side of their tail is black; the innermost pair of feathers have white inner webs and the outer three pairs have a white patch near the tip. Their chin, throat, and underparts are pale yellowish to buffy white with dark brown bars except in the center of the belly. The beak is blackish and the legs gray. Adult females are identical but for whitish spots on their entire crown. Juveniles are similar to adults but duller overall, greener above, and less evenly barred below.

== Distribution and habitat ==
According to the Clements taxonomy the Orinoco piculet is found in eastern Colombia, northwestern Brazil, and adjacent southern Venezuela's Amazonas state. However, the South American Classification Committee of the American Ornithological Society has no records from Venezuela. The species inhabits the edges of humid mature forest, the edges of gallery forest, and dense thickets. In elevation it mostly ranges up to 300 m (980 ft) but occurs locally as high as 500 m (1,600 ft).

== Behavior ==
=== Movement ===
As far as is known, the Orinoco piculet is a year-round resident throughout its range.

=== Feeding ===
The Orinoco piculet forages from the forest's lower strata to the canopy. Its diet has not been detailed but is assumed to be ants and other small insects.

=== Breeding ===
The Orinoco piculet's breeding season is thought to include November and December but nothing else is known about its breeding biology.

=== Vocalization ===
The Orinoco piculet's vocalizations have not been transcribed.

== Status ==
The IUCN has assessed the Orinoco piculet as being of Least Concern. It has a restricted range and its population size is not known and is believed to be decreasing. No immeditate threats have been identified. It is "[p]oorly known and probably uncommon."
