= Iquitos várzea =

Ecoregion in South America

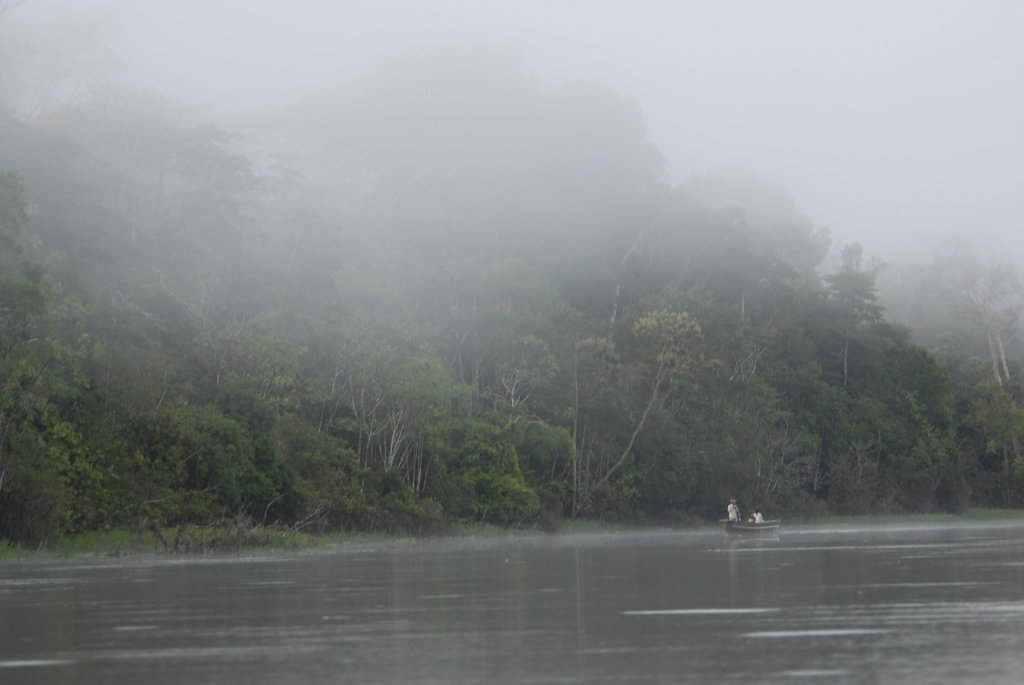
- Tamshiyacu Tahuayo Regional Conservation Area near Iquitos, Peru

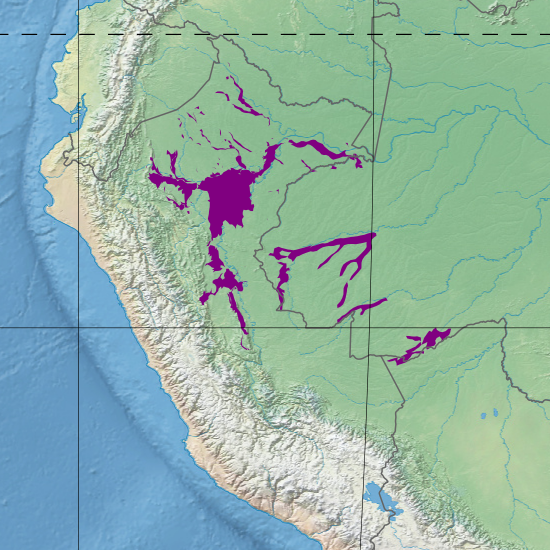
- Ecoregion territory (in purple)

Ecology
- Realm: Neotropical
- Biome: Tropical and subtropical moist broadleaf forests

Geography
- Area: 114,995.47 km^{2} (44,400.00 mi^{2})
- Countries: Brazil, Bolivia, Peru
- Coordinates: 5.170°S 74.755°W

The Iquitos várzea (NT0128) is an ecoregion of flooded forest along rivers in Brazil, Peru and Bolivia in the west of the Amazon biome. The forest is seasonally flooded up to 7 metres (23 ft) by whitewater rivers carrying nutrient-rich sediment from the Andes. The meandering rivers often shift course, creating a complex landscape of oxbow lakes, marshes, levees and bars, with grasslands, shrubs and forests in different stages of succession. During the extended flood periods fish enter the forest in search of fruit. The várzea is accessible by the navigable rivers that run through it, and has suffered from extensive deforestation to extract timber and create pasture for livestock.

== Location ==
The Iquitos várzea has an area of 11,499,547 hectares (28,416,000 acres) in northwest Brazil, northeast Peru and northern Bolivia. The várzea, or flooded forest, is found along seasonally flooded basins of tributaries of the upper Amazon River, and of the Amazon itself. To the west the Iquitos várzea extends to the highest places where várzea is found in the Amazon region. The eastern boundary is defined by the Iquitos arch, an ancient crystalline arch that crosses the Amazon basin. Beyond this arch the Iquitos várzea ecoregion merges into the Purus várzea ecoregion.

The Iquitos várzea is found along river sections within several other Amazon ecoregions. The southern sections of the Iquitos várzea are in the Southwest Amazon moist forests. The várzea forms the eastern boundary of the Ucayali moist forests and the Napo moist forests, and penetrates along river courses into both these ecoregions. It forms the southwest boundary of the Solimões–Japurá moist forests.

== Physical ==
The whitewater rivers carry sediments washed down from the Andes, which are deposited to form extremely fertile soil. The ecoregion is named after the Peruvian town of Iquitos on the Amazon, which floods twice a year, with floods lasting for up to 10 months. At its peak the forest is flooded by 6 to 7 metres (20 to 23 ft) of water across a stretch along the river 19 kilometres (12 mi) wide. The soil is made of alluvial and fluvial sediments deposited in the present Holocene epoch. The rivers meander through their floodplains and sometimes change course, creating oxbow lakes, levees, swales, point bars and short-lived islands. The shifting landscape holds large swathes of primary succession forest.

== Ecology ==
The Iquitos várzea ecoregion is in the Neotropical realm and the tropical and subtropical moist broadleaf forests biome.

=== Climate ===
The Köppen climate classification is "Af": equatorial, fully humid. Yearly average temperatures range from a minimum of 22 °C (72 °F) to a maximum of 32 °C (90 °F) with a mean of 27 °C (81 °F). Temperatures are fairly constant throughout the year, slightly cooler in July and slightly warmer in December. Annual rainfall in the region is from 2,250 to 3,050 millimetres (89 to 120 in). Monthly precipitation ranges from 80 millimetres (3.1 in) in July to 263 millimetres (10.4 in) in March. It typically rains on almost 300 days every year.

=== Flora ===
The floodplain holds forest mosaics, succession forest, aquatic vegetation in areas that are poorly drained and permanent swamps. The dominant vegetation is evergreen tropical forest. A few meters difference in elevation can have a major influence on the forest composition due to the effect of flooding. The flora also vary considerably depending on the soil and the stage of succession. The first vegetation to appear are grasses such as Gynerium sagittatum, Paspalum repens and Echinochloa polystachya. Woody shrubs then appear such as Adenaria floribunda, Alchornea castaneifolia and Salix martiana. Early succession trees follow including Annona hypoglauca, Astrocaryum jauari and Cecropia latiloba. The mature forests on old alluvial terraces hold trees of the genera Ceiba, Eschweilera, Hura, Spondias and Virola. These include Calycophyllum spruceanum, Ceiba samauma, Inga species, Cedrela odorata, Copaifera reticulata and Phytelephas macrocarpa.

The ecoregion often has large stands of buriti palm (Mauritia flexuosa) and Jessenia batuaua. The understory includes monocots in the genus Heliconia and families Zingiberaceae and Marantaceae, palms and epiphytes. On the upper Purus River the Guazuma rosea palm is common. Piptadenia pteroclada is common on the Amazon. Near Iquitos there are stands holding Parkia inundabilis, Septotheca tessmannii, Coumarouna micrantha, Ceiba burchellii, Ochroma lagopus, Manilkara inundata and Iryanthera tessmannii.

=== Fauna ===
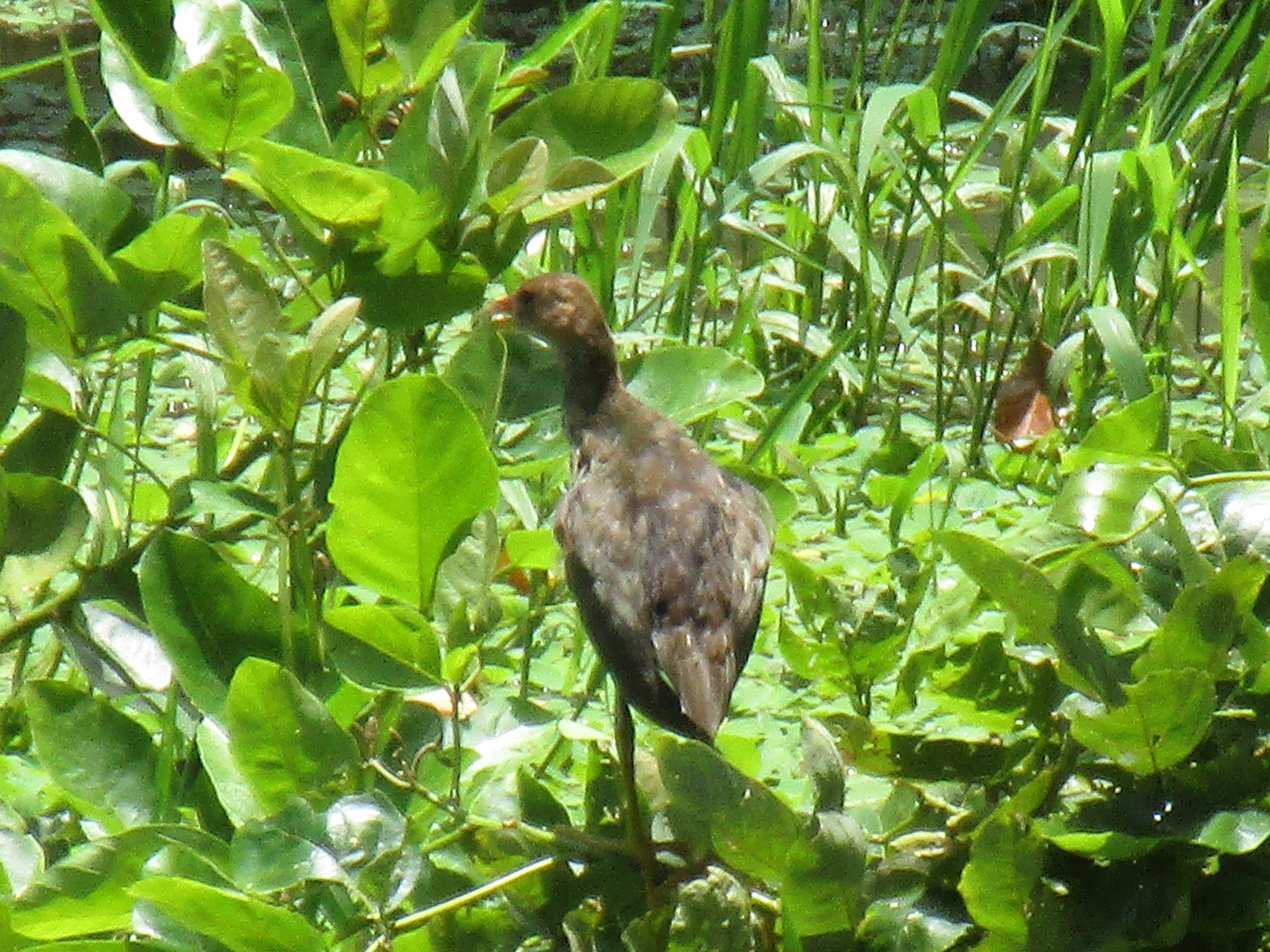
Bird near Nauta on the Marañón River

227 species of mammals have been recorded in the ecoregion. Common land mammals include jaguar (Panthera onca), ocelot (Leopardus pardalis), South American tapir (Tapirus terrestris), capybara (Hydrochoerus hydrochaeris), kinkajou (Potos flavus) and white-lipped peccary (Tayassu pecari). Primates include spider monkey (genus Ateles), white-fronted capuchin (Cebus albifrons), tufted capuchin (Sapajus apella), Venezuelan red howler (Alouatta seniculus), common squirrel monkey (Saimiri sciureus) and bald uakari (Cacajao calvus). Other mammals are the Amazon bamboo rat (Dactylomys dactylinus) and spiny tree-rats (genus Echimys).

Mammals that are rarely found elsewhere include the black-shouldered opossum (Caluromysiops irrupta), rufous mouse opossum (Marmosa lepida), red mouse opossum (Marmosa rubra), sepia short-tailed opossum (Monodelphis adusta), Geoffroy's tailless bat (Anoura geoffroyi), Bogotá yellow-shouldered bat (Sturnira bogotensis), Goeldi's marmoset (Callimico goeldii), Peruvian night monkey (Aotus miconax), equatorial saki (Pithecia aequatorialis) and Napo spiny rat (Proechimys quadruplicatus). Aquatic mammals include the Amazon river dolphin (Inia geoffrensis), tucuxi (Sotalia fluviatilis) and Amazonian manatee (Trichechus inunguis). Endangered mammals include the white-bellied spider monkey (Ateles belzebuth), Peruvian spider monkey (Ateles chamek) and giant otter (Pteronura brasiliensis).

624 species of birds have been reported. Endangered birds include the wattled curassow (Crax globulosa). There are 88 species of snakes and 30 species of lizards. Large reptiles include black caiman (Melanosuchus niger), yellow-spotted river turtle (Podocnemis unifilis) and green anaconda (Eunectes murinus). Endangered amphibians include Johnson's horned treefrog (Hemiphractus johnsoni).

Large fish that live in the whitewater rivers enter the forest during the floods where they eat and disperse fruit. Fish include pacu (genera Metynnis and Mylossoma), tambaqui (Colossoma macropomum), pirarucu (Arapaima gigas), dusky narrow hatchetfish (Triportheus angulatus) and pirana (genus Serrasalmus). Smaller fish include angelfish (Pterophyllum scalare), blue discus (Symphysodon aequifasciatus), cichlids (genus Cichlasoma), characins (family Anostomidae), tetras (genera Hemigrammus and Hyphessobrycon), neon tetra (Paracheirodon innesi) and catfish (families Aspredinidae, Callichthyidae, Doradidae and Loricariidae).

== Status ==
The World Wildlife Fund classes the ecoregion as "Vulnerable". Since the várzea is found along navigable rivers it has been considerably affected by human activity. Large parts are used by smallholders for mixed agriculture and forestry. Other large areas are cleared and burned by ranchers to be replaced by grasses for livestock. This eliminates food sources for fish. Deforestation also causes heavy sedimentation, which also damages the habitat. In some areas valuable timber species have been eliminated, and tapirs and various primates are no longer found due to excessive hunting. Gold mining contaminates the rivers and intensive commercial fishing adds strain to the aquatic fauna.

In Peru the 20,000 square kilometres (7,700 sq mi) Pacaya-Samiria National Reserve protects a large area in this ecoregion, and the Tambopata National Reserve protects a smaller portion.

== Sources ==
- "Iquitos varzea", Global Species, Myers Enterprises II
- Sears, Robin, Seasonally flooded river basins of Brazil, Peru and Bolivia (NT0128), WWF: World Wildlife Fund
- WildFinder, WWF: World Wildlife Fund
