= Ucayali moist forests =

Ecoregion in Peru

Ucayali moist forests (NT0174)
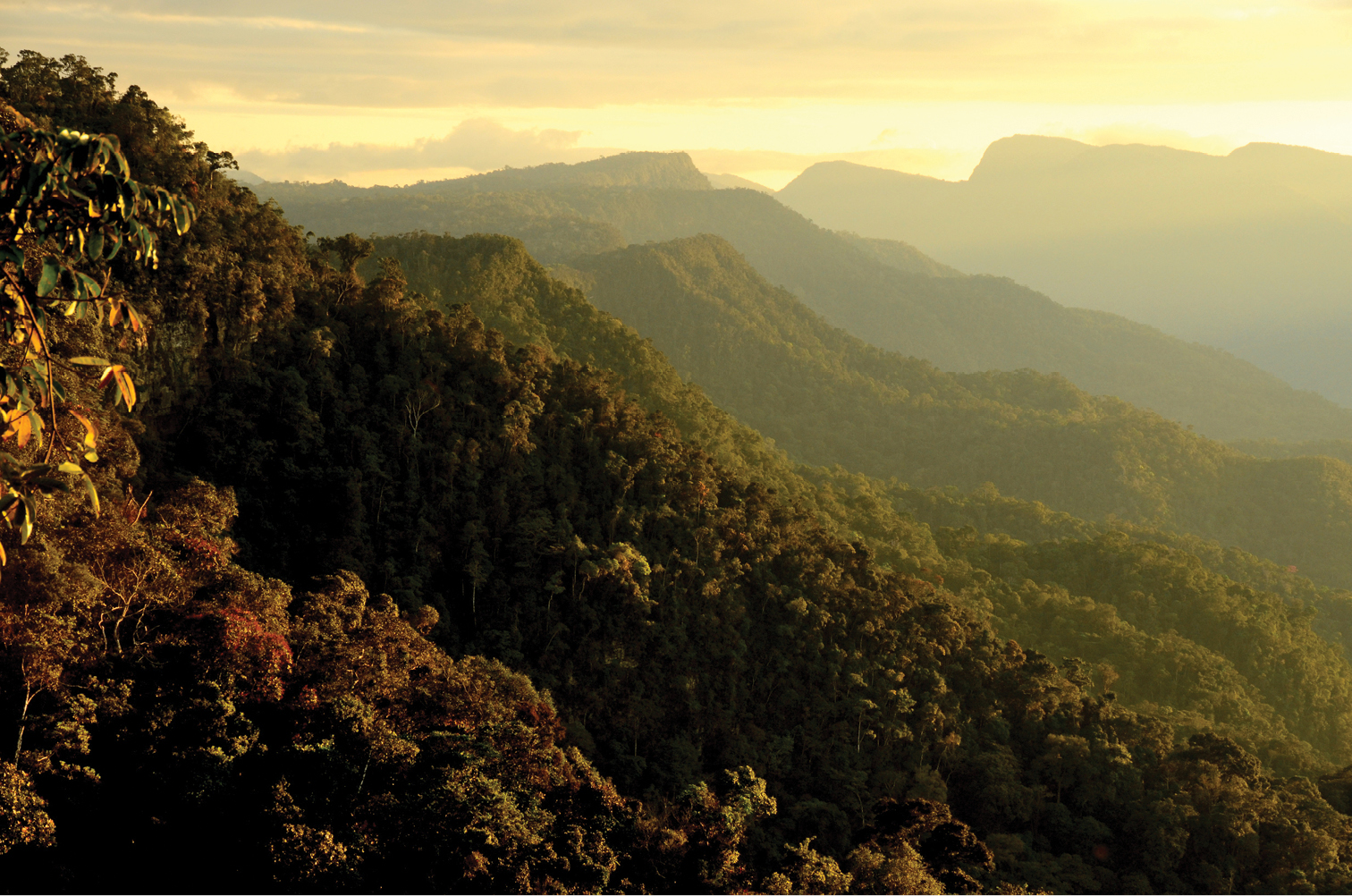
- Montane rainforest on the mountain ridge between Region de San Martin and Region de Loreto

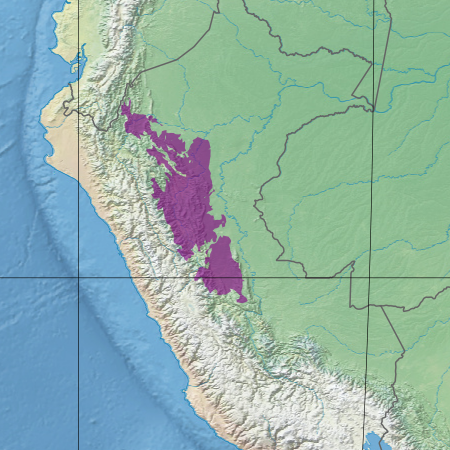
- Ecoregion territory (in purple)

Ecology
- Realm: Neotropical
- Biome: tropical and subtropical moist broadleaf forests
- Bird species: >600
- Mammal species: 188

Geography
- Countries: Peru
- Coordinates: 7.752°S 75.854°W
- Geology: Ucayali Basin
- Rivers: Marañon, Ucayali
- Climate type: Af: equatorial, fully humid

The Ucayali moist forests (NT0174) is an ecoregion in the western Amazon rainforest of Peru.

== Geography ==
=== Location ===
The Ucayali moist forest ecoregion is to the east of the Andes mountains in Peru. It is bounded to the east by the Ucayali River, a major tributary of the Amazon River. To the north it is bounded by the Marañón River.

In the extreme northwest the Ucayali moist forests transition into the Eastern Cordillera Real montane forests. Across the Marañón River valley they transition into the Marañón dry forests, then along most of their western and southern boundary they transition into the Peruvian Yungas. To the east they are separated from the Southwest Amazon moist forests by a belt of Iquitos várzea along the Ucayali River, and to the north they are separated from the Napo moist forests by a belt of Iquitos varzea along the Marañón River.

=== Terrain ===
The sub-Andean terrain is generally flat, but is divided by the Cordillera Oriental, highlands that run along the length of the ecoregion. Elevations are 200 to 1,100 metres (660 to 3,610 ft) above sea level. Many rivers and streams flow from the mountains to the west into the upper Amazon basin.

=== Climate ===
Annual rainfall is 600–2,500 millimetres (24–98 in). At a sample location at 7.75°S 75.75°W the Köppen climate classification is "Af": equatorial, fully humid. Mean temperatures range from 24.7 °C (76.5 °F) in July to 26.1 °C (79.0 °F) in November. Yearly total rainfall is about 1,700 millimetres (67 in). Monthly rainfall ranges from 62.4 millimetres (2.46 in) in August to 205.9 millimetres (8.11 in) in March.

== Ecology ==
The ecoregion is in the Neotropical realm, in the tropical and subtropical moist broadleaf forests biome.

=== Flora ===
Forests are transitional between wet lowland rainforest to the east and premontane moist forests higher up. The ecoregion has diverse flora, with many species of palm. Tropical hardwood species include mahogany, tropical cedar and kapok.

=== Fauna ===
188 species of mammals have been recorded. There are over 600 species of birds. There are also large populations of many species of invertebrates, amphibians and reptiles.

Endangered mammals include white-bellied spider monkey (Ateles belzebuth), Peruvian spider monkey (Ateles chamek), Rio Mayo titi (Callicebus oenanthe) and giant otter (Pteronura brasiliensis). Endangered amphibians include Silverstone's poison frog (Ameerega silverstonei) and Johnson's horned treefrog (Hemiphractus johnsoni).

== Status ==
The World Wildlife Fund gives the ecoregion the status of "Vulnerable". The Cordillera Azul National Park protects part of the ecoregion.
