= Caquetá moist forests =

Ecoregion in the Amazon biome

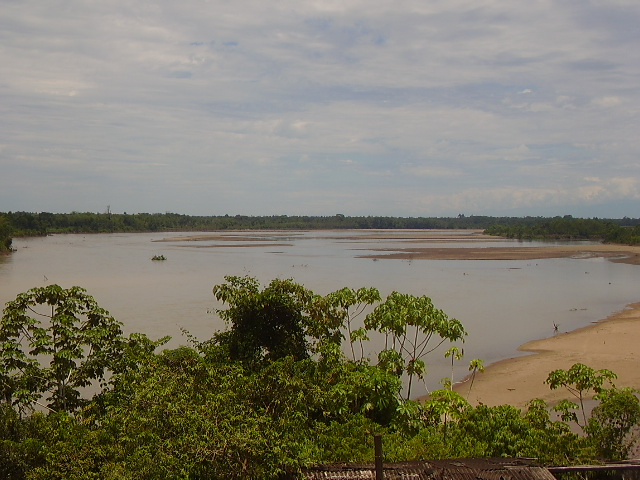
- Caquetá River

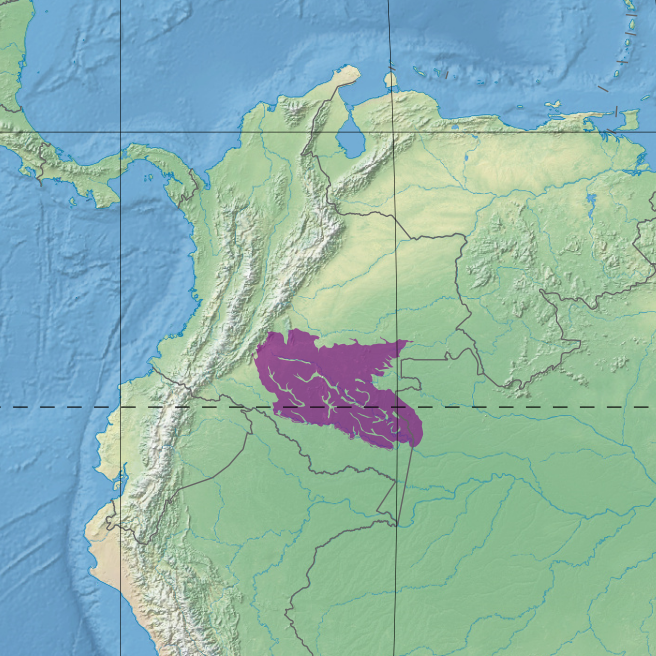
- Ecoregion in purple

Ecology
- Realm: Neotropical
- Biome: Tropical and subtropical moist broadleaf forests – Amazon

Geography
- Area: 184,100 km^{2} (71,100 sq mi)
- Countries: Colombia; Brazil
- Coordinates: 0.1486°N 71.517°W
- Geology: Caguán-Putumayo Basin

The Caquetá moist forests (NT0107) is an ecoregion of tropical moist broad leaf forest to the east of the Andes in the east of Colombia, with a small section in Brazil, in the Amazon biome. The forests are in the transition between the Guiana and Amazon regions, and have highly diverse flora and fauna. They are relatively intact, although they are mostly unprotected and are threatened with deforestation to create cattle pastures.

== Location ==
The Caquetá moist forests, mainly in Colombia, are in the foothills of the Andes. They have an area of 184,100 square kilometres (71,100 sq mi). They are in a region where many rivers flow from the Andes to the Amazon basin. Average annual temperatures range from 20 to 32 °C (68 to 90 °F) depending on elevation and forest coverage. The region has some of the highest rainfall in the Amazon region, with an average of 3,000 millimetres (120 in), and as much as 4,000 millimetres (160 in) in some years.

On the northeast the forest is bounded by the Guainía (Rio Negro), Guaviare, and Guayabero rivers. In the west it is bounded by the Andes. In the south it is bounded by the Caguán River and then the Caquetá (Japurá) River. The forest is crossed by the Apaporis, Vaupés and Yarí rivers. The ecoregion adjoins the Napo moist forests to the west, the Solimões–Japurá moist forests to the south, the Japurá–Solimões–Negro moist forests to the east, the Negro–Branco moist forests and the Llanos grasslands to the north, and the Cordillera Oriental montane forests to the northwest.

Geologically the ecoregion lies in the ancient Guiana Shield, but because of its low elevation and long periods of sedimentation the flora are closer to the Amazon basin than the Guiana region. Most of the region is 100 to 300 metres (330 to 980 ft) in elevation. The forest contains the Caquetá River's alluvial plains, their upland terraces, a sedimentary plain from the Tertiary and sandstone table mountains from the Paleozoic that rise to elevations of over 800 metres (2,600 ft). Some soils are rich in nutrients and others are poor.

== Flora ==
The Caquetá moist forests are in the tropical and subtropical moist broadleaf forests biome of the neotropical realm. The ecoregion is in the transitional area between the Amazon Basin and Guayana forests, and has diverse flora. They are part of the Río Negro–Juruá Moist Forests, a global ecoregion, the other parts being the Negro–Branco, Solimões–Japurá and Japurá-Solimoes-Negro moist forests. The reasonably intact global ecoregion has high annual rainfall, diverse soils and varied terrain, resulting in a high level of biodiversity. It has not been studied in great depth by scientists. The forests contain large areas of seasonally flooded forests, including blackwater igapó forests.

The lower areas have high forest with a 24 metres (79 ft) canopy on well-drained soils, low forest with a 10 metres (33 ft) canopy on poorly drained soils and permanent swamp forests dominated by palms such as Mauritia flexuosa, with a height of 18 metres (59 ft). The high forest and low forest both have highly diverse flora. Basal areas of trees range from 32 square metres per hectare (140 sq ft/acre) in the high forest to 17 square metres per hectare (74 sq ft/acre) in the low forest and 27 square metres per hectare (120 sq ft/acre) per hectare in the permanent swamps. In the forests on poor soils, including the igapó forests which are seasonally flooded with blackwater, there is a sparser understory and fewer epiphytes on the trees. The main families of trees are the Leguminosae, Sapotaceae, Lauraceae, Chrysobalanaceae, Moraceae and Lecythidaceae.

The Sierra de Chiribiquete is in the center of the region between the Apaporis and Yari rivers, with a maximum elevation of 840 metres (2,760 ft). It has areas of savanna, xeromorphic open vegetation up to 5 metres (16 ft) high, low forest of 7 to 8 metres (23 to 26 ft) and closed-canopy forest with a canopy of 15 to 22 metres (49 to 72 ft).

== Fauna ==
There is diverse fauna, but relatively few endemic species. Some endemic species are Chiribiquete emerald (Chlorostilbon olivaresi), grey-legged tinamou (Crypturellus duidae) and mottle-faced tamarin (Saguinus inustus). There are 189 species of mammals including tapir (Tapirus terrestris), collared peccary (Tayassu tajacu) and white-lipped peccary (Tayassu pecari). There are 13 primate species including Spix's night monkey (Aotus vociferans) and white-faced saki (Pithecia monachus). Other species include the golden-mantled tamarin (Saguinus tripartitus), jaguar (Panthera onca) and spectral bat (Vampyrum spectrum).

Reptiles and amphibians include the yellow-footed tortoise (Chelonoidis denticulata), green iguana (Iguana iguana) and tegus lizards (Tupinambis species). The Caqueta moist forests are known for snakes such as emerald tree boa (Corallus caninus), fer-de-lance (Bothrops asper), palm vipers (Bothriechis species), common green racer (Chlorosoma viridissimum), coral snakes (Micrurus species), boa constrictors (Boa constrictor) and bushmasters (Lachesis muta).

469 birds species have been recorded, including the endemic Chiribiquete emerald (Chlorostilbon olivaresi) and grey-legged tinamou (Crypturellus duidae). Other birds include the plain-winged antwren (Myrmotherula behni), dusky spinetail (Synallaxis moesta), lemon-throated barbet (Eubucco richardsoni) and zone-tailed hawk (Buteo albonotatus).

== Threats ==
The forest is fairly intact and stable, although the 8,550 square kilometres (3,300 sq mi) Nukak National Natural Reserve is the only protected area in the region. There are small settlements of indigenous people in the interior of the forest, but they have little environmental impact. The greatest threat to the ecoregion comes from logging to create pastures for large-scale cattle grazing. Large areas have been cleared to create cattle pasture at the headwaters of the Vaupés River. Colonists are moving down the Rio Negro clearing forest for small scale agriculture or cattle raising. Large areas of forest along the Vaupés and Apaporis rivers are being replaced by coca (Erythroxylum coca). During the period from 2004 to 2011 the ecoregion experienced an annual rate of habitat loss of 0.16%.
