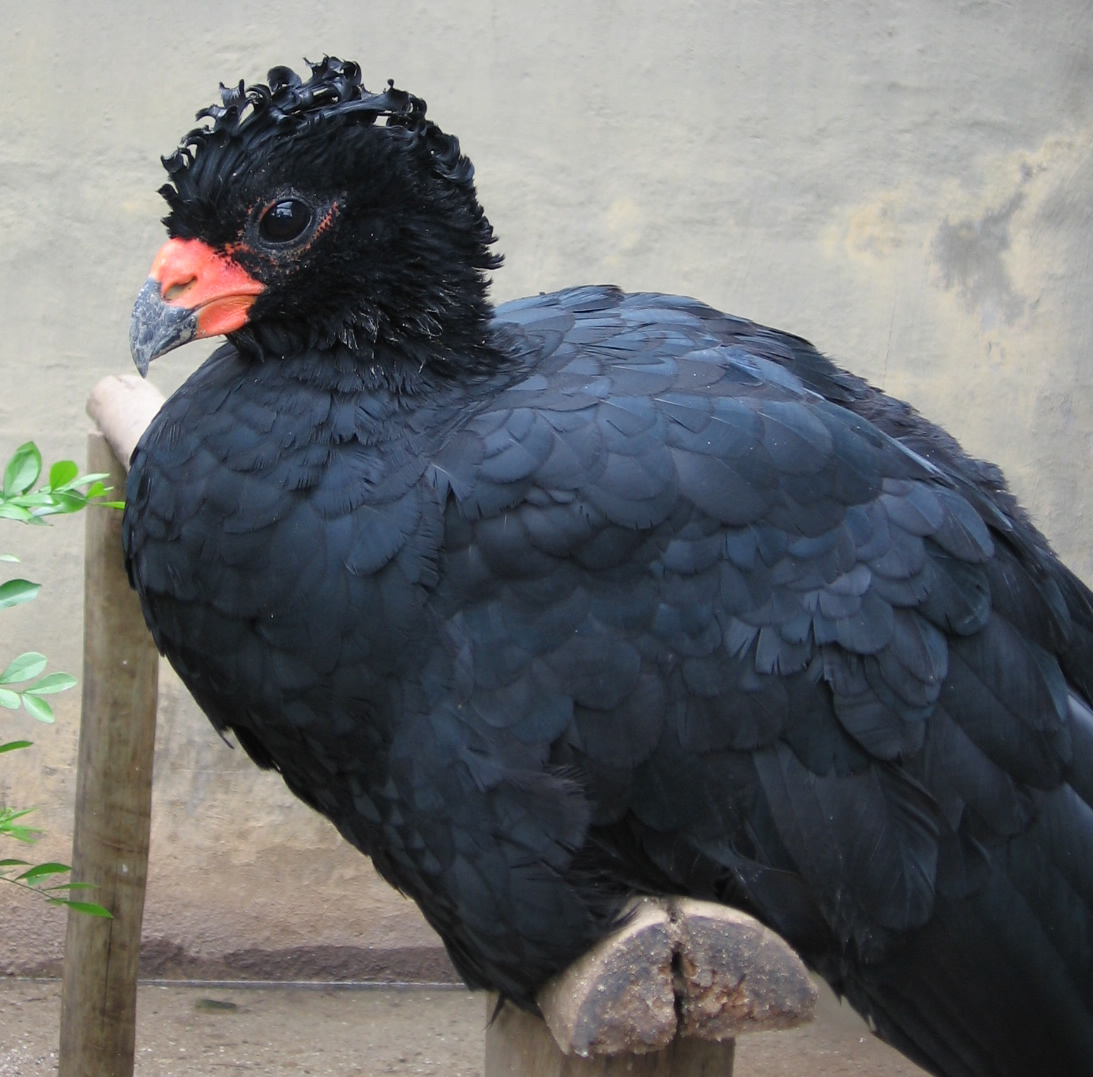
- Male at Rio de Janeiro Zoological Garden
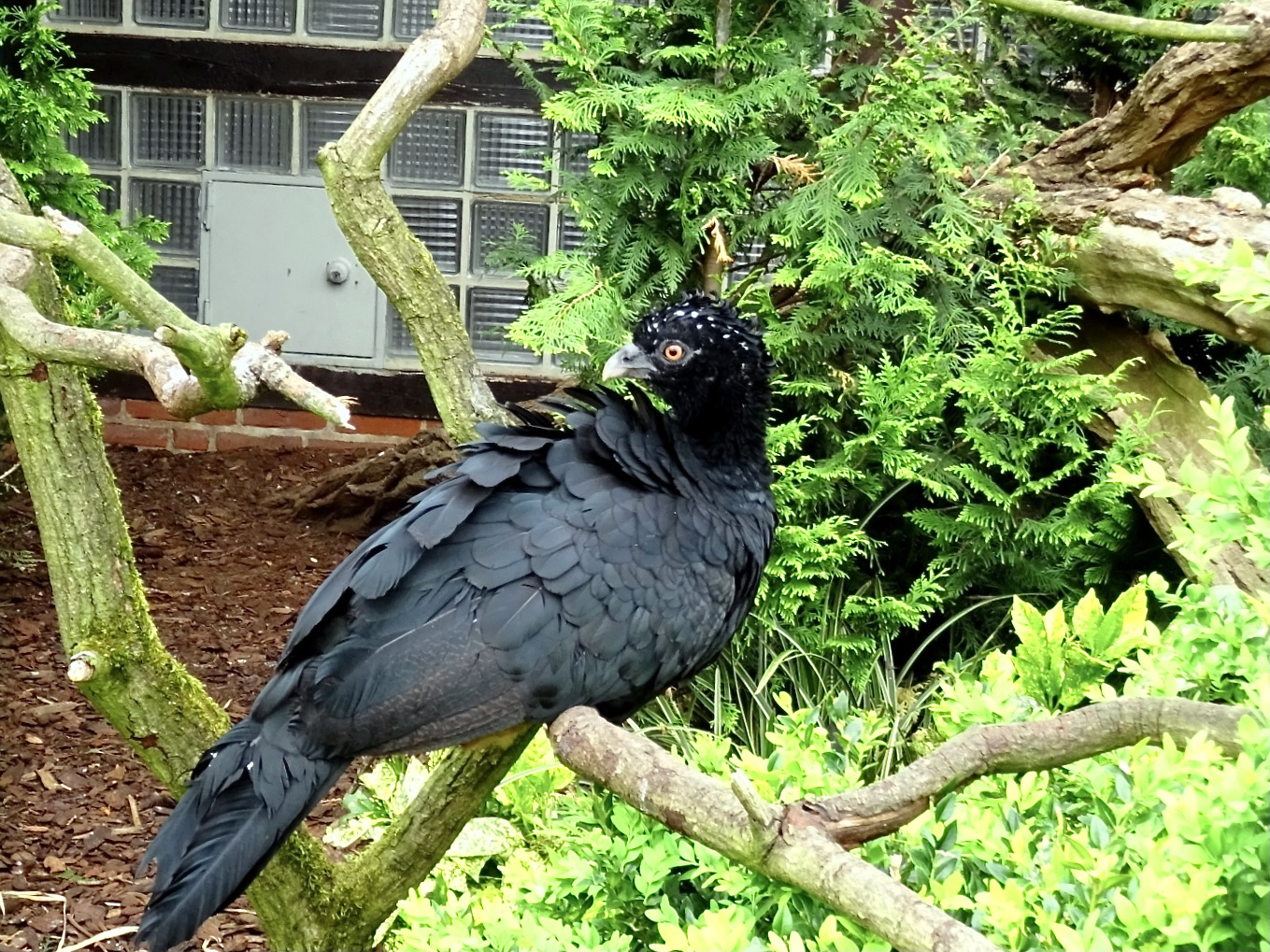
- Female at Weltvogelpark Walsrode

Conservation status
- Endangered (IUCN 3.1)
- CITES Appendix I

Scientific classification
- Kingdom: Animalia
- Phylum: Chordata
- Class: Aves
- Order: Galliformes
- Family: Cracidae
- Genus: Crax
- Species: C. blumenbachii

Binomial name
- Crax blumenbachii Spix, 1825

= Red-billed curassow =

Species of bird

The red-billed curassow or red-knobbed curassow (Crax blumenbachii) is an endangered species of cracid that is endemic to lowland Atlantic Forest in the states of Espírito Santo, Bahia and Minas Gerais in southeastern Brazil. Its population is decreasing due to hunting and deforestation, and it has possibly been extirpated from Minas Gerais. It is currently being reintroduced to Rio de Janeiro by means of individuals bred in captivity. As suggested by its common name, the male has a largely red bill, but this is lacking in the female.

== Description ==
The red-billed curassow is a large bird reaching a length of 82 to 92 centimetres (32 to 36 in). The male has pure black upper parts with a large black crest, and white underparts. There are bright red wattles and knobs at the base of the bill. The male can be distinguished from the wattled curassow (Crax globulosa) by being less bluish-black and from the black curassow (Crax alector) by being less purplish-black. The female lacks the wattles and has black upper parts, a black and white barred crest, reddish-brown wings barred and mottled with black, and reddish-brown or ochre underparts.

== Behaviour ==
The red-billed curassow is a largely ground-dwelling bird. It feeds on seeds, fruits, buds and small invertebrates. Males can be heard issuing their loud "booms" in September and October. Females lay a clutch of one to four eggs and the young are fledged by the end of the year.

== Status ==
The red-billed curassow has a very limited range in eastern Brazil and populations there are declining because of habitat loss and hunting. The virgin forest in which it lives has largely been converted to agricultural land and plantations, and the bird is only present now in reserves, and even here it is illegally hunted and captured for the bird trade. There has been a successful captive breeding programme but the International Union for Conservation of Nature rates its conservation status in the wild as "endangered".
