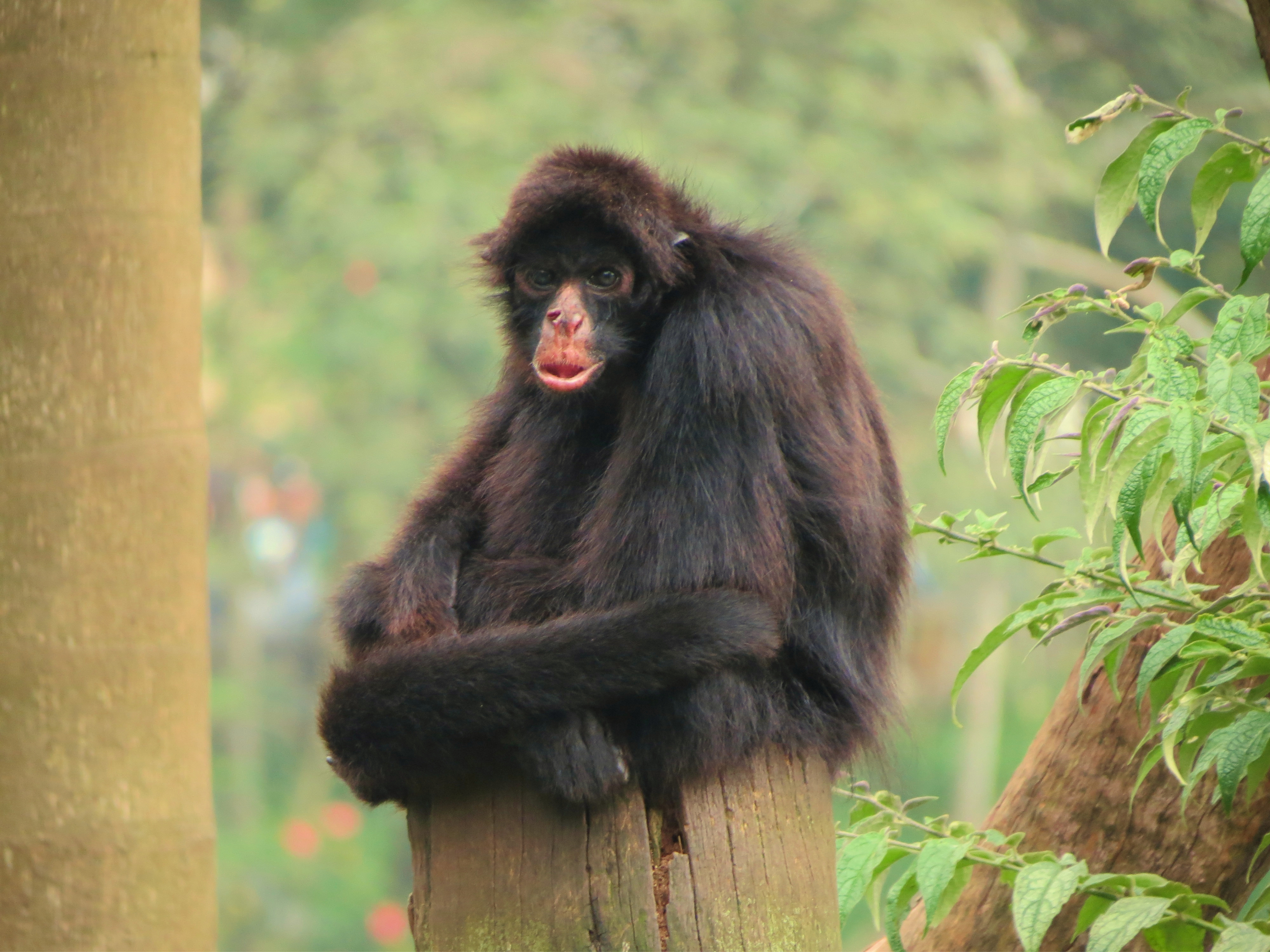

Conservation status
- Endangered (IUCN 3.1)

Scientific classification
- Kingdom: Animalia
- Phylum: Chordata
- Class: Mammalia
- Infraclass: Placentalia
- Order: Primates
- Family: Atelidae
- Genus: Ateles
- Species: A. chamek

Binomial name
- Ateles chamek (Humboldt, 1812)
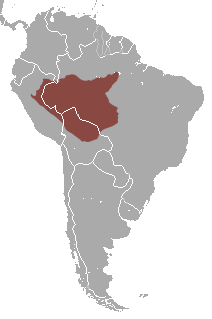
- Peruvian Spider Monkey range

= Peruvian spider monkey =

Species of New World monkey

The Peruvian spider monkey (Ateles chamek), also known as the black-faced black spider monkey, is a species of spider monkey that lives in Peru, as well as in Brazil and in Bolivia. At 60 centimetres (2 feet) long, they are relatively large among species of monkey, and their strong, prehensile tails can be up to 1 m (3 ft) long. Unlike many species of monkey, they have only a vestigial thumb, an adaptation which enables them to travel using brachiation. Peruvian spider monkeys live in groups of 20–30 individuals, but these groups are rarely all together simultaneously. The size and dynamics of the resulting subgroups vary with food availability and sociobehavioral activity. They prefer to eat fleshy fruit, but will change their diet in response to scarcity of ripe fruit. Individuals of this species also eat small animals, insects and leaves based on availability. Females separate from the band to give birth, typically in the fall. These females inhabit a group of core areas where resources are abundant in certain seasons. Typically, males exhibit ranging over longer distances than females, with movement of individuals enhancing the fluidity of subgroup size. Peruvian spider monkey are independent at about 10 months, with a lifespan of about 20 years.

== Characteristics ==
The Peruvian spider monkey weighs up to 9 kilograms (20 pounds). Its body can be 70 cm (28 in) long and the tail can be 1 m (40 in) long. It has four elongated fingers and virtually no thumb, which is typical for spider monkeys but unusual for other monkeys. It can move easily through the trees and it has a prehensile tail like other species in the genus Ateles, which it uses to assist with brachiation. It has an agility that can only be compared to the gibbon of Asia. It has a life span of up to 20 years.

== Distribution ==
The species occurs in central-northern of Bolivia, north-eastern Peru, and the central-western Brazilian Amazon. The species was recently found to occur in the northern bank of Solimões River, at the Mamirauá Reserve, where it probably colonized through a river meander cutoff process. They live primarily in lowland forests, occupying the canopy and the sub-canopy, but they have been observed using various habitat types, including dry and hilly areas such as the piedmont and cerrado forests, and have been observed to move depending on food availability. They were also observed living in Amazonian seasonally flooded forests. They live in territorial bands of 6–12 individuals whose territory covers about 20 square kilometers. Band size is somewhat seasonal, probably because females separate themselves from the band for a few months to give birth, primarily in the fall. It has to contest with other spider monkeys, woolly monkeys, and howler monkeys for food and territory.

== Food ==
The Peruvian spider monkey feeds on leaves, berries, small animals such as birds and frogs, flowers, termites, honey, grubs, and fruits. It is primarily frugivorous with a tendency to exhibit folivory in times of fruit scarcity. It will also eat insects, baby birds, bird eggs, and frogs. In the Amazon, groups of Peruvian spider monkeys show strong seasonal variations in habitat based on the availability of fleshy fruits. The foraging habits of this species causes the monkeys to be a vital component of seed dispersal patterns for many tree species in Amazonia.

== Growth and reproduction ==
The spider monkey has a reproductive period that can span throughout the year, though most offspring are born at the start of the Autumn season. It has a gestation period of about 140 days. The pregnant female leaves the group to have her baby and returns 2–4 months later. The newborn spider monkey is independent at about 10 months.

== Conservation status ==
This species of spider monkey, in addition to other species within the genus Ateles, is threatened due to exploitation by humans and habitat loss. It is currently listed on the IUCN Red List of Threatened Species as Endangered and is listed in Appendix II of CITES despite having been listed as a species of "Least concern" in 2003. The IUCN experts claim that the number of individuals has declined by at least 50% over the past 45 years. Researchers suggest that the species may effectively occupy only 28% of its entire range, and that only 32% of the species' area of occupancy is legally protected. They also suggests that 31–40% of the species' habitat will be lost by 2050. This decline is partially due to the fact that these monkeys are targeted by hunters for sale and consumption in the Amazonian bushmeat trade. Furthermore, habitat in the southern part of its range is being developed for agriculture and habitat in the southwestern Peruvian region of Madre de Dios is being polluted and destroyed by illegal mining activity. In Peru, illicit extraction of timber and wildlife products remain issues even in protected areas. Studies show that in heavily hunted and farmed areas, large-bodied primate species such as spider monkeys are likely to be some of the first species to be extirpated. Reintroduction efforts by researchers at Reserva Ecologica Taricaya have begun along the lower Madre de Dios river where conservation efforts now provide a suitable release site and protected habitat.

== Similar or related species ==
In addition to external appearance, the Peruvian spider monkey differs from the red-faced spider monkey by the number of chromosomes (2n = 32 in the red-faced vs. 2n = 34 in the Peruvian) in addition to several specific chromosomal differences. The two species have been interbred in captivity, resulting in offspring with reduced fertility (but not sterility). There are several related species such as the Central American spider monkey or Geoffroy's spider monkey (A. geoffroyi), and the brown spider monkey (A. hybridus) and the species' closest relative the white-bellied spider monkey (A. belzebuth). All of these have a prehensile tail, a thumbless hand, and other characteristics that are found in all spider monkeys.
