= Reserva Ecologica Taricaya =

Protected area of Peru

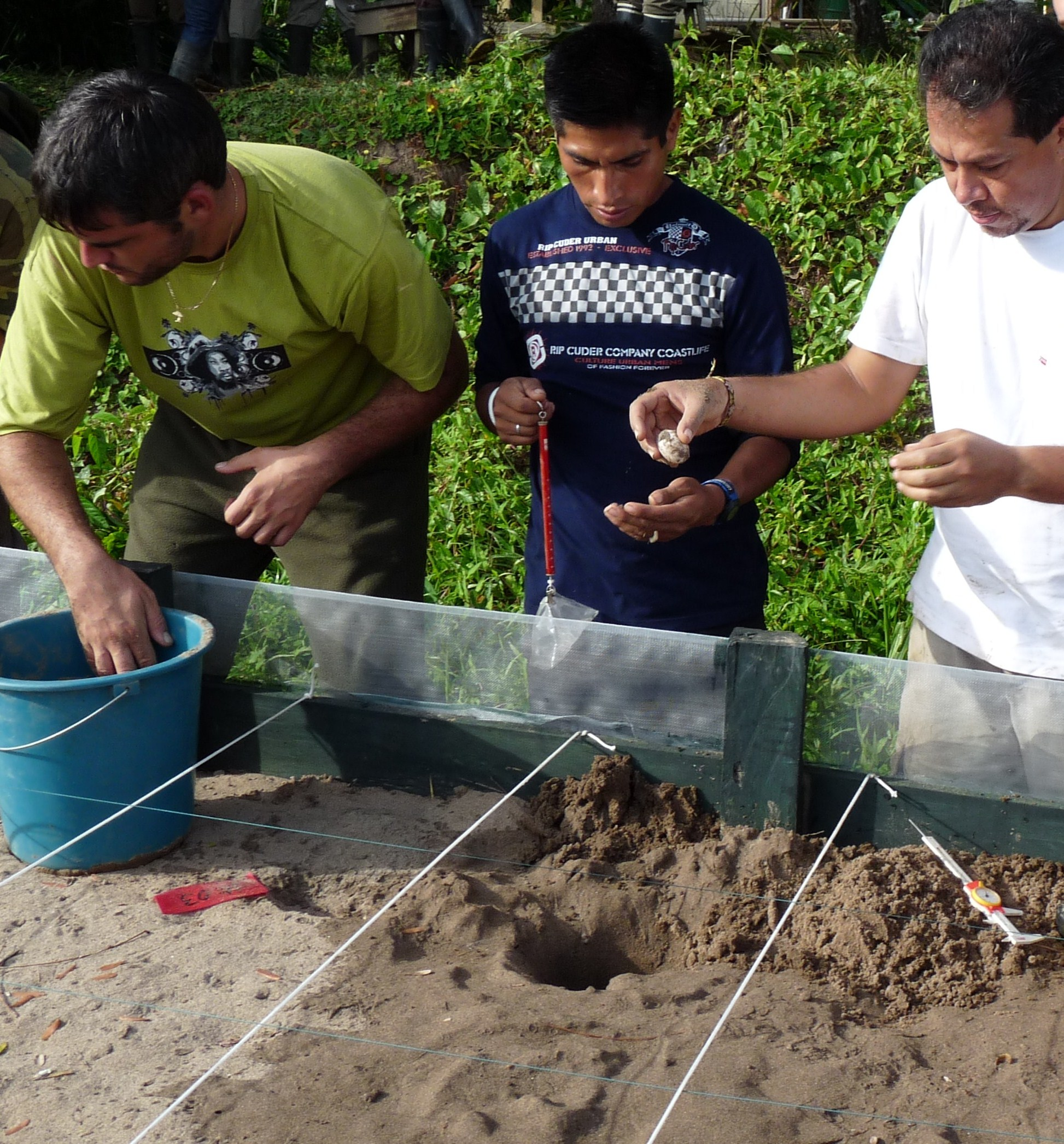
Volunteers at Reserva Ecologica Taricaya

Reserva Ecologica Taricaya is a private nature reserve located in the Peruvian Amazon along the Madre de Dios River, a major tributary to the Amazon River. Since 2004, it has been under the ownership of Projects Abroad, a for-profit company based in Great Britain with volunteer programs in over 20 countries. Puerto Maldonado, the nearest city and capital of the Madre de Dios department of Peru, is located approximately one hour away by boat ride. The reserve was founded by Oxford biologist Stuart Timson.
