= Morona River =

River in Ecuador and Peru

Location
- Countries: Ecuador; Peru

Physical characteristics
- Source
  - elevation: 1,125 m (3,691 ft)
- Mouth: Marañón River
  - coordinates: 4°44′S 77°4′W
  - elevation: 129 m (423 ft)
- Length: 663.91 km (412.53 mi) 550 km (340 mi)
- Basin size: 16,961.9 km^{2} (6,549.0 sq mi)
- Discharge
  - location: Near mouth
  - average: (Period: 1965–2013)1,106.96 m^{3}/s (39,092 cu ft/s)

Basin features
- Progression: Marañón → Amazon → Atlantic Ocean
- River system: Amazon

The Morona River is a tributary to the Marañón River in Peru and Ecuador, and flows parallel to the Pastaza River and immediately to the west of it, and is the last stream of any importance on the northern side of the Amazon before reaching the Pongo de Manseriche.

It is formed from a multitude of water-courses which descend the slopes of the Ecuadorian Andes south of the gigantic volcano of Sangay; but it soon reaches the plain, which commences where it receives its Cusulima branch. The Morona is navigable for small craft for about 300 miles above its mouth, but it is extremely tortuous. Canoes may ascend many of its branches, especially the Cusuhma and the Miazal, the latter almost to the base of Sangay. The Morona has been the scene of many rude explorations, with the hope of finding it serviceable as a commercial route between the inter-Andean tableland of Ecuador and the Amazon river.

In 2016, a large oil spill from Petroperú's pipeline contaminated the Morona and Chiriaco rivers.
