= Caguán River =

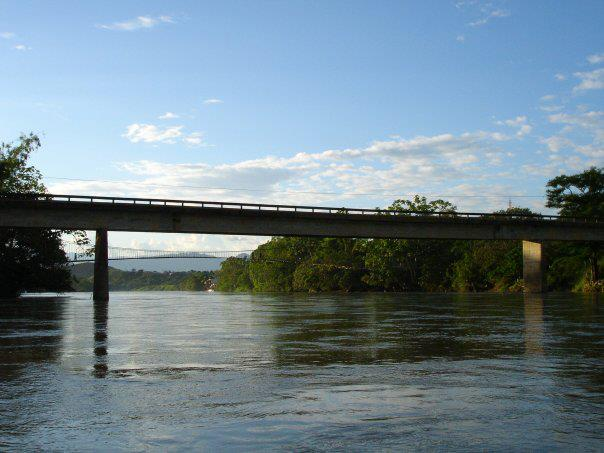
- The river near San Vicente del Caguán

- Mouth location in Colombia
- Native name: Río Caguán (Portuguese)

Location
- Country: Colombia

Physical characteristics
- Mouth
  - coordinates: 0°08′07″S 74°17′20″W
- Length: 470

Basin features
- River system: Caquetá River

The Caguán River (Spanish: Río Caguán, Spanish pronunciation: [kaˈɣwan]) is a river of Colombia. It is a tributary of the Caquetá River in the Amazon River basin.

It defines the eastern boundary of the Napo moist forests ecoregion.

== See also ==
- List of rivers of Colombia
