= Salix martiana =

Scientific classification
- Kingdom: Plantae
- Clade: Tracheophytes
- Clade: Angiosperms
- Clade: Eudicots
- Clade: Rosids
- Order: Malpighiales
- Family: Salicaceae
- Genus: Salix
- Species: S. martiana

Binomial name
- Salix martiana Leyb.

Species of willow

Salix martiana is a neotropical willow. It is the only consistently hermaphroditic willow species. Single individuals exhibit catkins composed of female, hermaphrodite and male flowers. The tree typically grows along the edge of tropical rivers and in whitewater floodplains of the Amazon basin. This habitat is highly unstable, with annual floods often stripping vegetation from riverine shorelines. This may account for the singular hermaphrodite pattern of flowers of the tree, as this may facilitate self-compatibility for reproduction. The tree is able to maintain its leaves despite lengthy inundation of its roots during flood season. This is in part due to lysigenous aerenchyma of its roots.
