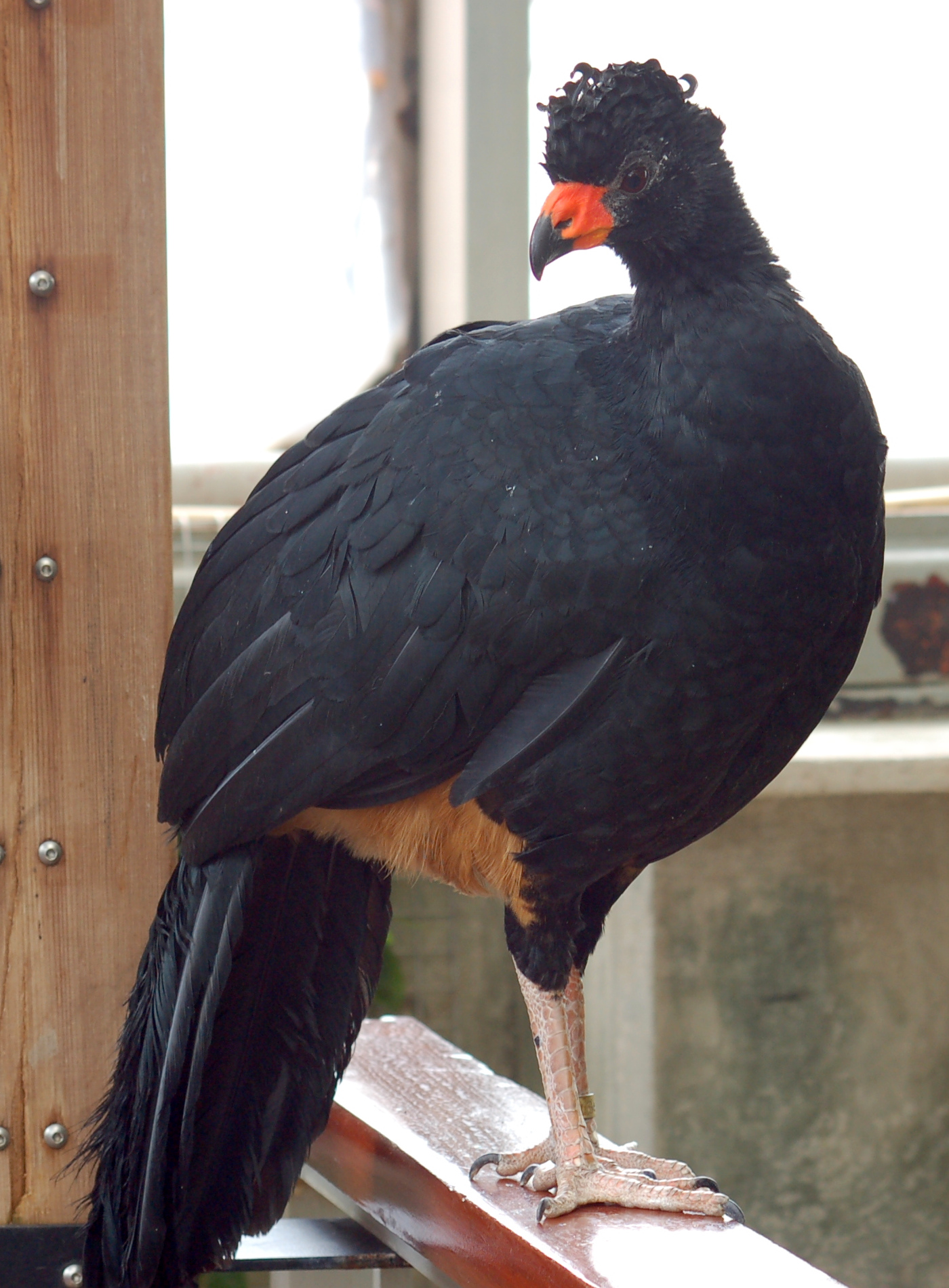
- Female at the National Aviary; Note reddish-buff crissum (the area around the cloaca)

Conservation status
- Endangered (IUCN 3.1)

Scientific classification
- Kingdom: Animalia
- Phylum: Chordata
- Class: Aves
- Order: Galliformes
- Family: Cracidae
- Genus: Crax
- Species: C. globulosa

Binomial name
- Crax globulosa Spix, 1825

Synonyms
- Crax carunculata Crax yarrellii

= Wattled curassow =

Species of bird

The wattled curassow (Crax globulosa) is a threatened member of the family Cracidae, the curassows, guans, and chachalacas. It is found in remote rainforests in the western Amazon basin in South America. Males have black plumage, except for a white crissum (the area around the cloaca), with curly feathers on the head and red bill ornaments and wattles. Females and juveniles are similar but lack the bill ornamentation and have a reddish-buff crissum area. The wattled curassow is sister to other southern Crax curassows. In captivity, it sometimes hybridises with the blue-billed curassow.

The habitat of the wattled curassow is gallery forests and seasonally-flooded forests where it feeds in small groups on the ground. The diet is largely fruit, but invertebrates and some small vertebrates are opportunistically taken. Little is known of its breeding habits, but it is known that the nest is built of sticks and leaves and two eggs are usually laid. The population of this species is declining. It is threatened by loss of habitat, as the rainforest is progressively cleared, and by hunting, and the International Union for Conservation of Nature has rated its conservation status as "endangered".

== Description ==
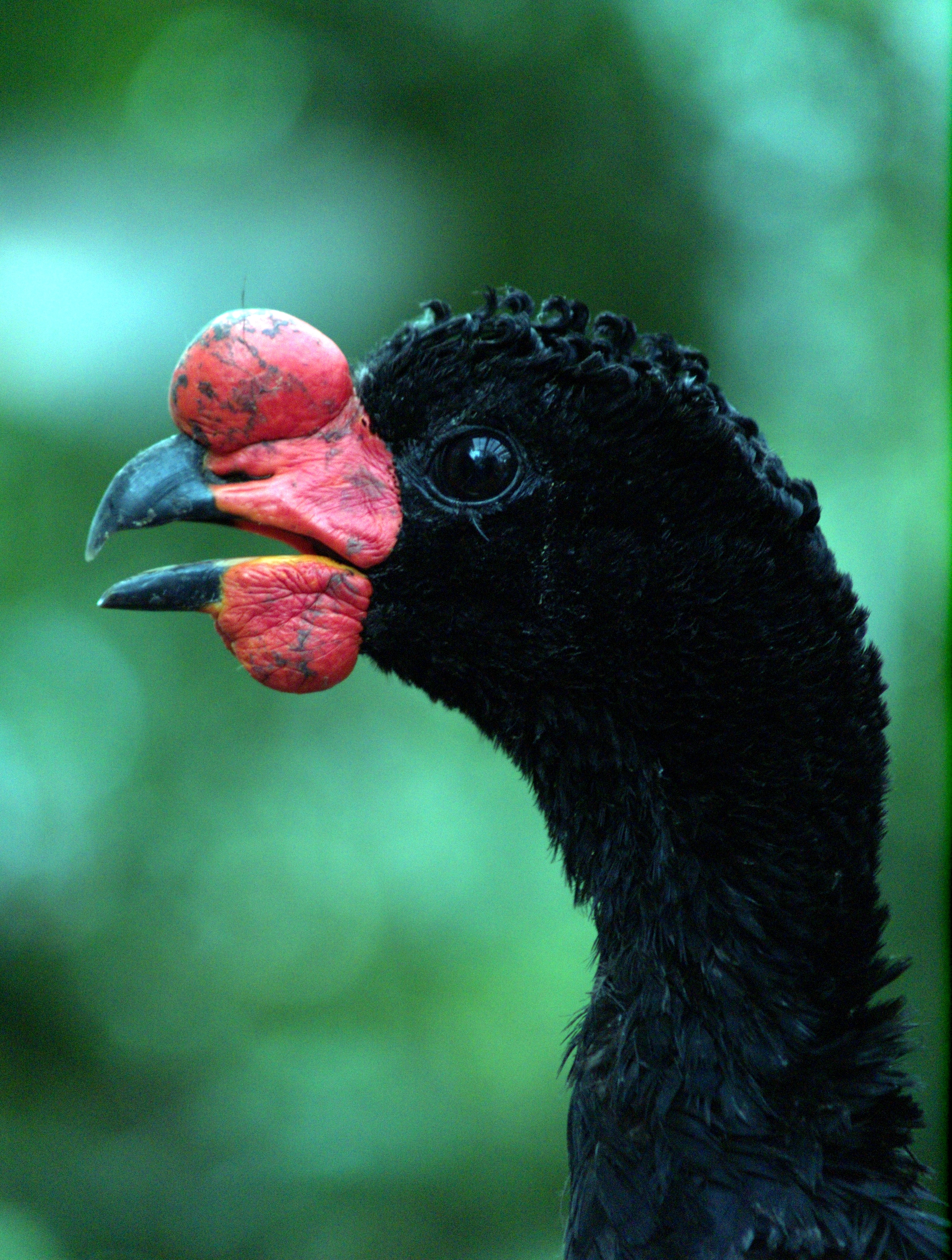
Head and neck of an adult male

The wattled curassow is about 82–89 cm (32–35 in) long, and weighs around 2,500 g (88 oz). It is a large curassow lacking the white tail-tips found in many of these birds; the feathers along the crest of its head are curled forwards. Males have black plumage all over except for the white crissum. The irides are dark brown; legs, feet and bill are blackish. It has conspicuous crimson bill ornaments—a round red knob with bony core adorns the maxilla base, while the cere extends apically at least halfway under this knob and below the mandible base forms a small fleshy wattle.

Females have black plumage just like the male, but their crissal area is reddish buff. In some, the remiges and sometimes the wing coverts have faint brownish marbling. Their bills and irides are also blackish, but their feet and legs are a greyish flesh color. They lack the bill knob and wattles, and their cere is bright orange-red. Young males have less well-developed facial ornaments, usually with a more yellowish hue like females do.

The hatchlings are covered in brown down above and whitish down below.

=== Similar species ===
Adults look very much like those of the red-billed curassow (C. blumenbachii), whose males have only an indistinct maxilla knob. Its females have a blackish cere, rather pale legs and feet, and their wings—particularly the remiges—usually have distinct chestnut brown marbling. The black curassow subspecies C. alector erythrognatha, found north of the Solimões, has a cere like the wattled curassow female, but its bill is lighter and the crissum is white in both sexes. Young C. globulosa males are easily confused with those of the yellow-knobbed curassows (C. daubentoni), but the latter has a white tail-margin and yellow (not orange) bill wattle. All these similar species are allopatric however, with only C. a. erythrognatha occurring adjacent to the range of C. globulosa.

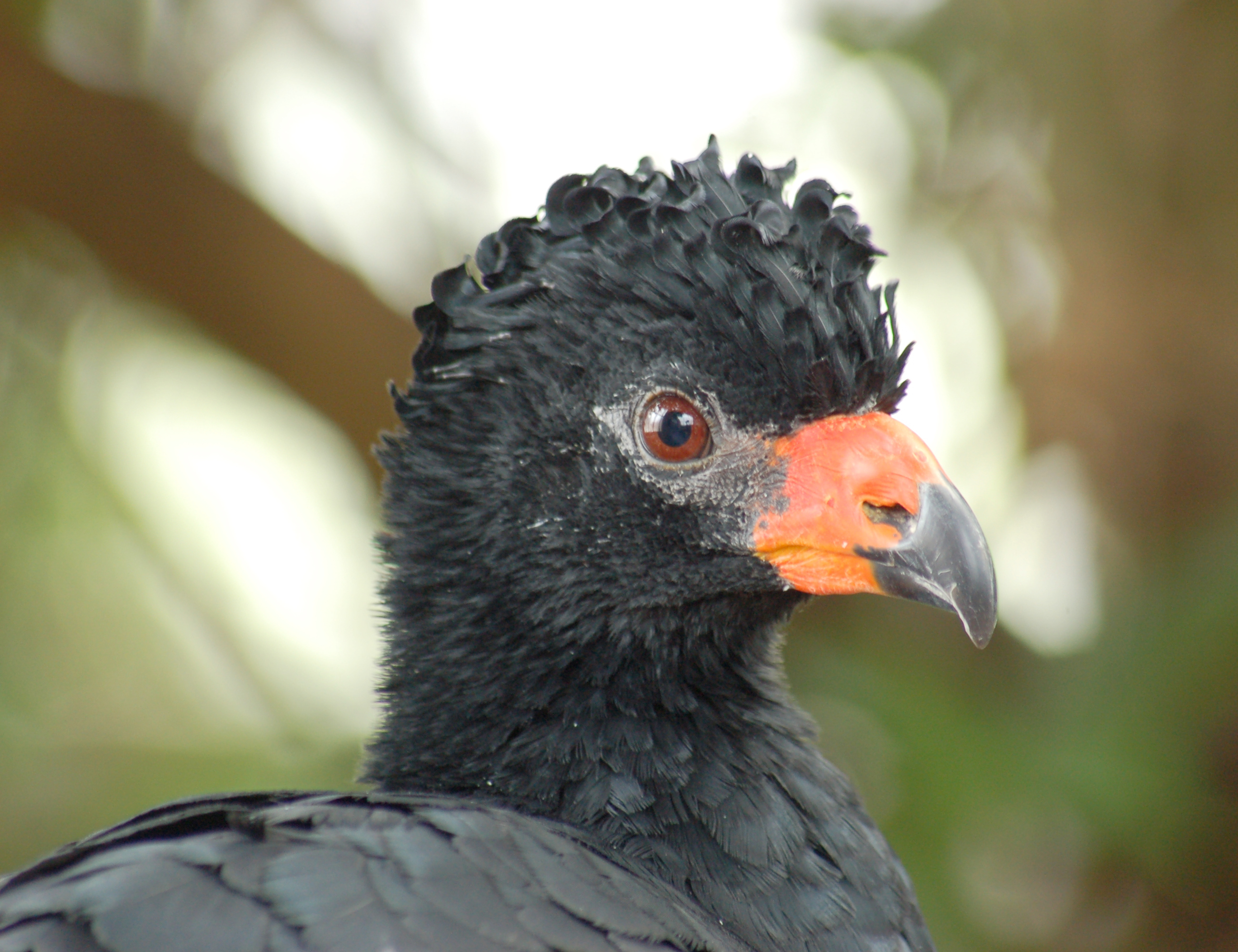
Wattled curassow female
Note dark bill and orange cere

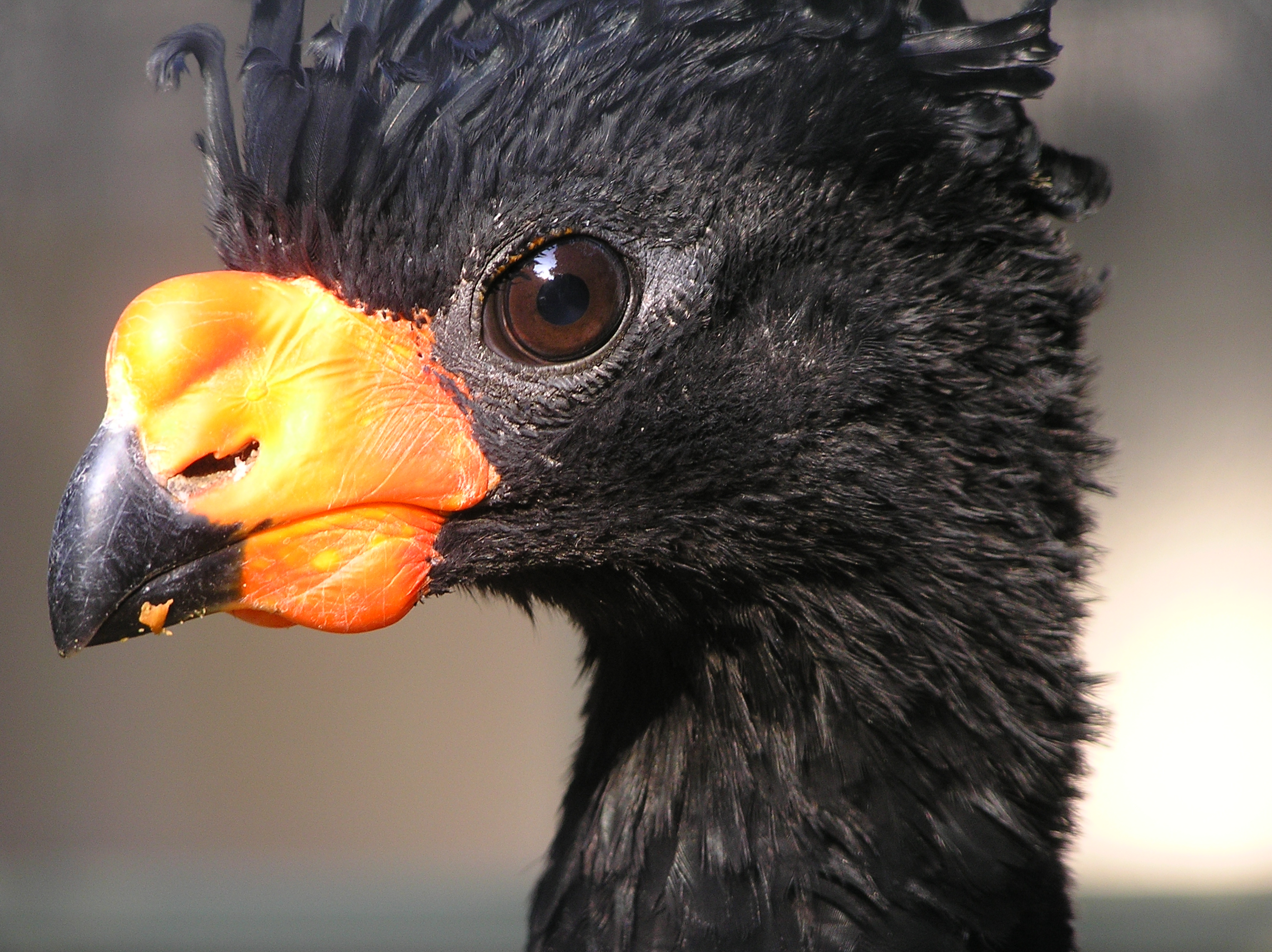
A young male wattled curassow.

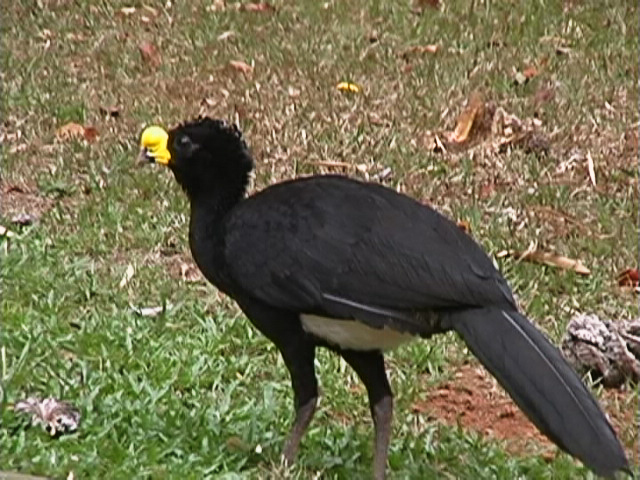
Male great curassow (C. rubra)

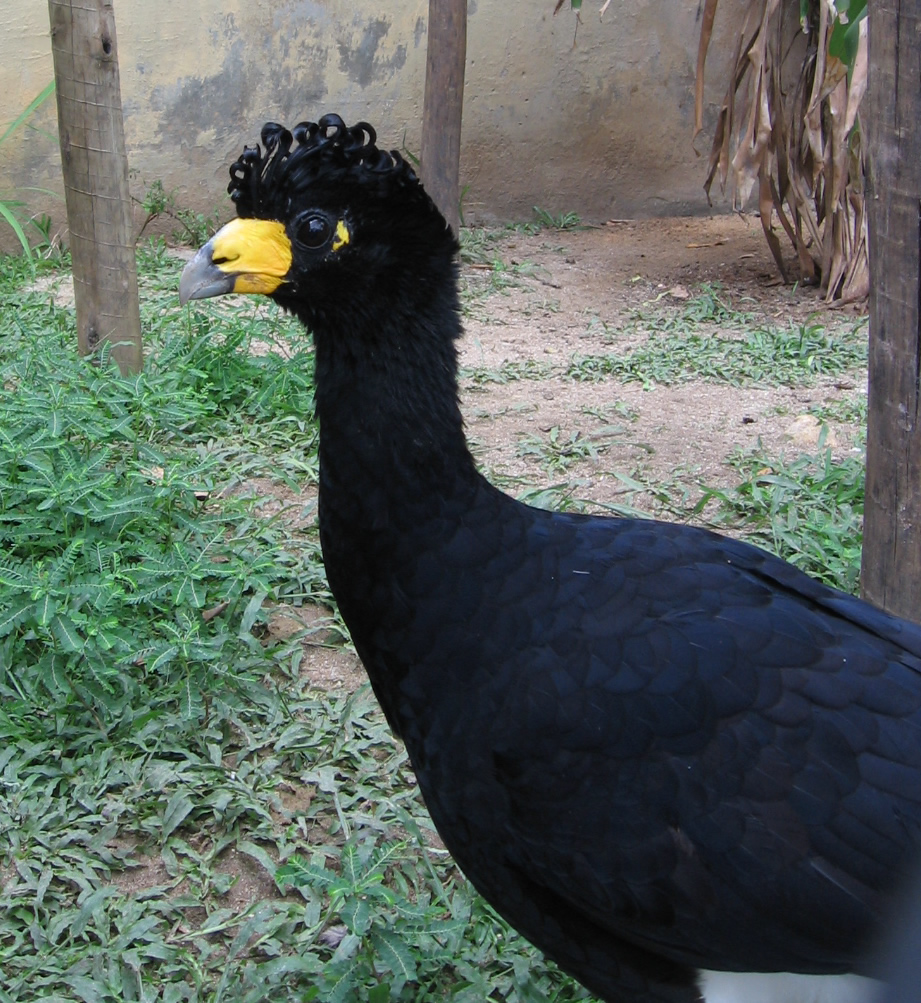
Eastern black curassow (C. a. alector)
Note light bill. Cere is orange-red in western subspecies.

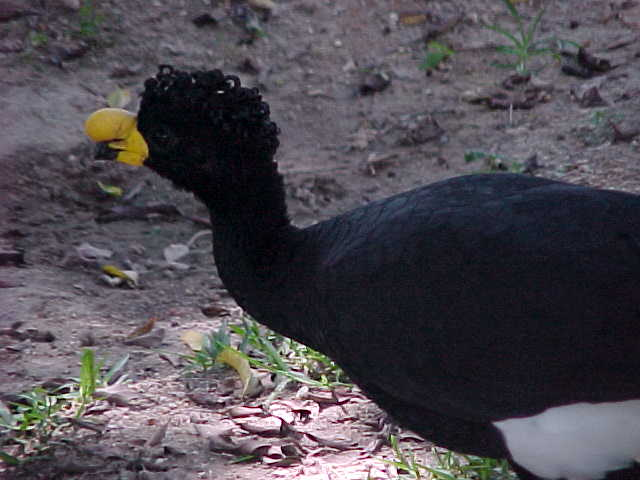
Adult male yellow-knobbed curassow (C. daubentoni)

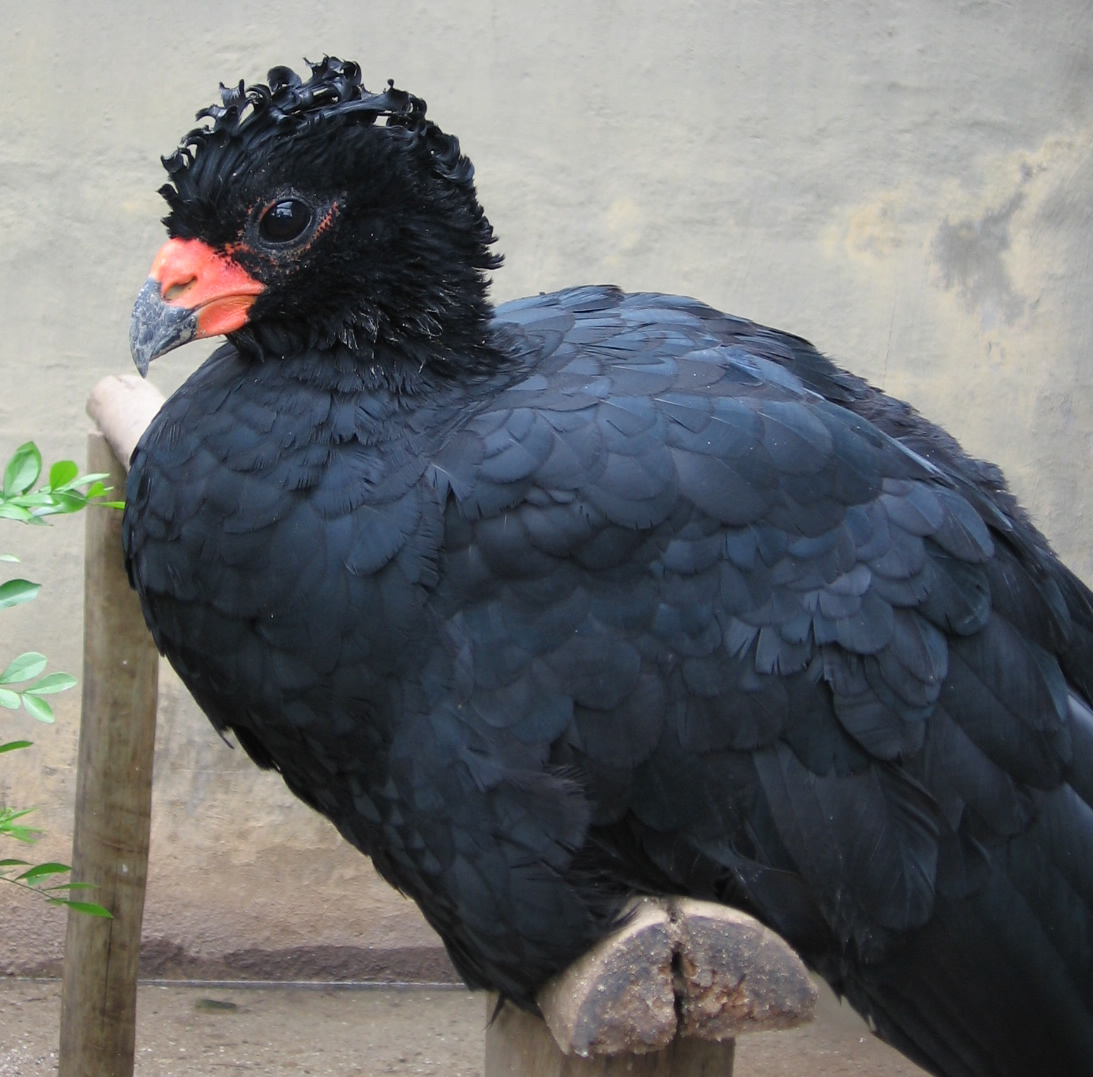
Adult male red-billed curassow (C. blumenbachii).
Note crimson cere and lack of pronounced bill knob.

== Taxonomy and systematics ==
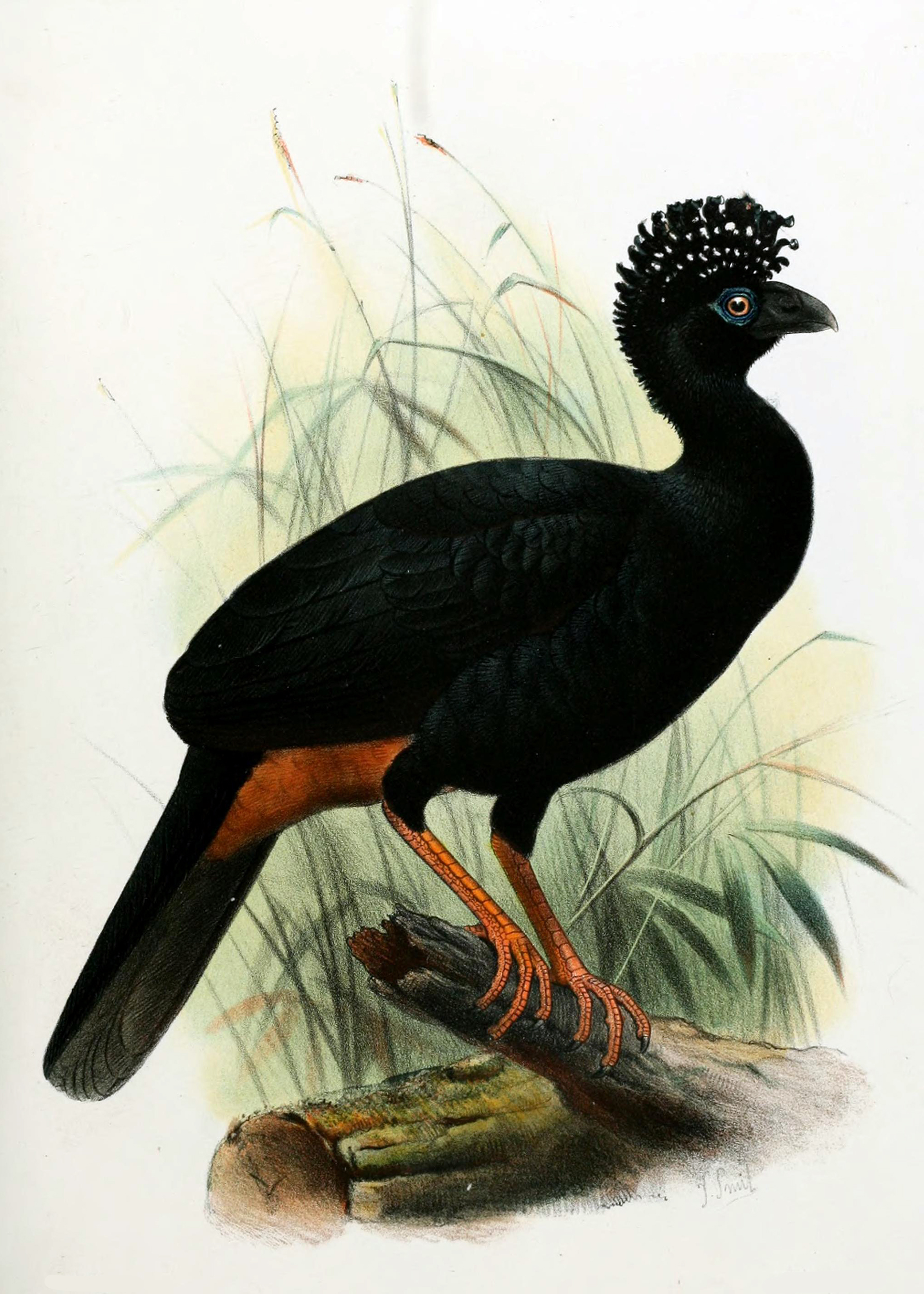
Wattled curassow by J. Smit

The wattled curassow is one of the Crax species described in 1825 by Johann Baptist von Spix; the type locality is the Solimões (middle Amazon River) region. Crax is a term for curassows introduced by Mathurin Jacques Brisson in his 1760s Ornithologia and adopted by Linnaeus as a genus name in the Systema naturae. The specific name globulosa indicates the possession of one or more prominent round surface features (from Latin globus "a globe"). It has no recognized subspecies.

According to cladistic analysis of multisequence mtDNA data, the wattled curassow is sister to other southern Crax curassows. Its origins date back some 6–5.5 mya ago (Messinian, Late Miocene) when its ancestors became isolated in the western Amazon rainforest. Some molecular phylogenetic analyses indicate a sister relationship with the red-billed curassow (C. blumenbachii), while others suggest that it is sister to a clade composed of C. blumenbachii, C. fasciolata, and C. alector. The similarity with the red-billed curassow seems to be mostly due to the fact that they have retained more plesiomorphic characters. Though externally still fairly alike, the two species have vastly different calls and probably evolved, at about the same time, at opposite ends of the original southern Crax curassow's range.

From captivity, hybrids with the blue-billed curassow (Crax alberti) are known; the wattled curassow has also hybridized with black curassow (Crax alector) and bare-faced curassow (Crax fasciola). The yellow-knobbed curassow (C. daubentoni) is probably the most closely related to wattled curassow. But viable (though not dependably fertile) hybrids are suspected to be possible between any two species of Cracidae. The color and shape of the bill ornaments of male Crax hybrids are not easily predicted, but character displacement would demand the eastern (if any) subspecies of the black curassow (C. a. alector) to have a red ornamentation, as no red-ornamented congeners occur in or near its range. The red cere of the western black curassow may well be due to occasional hybrid introgression of C. globulosa alleles, as it is unlikely that the Solimões is entirely impassable to these birds.

== Distribution ==
It has been found from the western and southwestern Amazon Basin of Brazil west to the Andes foothills of southeastern Colombia, eastern Ecuador and Peru, and northern Bolivia. Its area of occurrence is essentially delimited by the Caquetá-Japurá, Solimões, Amazon and Madeira Rivers, and the 300 meter contour line towards the Andes. But its precise distribution is very little-known; most populations were observed by people travelling along the rivers in its range.

Most of the northern limit of its range runs along the middle Amazon River, or Solimões. In northern Peru where the Marañón River becomes the Amazon River (Solimões for Brazilians), close to Nauta, the range continues upstream towards eastern Amazonian Ecuador along the Caquetá-Japurá; it has been recorded from the Yavarí and middle Napo Rivers. It is probably not found anymore in Ecuador proper, and apart from two small populations—Isla Mocagua in the Amazon River and near the Caquetá—it is also absent from Colombia.

To the eastern limit of its range, the Madeira River, upstream in Bolivia, the wattled curassow occurs patchily across most of northern Bolivia in a 700 km region surrounding the confluences to the Madeira's tributaries, four major rivers of northern Bolivia. In Brazil, the bird is only found in the wild in Amazonas state (it used to occur in Rondônia also), namely near the Juruá, the Javary, the Japurá, and at its northeasternmost limit around the confluence regions along the Solimões, Madeira, Rio Negro, and the Purus Rivers.

== Ecology ==
The habitat preference of the wattled curassow is not well studied either. Some have found it in terra firme rainforest on higher ground, but it probably occurs there in any numbers only in the wet season when the lowlands are flooded. Most sightings were in gallery forest along rivers and streams (particularly blackwater), seasonally flooded várzea forest, around lakes, and on river islands. Várzea seems to be key habitat for this species, at least seasonally. Mated pairs probably defend a territory as other curassows do, and many seem to be entirely sedentary for their whole life. Young birds would thus have to disperse a bit after growing up, if their parents are still alive. But even then they probably stay in the same general area, moving perhaps a few km/miles from their place of birth at most.

As almost all Galliformes do, it eats mostly plant matter, supplemented by some small (typically invertebrate) animals—including at least on occasion crustaceans and fish—but hardly any actual data exists. When foraging, it has been observed to rummage around on the ground less often than other Crax curassows, indicating that it may favor different food items (e.g. fresh fruit instead of dropped seeds) than its closest relatives.

The breeding season in the wild is unknown; reproductive activity has been noted between June and August but few records exist and as in many rainforest birds there might not be well-marked breeding and non-breeding seasons. Males court the females by strutting around them and giving booming calls. These birds copulate on the ground, and as in many other Galloanseres and in paleognaths the males have a kind of penis. Couples presumably form for years, often essentially for life, as in other curassows; a change of partners may occur occasionally, and were males are frequently hunted (their loud calls make them easy to stalk) survivors may pair up with more than one female.

The nest is a crude flat cup of twigs and leaves, small compared to the bird, built at off the ground in vegetation. As in all curassows, the clutch is generally two white eggs, which in this species probably measure about 3.5 by 2.5 in (89 by 64 mm); time to hatching is almost certainly around 30 days. Both parents tend for the precocial young, which might become independent at about one year of age or maybe earlier. However, it may also be that few birds less than two years of age are sexually mature, suggesting that the grown-up immatures could just as well spend another year or so living with or nearby their parents. A captive bird lived to an age of more than 20 years.

=== Status ===
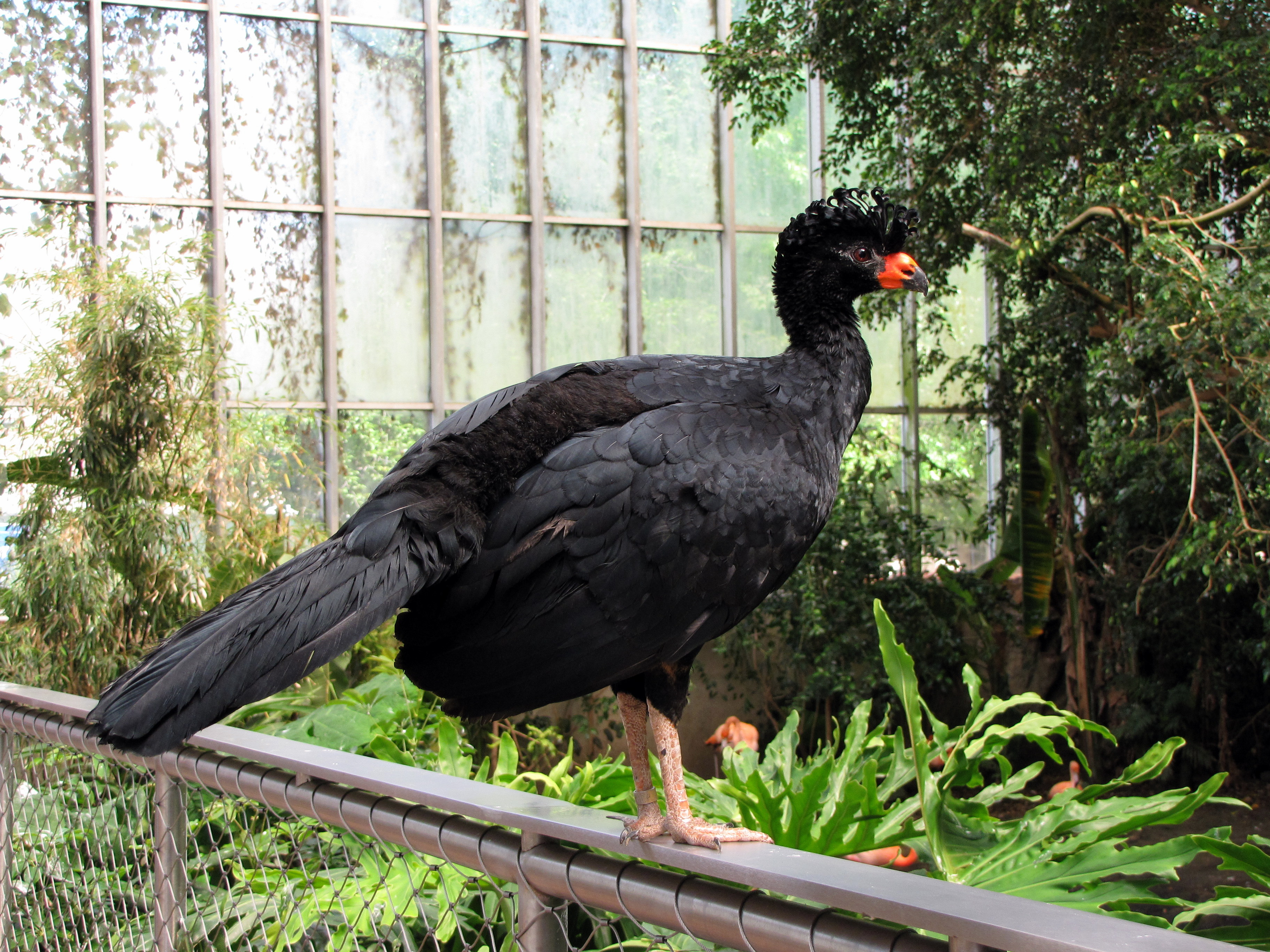
Wattled curassow female at the National Aviary

The wattled curassow is rarely found in the wild anymore, due to unsustainable hunting and habitat destruction. While its status has rarely been well studied, the number of old and modern records strongly indicates that it is much rarer nowadays than it was in the late 19th century. The species seems to have disappeared from Ecuador in the 1980s, while populations persist in remote areas of the other countries from which it is known. It is nowhere numerous, and the only known region where it can be encountered reasonably often might be along the Juruá River in Brazil, in particular in the Mamirauá Sustainable Development Reserve; it is also present in some numbers near San Marcos in Beni Department, Bolivia. It might occur in unexplored locations; its presence in Colombia for example was only proven around 1950 when a bird was shot in Caquetá Department, at Tres Troncos on the Caquetá River (from where the species has since disappeared). But any undiscovered populations are unlikely to be large—and even though they might remain unknown to science as soon as hunting with firearms starts in a region the wattled curassow is liable to get shot more often than it reproduces.

There may be somewhat more than 10,000 adult C. globulosa left in the world, but if few other populations exist apart from those known, it might number less than 5,000 individuals old and young altogether. A captive stock exists and by curassow standards is even reasonably plentiful. The species occasionally breeds in captivity, but this is entirely insufficient to counteract the decline in the wild—in particular as it is receives little legal protection and is not known from any protected area other than the Mamirauá Sustainable Development Reserve (a population from the Apaporis River near Chiribiquete National Park is apparently gone).

The IUCN used to classify the wattled curassow as a Vulnerable species under criteria A2bcd+3bcd+4bcd; C2a(i). This means that its numbers have declined and continue to decline by about one-third every decade, mainly due to hunting, with habitat destruction as another major threat, and that most likely between 2,500 and 10,000 adults exist, but not more than 1,000 in any one subpopulation. In 2010, this classification was uplifted to Endangered.
