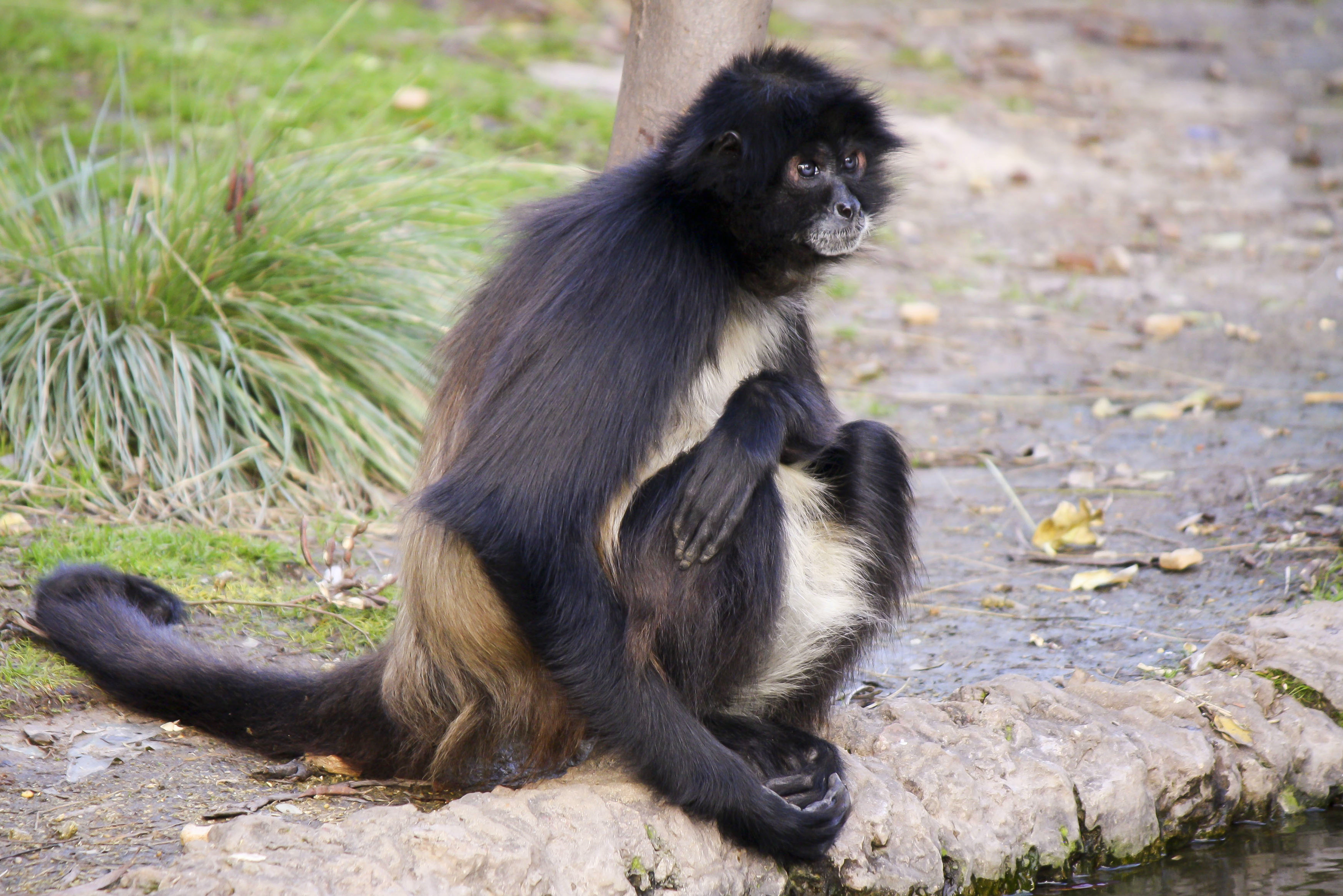
- Ateles belzebuth in Buenos Aires Zoo.

Conservation status
- Endangered (IUCN 3.1)

Scientific classification
- Kingdom: Animalia
- Phylum: Chordata
- Class: Mammalia
- Infraclass: Placentalia
- Order: Primates
- Family: Atelidae
- Genus: Ateles
- Species: A. belzebuth

Binomial name
- Ateles belzebuth É. Geoffroy, 1806
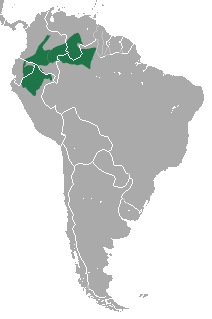
- White-bellied spider monkey range

= White-bellied spider monkey =

Species of New World monkey

The white-bellied spider monkey (Ateles belzebuth), also known as the white-fronted or long-haired spider monkey, is an endangered species of spider monkey, a type of New World monkey. It is found in the north-western Amazon in Colombia, Ecuador, Venezuela, Peru and Brazil, ranging as far south as the lower Ucayali River and as far east as the Branco River. In the past, the Peruvian, brown and white-cheeked spider monkeys have been treated as subspecies of A. belzebuth. As presently defined, the white-bellied spider monkey is monotypic. It has a whitish belly and a pale patch on the forehead, which, despite its common name, often is orange-buff, though this might be due to dirt and other stainers. They live in groups of 20 to 40 individuals, splitting into small parties of 1 to 9 when in activity.

Vernacular names include mono prieto, mico prieto and marimonda (Colombia).

Over the last 45 years (3 generations), the population has declined by approximately 50% due to habitat loss and hunting. Because of this, A. belzebuth is listed as endangered by the IUCN.

== Ecology ==
White-bellied spider monkeys are important long-distance seed dispersal agents for many fruit-bearing species. They are a dominant disperser for Oenocarpus bataua, a species of palm. A. belzebuth often occupies a large territory and will utilize multiple nesting trees throughout their territory. Seeds of preferred species are often dispersed below sleeping trees.

They live in social groups that operate using fission-fusion dynamics. These groups are characterized by fragmenting into subgroups that travel, feed and sleep together. These groups display great fluidity and will often change composition, sometimes changing several times each day. The composition of these groups can be influenced by the reproductive status of females. Females are usually more solitary than males, but females with dependent offspring are more likely to join a large group than those without dependent offspring. Females will also usually remain in small core ranges within their home territories with their offspring while males will utilize more of their home range. These subgroups are brought together with long distance vocalizations. These long distance vocalizations can be up to a kilometer away.

When two subgroups reunite after foraging, they greet each other excitedly by vocalizing, chasing, hugging each other, and sniffing pectoral glands.

There is no evidence of secondary dispersal in wild spider monkeys. Therefore, males in these groups are closely related to each other.

== Reproduction ==
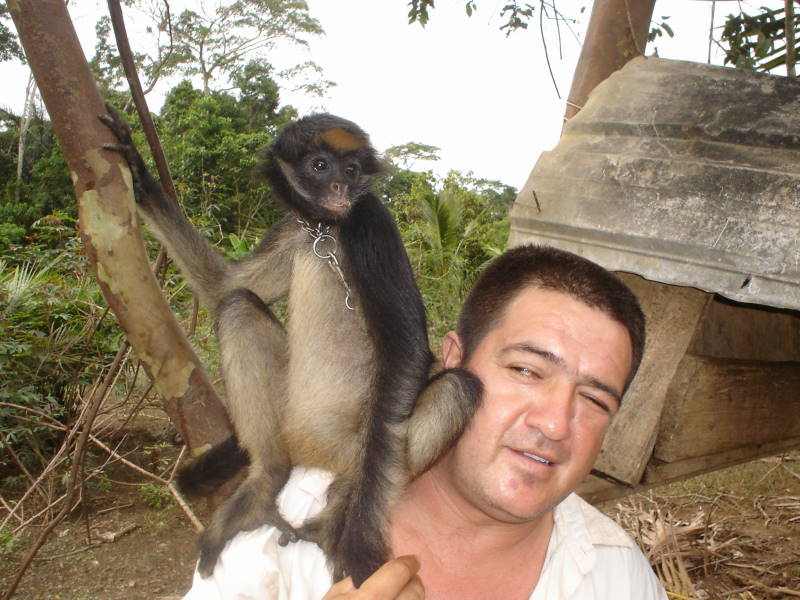
Pet spider monkey on man's shoulder

White-bellied spider monkeys are believed to achieve sexual maturity at between 4 and 5 years of age and will usually produce a single offspring although females giving birth to twins has been reported. Their gestation period is between 226 and 232 days long.

Copulations are initiated by females, and this pattern of greater female mate choice shared by other spider monkeys is believed to reduce aggression in males.

Males have been observed engaging in infanticide. All victims of observed infanticide were from the same social group as their attackers and all were young males.

== Feeding ==
The diet of White-bellied spider monkeys is 83% mature fruits and they are important to the seed dispersal of many fruit-bearing species. They carry a relatively high number of intact seeds in their gut and intake relatively large amounts of fruit pulp when compared to some other monkey species within their range. They also are likely to return to previous food sources and spend relatively little time foraging. A. belzebuth is a generalist frugivore that doesn't specialize in a particular fruit type but do appear to prefer fruits with high lipid content, high sugar content, or fruits produced by trees with high fruit productivity. They will also feed on other plant parts such as leaves, flowers, and bulbs, and will very rarely consume small insects. A. belzebuth has also been observed engaging in geophagy.

== Locomotion ==
All members of Ateles are semi-brachiators, and this species has an intermembral index of 105. They have a fairly dorsally placed scapula to allow for increased mobility involved in brachiation. Their prehensile tail with a hairless gripping pad at the end also allows for this locomotion, which then means they have increased caudal vertebrae, with about 31 caudal vertebrae as opposed to another platyrrhine like Cebus with only 23 on average. This tail allows for additional grasping of branches, which means there is less lateral movement while brachiating which increases efficiency. The hairless gripping pad of the underside of the tip of their tail is often compared to a finger, since it allows surface gripping. Their curved hands with long metacarpal bones allows for easy brachiation. They do not have an external thumb, which sets them apart from most other primates.

== Dentition ==
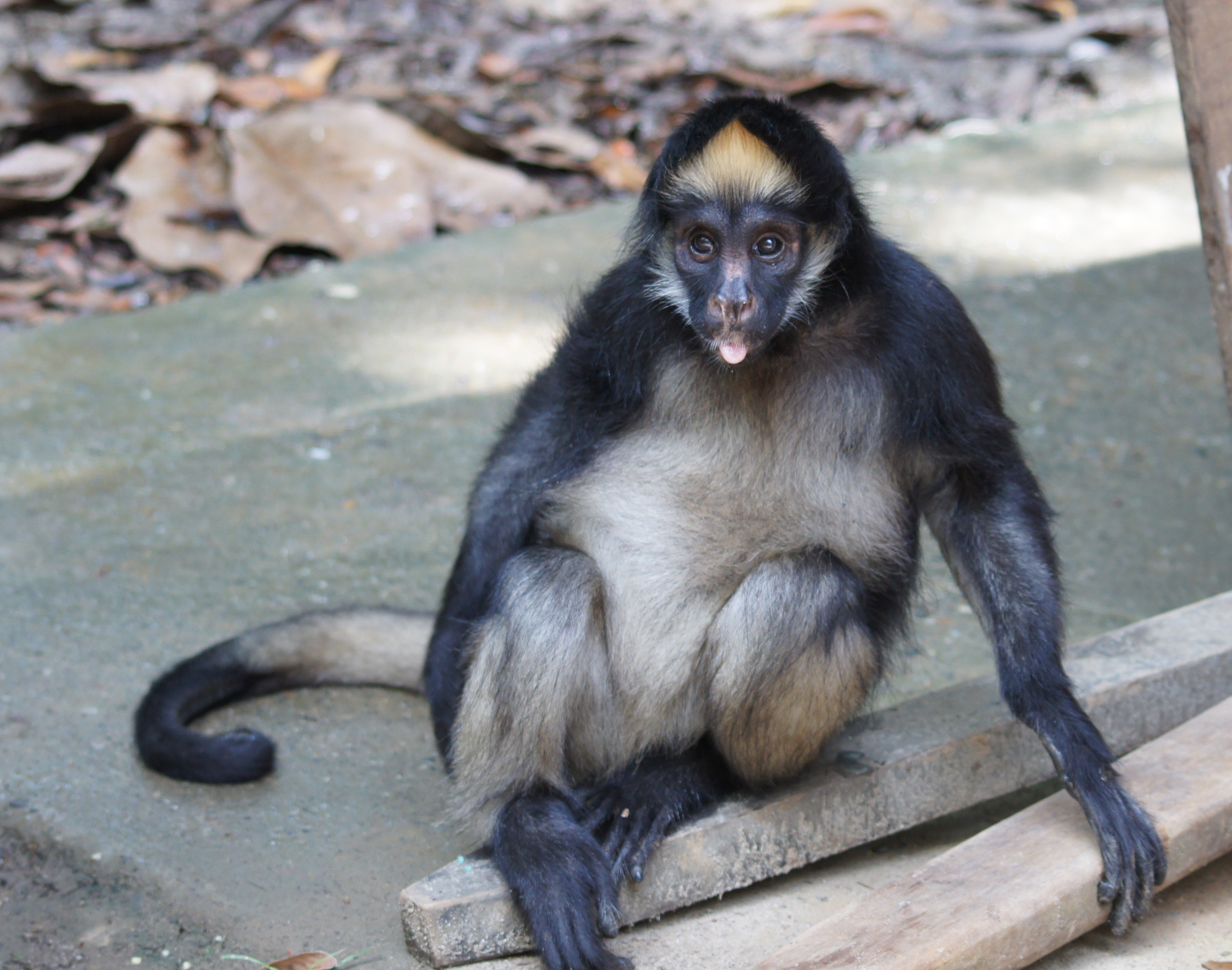
Spider monkey in Ecuador.

Ateles belzebuth has a dental formula of 2.1.3.3. As far as patterns within the teeth, there is a lot of variation but the following are often found within Ateles. Larger incisors and small molars reflect the largely frugivorous diet, with a diastema separating the upper canines from the upper incisors, for the lower incisor. The upper premolars have one to two cusps, with the first premolar having only one cusp, a paracone. The second premolar has a paracone and protocone cusp connected by transverse crest. The third premolar has three cusps, paracone, metacone, and protocone, with the metacone and protocone connected by a crista oblique. There is a recorded hypocone on the third premolar. In the bottom premolars, the first premolar has one cusp although it can be bicuspid. The second and third premolar generally have 2-3 cusps, although the second bottom premolar has an entoconid and hypoconid and the third bottom premolar in belzebuth has five cusps with a small hypoconulid. Upper molars generally have four cusps although the third molar may not have a hypocone (might even have only two cusps). With the bottom molars, there are generally four cusps and a fifth cusp on the third molar.

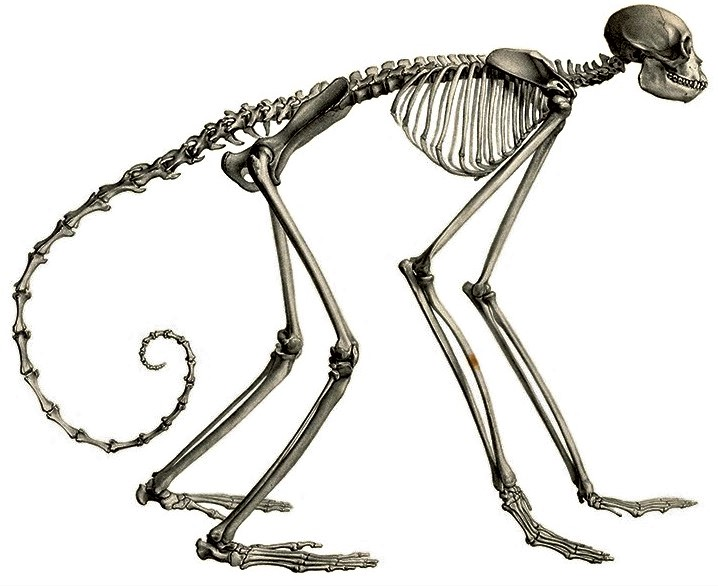
Ateles belzebuth skeleton

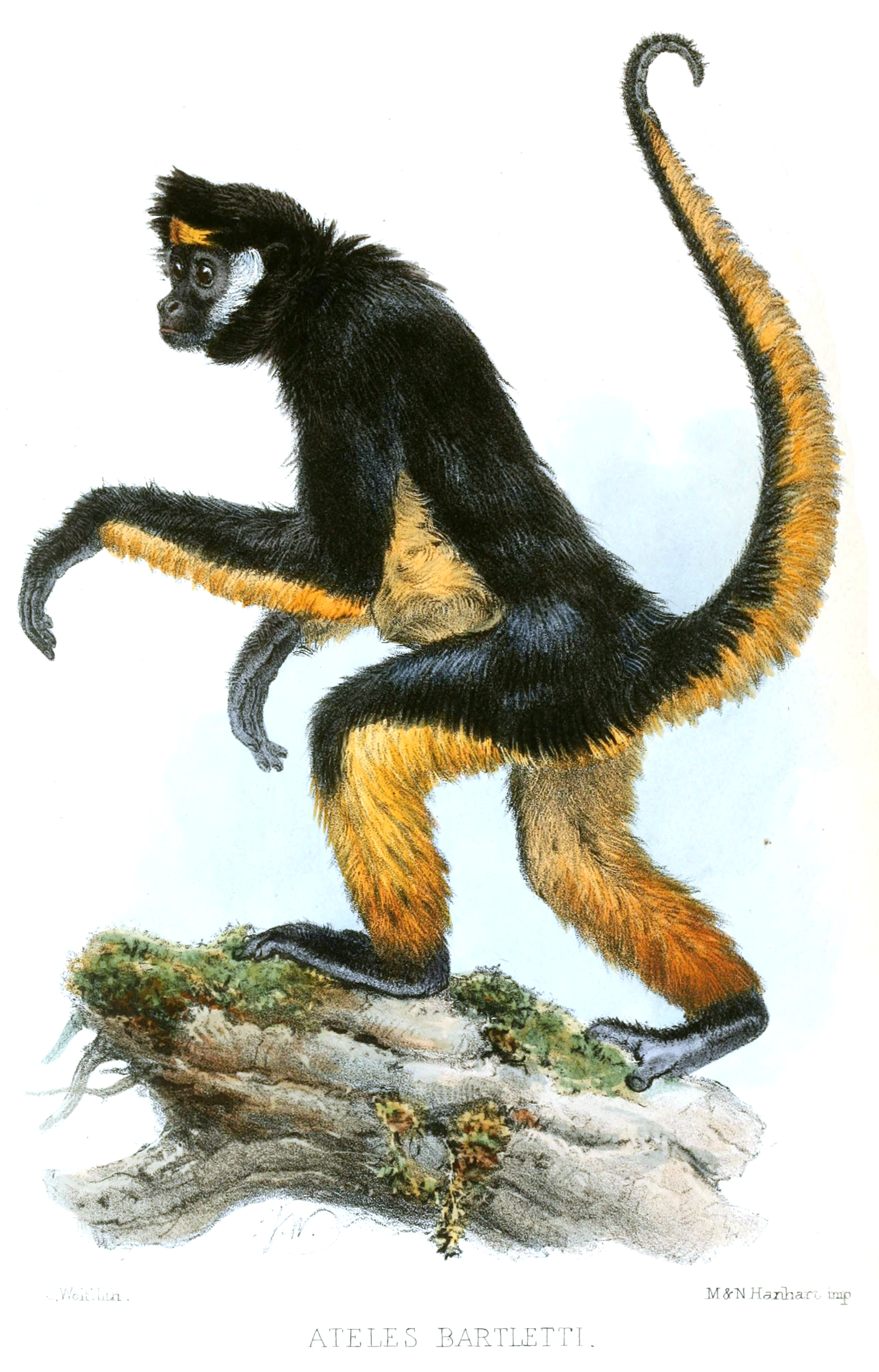
Ateles Belzebuth Drawing
