= Southwest Amazon moist forests =

Ecoregion in the Upper Amazon basin

Southwest Amazon moist forests (NT0166)
- One of the rare species of the ecoregion, the bald uakari (Cacajao calvus) is restricted to várzea forests and other wooded habitats near water in the western Amazon rainforest of Brazil and Peru.

- Location in South America

Ecology
- Realm: Neotropical
- Biome: Tropical and subtropical moist broadleaf forests

Geography
- Area: 749,800 km^{2} (289,500 sq mi)
- Countries: Peru, Brazil, Bolivia
- Coordinates: 10.173527°S 71.515218°W
- Climate type: Am: equatorial, monsoonal

The Southwest Amazon moist forests (NT0166) is an ecoregion located in the Upper Amazon basin.

The forest is characterized by a relatively flat landscape with alluvial plains dissected by undulating hills or high terraces. The biota of the southwest Amazon moist forest is very rich because of these dramatic edaphic and topographical variations at both the local and regional levels. This ecoregion has the highest number of both mammals and birds recorded for the Amazonian biogeographic realm: 257 with 11 endemic species for mammals and 782 and 17 endemics for birds. The inaccessibility of this region, along with few roads, has kept most of the habitat intact. Also, there are a number of protected areas, which preserve this extremely biologically rich ecoregion.

== Location ==
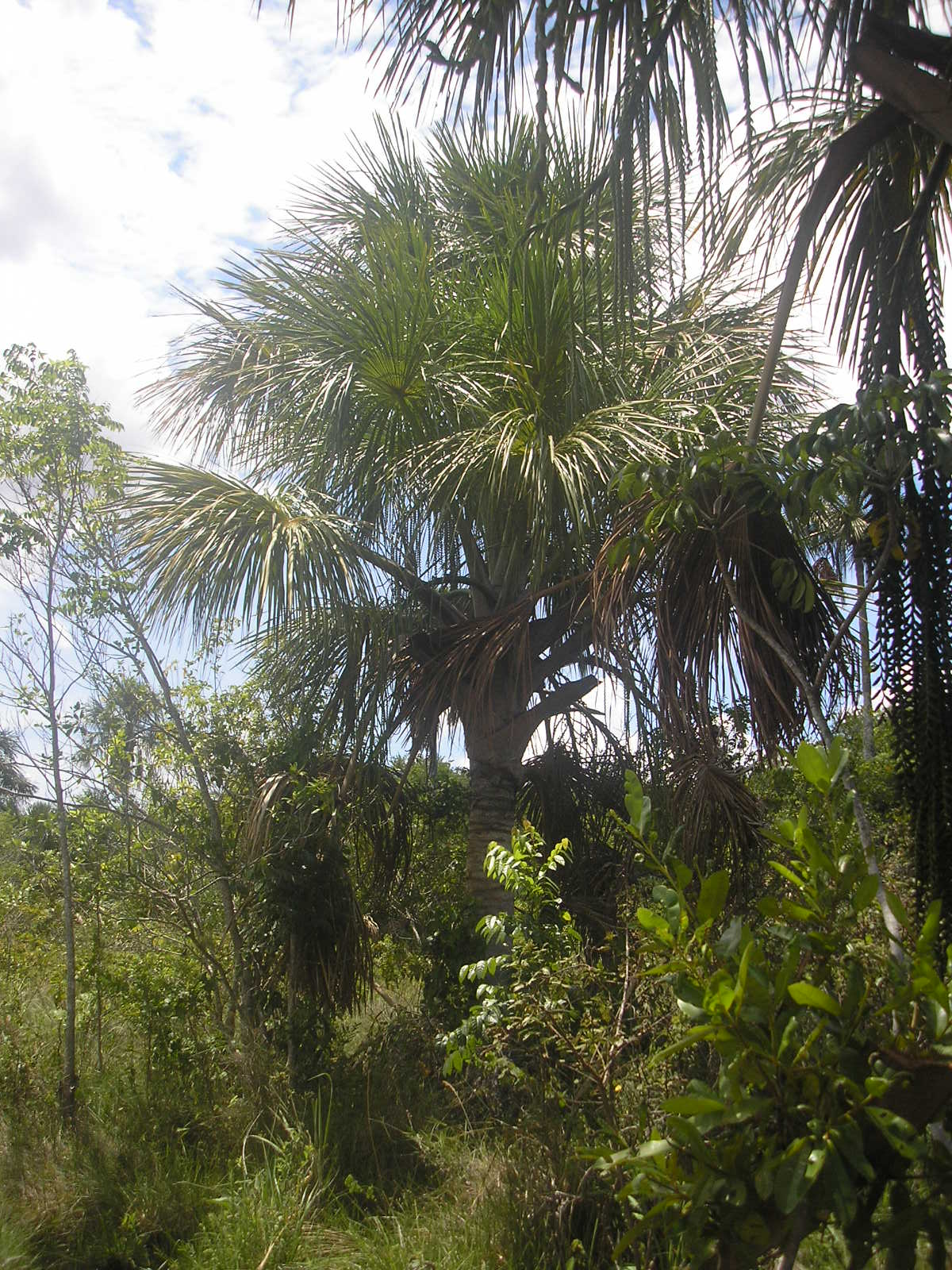
Mauritia flexuosa, or moriche palm, is an economically important species dominant in some parts of the ecoregion.

The southwest Amazon moist forest region covers an extensive area of the Upper Amazon Basin comprising four sub-basins: (1) both the Pastaza-Marañon and (2) Ucayali River sub-basins drain into the Upper Amazon River in Peru; (3) the Acre and (4) Madre de Dios-Beni sub-basins drain to the east into the Juruá, Purus and Madeira Rivers; which, in turn, feed into the Amazon River lower down in Brazil. The region is bisected north to south between Peru and Brazil by the small mountain range Serra do Divisor. It extends east to the edge of the Purus Arch, or ancient zone of uplift, in the southwestern area of the Brazilian State of Amazonas. It then extends southeast into northern Bolivia and in a narrow band south along the base of the Andes Mountains. Elevations range from 300 metres (980 ft) in the west to 100 metres (330 ft) on the eastern edge of the region.

Landforms present in this region include the upland terra firme (non-flooded) mostly on nutrient-poor lateritic soils, ancient alluvial plains (mostly non-flooded) on nutrient-rich soils, and present alluvial plains (várzea, seasonally flooded) of super-rich sediments renewed with each annual flood. Floristically, distinct lowland humid forest types occur on each of these landforms with the terra firme mature forests and late successional, seasonally flooded forest being the two major types. Permanent swamp forests are common on the alluvial plains. Pockets of nutrient-poor white sand soils are found here that host forests of lower height, a more open forest canopy, and lower alpha diversity, but with many endemics. The forests are mostly dense tropical rain forest, but some patches of open forest exist.

The ecoregion contains stretches of Iquitos várzea along the main rivers, blending into Purus várzea near the eastern border, where it adjoins the Juruá–Purus moist forests ecoregion. In the southeast, it adjoins the Purus–Madeira moist forests and Madeira–Tapajós moist forests, and in the south merges into the Beni savanna and Bolivian Yungas. In the southwest, it adjoins the Peruvian Yungas. To the west, it adjoins the Ucayali moist forests. In the north it is separated by a band of Iquitos varzea from the Solimões–Japurá moist forests.

== General description of flora ==
Because the ecoregion covers such a vast area, there are climatic, edaphic and floristic differences within it. Generally, the wetter and less seasonal northern forests (3,000 millimetres (120 in) of rain annually) share only 44 percent of the tree species with forests in the slightly drier, more seasonal southern region. This region receives from 1,500 to 2,100 millimetres (59 to 83 in) of rain annually, in different parts. Temperatures over the year range from 22 to 27 °C (72 to 81 °F).

At first glance, large areas may appear to be homogeneous dense forests with a canopy 30 to 40 metres (98 to 131 ft) high with some emergent trees to 50 metres (160 ft) towering above the canopy. Structurally, this may be the case; however, the species composition reflects much the opposite: tree species variability reaches upwards to 300 species in a single hectare. There are a few exceptions to this high diversity, mainly where stands dominated by one or several species occur. The first are vast areas (more than 180,000 square kilometres (69,000 sq mi)) dominated by the highly competitive arborescent bamboos Guadua sarcocarpa and Guadua weberbaueri near Acre, Brazil extending into Peru and Bolivia. Other monodominant stands include swamp forests of the economically important palms Mauritia flexuosa and Jessenia bataua.

In the north of the region, some of the best known plants yield products of commercial value, such as rubber (Hevea brasiliensis), mahogany (Swietenia macrophylla), balsam wood (Myroxylon balsamum), timber and essential oil (Amburana acreana), tagua nut (Phytelephas microcarpa), and strychnine (Strychnos asperula). An area representative of the southern part of this region, in the north of Bolivia, hosts a seasonal humid high forest to 35 metres (115 ft) with some emergents reaching 40 metres (130 ft) in height and many buttressed trunks. The largest trees are Ceiba pentandra, Poulsenia armata, Calycophyllum spruceanum, Swietenia macrophylla, and Dipteryx odorata. Other trees typical in this area are Calycophyllum acreanum, Terminalia amazonica, Combretum laxum, Mezilaurus itauba, Didymopanax morototoni, Jacaranda copaia, Aspidosperma megalocarpon, Vochisia vismiaefolia, Hirtella lightioides, and Hura crepitans. Palms include, among others, members of the genera Astrocaryum, Iriartea and Sheelea, Oenocarpus mapora, Chelyocarpus chuco, Phytelephas macrocarpa, Euterpe precatoria, and Jessenia bataua. Lianas are common with about 43 species present. Many Amazonian species reach the southern limit of their distribution here. The Brazil nut tree (Bertholletia excelsa) is present in the south, but is likely not native this far west in Amazonia.

== Biodiversity features ==
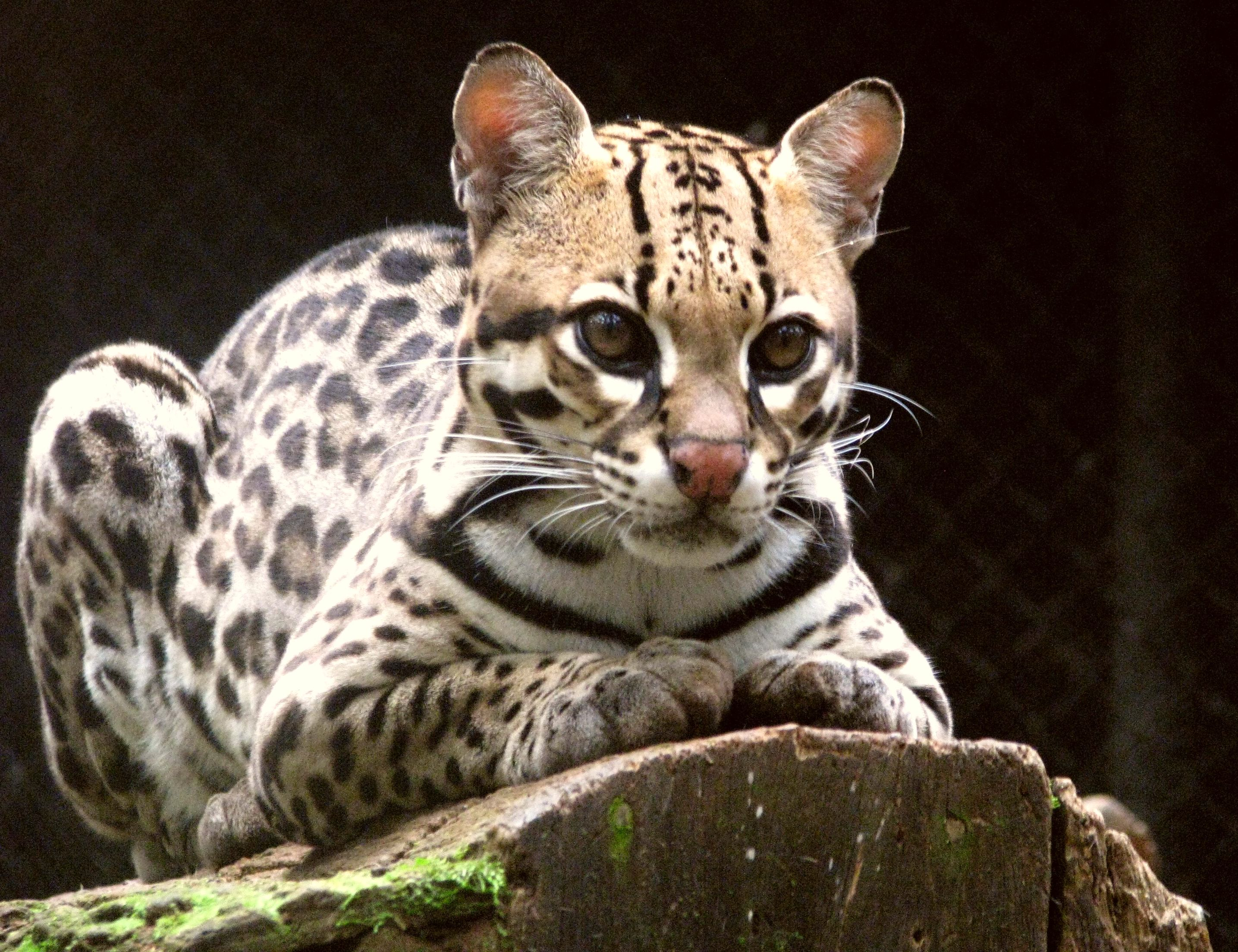
Leopardus pardalis, the ocelot, is a threatened species that finds a home in the southwest Amazon moist forests.

What is distinctive about this region is the diversity of habitats created by edaphic, topographic and climatic variability. Habitat heterogeneity, along with a complex geological and climatic history has led to a high cumulative biotic richness. Endemism and overall richness is high in vascular plants, invertebrates and vertebrate animals. This is the Amazon Basin's center of diversity for palms. The rare palm Itaya amicorum is found on the upper Javari River. This ecoregion has the highest number of mammals recorded for the Amazonian biogeographic realm: 257 with 11 endemics. Bird richness is also highest here with 782 species and 17 endemics. In the southern part of the Tambopata Reserve, one area that is 50 square kilometres (19 sq mi) holds the record for bird species: 554. On the white sand areas in the north, plants endemic to this soil type include Jacqueshuberia loretensis, Ambelania occidentalis, Spathelia terminalioides, and Hirtella revillae.

Many widespread Amazonian mammals and reptiles find a home in this region. These include tapirs (Tapirus terrestris), jaguars (Panthera onca), the world's largest living rodents, capybaras (Hydrochoerus hydrochaeris), kinkajous (Potos flavus), and white-lipped peccaries (Tayassu pecari). Some of the globally threatened animals found in this region include black caimans (Melanosuchus niger) and spectacled caimans (Caiman crocodilus crocodilus), woolly monkeys (Lagothrix lagotricha), giant otters (Pteronura brasiliensis), giant anteaters (Myrmecophaga tridactyla), and ocelots (Leopardus pardalis).

Pygmy marmosets (Cebuella pygmaea), Goeldi marmosets (Callimico goeldii), pacaranas (Dinomys branickii), and eastern lowland olingos (Bassaricyon alleni) are found here, but not in regions to the east. Other primates present include tamarins (Saguinus fuscicollis and Saguinus imperator), brown pale-fronted capuchins (Cebus albifrons), squirrel monkeys (Saimiri sciureus), white-faced sakis (Pithecia irrorata), and black spider monkeys (Ateles paniscus). The rare red uakari monkeys (Cacajao calvus) are found in the north in swamp forests. Nocturnal two-toed sloths (Choloepus hoffmanni) are well distributed throughout this region along with the widespread three-toes sloths (Bradypus variegatus). The Amazon River is a barrier to a number of animals such as the tamarins Saguinus nigricollis, which occur on the north side, and Saguinus mystax, which occurs on the southwest side of the Amazon-Ucayali system.

In the region of Manu, 68 species of reptiles and 68 species of amphibians have been reported for the lowland areas while 113 species of amphibians and 118 species of reptiles are reported from Madre de Dios, including the rare and interesting pit-vipers (Bothrops bilineatus, Bothrops brazili), and frogs such as Dendrophidion sp., Rhadinaea occipitalis, and Xenopholis scalaris.

== Current status ==
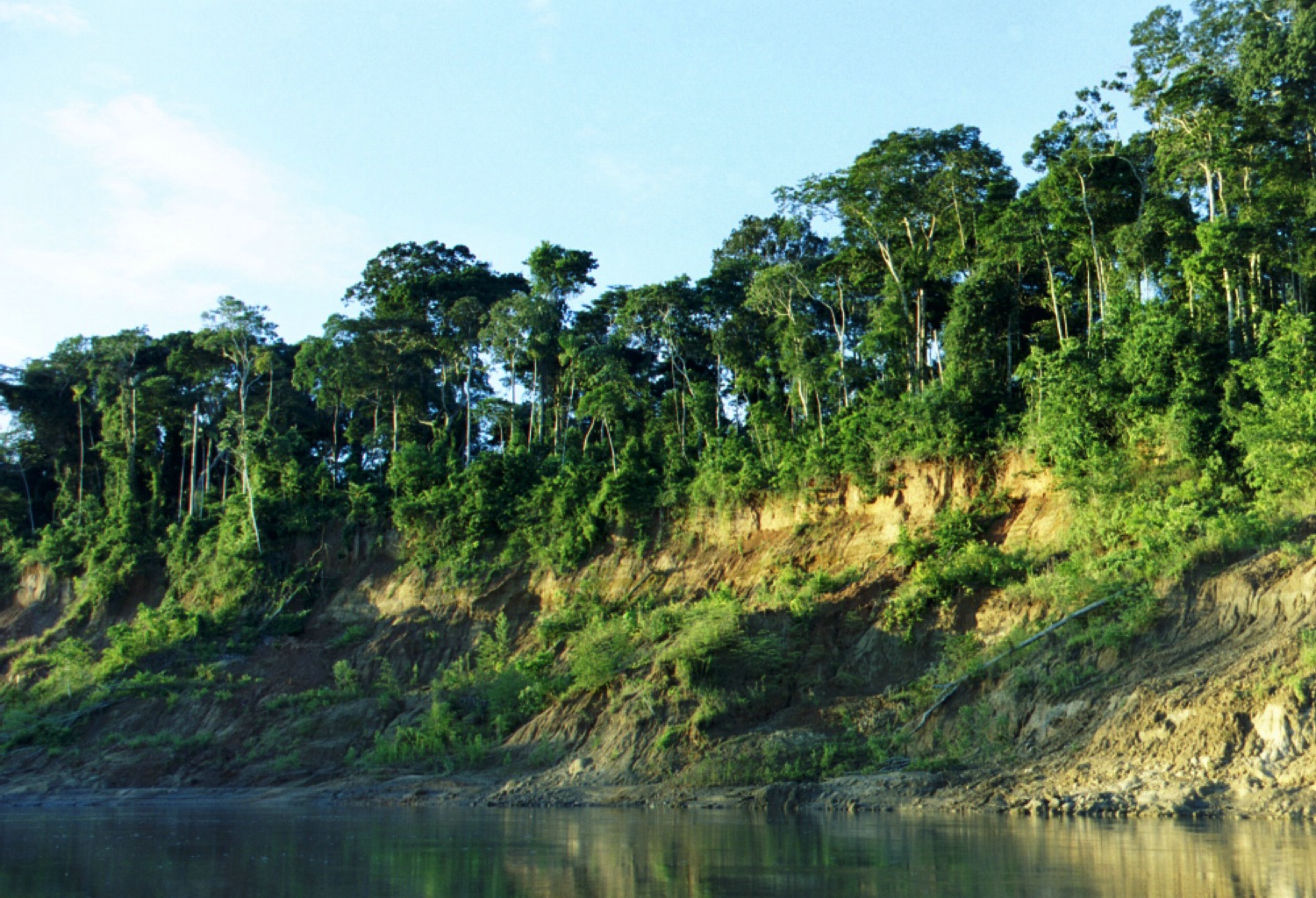
The riverbank of Manú National Park.

Much of the natural habitat of the region remains intact, protected by sheer inaccessibility. People have dwelled along the major rivers for millennia and have subtly altered the forests on a small scale, but around the urban centers development proceeds. Very few roads exist in the region, limiting development. Intense deforestation is constrained to the few roads that do exist or around urban centers such as Iquitos, Puerto Maldonado, and Rio Branco.

Manú National Park, a World Heritage Site, protects 15,328 square kilometres (5,918 sq mi) of pristine lowland forest in southern Peru, a large part of which falls into this ecoregion. The nearby Tambopata-Candamo reserve protects seven major forest types. This reserve offers refuge to game species that have been over-hunted in other areas such as tapirs, spider monkeys, jaguars, capybaras, white-lipped peccaries, monkeys, caimans and river turtles. The Manuripi-Heath Amazonian Wildlife National Reserve is located in the southernmost area of this region in Bolivia covering 18,900 square kilometres (7,300 sq mi) of dense tropical forest. Several extractive reserves, the largest being Chico Mendes Extractive Reserve and Alto Juruá Extractive Reserve, are actively managed in Brazil. Other protected areas include national parks (Serra do Divisor National Park, Madidi National Park, Isoboro Secure National Park, Bahuaja-Sonene National Park), national forests, Rio Acre Ecological Station, Antimari State Forest, Apurimac Reserve Zone, among others. Most protected areas suffer from insufficient administration and patrol.

== Types and severity of threats ==
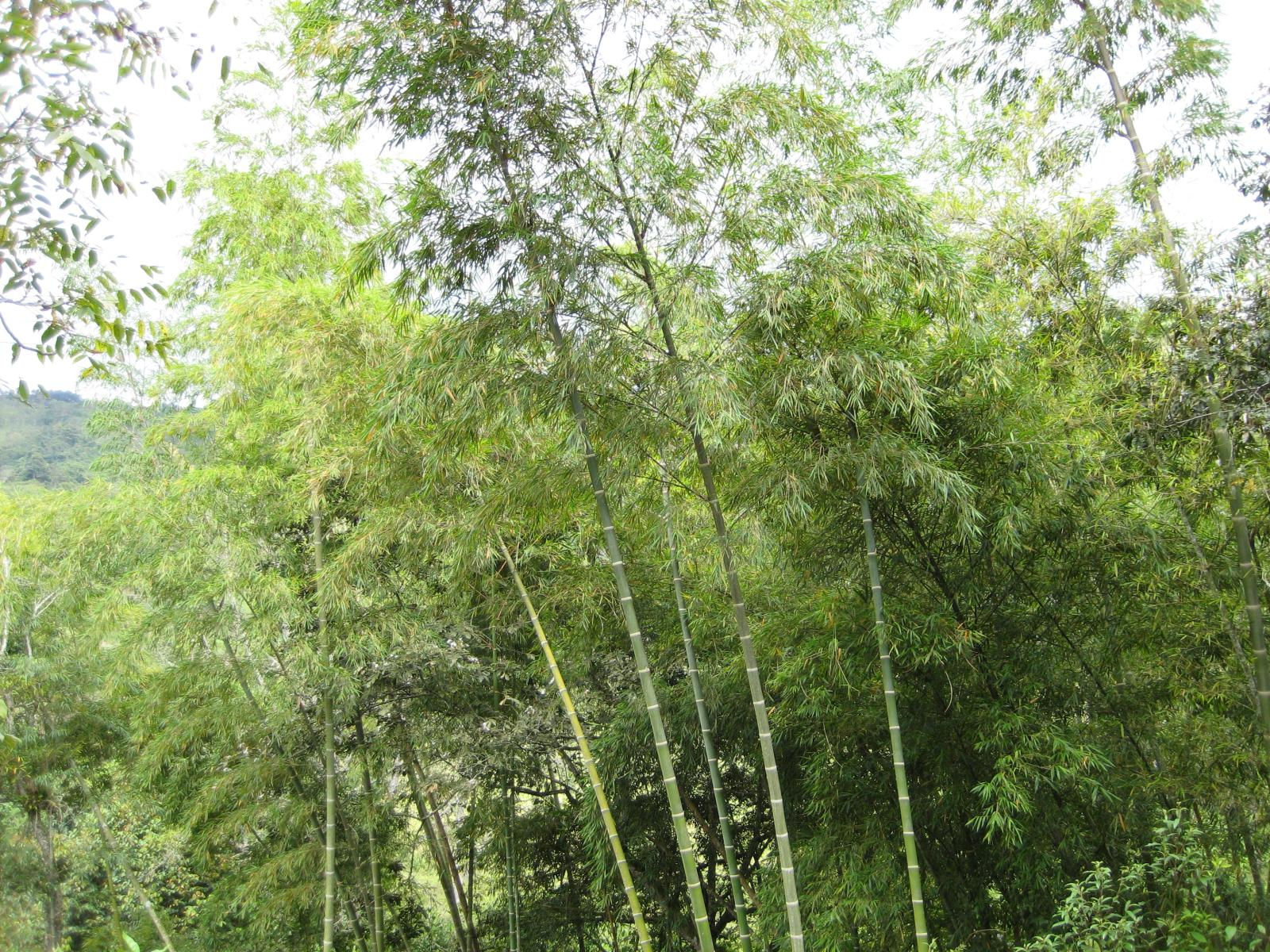
The invasive Guadua bamboo is threatening the natural ecodiversity of the region.

Hunting may be threatening populations of the tapir (Tapirus terrestris) and large primates in the north. Some habitat is threatened by expansion of the agricultural and pastoral frontier, gold mining, and selective logging that erodes the genetic diversity of a few valuable timber species. The economically important palm Euterpe precatoria is being depleted in some areas by unsustainable palm heart extraction. A dramatic problem that exists in the Brazilian State of Acre and in the adjacent area of Peru is the spread of the invasive Guadua bamboo forests. This highly competitive bamboo invades and dominates abandoned clearings and threatens to dominate the disturbed areas in this region. Logging along major rivers and near urban centers has decimated populations of mahogany (Swietenia macrophylla), tropical cedar (Cedrela odorata), and kapok (Ceiba pentandra).

During the period from 2004 to 2011 the ecoregion experienced an annual rate of habitat loss of 0.17%.
