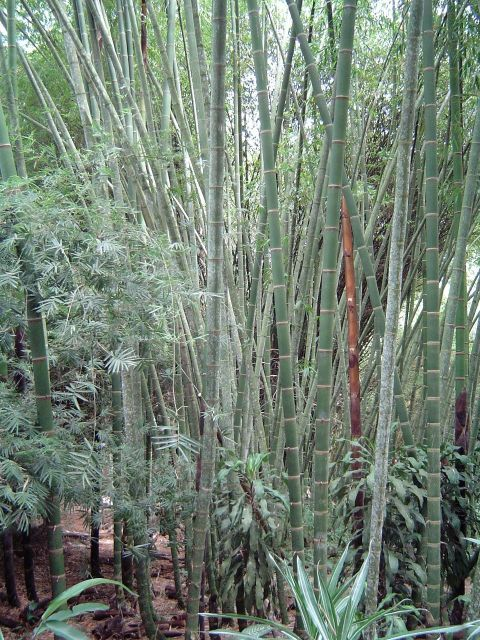
- Guadua angustifolia

Scientific classification
- Kingdom: Plantae
- Clade: Tracheophytes
- Clade: Angiosperms
- Clade: Monocots
- Clade: Commelinids
- Order: Poales
- Family: Poaceae
- Subfamily: Bambusoideae
- Tribe: Bambuseae
- Subtribe: Guaduinae
- Genus: Guadua; Kunth

Type species
- Guadua angustifolia Kunth

Synonyms
- Bambusa Mutis ex Caldas 1809, illegitimate homonym not Schreb. 1789

= Guadua =

Genus of grasses

Guadua is a Neotropical genus of thorny, clumping bamboo in the grass family, ranging from moderate to very large species.

Physically, Guadua angustifolia is noted for being the largest Neotropical bamboo. The genus is similar to Bambusa and is sometimes included in that genus. Several animals are, to a various extent, associated with stands of Guadua bamboo, for example several species of seedeaters, and the Amazon and Atlantic Bamboo Rats.

== Distribution and habitats ==
The genus can be found in a wide range from northern Mexico and Trinidad to Uruguay, but most of the species are concentrated in the Amazon basin and the Orinoco basin. They usually grow at low elevations (below 1,500 m), but has been found up to 2,500 m. Its habitats include lowland tropical and lower-montane forest, savannas, Cerrados, gallery forest, and disturbed inter-Andean valley vegetation.

== Human use ==
From a utilitarian perspective, Guadua is the most important American bamboo. Due to its quality, the genus has been widely used for house construction along the inter-Andean rivers of Colombia and in coastal Ecuador.

Guadua angustifolia, endemic to Tropical America, is slowly becoming well known once again as a building material. Highly appreciated by Simon Bolivar for its watershed protection and praised by Alexander von Humboldt for its wide variety of uses, it is being used in construction today in South America.

Technical studies of bamboo's mechanical properties ("vegetable steel") have increased interest in its use. Although bamboo culms used for building can be harvested in natural forests, over-exploitation leads to the depletion of natural resources. For large-scale use of Guadua angustifolia, the management of sustainable bamboo forests and groves, as well as the establishment of new nurseries and plantations, is a priority.

Tropical bamboo can be propagated with cuttings or by covering complete culms with soil. The next year, new plants will sprout. Or, many Guadua species can be propagated more rapidly by the chusquin method. Under this method, culms are cut at ground level when harvesting causing many small shoots and new plants to grow around the original plant. This method is suitable for large-scale forests or farm cooperatives. Since bamboo is a grass, harvesting it down to the soil induces more new shoots to emerge, just like turf grass. This is a phenomenon not known in tropical hardwood forests.

Even more rapid methods have been recently developed through the use of tissue culture. Bamboo propagated in a laboratory in the space of one square meter will be sufficient to establish one hectare of new forest. These plants can also be readily transported in a one-half-cubic-meter box. Harvesting can begin six years after planting, making bamboo a potential source of tropical biomass production for industry (e.g., biofuels). For architectural purposes, Guadua angustifolia is the preferred bamboo species. Its diameter is constant for the first 15 meters and then tapers at the top. These features have attracted the attention of civil engineers, architects, academics, designers, and artists.

Environmentally, Guadua angustifolia is effective at removing carbon dioxide from the atmosphere due to its fast growth; ongoing studies in Colombia have now been coordinated by the Environmental Bamboo Foundation.

German Fire Authorities tested Guadua angustifolia and, guided by the European Building Code, approved bamboo as a building material for the Guadua Pavilion at Expo 2000 in Hanover. Bamboo construction is also reported to be earthquake-resistant. This concept has been studied in Ecuador by the International Bamboo and Rattan Organization and the Ecuadorian government. Costa Rica reported similar experiences in earlier earthquakes there.

== Species ==
35 species are accepted.

- Guadua aculeata E.Fourn. – eastern Mexico to Panama
- Guadua amplexifolia J.Presl – from San Luis Potosí to Venezuela
- Guadua angustifolia Kunth – from Puebla to Argentina
- Guadua bambuzoniae Londoño – Colombia
- Guadua calderoniana Londoño & Judz. – Bahia
- Guadua chacoensis (Rojas Acosta) Londoño & P.M.Peterson – Argentina, Bolivia, Paraguay, Uruguay, southern Brazil
- Guadua chaparensis Londoño & Zurita – Cochabamba in Bolivia
- Guadua ciliata Londoño & Davidse – Venezuela and northern Brazil
- Guadua glomerata Munro – Venezuela, Brazil, Bolivia, Peru, Ecuador, Guyana, French Guiana
- Guadua incana Londoño – Caquetá in Colombia
- Guadua inermis E.Fourn. – Central, eastern, and southeastern Mexico
- Guadua latifolia (Bonpl.) Kunth – Brazil, Venezuela, Guyana, Suriname, French Guiana, Trinidad and Tobago
- Guadua leonardoana Afonso, L.G.Clark & P.L.Viana – Brazil (Pará)
- Guadua longifolia (E.Fourn.) R.W.Pohl – from Sonora to Honduras
- Guadua lynnclarkiae Londoño – Peru
- Guadua macclurei R.W.Pohl & Davidse – Honduras to Panama
- Guadua macrospiculata Londoño & L.G.Clark – Amazonas in Colombia, Amazonas in Brazil, Loreto in Peru
- Guadua macrostachya Rupr. – Peru, Brazil, Guyana, French Guiana
- Guadua maculosa (Hack.) E.G.Camus – Goiás
- Guadua magna Londoño & Filg. – Goiás
- Guadua paniculata Munro – from Mexico to Paraguay
- Guadua paraguayana Döll – Paraguay, Argentina, Bolivia, Brazil, Venezuela
- Guadua refracta Munro – from Nicaragua to Bolivia
- Guadua sarcocarpa Londoño & P.M.Peterson – Peru, Bolivia, Brazil
- Guadua superba Huber – Peru, Bolivia, Brazil, Ecuador, Colombia, Guyana, Suriname, French Guiana
- Guadua tagoara (Nees) Kunth – Brazil, Misiones, French Guiana
- Guadua takahashiae Londoño – Peru
- Guadua trinii (Nees) Rupr. – Argentina, Bolivia, Paraguay, Uruguay, southern Brazil
- Guadua tuxtlensis Londoño & Ruiz-Sanchez – Veracruz
- Guadua uncinata Londoño & L.G.Clark – Ecuador, Colombia
- Guadua variegata Lizarazu – Argentina (Misiones)
- Guadua velutina Londoño & L.G.Clark – Mexico
- Guadua venezuelae Munro – Venezuela
- Guadua virgata (Trin.) Rupr. – Goiás
- Guadua weberbaueri Pilg. – from Venezuela to Bolivia

=== Formerly included ===
see Arthrostylidium, Aulonemia, Bambusa, Chusquea, Eremocaulon, and Sphaerobambos

- Guadua capitata – Eremocaulon capitatum
- Guadua exaltata – Arthrostylidium longiflorum
- Guadua flabellata – Chusquea bilimekii
- Guadua pallescens – Bambusa tuldoides
- Guadua parviflora – Aulonemia parviflora
- Guadua perligulata – Chusquea perligulata
- Guadua philippinensis – Sphaerobambos philippinensis

== Gallery ==
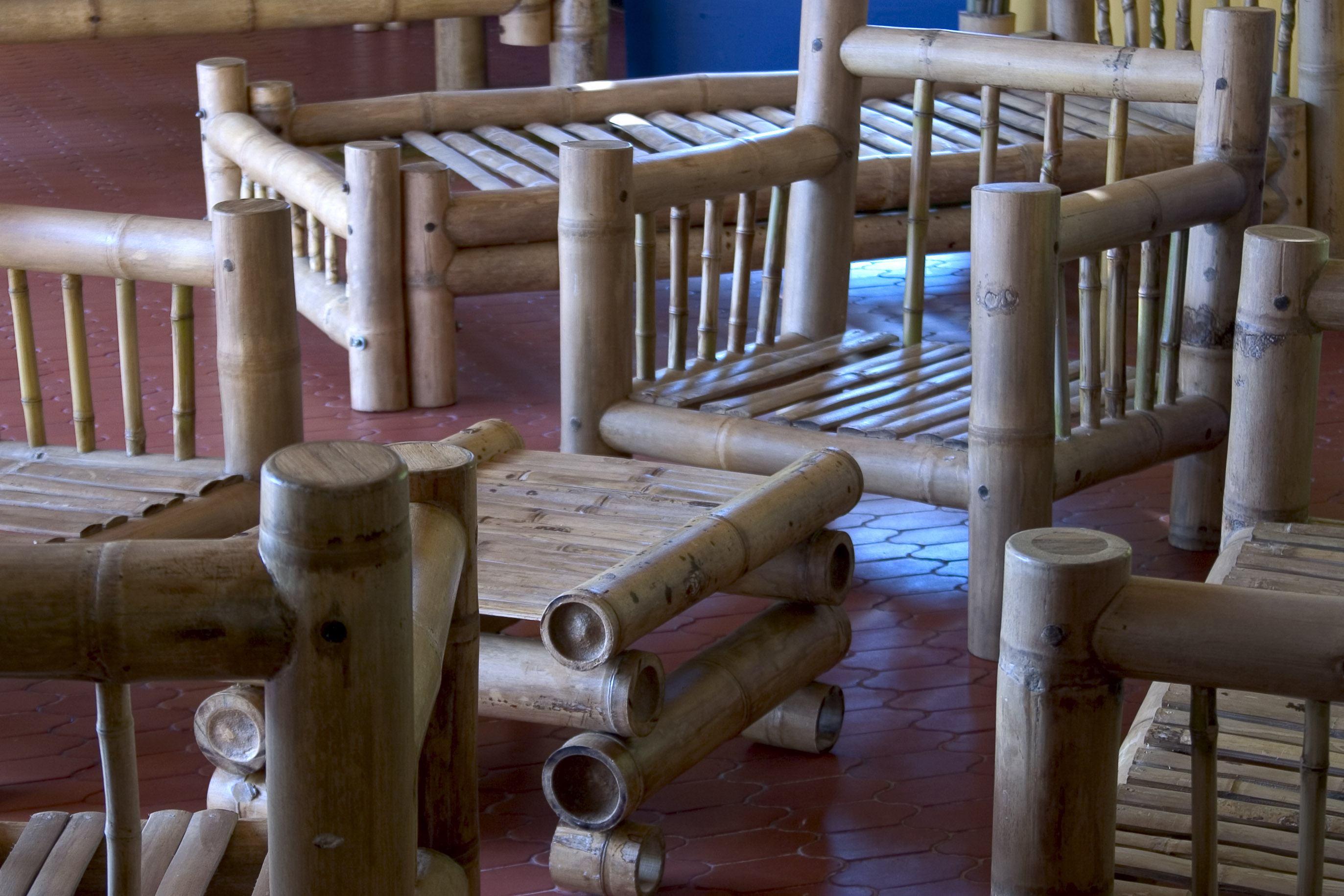
Handcrafted Guadua furniture is typical of the Paisa region

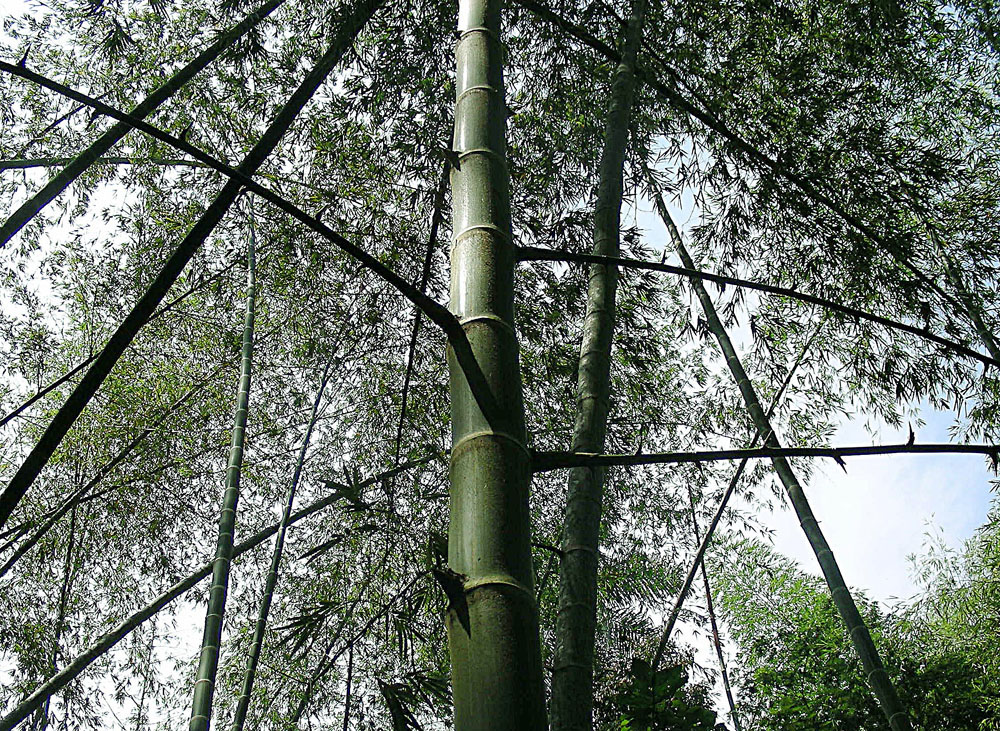
Guadua angustifolia on a plantation in Colombia
