= Bamboo construction =

Utilization of bamboo for construction

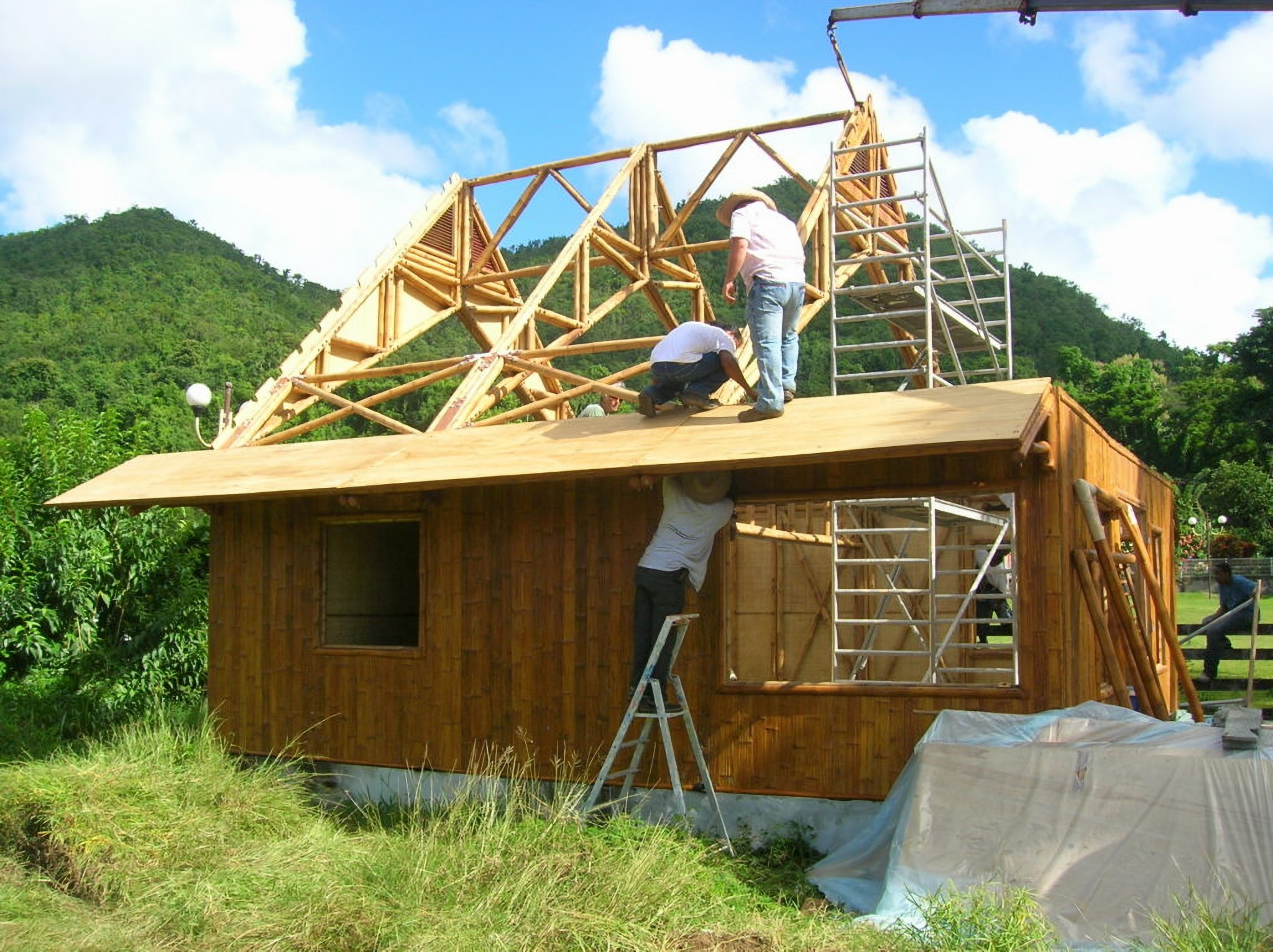
House made entirely of bamboo

Bamboo construction involves the use of bamboo as a building material for scaffolding, bridges, houses and buildings. In many parts of Asia, Africa and Latin America, it works as a low-cost alternative to timber and steel for certain structures. Bamboo, like wood, is a natural composite material with a high strength-to-weight ratio useful for structures. Bamboo's strength-to-weight ratio is similar to timber, and its strength is generally similar to a strong softwood or hardwood timber.

== Physical Structure and Mechanical Properties ==
Bamboo is made of cellulose fibers that can be classified into three types of tissues: epidermal, vascular, and ground. The epidermal layer is the thick tissue on the outside of the bamboo, the vascular tissue provides longitudinal support, and the remaining areas are ground tissue. The fiber is densest at the surface and becomes less dense towards the center of the culm. Similar to wood products, bamboo is orthotropic, where its strength is dependent on the fiber direction.

Bamboo exhibits complex energy dissipation processes under flexural failure that increases its tolerance to damage. These processes include crack-deflection, fiber debonding, and crack bridging, displaying interfacial delamination similar to that of fiber-reinforced composites and laminates. However, the fracture toughness of bamboo, in addition to the strength and elastic modulus, degrade over time.

== Historic use of bamboo for construction ==
In its natural form, bamboo as a construction material is traditionally associated with the cultures of South Asia, East Asia, the South Pacific, and Central and South America. In China and India, bamboo was used to hold up simple suspension bridges, either by making cables of split bamboo or twisting whole culms of sufficiently pliable bamboo together. One such bridge in the area of Qian-Xian is referenced in writings dating back to 960 AD and may have stood since as far back as the third century BC, due largely to continuous maintenance.

Bamboo has also long been used as scaffolding; the practice has been banned in mainland China for buildings over six stories, but is still in continuous use for skyscrapers in Hong Kong.

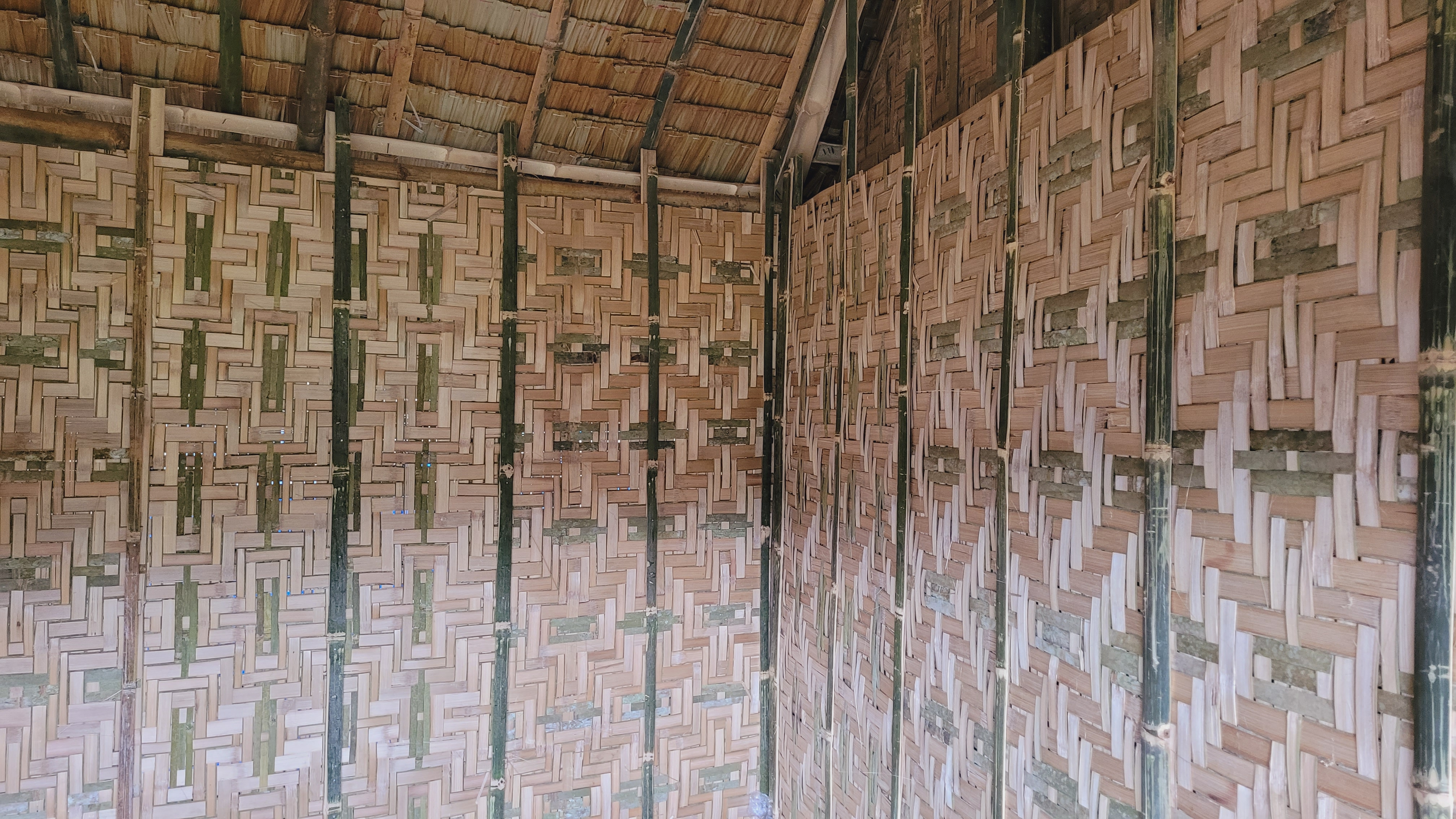
Amakan walls in the Philippines, a traditional panel made from split and woven bamboo

In the Philippines, the bahay kubo (also known as the "nipa hut") is a fairly typical example of traditional housing where bamboo is extensively used; the walls are split and woven bamboo known as amakan, bamboo poles may be used as structural posts and beams, the flooring can be made from split bamboo planks (overlaid with woven banig mats), and the roof can be made from halved bamboo sections known as kalaka. Many of these elements are deliberately light and permeable, allowing air to enter and circulate. Traditionally, bamboo structures in the Philippines are put together without nails, relying on fitted joints and bamboo pegs.

In Japanese architecture, bamboo is used primarily as a supplemental and/or decorative element in buildings such as fencing, fountains, grates and gutters, largely due to the ready abundance of quality timber.

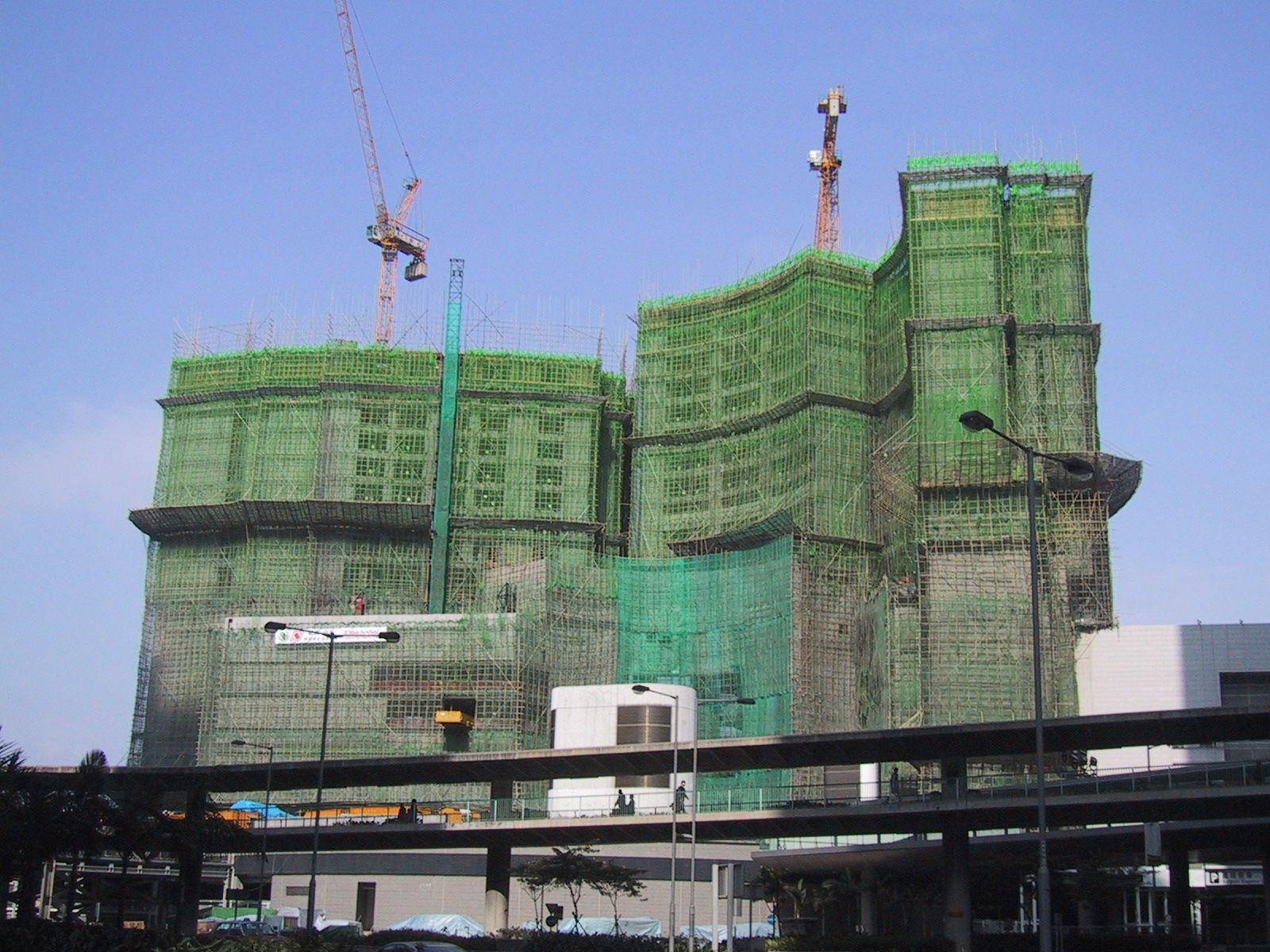
Bamboo scaffolding can reach great heights.

In parts of India, bamboo is used for drying clothes indoors, both as a rod high up near the ceiling to hang clothes on, and as a stick wielded with acquired expert skill to hoist, spread, and to take down the clothes when dry. It is also commonly used to make ladders, which apart from their normal function, are also used for carrying bodies in funerals. In Maharashtra, the bamboo groves and forests are called Veluvana, the name velu for bamboo is most likely from Sanskrit, while vana means forest. Furthermore, bamboo is also used to create flagpoles.

In Central and South America, bamboo has formed an essential part of the construction culture. Vernacular forms of housing such as bahareque have developed that use bamboo in highly seismic areas. When well-maintained and in good condition, these have been found to perform surprisingly well in earthquakes.

== Modern use of bamboo round poles for construction ==
Over the past few decades, there has been a growing interest in using bamboo round poles for construction, primarily because of its sustainability. Famous bamboo architects and builders include Simón Velez, Marcelo Villegas, Oscar Hidalgo-López, Jörg Stamm, Vo Trong Nghia, Elora Hardy and John Hardy. To date, the most high-profile bamboo construction projects have tended to be in Vietnam, Bali (Indonesia), China and Colombia. The greatest advancements in structural use of bamboo have been in Colombia, where Universities have been conducting significant research into element and joint design and large high-profile buildings and bridges have been constructed. In Brazil, bamboo have been studied for more than 40 years at the Pontifical Catholic University of Rio de Janeiro PUC-Rio for structural applications. Some important results are the tensegrity bamboo structures, the bamboo bicycles, the bamboo space structure with rigid steel joints, the deployable bamboo structure pavilions with flexible joints and the bamboo active bending-pantographic amphitheater structure developed by Bambutec Design company.

=== Structural design codes ===
The first structural design codes for bamboo in-the-round were published by ISO in 2004 (ISO 22156 Bamboo - structural design, ISO 22157-1 Bamboo – Determination of Physical and Mechanical properties part 1 and ISO 22157-2 Bamboo – Determination of Physical and Mechanical properties part 2: Laboratory manual. Colombia was the first country to publish a country-specific code in the structural use of bamboo (NSR-10 G12). Since then, Ecuador, Peru, India and Bangladesh have all published codes, however the Colombian code is still widely considered to be the most reliable and comprehensive.

=== Curved structural shapes ===
Heat and pressure is sometimes traditionally used to form curved shapes in bamboo. Bamboo has a significantly higher flexural ductility and better strength properties than wood, however, it has moderately lower elasticity. These properties suggest that bamboo can withstand greater deformation before failure, although its lower elasticity may influence its ability to maintain permanent curved shapes.

One strategy used to avoid the physical stressors and financial demands associated with the typical curving process for laminated bamboo beams, is deforming the bamboo during the cultivation process. Cultural deformation of the bamboo involves guiding a growing shoot into a metal or wooden frame for it to adopt the desired permanent curved shape. Studies on culturally preformed Bayog bamboo showed that curved culms retain strong mechanical properties suitable for structural uses such as arches and trusses.

=== Durability ===
Bamboo is more susceptible to decay than timber, due to its thin walls and lack of natural toxins, which means that a small amount of decay can result in a significant percentage change in capacity. There are three causes of decay: beetle attack, termite attack and fungal attack (rot). Untreated bamboo can last 2–6 years internally, and less than a year if exposed to water.

In order to protect bamboo from decay, two design principles are required:

1. The bamboo must be kept dry throughout its life to protect it against rot (fungi). This fundamental architectural principle is called "durability by design", and involves keeping the bamboo dry through good design practices such as elevating the structure above the ground, using damp proof membranes, having good drip details, having good roof overhangs, using waterproof coatings for the walls, etc.
2. The bamboo must be treated to protect it against insects (namely beetles and termites). The most common and appropriate chemical to treat bamboo is boron, normally either a mixture of borax and boric acid, but it also comes in one compound (di-sodium tetraborate decahydrate).

Both principles must be applied to a design in order to protect bamboo. Boron by itself is inadequate to protect against rot, and it will wash out if exposed to water.

Modern fixed preservatives may be used as alternatives to boron such as copper azole, however little bamboo has been reliably tested using these methods to date. In addition, they tend to be more hazardous for the treatment workers and the end user, and therefore are less appropriate for developing countries, which is where bamboo is currently mostly used.

Natural forms of bamboo treatment such as soaking in water and exposing to smoke may provide some limited protection against beetles, however, there is little evidence to show they are effective against termites and rot, and are therefore not typically used in modern construction.

=== Modern use of laminated bamboo for construction ===
Bamboo can be cut and laminated into sheets and planks. This process involves cutting stalks into thin strips, planing them flat, and drying the strips; they are then glued, pressed and finished. Long used in China and Japan, entrepreneurs started developing and selling laminated bamboo flooring in the West during the mid-1990s; products made from bamboo laminate, including flooring, cabinetry, furniture and even decorations, are currently surging in popularity, transitioning from the boutique market to mainstream providers such as Home Depot. The bamboo goods industry (which also includes small goods, fabric, etc.) is expected to be worth $25 billion by 2012. The quality of bamboo laminate varies among manufacturers and varies according to the maturity of the plant from which it was harvested (six years being considered the optimum).

== Case studies ==
Bamboo was used for the structural members of the India pavilion at Expo 2010 in Shanghai. The pavilion is the world's largest bamboo dome, about 34 m (112 ft) in diameter, with bamboo beams/members overlaid with a ferro-concrete slab, waterproofing, copper plate, solar PV panels, a small windmill, and live plants. A total of 30 km (19 mi) of bamboo was used. The dome is supported on 18-m-long steel piles and a series of steel ring beams. The bamboo was treated with borax and boric acid as a fire retardant and insecticide and bent in the required shape. The bamboo sections were joined with reinforcement bars and concrete mortar to achieve the necessary lengths.

Bamboo has been used successfully for housing in Costa Rica, Ecuador, El Salvador, Colombia, Mexico, Nepal and the Philippines. An appropriate way of using bamboo for housing is considered to be "bahareque encemendato", or "improved bahareque"/"engineered bahareque". This method takes the Latin America vernacular construction system bahareque (a derivative of wattle and daub) and engineers it, making it considerably more durable and resistant to earthquakes and typhoons.

Panyaden International School in northern Thailand expanded its campus with a bamboo sports hall designed by Chiangmai Life Architects. Inspired by the lotus flower, the hall spans 782 square meters and includes courts for various sports and a liftable stage. The innovative design uses prefabricated bamboo trusses spanning over 17 meters, ensuring the structure can withstand high-speed winds and earthquakes. The hall's natural ventilation and insulation provide year-round comfort, while its use of bamboo maintains a zero-carbon footprint.

Bamboo is one of the primary materials for the flood resistant homes in Pakistan designed by Yasmeen Lari. The technique is derived from the vernacular tradition of Sindh. It uses bamboo and mud brick.

== Cultivation ==
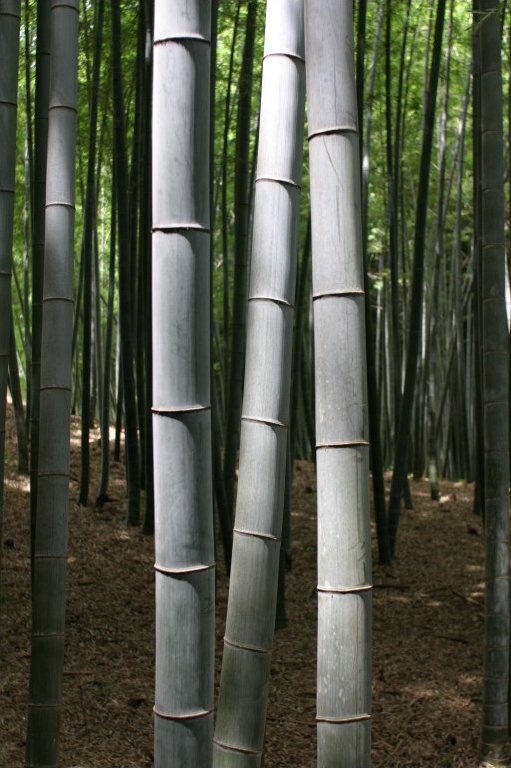
Bamboo forest in Kyoto, Japan

=== Harvesting ===
Bamboo used for construction purposes must be harvested when the culms reach their greatest strength and when sugar levels in the sap are at their lowest, as high sugar content increases the ease and rate of pest infestation.

Harvesting of bamboo is typically undertaken according to the following cycles:

Life cycle of the culm
As each individual culm goes through a 5–7 year life cycle, culms are ideally allowed to reach this level of maturity prior to full capacity harvesting. The clearing out or thinning of culms, particularly older decaying culms, helps to ensure adequate light and resources for new growth. Well-maintained clumps may have a productivity 3–4× that of an unharvested wild clump. Consistent with the life cycle described above, bamboo is harvested from two to three years through to five to seven years, depending on the species.
Annual cycle
As all growth of new bamboo occurs during the wet season, disturbing the clump during this phase will potentially damage the upcoming crop. Also during this high rainfall period, sap levels are at their highest, and then diminish towards the dry season. Picking immediately prior to the wet/growth season may also damage new shoots. Hence, harvesting is best a few months prior to the start of the wet season.
Daily cycle
During the height of the day, photosynthesis is at its peak, producing the highest levels of sugar in sap, making this the least ideal time of day to harvest. Many traditional practitioners believe the best time to harvest is at dawn or dusk on a waning moon.

== Additional images ==
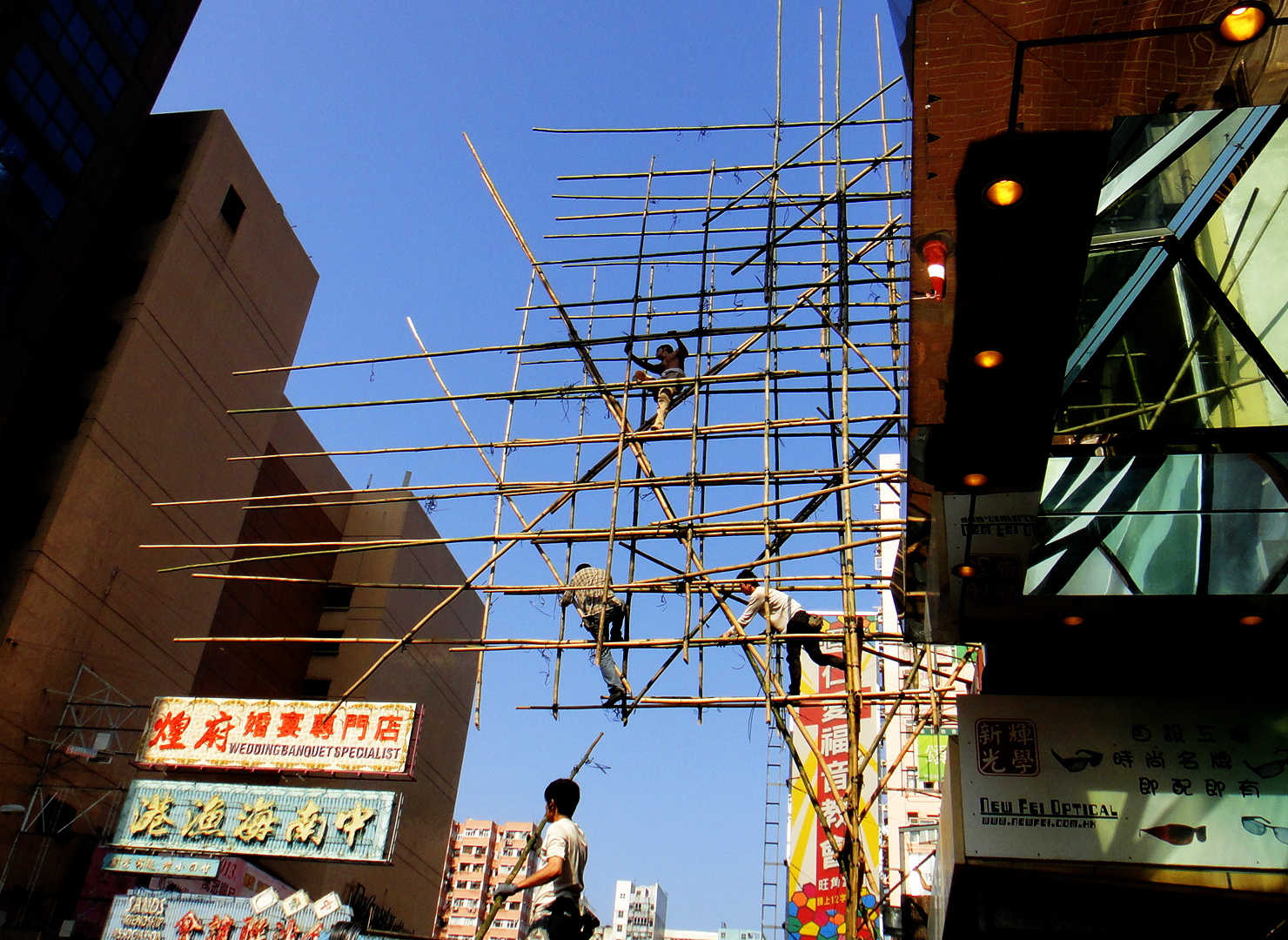
Bamboo has long been used as an assembly material in Hong Kong because of its versatility

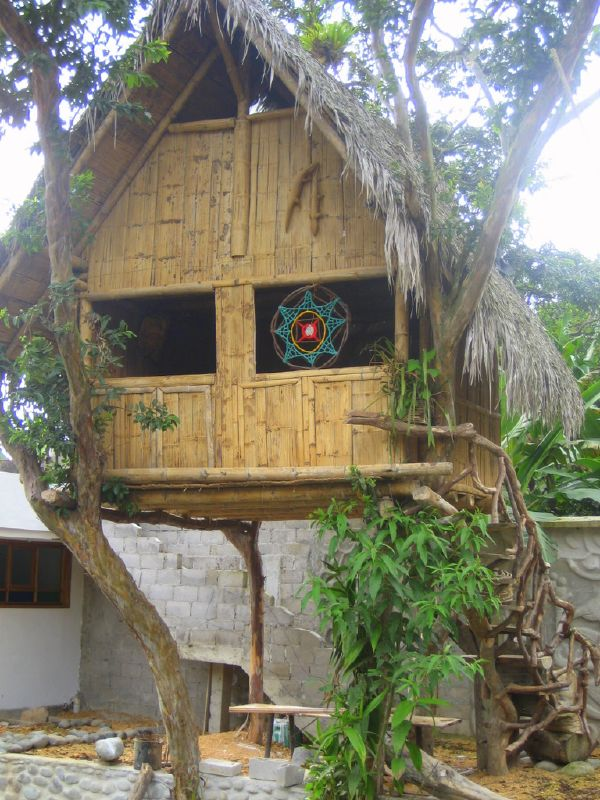
A bamboo and palm thatch house in Ecuador

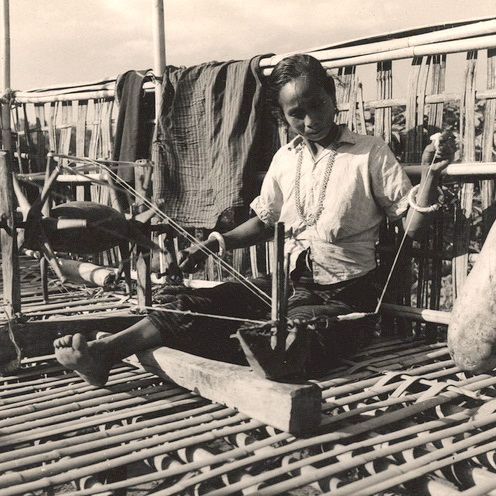
Chakma woman weaving on balcony of bamboo house, Chittagong Hill Tracts

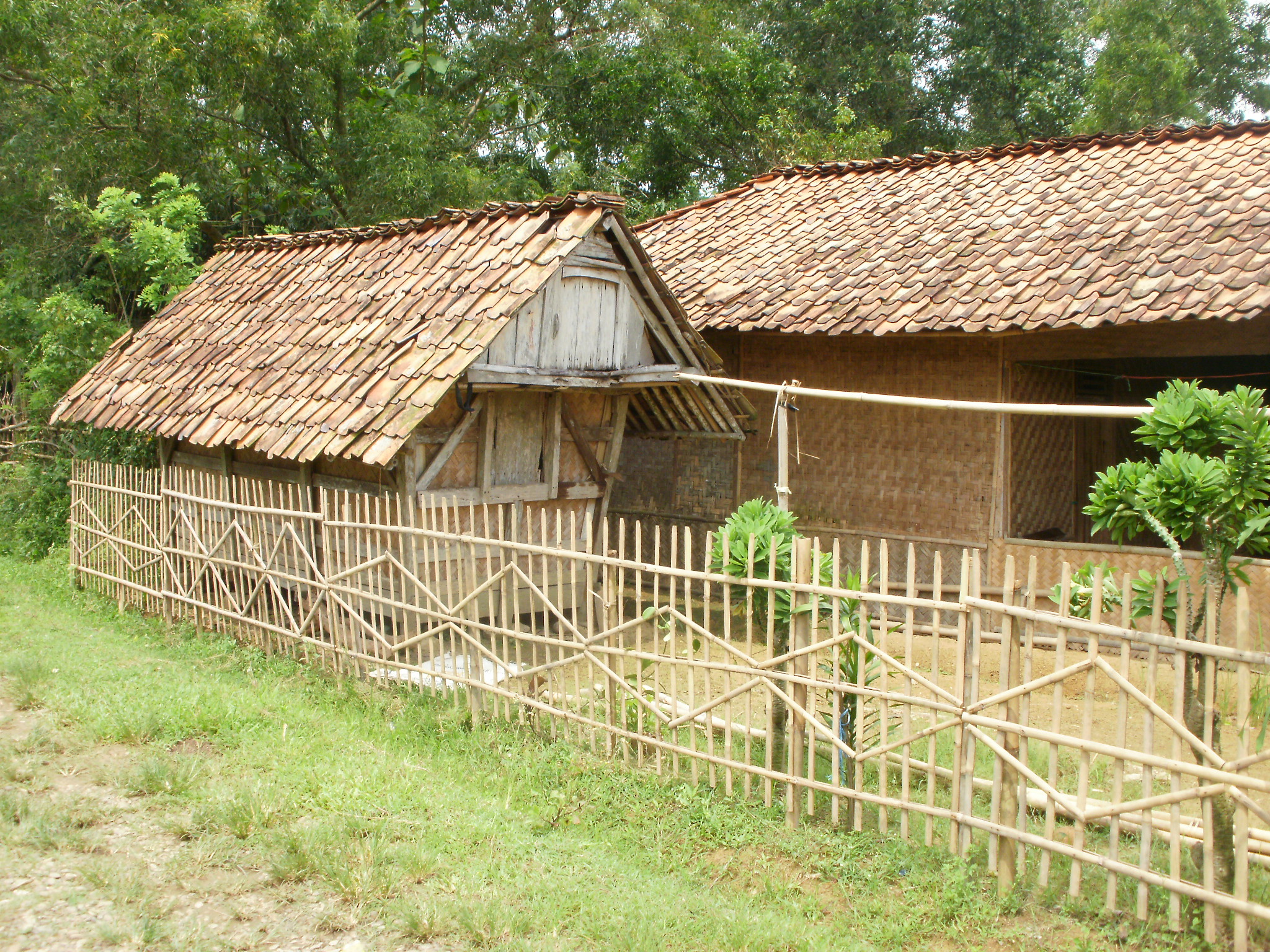
A bamboo house in Indonesia

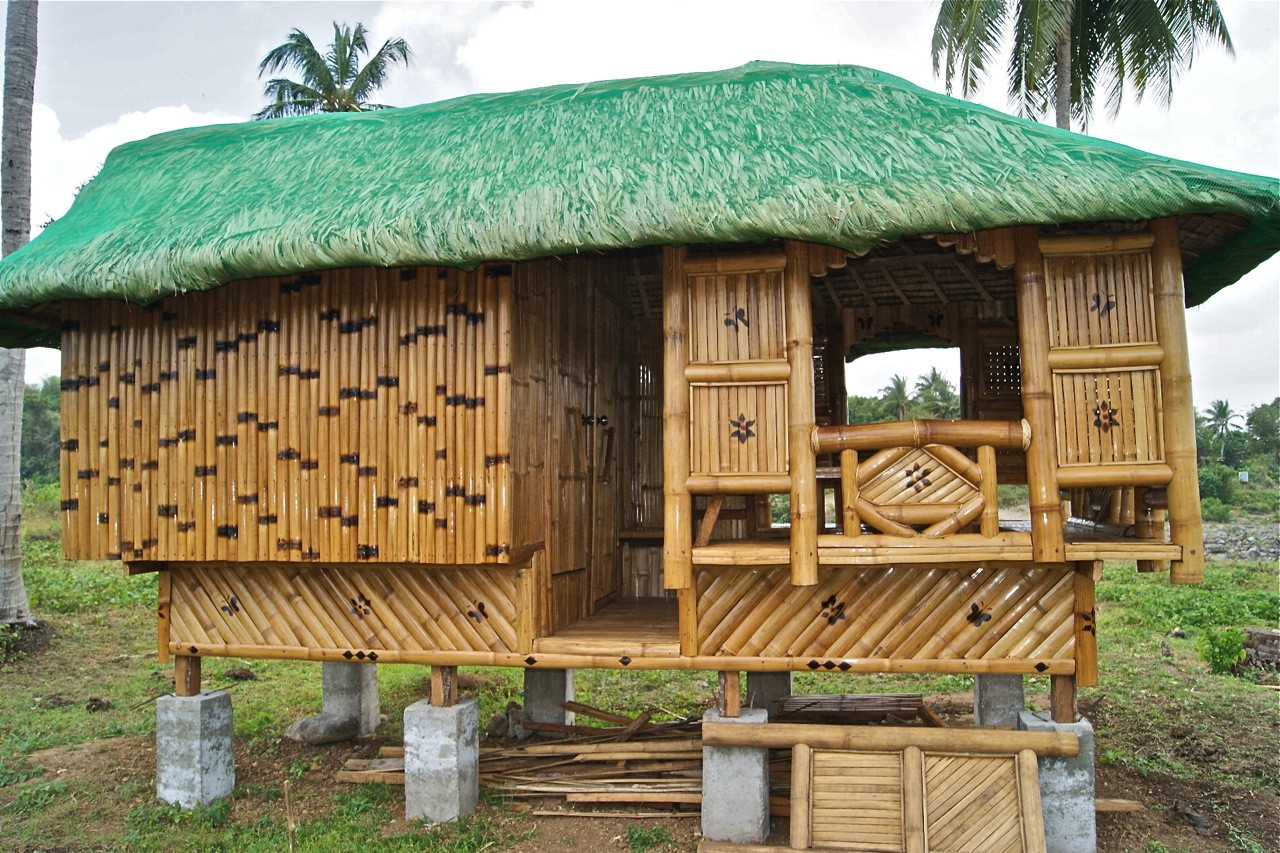
A nipa hut or bahay kubo is a type of stilt house in the Philippines

A bamboo bridge in Indonesia that serves as the link between the Outer Baduy and the Inner Baduy.

== See also ==
- Bamboo bicycle
- Bamboo textiles
- International Network for Bamboo and Rattan
