= Environmental Bamboo Foundation =

Indonesian Environmental NGO

- Formation: January 1993; 33 years ago
- Founder: Linda Garland
- Type: Nonprofit organization
- Purpose: Promoting sustainable use of bamboo
- Headquarters: Gianyar, Bali, Indonesia
- Region served: Indonesia
- Leader: Arief Rabik
- Website: Official Website

The Environmental Bamboo Foundation (Indonesian: Yayasan Bambu Lestari) is an Indonesian nonprofit organization involved in sustainable forestry management, specifically by using local bamboo plantations as a way to preserve tropical forest resources. The organization has partnerships with numerous civil and academic institutions as well as government institutions including the Indonesian Ministry of Environment and Forestry. A manufacturing company, Indobamboo (Indonesian: Indobamboo Lestari), was set up to oversee the production of bamboo products stemming from the organization's activities. The organization has been represented at recent climate conferences, notably including recent United Nations COP conferences COP21, COP23, and COP26. In 2021, the foundation's manufacturing company Indobamboo secured a €350,000 grant from the Dutch Fund for Climate and Development (DFCD) and WWF to set up a bamboo manufacturing factory in Flores, Indonesia.

== History ==
The Environmental Bamboo Foundation was founded in 1993 by Linda Garland, an interior designer and environmentalist who was recognized as a 'Bamboo Pioneer' by the World Bamboo Organization for her contribution to the use of bamboo in design and work in environmental conservation.

== Notable initiatives and programs ==
=== Pre-2015 initiatives ===
The Environmental Bamboo Foundation has had numerous partnerships with public, private and academic institutions since its foundation. In the late 90s, it partnered with the Rhode Island School of Design on exploring sustainable and innovative applications of bamboo in architecture. In 1995 it was the host of the 4th International Bamboo Congress and 5th International Bamboo Workshop in Bali, a conference organized by the International Bamboo and Rattan Organisation to present scientific findings and promote discussion around the use of bamboo.

=== Vertical soak diffusion method ===
The Environmental Bamboo Foundation is credited with developing a method for bamboo treatment known as vertical soak diffusion method, where a solution of borax, boric acid and water is poured into harvested bamboo culms to protect it from insect and fungal attack.

=== 1,000 bamboo villages ===
The 1,000 bamboo villages project was announced by Arief Rabik at the COP21. As part of the project, degraded land is being converted into productive bamboo plantations which are independently managed by local communities. The bamboo is then used to manufacture products like bamboo laminates, textiles, paper and pulp which can be sold at a profit on the global market.
