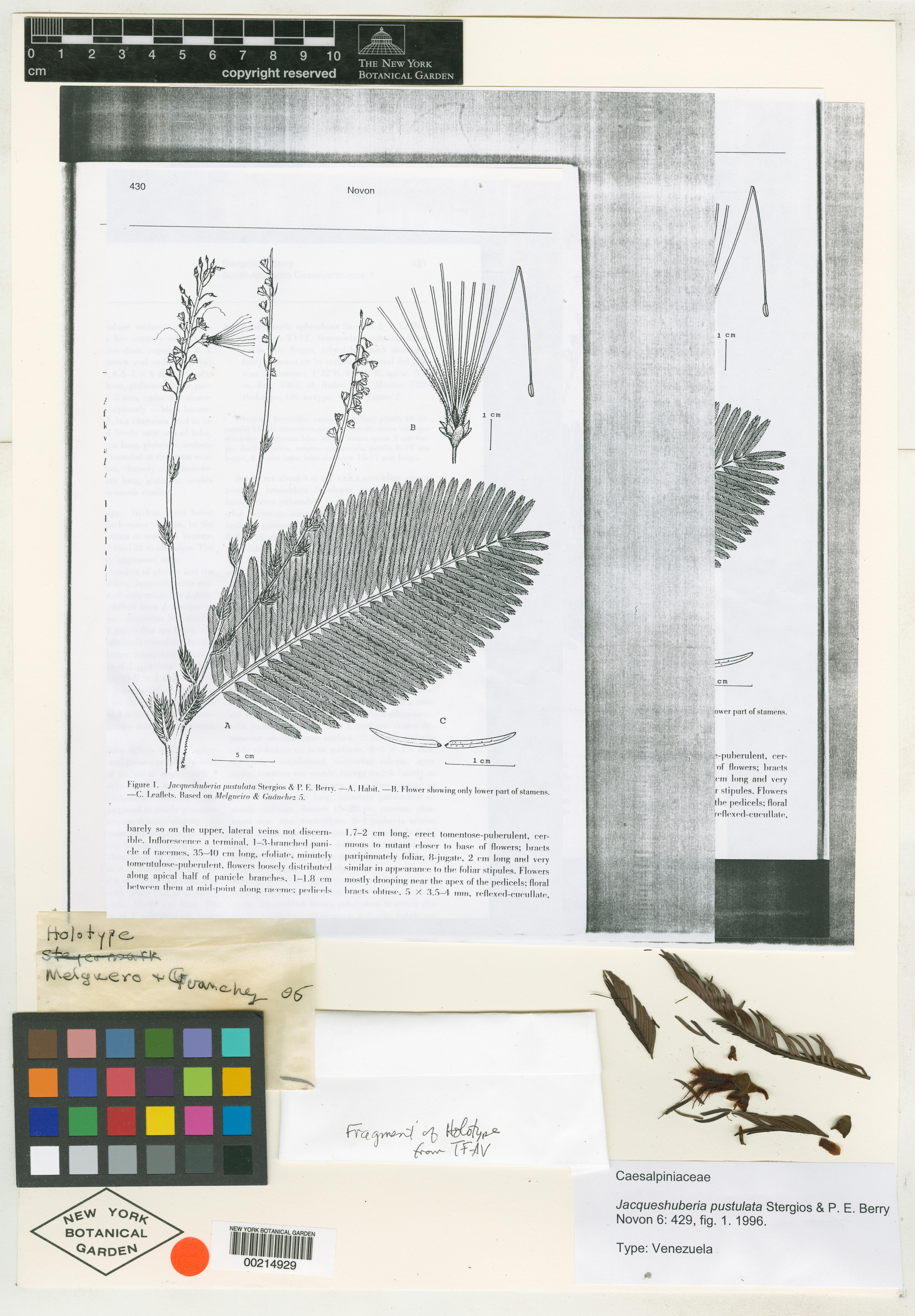

Scientific classification
- Kingdom: Plantae
- Clade: Tracheophytes
- Clade: Angiosperms
- Clade: Eudicots
- Clade: Rosids
- Order: Fabales
- Family: Fabaceae
- Subfamily: Caesalpinioideae
- Genus: Jacqueshuberia
- Species: J. pustulata

Binomial name
- Jacqueshuberia pustulata Stergios & P.E. Berry

= Jacqueshuberia pustulata =

Species of legume

Jacqueshuberia pustulata is a plant species endemic to Venezuela. It is known only from a single location along a blackwater stream in the State of Amazonas at an elevations of about 115 m.

Jacqueshuberia pustulata is a tree up to 5 m tall. Stipules are compound, with up to 20 pairs of leaflet-like lobes, each up to 9 mm long. Leaves are bipinnately compound, up to 40 cm long, with 24-28 pairs of pinnae, each pinna with 50-70 pairs of leaflets, each leaflet about 10 mm long with conspicuous pustules along the veins on the upper side. Inflorescence is a panicle of racemes, with many small yellow flowers.
