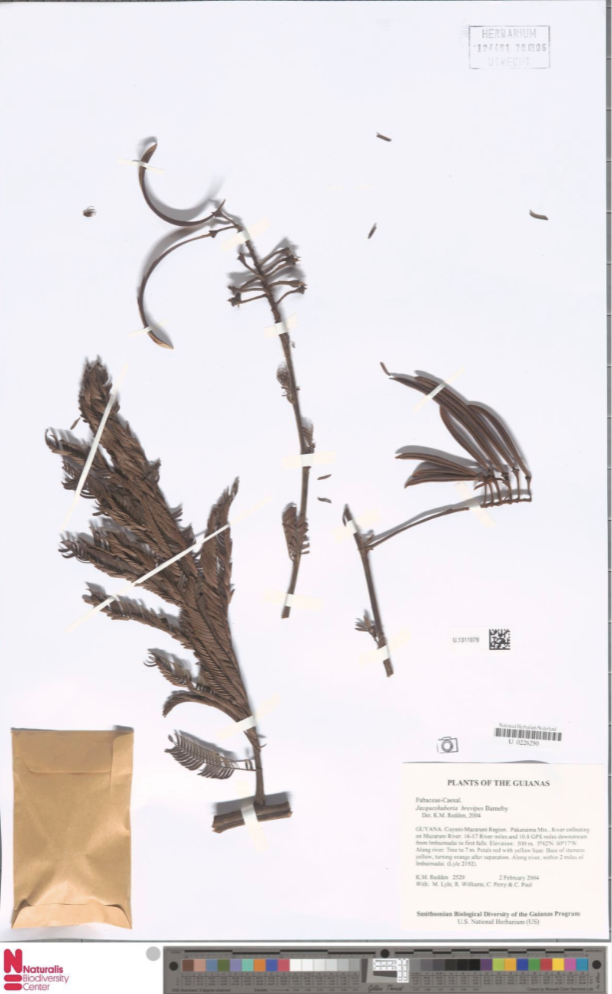
- Jacqueshuberia brevipes

Scientific classification
- Kingdom: Plantae
- Clade: Embryophytes
- Clade: Tracheophytes
- Clade: Spermatophytes
- Clade: Angiosperms
- Clade: Eudicots
- Clade: Rosids
- Order: Fabales
- Family: Fabaceae
- Subfamily: Caesalpinioideae
- Tribe: Caesalpinieae
- Genus: Jacqueshuberia; Ducke (1922)

= Jacqueshuberia =

Genus of legumes

Jacqueshuberia is a genus of legume in the family Fabaceae, including seven species native to northern South America, from Colombia, Venezuela and Guyana to northern Brazil and Peru.

- Jacqueshuberia amplifolia R.S.Cowan
- Jacqueshuberia brevipes Barneby
- Jacqueshuberia loretensis R.S.Cowan
- Jacqueshuberia purpurea Ducke
- Jacqueshuberia pustulata Stergios & P.E.Berry
- Jacqueshuberia quinquangulata Ducke
- Jacqueshuberia splendens Stergios & P.E.Berry
