= Guadua amplexifolia =

Scientific classification
- Kingdom: Plantae
- Clade: Tracheophytes
- Clade: Angiosperms
- Clade: Monocots
- Clade: Commelinids
- Order: Poales
- Family: Poaceae
- Genus: Guadua
- Species: G. amplexifolia

Binomial name
- Guadua amplexifolia J. Presl

Species of grass

Guadua amplexifolia is a species of clumping bamboo native to Mexico, Panama, Costa Rica, Nicaragua, Colombia, and Venezuela.

This bamboo is used for construction.
