= Elora Hardy =

Canadian designer (born 1980)

Elora Hardy (born 1980) is a Canadian designer, who founded the company Ibuku. She is known for designing (along with her team Ibuku and her father John Hardy) a community of bamboo homes near Denpasar in Bali. She was born in Canada, grew up in Bali and moved to the United States at the age of 14 to go to boarding school. She then got a degree in fine arts and worked in the fashion industry where she most notably designed prints for Donna Karan. In 2010, Hardy moved back to Bali and founded Ibuku, a design firm that uses bamboo and other natural materials to build homes and structures. Since that time Ibuku has built more than 90 bamboo structures in Southeast Asia and Africa, including the Green School Bali campus. Hardy created a yoga pavilion and riverside cooking classroom at the Four Seasons in Bali, the interior design of Tri restaurant in Hong Kong, furniture for the Como Marketplace in Singapore and tree-house suites at Bambu Indah.

For her work on bamboo buildings, Hardy was named an Architectural Digest Innovator in 2013. In 2015 she gave a TED Talk about her building projects titled “Magical houses, made of bamboo”.

== Biography ==
Elora Hardy was born in 1980 in Canada to artistic parents Penny Berton and John Hardy. They settled in Bali, Indonesia in the 1970s and Elora grew up and was surrounded with craftsmen and women from the village and other areas surrounding it. She was taught by these craftsmen and women how to carve, paint, and batik, an Indonesian style of dyeing whole cloths that is wax resistant. Her childhood creations consisted primarily of princesses and fairies, and she was also given the freedom to design and decorate her own room. When her mother asked her to draw her dream house, she drew a fairy house that looked more like a mushroom that had windows and a door built onto it.

Hardy's mother Penny Berton was a jewelry designer who worked with local goldsmiths to create hand-carved artworks. Hardy's grandfather was Canadian author Pierre Berton. In the 1990s her father, John Hardy, along with his second wife Cynthia Hardy founded a successful international jewelry company John Hardy.

During her young adult life, Hardy moved to the United States and spent 14 years living there. She first lived in California at Idyllwild Arts Academy, a boarding school for the arts. Later, she earned her Bachelor of Fine Arts at Tufts University in 2004. The following year, Hardy moved to Manhattan, New York where she found her way into becoming a print designer at the Donna Karan Collection and subsequently the famous DKNY brand. She spent five years in New York painting on fabric and in computer graphics creating the prints and graphics, and though she loved New York, her drive to make a difference ecologically kept drawing her back to Asia.

When her father and stepmother sold their shares in their jewelry design company, they began to focus on building and designing an eco-conscious school in Bali. By 2008 the Green School was open for students to enroll, and its attraction soon extended beyond Indonesia. In 2010, Hardy decided to move back to Indonesia to join her father and a group of artisans and home designers to build bamboo houses. The demand for environmentally friendly homes grew so much that her father found it as an opportunity to put his skills and ideas into action. The same group of artisans and home designers were those who helped build the Green School.

== Building with bamboo ==
Since the early 2000s, John Hardy has been experimenting with bamboo-use in buildings in order to build eco-friendly homes. He was inspired by Linda Garland who helped develop the use of bamboo in the modern world. Instead of succumbing to the anxiety that comes with climate change, he, along with his wife, decided that they would overcome it by creating a world more sustainable and better for the environment. Bamboo grew sustainably on land and was not fit as food for crops. When treated properly, it can last for decades and when not needed, may be brought back into nature without harming it. They developed a plan to use bamboo in their designs and included Elora in their project as well. Their designs made with bamboo were done so in order to create “beautiful curves that created comfy spaces.”

Through the creation of the Green School, Hardy founded Ibuku, a company of craftsmen, architects and designers who build houses and design items made exclusively out of bamboo. “IBU-” meant ‘mother’ and “-KU” meant ‘me’; Ibuku means my mother nature. Hardy found that there was potential in bamboo as material for building due to its ecological durability and extreme strength in many ways. She emphasizes how it would mean that every step of treating the bamboo must be done carefully and every aspect of its use into the design must be considered in order to maintain its durability and strength, extending the period of completing a project. After the completion of the Green School, Hardy and her Ibuku team worked on its next project: the Green Village. It was similar to the Green School where it was made exclusively out of bamboo. It was possible for use in the construction of large-span objects such as bridges, even more, it was much more profitable compared to using materials such as steel and aluminum. These qualities became even more evident in their work of the Sharma Springs Bamboo Trace House. Bamboo was becoming an alternative to the expensive materials in constructing buildings.

== See also ==
- Bamboo construction
- Sustainability
