= Guadua paraguayana =

Scientific classification
- Kingdom: Plantae
- Clade: Tracheophytes
- Clade: Angiosperms
- Clade: Monocots
- Clade: Commelinids
- Order: Poales
- Family: Poaceae
- Genus: Guadua
- Species: G. paraguayana

Binomial name
- Guadua paraguayana Döll

Species of grass

Guadua paraguayana is a species of clumping bamboo found in northern Argentina, Bolivia, Brazil, Paraguay and Venezuela.

This bamboo is used for posts, fences, flooring and decorative work.
