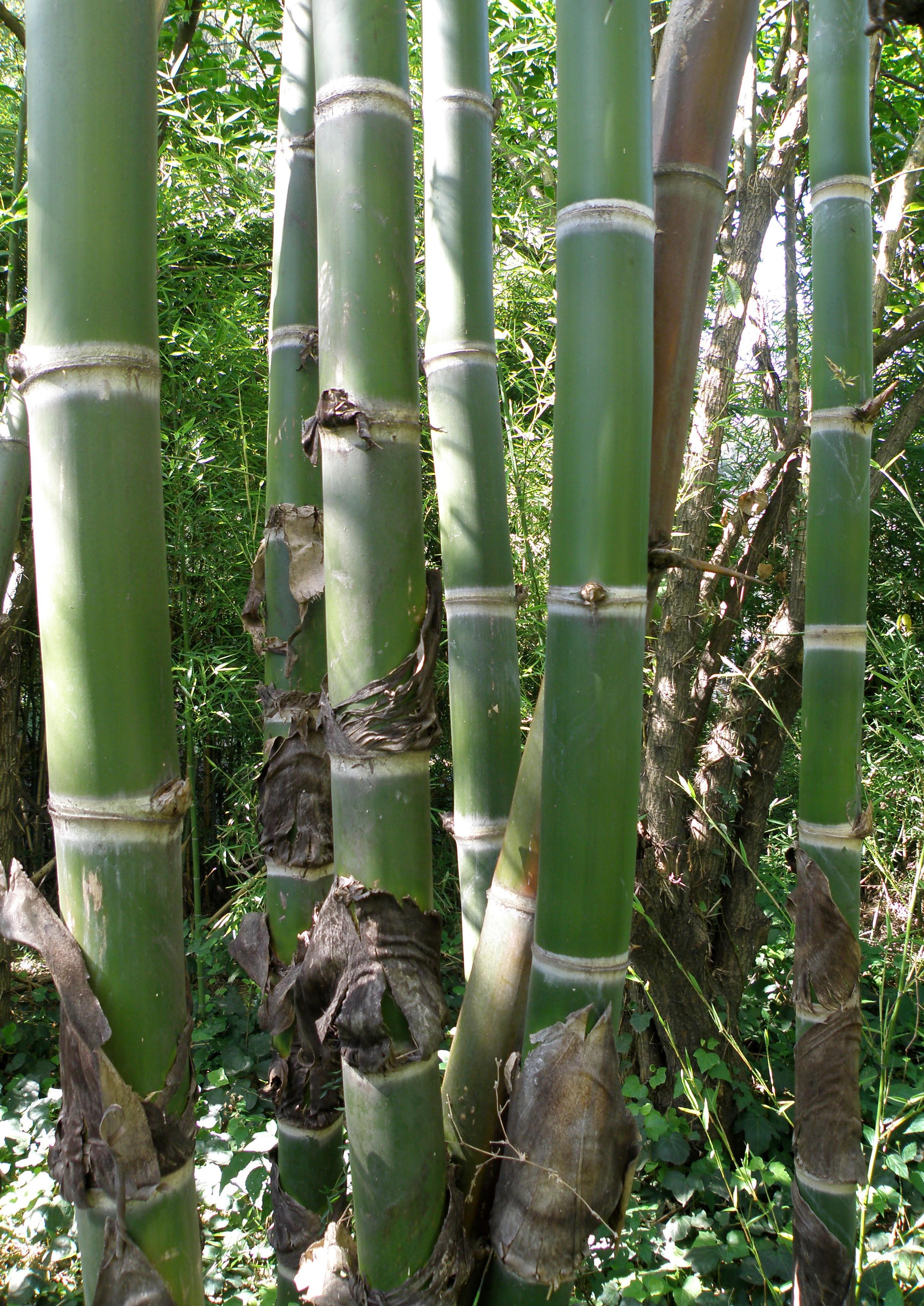

Scientific classification
- Kingdom: Plantae
- Clade: Embryophytes
- Clade: Tracheophytes
- Clade: Spermatophytes
- Clade: Angiosperms
- Clade: Monocots
- Clade: Commelinids
- Order: Poales
- Family: Poaceae
- Genus: Guadua
- Species: G. chacoensis

Binomial name
- Guadua chacoensis (Rojas Acosta) Londoño & P.M.Peterson

= Guadua chacoensis =

Species of grass

Guadua chacoensis is a species of clumping bamboo found in Argentina, Brazil, Bolivia, Paraguay, and Uruguay.
