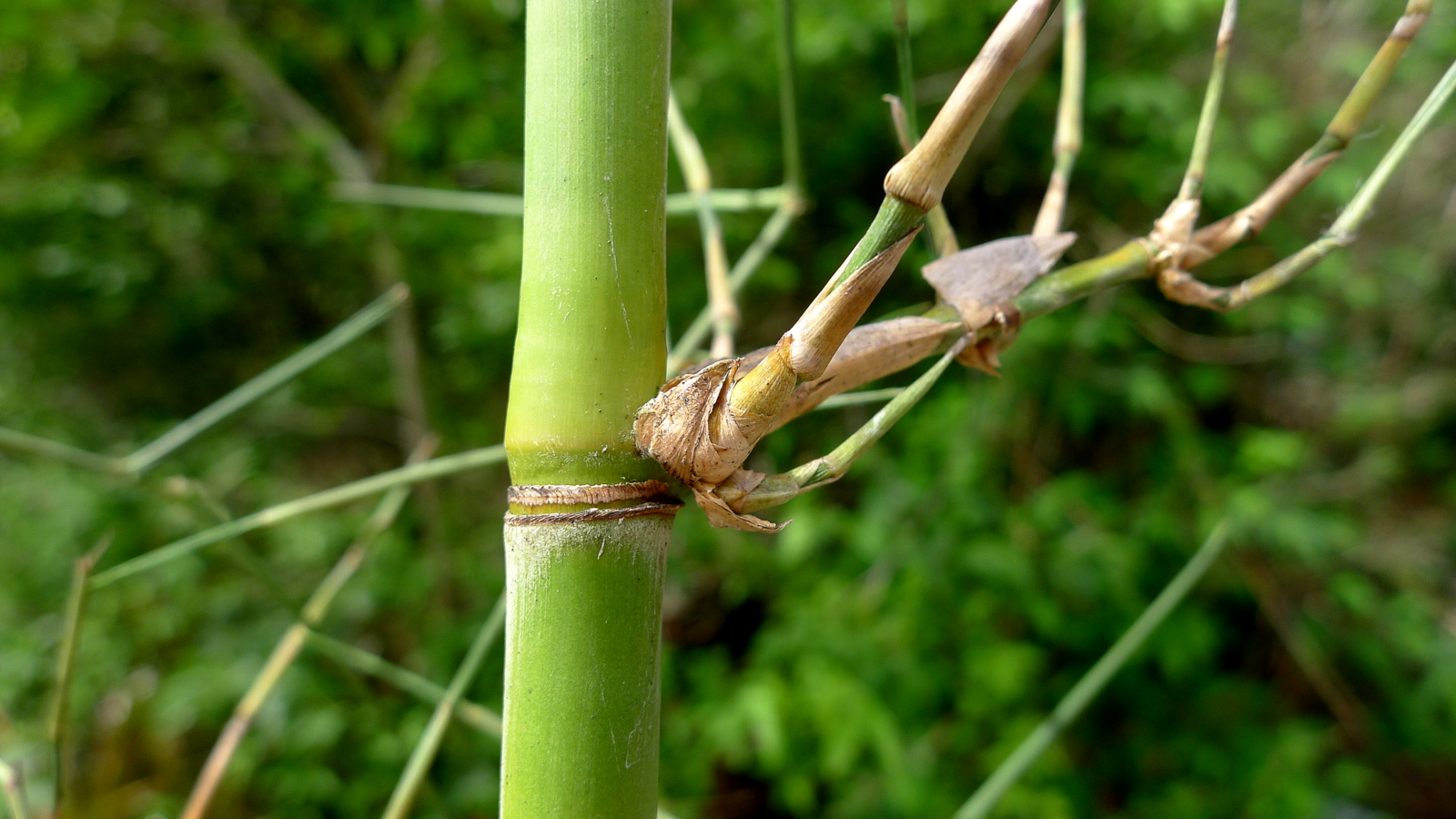

Scientific classification
- Kingdom: Plantae
- Clade: Tracheophytes
- Clade: Angiosperms
- Clade: Monocots
- Clade: Commelinids
- Order: Poales
- Family: Poaceae
- Genus: Guadua
- Species: G. paniculata

Binomial name
- Guadua paniculata Munro

= Guadua paniculata =

Species of grass

Guadua paniculata is a species of clumping bamboo found in Mexico, Panama and the tropical and sub-tropical parts of northern South America.

This bamboo is used for rustic construction, roofing and musical instruments.
