= Bahareque =

Traditional building technique in the Americas

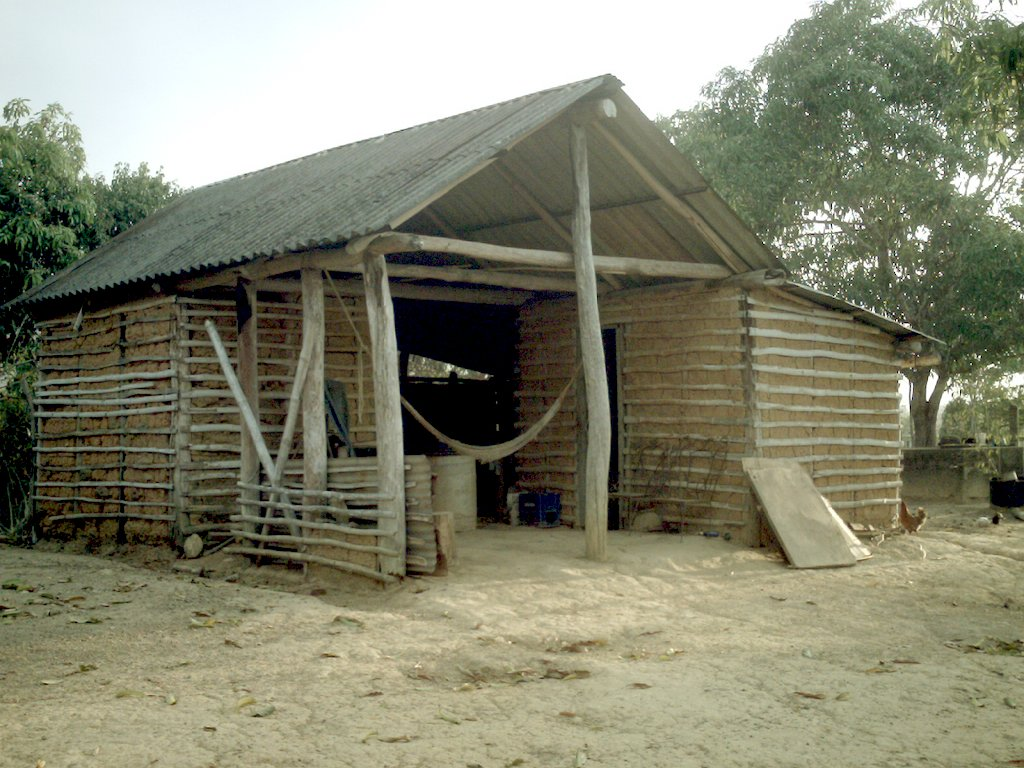
Bahareque llanos house from Venezuela

Bahareque, also spelled bareque (also referred to in Spanish as bajareque or fajina), is a traditional building technique used in the construction of housing by indigenous peoples. The constructions are developed using a system of interwoven sticks or reeds, with a covering of mud, similar to the systems of wattle and clay structures seen in Europe. This technique is primarily used in regions such as Caldas, which is one of the 32 departments of Colombia.

== Origin ==
Bahareque, is an ancient construction system used within the Americas. The name is said to come from the word bajareque, is an old Spanish term for walls made of bamboo (guadua in Spanish) and soil. Guadua is a common woody grass found in Colombia. While its exact origin is uncertain, some authors have also attributed it to Caribbean-Taino culture and written it as 'bajareque'. Similar homophonies are found in other native American languages such as Miteca, ba and balibi, bava.

Pedro José Ramírez Sendoya (1897-1966), a Colombian priest and anthropologist, mentioned its use in his writings, noting that it was used to construct "good buildings with walls of clay and wood almost as wide as one of our walls, tall and whitewashed with very white clay".

== Construction and materials ==
Based on Jorge Enrique Robledo's book, Muñoz points out that this traditional technique of building evolved in Caldas from the first buildings constructed during the 1840s through the introduction of new materials, creating different typologies. All of these typologies typically use stone foundations. These typologies are: 1. bahareque de tierra, 2. bahareque de tabla, 3. bahareque metálico, and 4. bahareque encementado. Each typology has a different structural design. For instance, bahareque de tierra uses bamboo in both the frame and the structural panels and the plaster, and according to Sarmiento, is made from a mixture of earth and cattle dung. Bahareque encementado uses wood in the frame and bamboo (guadua) in its structural panels, and the plaster is made by a kind of “reinforced cement” because of the use of steel mat between the bamboo panels and the cement plaster.

In the 1840s, the first settlers of Manizales, the capital city of Caldas, used bahareque de tierra in buildings that were usually single story. At the same time, in the rural areas, some farmers used a mix of traditional building styles. This mix of traditional styles was tapia, which is a pre-Hispanic construction technique, and bahareque. The first floor, tapia, was based on compacted earth using wood earth forms, and the second floor was bahareque. In 1993, Robledo called this variation estilo temblorero. The name derives from the fact that this new technique of bahareque had better performance in the earthquakes (Spanish sismo meaning 'earthquake') since the first floor, which was rigid, absorbed the seismic energy, and the second floor, which was flexible, dissipated the energy. Consequently, the estilo temblorero, which was used in a few farms and occasionally in the city of Manizales as temporary housing, gained favor after people saw that earthquakes were destroying buildings built with other construction techniques, such as tapia. Those built with Estilo Temblorero remained standing.

Because of the bahareque materials' flammability, and after the great fires of Manizales between 1925 and 1926, the trustworthiness of bahareque was lost. After these great fires and the introduction of new construction techniques, such as reinforced concrete, new variations of the bahareque technique were introduced, leaving more trust in reinforced concrete than bahareque. These new techniques, which used concrete frames and bahareque facades and structural panels, were the most common structural designs in the reconstruction of the downtown that was swept by the great fires.

== See also ==
- Adobe
- Wattle and daub

== Works cited ==
- Muñoz Robledo, José Fernando (2010). Tipificación de los sistemas constructivos patrimoniales de "Bahareque" en el paisaje cultural cafetero de Colombia (in Spanish). Manizales: National University of Colombia. ISBN 978-958-8280-40-0. OCLC 777071689.
- Muñoz Robledo, José Fernando (2007). Sistemas constructivos: arquitecturas de baja altura en Manizales (in Spanish). National University of Colombia. ISBN 978-958-761-794-8. OCLC 1261027520.
- Robledo, Jorge Enrique; Samper, Diego (1993). Un siglo de bahareque en el antiguo Caldas (in Spanish). Bogotá: El Ancora Editores. ISBN 978-958-9012-87-1. OCLC 30733482.
- Sarmiento Nova, Juan Manuel (2003). Manual de materiales y técnicas constructivas tradicionales (in Spanish). Manizales (Colombia); Coria: National University of Colombia. ISBN 978-84-923978-8-4. OCLC 1025998806.
