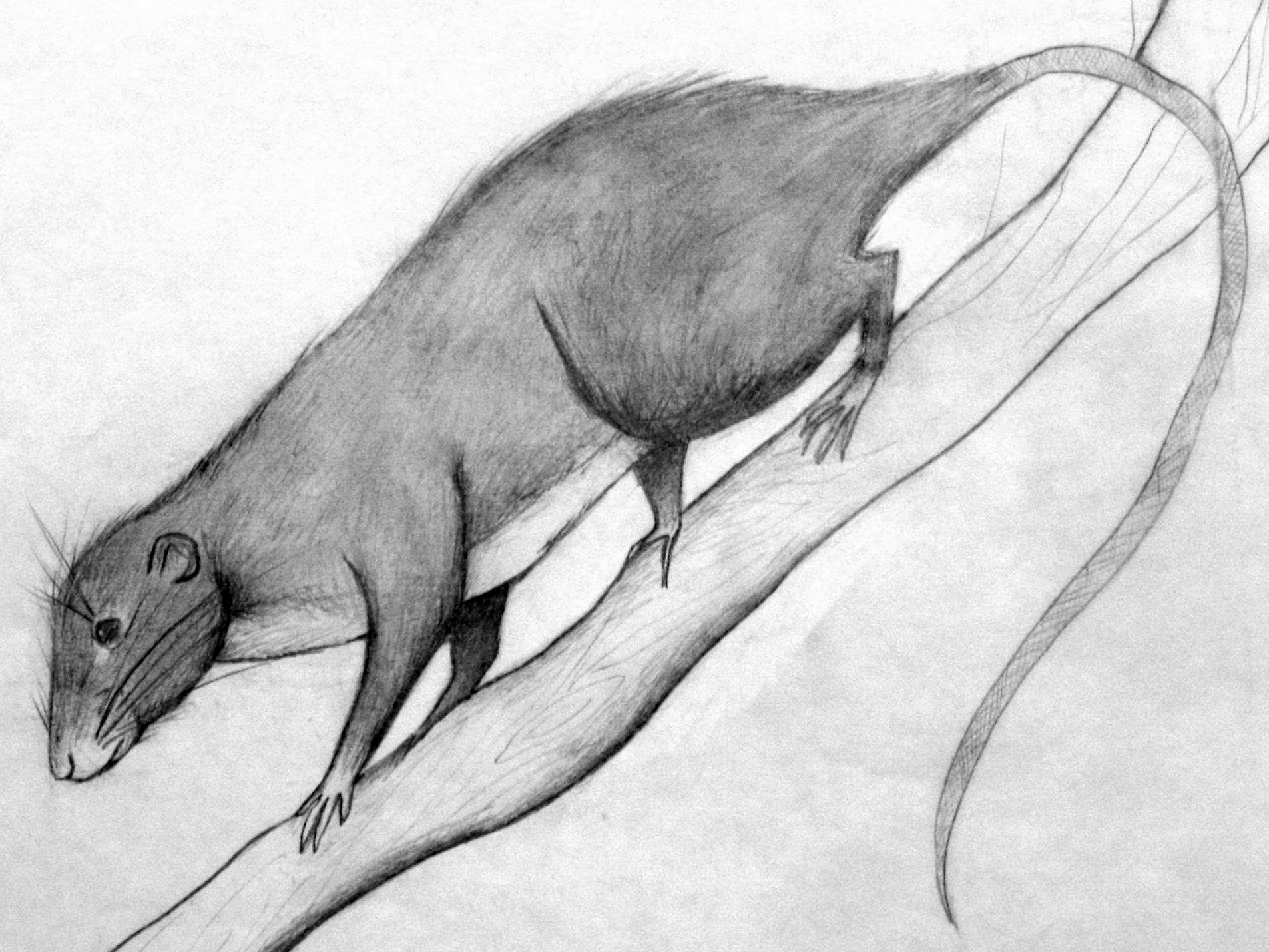

Conservation status
- Least Concern (IUCN 3.1)

Scientific classification
- Kingdom: Animalia
- Phylum: Chordata
- Class: Mammalia
- Order: Rodentia
- Family: Echimyidae
- Genus: Dactylomys
- Species: D. dactylinus

Binomial name
- Dactylomys dactylinus (Desmarest, 1817)

Subspecies
- Dactylomys dactylinus canescens (Thomas, 1912); Dactylomys dactylinus dactylinus (Desmarest, 1817); Dactylomys dactylinus modestus (Lönnberg, 1921)
- Amazon bamboo rat range

Audio
- Calls recorded at Tambopata Wildlife Reserve, Madre de Dios, Peru in September 1985

= Amazon bamboo rat =

Species of mammal belonging to the spiny rat family of rodents

The Amazon bamboo rat (Dactylomys dactylinus) is a species of spiny rat from the Amazon Basin of South America. It is also referred to as coro-coro, Toró, Rato-do-Bambú, or Rata del Bambú in different parts of its range. The bamboo rat prefers to reside in areas of dense vegetation, such as clumps of bamboo or in the canopy. It is an arboreal browser, consuming primarily leaves and spending much of its time off the ground. Because the Amazon bamboo rat spends most of its time in heavily forested areas, it is difficult to observe, and not much is known about its habits.

== Physical characteristics ==
The Amazon bamboo rat has a body length of over 60 centimetres (24 in) from the nose to the tip of the tail, and weighs approximately 600–750 grams (21–26 oz). The rat has a stout appearance, olive-grey fur streaked with black, and a tail with short, fine hairs. It has elongated digits, which are an adaptation for the rat's frequent need to climb, hence the species name: dactylinus derives from the ancient greek word δάκτυλος (dáktulos), meaning "finger". Its paws are covered with hundreds of bumps called tubercles to aid in climbing. Despite being nocturnal, the Amazon bamboo rat has weak eyeshine. The bamboo rat may benefit from weak eyeshine because it makes the rat more difficult to detect in the canopy, and because the rat moves so slowly that it does not require as much light. It has horizontally slit pupils, similar to those of a goat, to aid in its occasional diurnal activity. Like other arboreal browsers, the Amazon bamboo rat has scent glands which it uses to mark its territory.

== Behavior ==
Due to the restricted diet of arboreal folivores, many of them move slowly to avoid wasting energy. The Amazon bamboo rat's slow and cautious manner of climbing has the added effect of making its movements completely silent, helping to protect it from predators. Because the rat moves so slowly, its displacement may only reach 62 meters (about 203 feet) in a single night. If a bamboo rat is quietly approached, it will back away slowly and silently; however, the rat is capable of disappearing swiftly into the foliage if necessary. This behavior allows the rodent to minimize its energy usage.

=== Diet ===
The Amazon bamboo rat is a small folivore. It consumes only plants that are easily digested, in order to conserve energy. The bamboo rat primarily consumes young leaves, stems, and petioles. Because of its limited diet of bamboo and local vines, it is more abundant in regions of Latin America where its preferred food sources are plentiful.

=== Social ===
The Amazon bamboo rat is nocturnal, emitting its shrill cry throughout the night to communicate its presence to other bamboo rats. The bamboo rat's call consists of several explosive, low frequency pulses, as well as grunts of low amplitude, which may indicate alarm or serve to communicate with other rats. The Amazon bamboo rat has been observed to travel in pairs, commonly consisting of one male and one female. Because the bamboo rat has not been studied in great detail, not much is known regarding its mating habits. One female Amazon bamboo rat was collected in Brazil in June bearing two embryos, one of which had a crown-rump length of 97 millimetres (3.8 in).

== Distribution ==
The Amazon bamboo rat lives in dense rainforest vegetation. There is also a report of its presence in a gallery forest in the cerrado. It can be found in much of the Amazon Basin, in parts of Bolivia, Brazil, Colombia, Ecuador, and Peru.
