= Guadua sarcocarpa =

Scientific classification
- Kingdom: Plantae
- Clade: Tracheophytes
- Clade: Angiosperms
- Clade: Monocots
- Clade: Commelinids
- Order: Poales
- Family: Poaceae
- Genus: Guadua
- Species: G. sarcocarpa

Binomial name
- Guadua sarcocarpa Londoño & P.M.Peterson

Species of plant

Guadua sarcocarpa, also known as the fleshy fruit guadua, is a species of clumping bamboo found in Bolivia, Brazil, Ecuador, Peru, and Venezuela.

This bamboo is used for construction, ladders, fences, and digging sticks.
