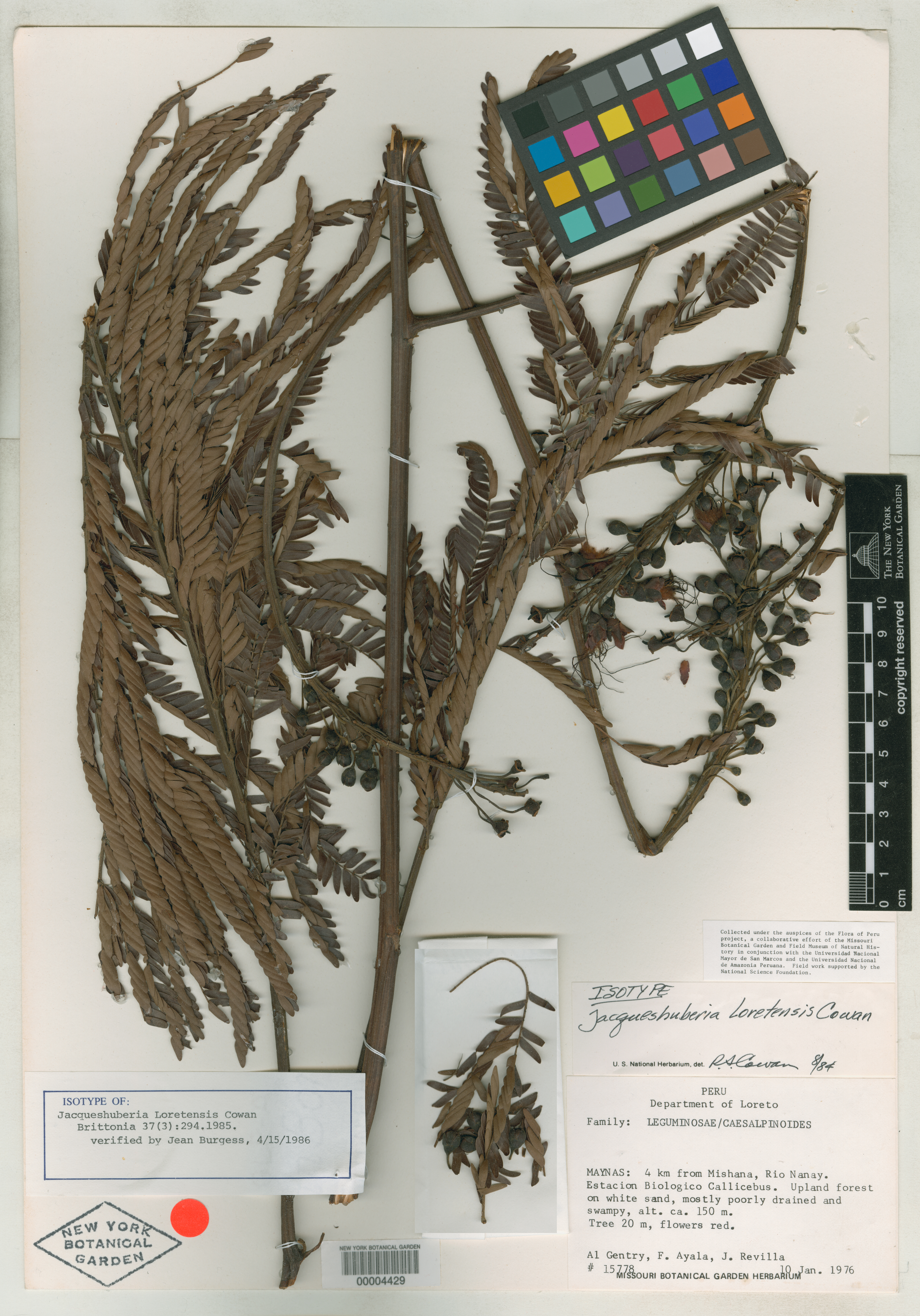

Conservation status
- Vulnerable (IUCN 2.3)

Scientific classification
- Kingdom: Plantae
- Clade: Tracheophytes
- Clade: Angiosperms
- Clade: Eudicots
- Clade: Rosids
- Order: Fabales
- Family: Fabaceae
- Subfamily: Caesalpinioideae
- Genus: Jacqueshuberia
- Species: J. loretensis

Binomial name
- Jacqueshuberia loretensis R.S.Cowan

= Jacqueshuberia loretensis =

Species of legume

Jacqueshuberia loretensis is a species of legume in the family Fabaceae. It is found only in Peru.
