= Guadua weberbaueri =

Scientific classification
- Kingdom: Plantae
- Clade: Tracheophytes
- Clade: Angiosperms
- Clade: Monocots
- Clade: Commelinids
- Order: Poales
- Family: Poaceae
- Genus: Guadua
- Species: G. weberbaueri

Binomial name
- Guadua weberbaueri Pilg.

Species of grass

Guadua weberbaueri (Brazilian Portuguese: taboca) is a species of clumping bamboo found in Bolivia, Brazil, Colombia, Ecuador, French Guiana, Peru and Venezuela.

This bamboo is used for construction, containers, musical instruments and handicrafts.
