= International Bamboo and Rattan Organization =

Human aid independent organization

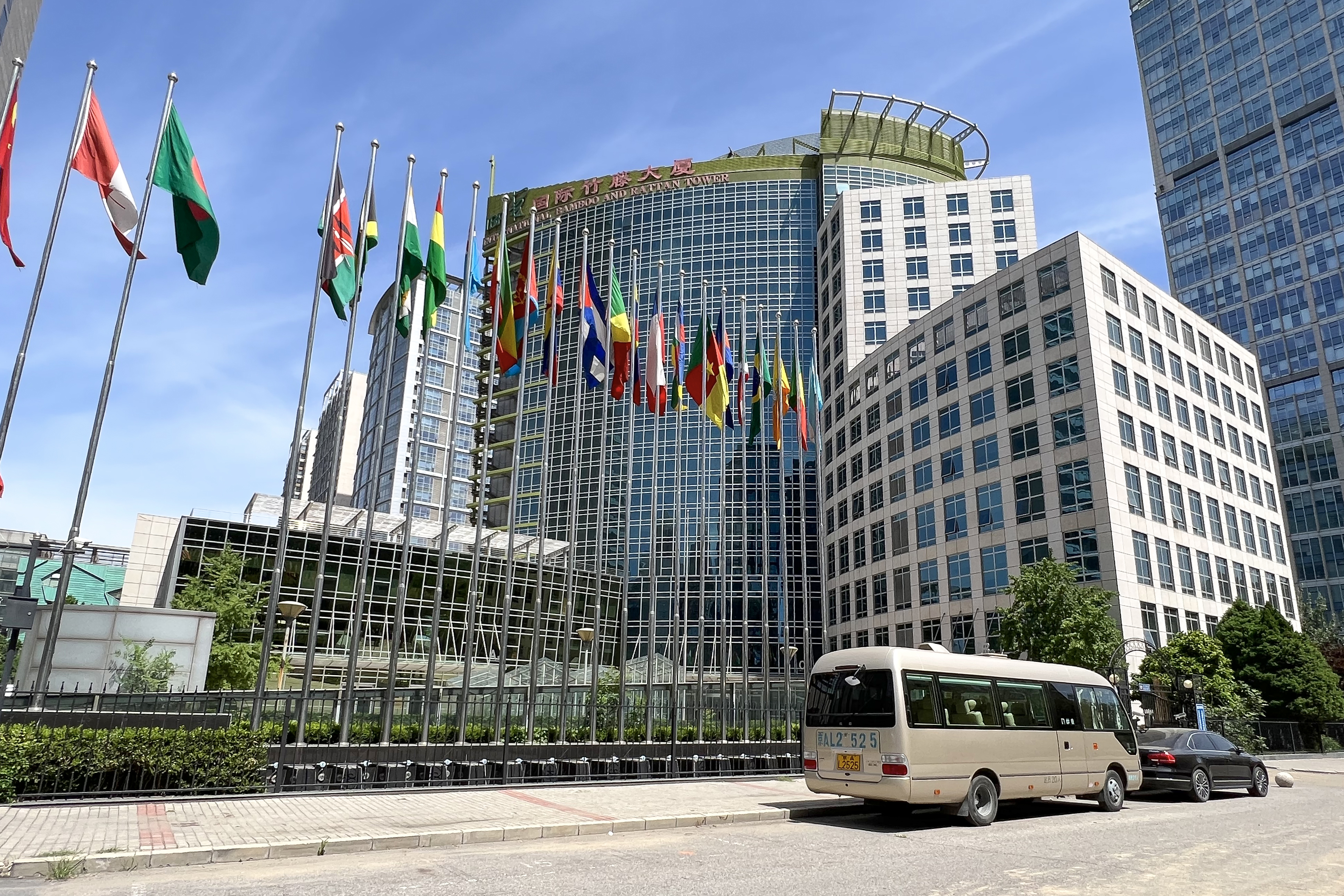
- Headquarters of INBAR in Wangjing, Beijing, China

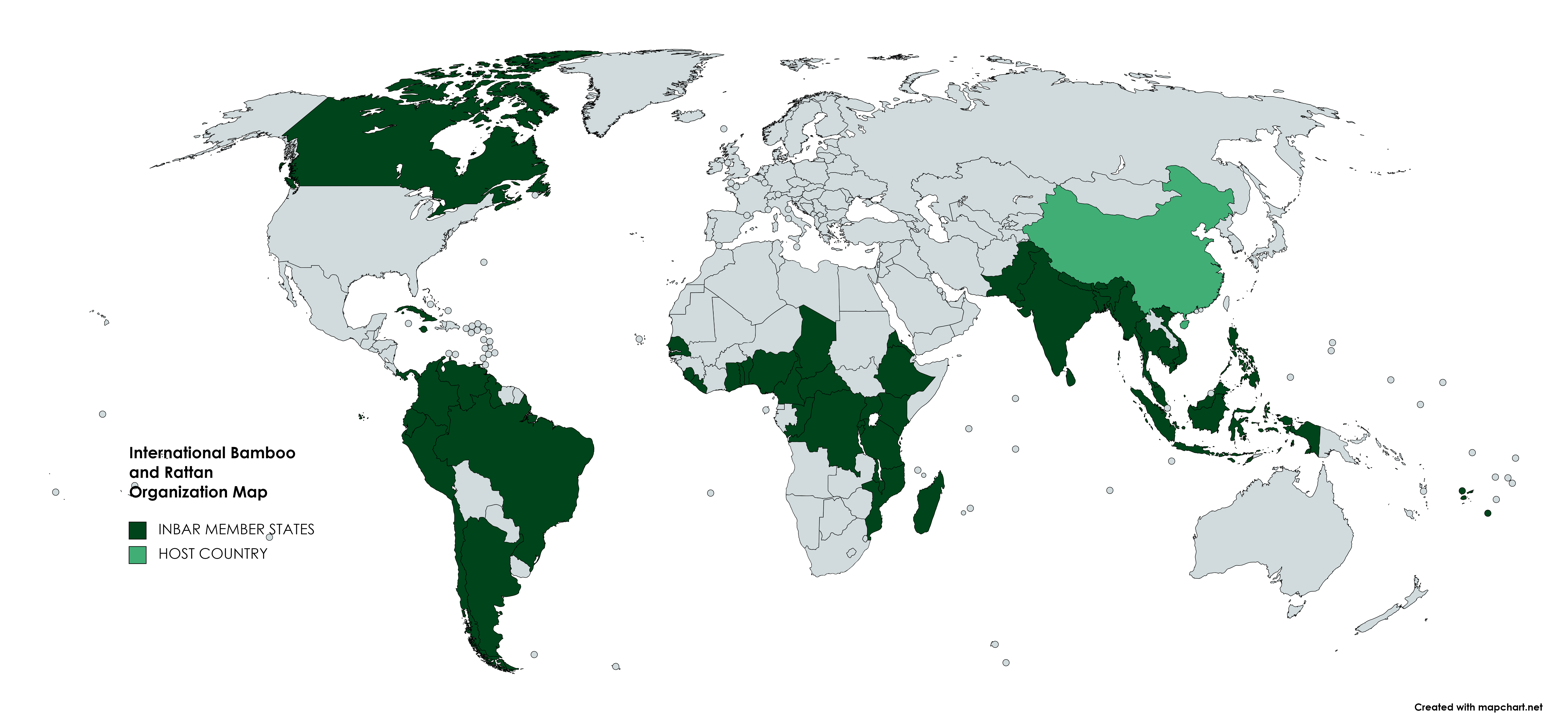
- International Bamboo and Rattan Organization Map
- Abbreviation: INBAR
- Formation: 1997
- Type: Independent intergovernmental organization
- Region served: Worldwide
- Official language: English, French, Spanish and Mandarin
- Director General: Teshome Toga Chanaka
- Staff: 60+
- Website: www.inbar.int

The International Bamboo and Rattan Organization (INBAR) is an independent intergovernmental organization established in 1997 to develop and promote innovative solutions to poverty and environmental sustainability using bamboo and rattan.

== History ==
INBAR evolved from an informal network of bamboo and rattan researchers set up in 1984 by the International Development Research Centre (IDRC) of Canada. The name "International Network for Bamboo and Rattan" was chosen in 1993. Work to launch INBAR as an independent organization started in 1995, and was completed in 1997 when INBAR became an independent organization with its headquarters in Beijing, China. Bangladesh, Canada, China, Indonesia, Myanmar, Nepal, Peru, the Philippines and the United Republic of Tanzania made up INBAR's nine founding members. Since then, INBAR has grown considerably in strength and scope away from a research-only organization and towards a more action-focused mandate. In November 2016 the name of the organization was changed to International Bamboo and Rattan Organization to reflect this change.

== Membership and structure ==
Membership of INBAR is open to member states of the United Nations and to intergovernmental organizations. INBAR currently has 50 Member States. INBAR's supreme governing body is its Council of representatives of its Member States, which meets biennially. The Board of Trustees, made up of appointed experts from relevant fields from many countries, is the second tier of governance, and develops appropriate policies, oversees management and ensures efficient operations at its annual meetings.

The Director General is a member of the Board of Trustees and is responsible for day-to-day running of the organization. The current Director General is Ambassador Ali Mchumo.

INBAR's headquarters is in Beijing, China, and it has regional offices in South Asia (New Delhi, India), Central Africa (Yaoundé, Cameroon), East Africa (Addis Ababa, Ethiopia), West Africa (Kumasi, Ghana) and Latin America and the Caribbean (Quito, Ecuador). INBAR is managed by its Executive Management team, which comprises the Director General, Deputy Director General, and the Directors of Global Program, Membership Affairs, Host Country Affairs, and Communications.

=== Involvement with UN organizations ===
INBAR collaborates with numerous UN organizations. INBAR was awarded Observer status to the UN General Assembly in 2017, and is also Observer to the UN Economic and Social Council. INBAR signed a Memorandum of Understanding with the Food and Agricultural Organization of the UN in 2020 to strengthen collaboration in bamboo resource assessment and assess the plant's potential contributions to UN Sustainable Development Goals and Global Forest Goals. In 2021, INBAR also became part of the UN Decade on Ecosystem Restoration, and in the same year also signed an agreement with the UN Industrial Development Organization to cooperate on bamboo and rattan business development. In 2023, INBAR was awarded Observer status to the UN Conference on Trade and Development.

INBAR also participates at the United Nations Framework Convention on Climate Change, the Convention on Biological Diversity, and the United Nations Convention to Combat Desertification, where it advocates for bamboo and rattan as solutions to global issues across the UN platforms.

The International Fund for Agricultural Development (IFAD) has been a key partner, providing long-term support to INBAR’s work on rural poverty alleviation. In 2015, INBAR estimated that IFAD-funded activities alone have helped generate around 250,000 jobs.

=== Involvement with other organizations ===
As an international intergovernmental organization, INBAR collaborates with a wide range of institutions and bodies. INBAR is a partner of the CGIAR Research Program on Forests, Trees and Agroforestry, member of the International Union for Conservation of Nature, a charter member of the Global Landscapes Forum, and a member of the International Union of Forest Research Organizations. Project donors include the Ministry of Foreign Affairs of the Netherlands, Spanish Agency for International Development Cooperation, the Global Environment Facility, the European Union and more.

== Member States as of August 2023 ==
- Argentina
- Bangladesh
- Benin
- Bhutan
- Brazil
- Burundi
- Cambodia
- Cameroon
- Canada
- Central African Republic
- Chad
- China
- Chile
- Colombia
- Republic of the Congo
- Cuba
- Democratic Republic of the Congo
- Ecuador
- Eritrea
- Ethiopia
- Fiji
- Ghana
- India
- Indonesia
- Jamaica
- Kenya
- Liberia
- Madagascar
- Malawi
- Malaysia
- Mozambique
- Myanmar
- Nepal
- Nigeria
- Pakistan
- Panama
- Peru
- Philippines
- Rwanda
- Senegal
- Sierra Leone
- Sri Lanka
- Suriname
- Tanzania
- Thailand
- Togo
- Tonga
- Uganda
- Venezuela
- Viet Nam

== Bamboo as a Substitute for Plastic ==
The Bamboo as a Substitute for Plastic (BASP) initiative is a part of the Global Development Initiative (GDI). The BASP initiative is aimed at mitigating plastic pollution and tackling climate change.

Over 400 million tonnes of plastic waste is generated annually, with billions of tonnes of plastics ending up in landfills and natural environments. This has led to negative environmental impacts linked to climate change, biodiversity loss and pollution. The BASP initiative seeks to address these issues by promoting the use of bamboo substitutes over plastic goods.

== See also ==
- Bamboo
- Rattan
- Poverty alleviation
- Sustainable development
- Bamboo construction
