= Prepiella sesapina =

Scientific classification
- Domain: Eukaryota
- Kingdom: Animalia
- Phylum: Arthropoda
- Class: Insecta
- Order: Lepidoptera
- Superfamily: Noctuoidea
- Family: Erebidae
- Subfamily: Arctiinae
- Genus: Prepiella
- Species: P. sesapina

Binomial name
- Prepiella sesapina (Butler, 1877)

Synonyms
- Mapeha sesapina Butler, 1877; Prepiella sesapina ab. rubripunctata Draudt, 1918

Species of moth

Prepiella sesapina is a moth in the subfamily Arctiinae. It was described by Arthur Gardiner Butler in 1877. It is found in Brazil (Espírito Santo) and Bolivia.
