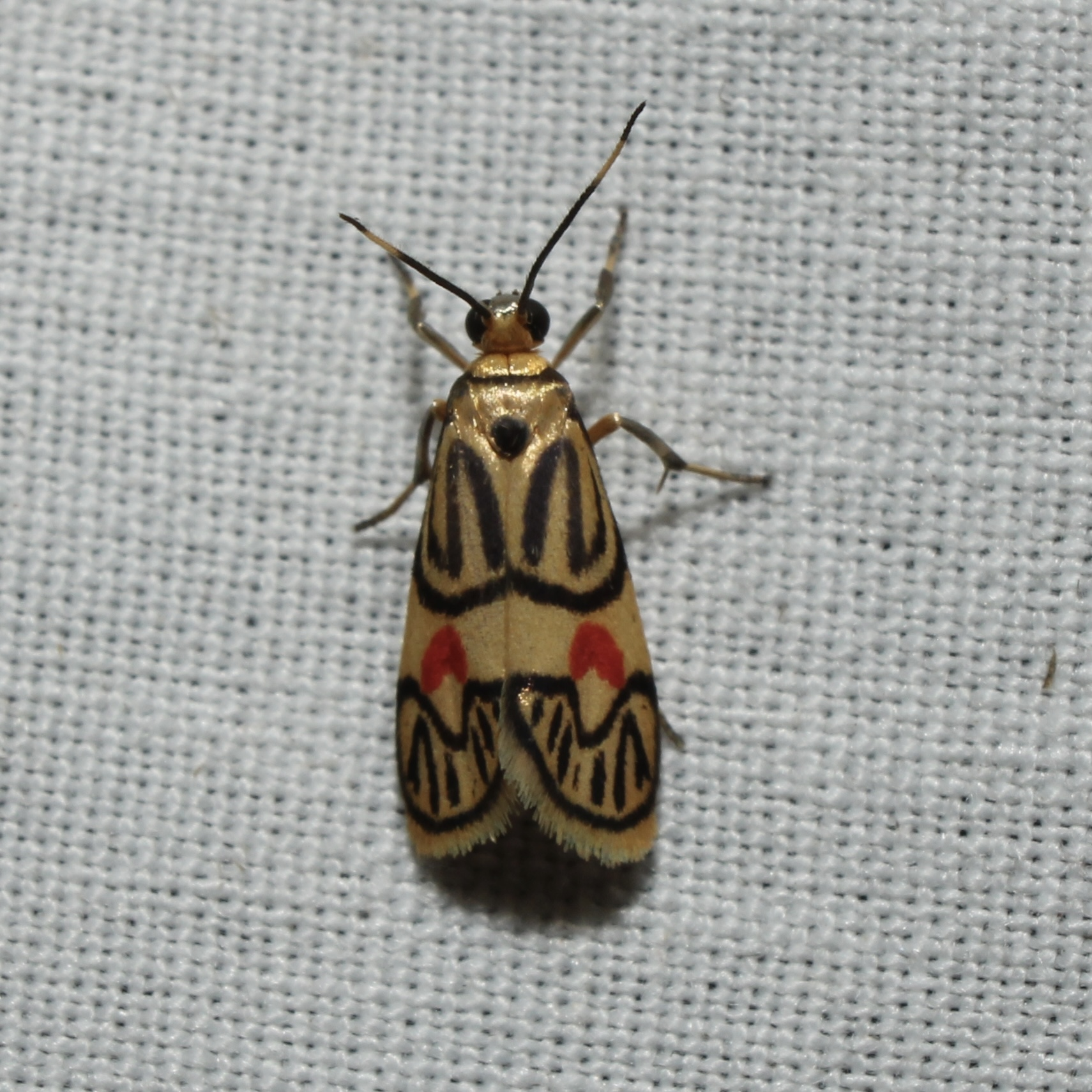

Scientific classification
- Kingdom: Animalia
- Phylum: Arthropoda
- Clade: Pancrustacea
- Class: Insecta
- Order: Lepidoptera
- Superfamily: Noctuoidea
- Family: Erebidae
- Subfamily: Arctiinae
- Genus: Prepiella
- Species: P. aurea

Binomial name
- Prepiella aurea (Butler, 1878)

Synonyms
- Maepha aurea Butler, 1878

= Prepiella aurea =

Species of moth

Prepiella aurea is a moth in the subfamily Arctiinae. It was described by Arthur Gardiner Butler in 1878. It is found in Venezuela and the Amazon region.
