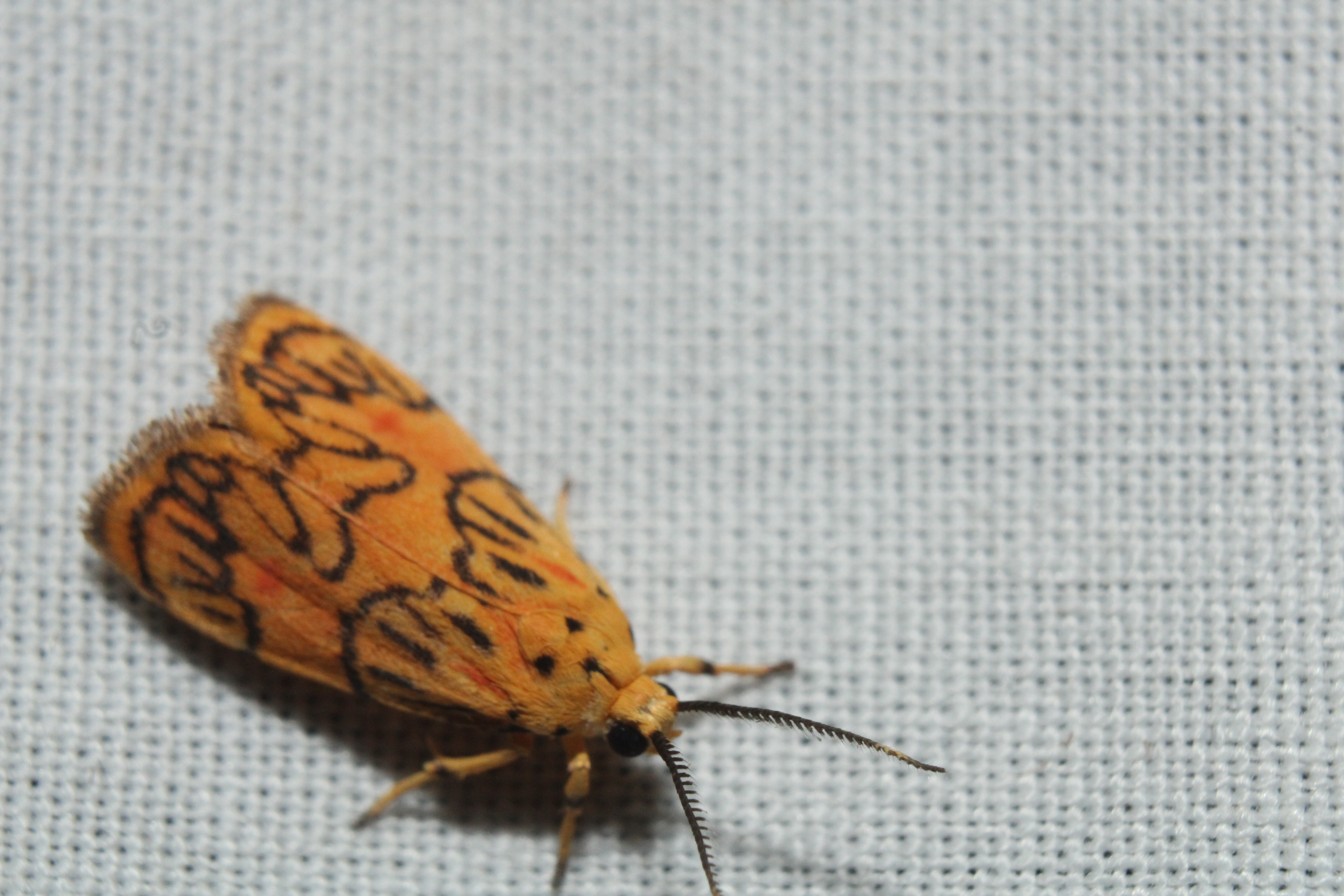

Scientific classification
- Kingdom: Animalia
- Phylum: Arthropoda
- Clade: Pancrustacea
- Class: Insecta
- Order: Lepidoptera
- Superfamily: Noctuoidea
- Family: Erebidae
- Subfamily: Arctiinae
- Genus: Prepiella
- Species: P. radicans

Binomial name
- Prepiella radicans Hampson, 1905

Synonyms
- Prepiella strigillata Rothschild, 1913

= Prepiella radicans =

Species of moth

Prepiella radicans is a moth in the subfamily Arctiinae. It was described by George Hampson in 1905. It is found in Guyana, Suriname and Peru.
