= Prepiella deicoluria =

Scientific classification
- Domain: Eukaryota
- Kingdom: Animalia
- Phylum: Arthropoda
- Class: Insecta
- Order: Lepidoptera
- Superfamily: Noctuoidea
- Family: Erebidae
- Subfamily: Arctiinae
- Genus: Prepiella
- Species: P. deicoluria

Binomial name
- Prepiella deicoluria Schaus, 1940

Species of moth

Prepiella deicoluria is a moth in the subfamily Arctiinae. It was described by William Schaus in 1940. It is found in Guyana.
