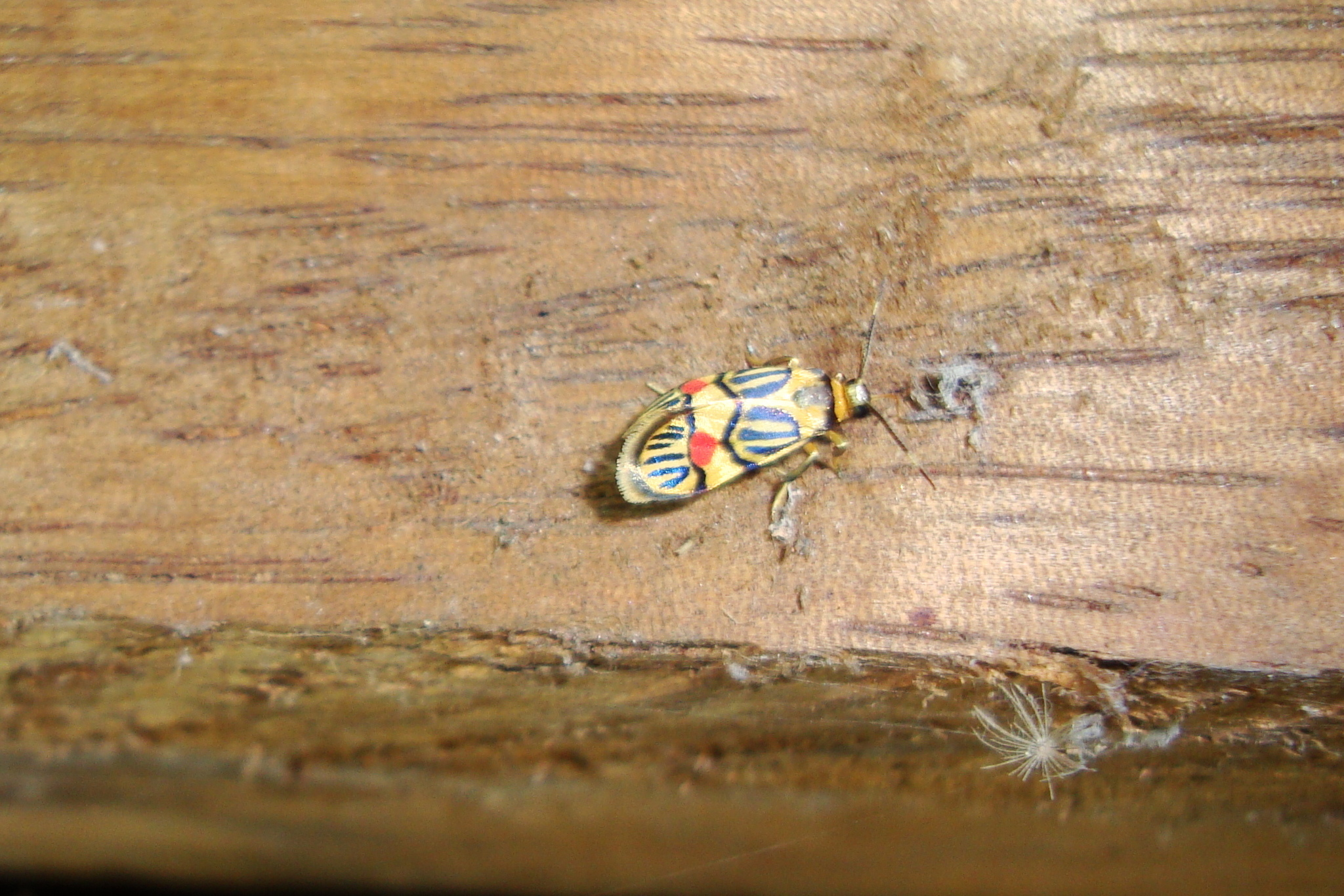

Scientific classification
- Domain: Eukaryota
- Kingdom: Animalia
- Phylum: Arthropoda
- Class: Insecta
- Order: Lepidoptera
- Superfamily: Noctuoidea
- Family: Erebidae
- Subfamily: Arctiinae
- Tribe: Lithosiini
- Genus: Prepiella; Schaus, 1899

Synonyms
- Prepiella Hampson, 1900

= Prepiella =

Genus of moths

Prepiella is a genus of moths in the subfamily Arctiinae. The genus was described by William Schaus in 1899.

== Species ==
- Prepiella aurea Butler, 1875
- Prepiella convergens Schaus, 1905
- Prepiella deicoluria Schaus, 1940
- Prepiella hippona Druce, 1885
- Prepiella miniola Hampson, 1900
- Prepiella pexicera Schaus, 1899
- Prepiella phoenicolopha Hampson, 1914
- Prepiella procridia Hampson, 1905
- Prepiella radicans Hampson, 1905
- Prepiella sesapina Butler, 1877
- Prepiella strigivenia Hampson, 1900
