= Prepiella miniola =

Scientific classification
- Kingdom: Animalia
- Phylum: Arthropoda
- Class: Insecta
- Order: Lepidoptera
- Superfamily: Noctuoidea
- Family: Erebidae
- Subfamily: Arctiinae
- Genus: Prepiella
- Species: P. miniola

Binomial name
- Prepiella miniola Hampson, 1900

Synonyms
- Prepiella peruana Draudt, 1918

Species of moth

Prepiella miniola is a moth in the subfamily Arctiinae. It was described by George Hampson in 1900. It is found in Peru and the Amazon region.
