= Prepiella phoenicolopha =

Scientific classification
- Kingdom: Animalia
- Phylum: Arthropoda
- Class: Insecta
- Order: Lepidoptera
- Superfamily: Noctuoidea
- Family: Erebidae
- Subfamily: Arctiinae
- Genus: Prepiella
- Species: P. phoenicolopha

Binomial name
- Prepiella phoenicolopha Hampson, 1914

Species of moth

Prepiella phoenicolopha is a moth in the subfamily Arctiinae. It was described by George Hampson in 1914. It is found in Ecuador.
