= Prepiella strigivenia =

Scientific classification
- Kingdom: Animalia
- Phylum: Arthropoda
- Class: Insecta
- Order: Lepidoptera
- Superfamily: Noctuoidea
- Family: Erebidae
- Subfamily: Arctiinae
- Genus: Prepiella
- Species: P. strigivenia

Binomial name
- Prepiella strigivenia Hampson, 1900

Species of moth

Prepiella strigivenia is a moth in the subfamily Arctiinae. It was described by George Hampson in 1900. It is found in Tefé, Brazil.
