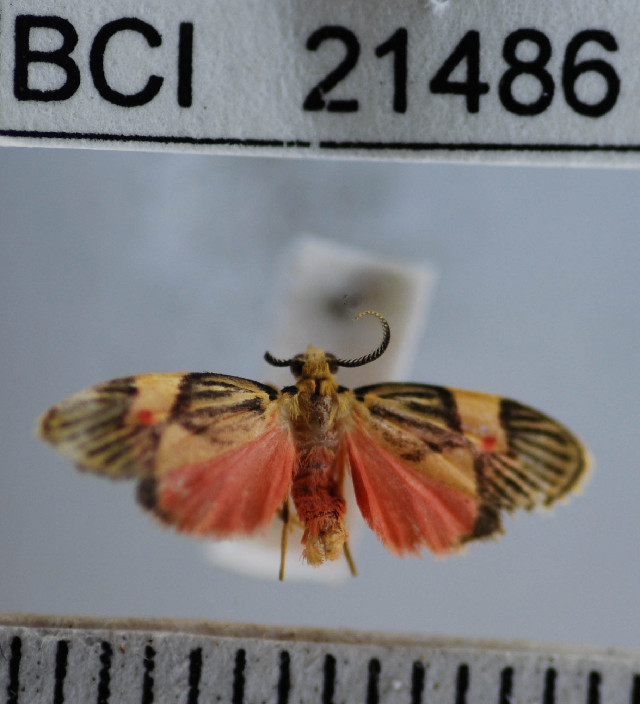

Scientific classification
- Domain: Eukaryota
- Kingdom: Animalia
- Phylum: Arthropoda
- Class: Insecta
- Order: Lepidoptera
- Superfamily: Noctuoidea
- Family: Erebidae
- Subfamily: Arctiinae
- Genus: Prepiella
- Species: P. pexicera

Binomial name
- Prepiella pexicera Schaus, 1899

= Prepiella pexicera =

Species of moth

Prepiella pexicera is a moth in the subfamily Arctiinae. It was described by William Schaus in 1899. It is found in Venezuela.
