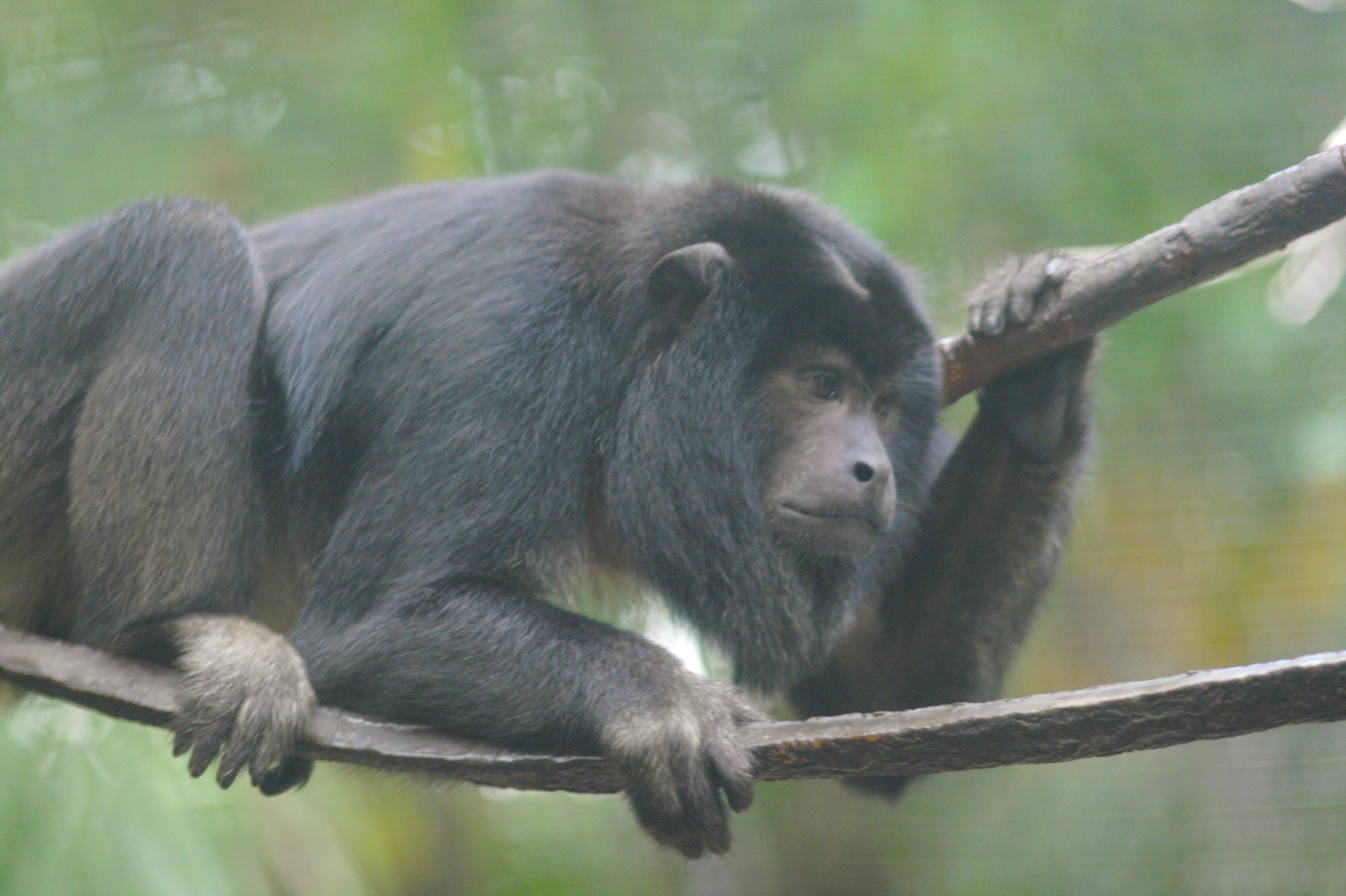
- Male
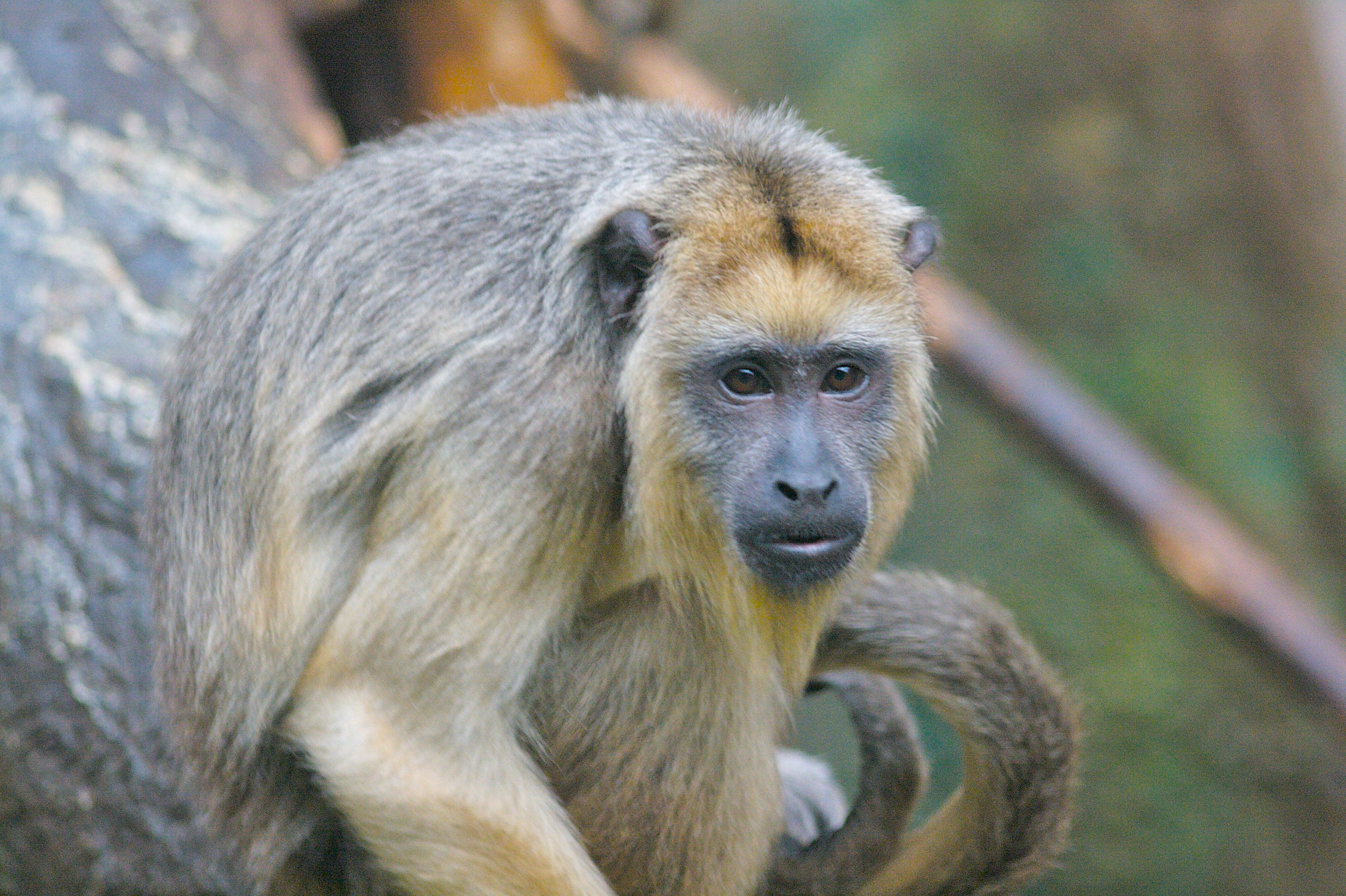
- Female; Both photographed at Pittsburgh Zoo

Conservation status
- Near Threatened (IUCN 3.1)

Scientific classification
- Kingdom: Animalia
- Phylum: Chordata
- Class: Mammalia
- Infraclass: Placentalia
- Order: Primates
- Family: Atelidae
- Genus: Alouatta
- Species: A. caraya

Binomial name
- Alouatta caraya (Humboldt, 1812)
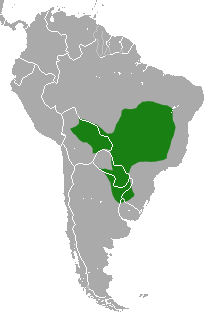
- Black Howler range

= Black howler =

Species of New World monkey

The black howler (Alouatta caraya) or black-and-gold howler, is among the largest New World monkeys and a member of the Alouatta genus. The black howler is distributed in areas of South America such as Paraguay, southern Brazil, eastern Bolivia, northern Argentina, and Uruguay. This species is sexually dimorphic, with adult males having entirely black fur and adult females and babies of both sexes having an overall golden colouring; which emphasizes black-and-gold in the name. The IUCN Red List has classed the black howler as Near Threatened as a result of a recent population reduction due to a variety of human-caused factors.

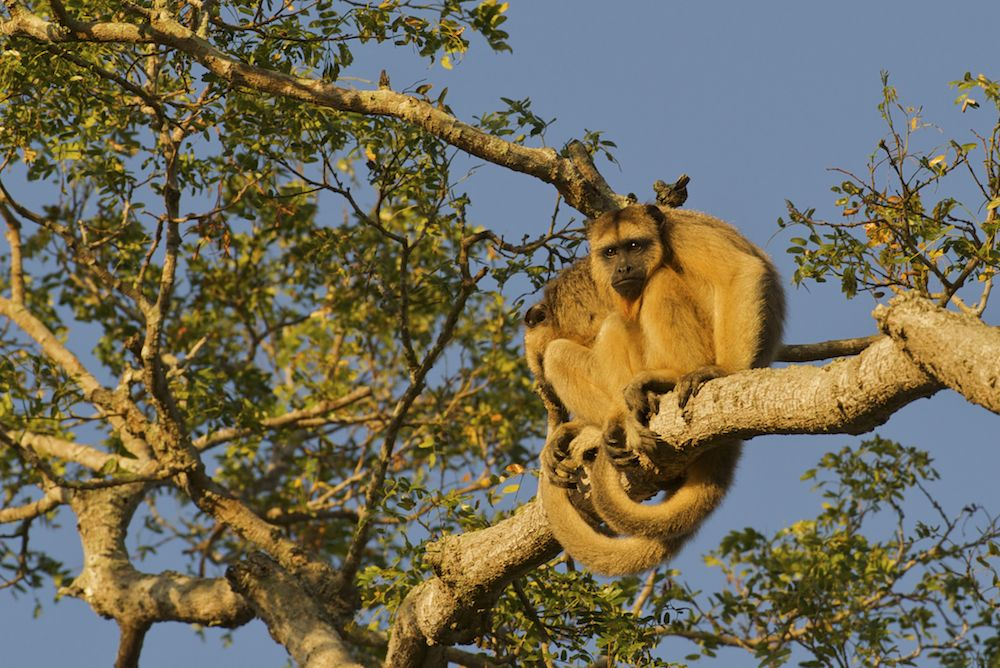
Two females in a tree branch, using their strong prehensile tail as a safety fifth limb, in Pantanal, Bolivia

== Taxonomy ==
The black howler is one of nine species of the Alouatta genus that have been identified and is in the Atelidae family. Because of this species' sexual dimorphism, the taxon for the black howler has been distinguished.

- Alouatta caraya
- Alouatta pigra
- Alouatta seniculus
- Alouatta arctoidea
- Alouatta sara
- Alouatta macconnelli
- Alouatta guariba
- Alouatta belzebul
- Alouatta palliata

== Description ==
=== Physical appearance ===
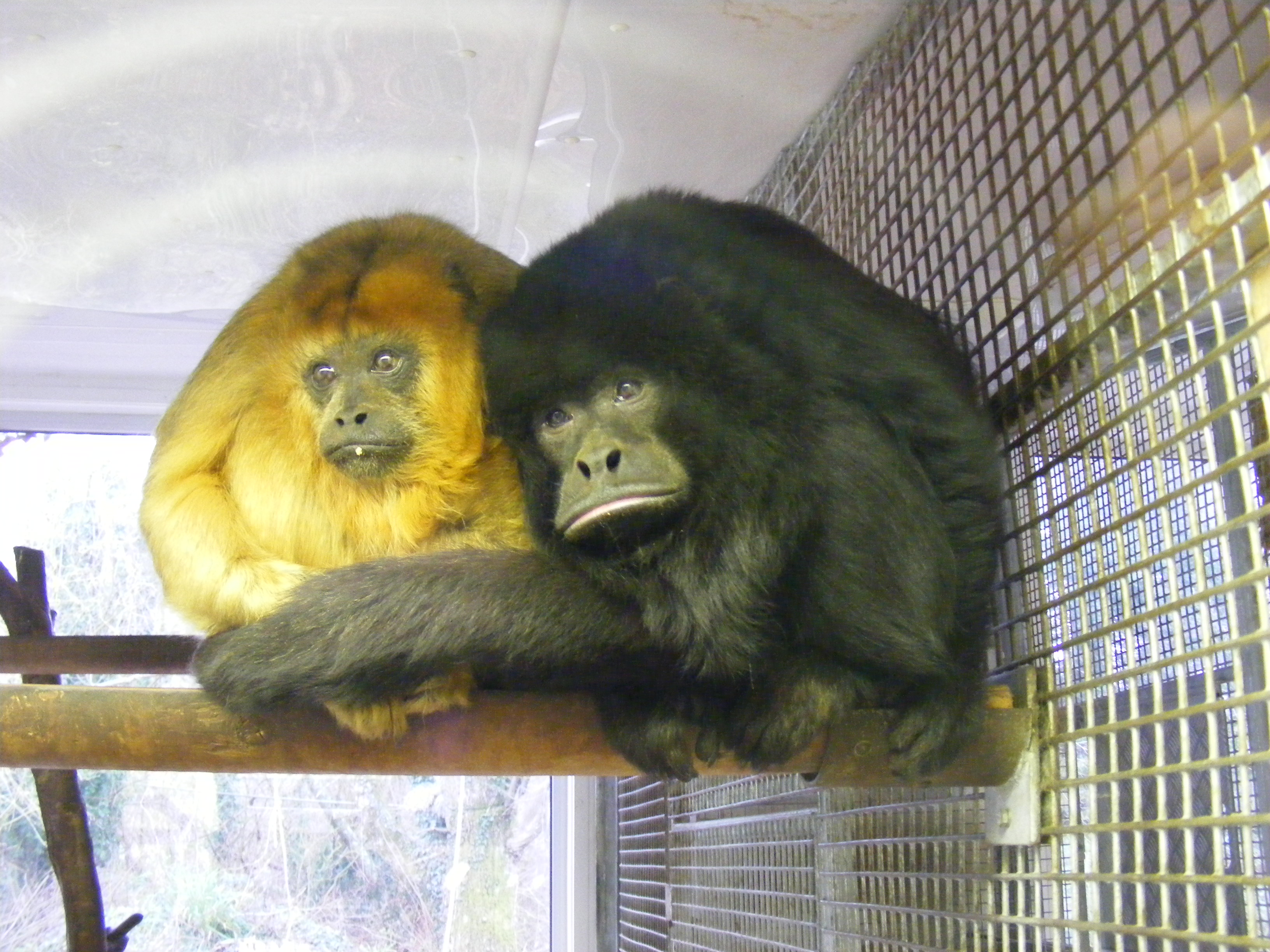
Female and male black and gold Howlers

Black howlers are sexually dimorphic, the male and the female are distinguishable due to the difference in their fur coatings. As the male black howler grows older, his fur will change from a golden colour to a complete black fur coat. The female, as well as infants of both sexes, have fur of a golden tone. Female howlers are lighter in weight than males, who are 47% heavier. Males' weight ranges from 6 kg to 7.7 kg. The hyoid bone volume of male black howlers is larger than that of female black howlers; it is assumed that this bone serves as a chamber for their howls. They have prehensile tails with a bare patch of skin on the underside, making them versatile climbers and allowing them to comfortably stay around in the canopy of trees.

=== Behaviour and diet ===
Black howlers share many behaviors with other howler monkeys. They are recognized for their 'howl', a powerful vocalization. A howler's 'howl' is one of the primates' strongest vocalizations, and it may be heard up to two kilometers away. The vocalizations of black howlers have been studied in Brazil, where they mostly vocalize around dawn. Howling is used as a behavioural strategy for displaying territory and regulating inter-group distance. This species is mostly arboreal, rarely coming down to the ground. They are also one of the least active groups of primates, as they are diurnal and spend up to 60-70% of the day resting or sleeping.

Although the diet of the black howler is largely folivorous, it does not prevents the digestion of fruits, figs, mosses, bark, seeds, and flowers. Eating leaves may appear to be unfeasible for other primates, as it lacks nourishment and energy; however, howlers have developed a complicated digestive system that allows them to digest leaves quickly and have strong molar teeth to help chew mature leaves.

Black howlers' activity levels vary depending on their diet. During the winter months, when fruit is scarce, most of their diet consists of leaves and they are less active compared to the summer months when fruit is more available. Activity ranges between feeding, socialization, locomotion, and sexual activity. Their gut microbiome composition changes seasonally to accommodate dietary changes due to restrictions of resources in the environment. Their diet is not different between different sexes and ages.

=== Group composition ===
Group composition has a large varied range in population density and social organization when focusing on black howler monkeys. Due to minimal human influence along the Paraná River in Brazil, for example, the woods remain well conserved, which results in larger densities of black howlers. Usually, howler monkeys have a single dominant male, with multiple adult females and babies in smaller groups. In larger groups, the howler monkeys' group composition can vary. In a 2009 study by Lucas M. Aguiar, Gabriela Ludwig, and Fernando C. Passos, in the Upper Paraná River of southern Brazil, the black and gold howler groups size was around 6 to 18 individuals. There were 11 groups total in Paraná River and groups were all multi-male; the females were outnumbered. The range for how many black howler monkeys in terms of age and sex in individual groups were represented. The study concluded that in these individual groups, it was likely to see a range of male adult black howlers from two to five, three to seven adult females, zero to four adolescents, and zero to three babies.

=== Mating ===
Mating behaviour and patterns of the black howlers have been identified. A study by Martin M. Kawoleski and Paul A. Garber in 2010 examined the promiscuity of black howler females along the Paraná River in Argentina using a scan sampling technique. According to the findings, sexual solicitation of female mate choice occurred when a female actively pursued a particular male by grooming, touching, and following him, and displaying a specific posture to get the male to approach them. During fertile and nonfertile phases, black howler monkey species' females mate with many adult males. Female black and gold howlers have been shown to conceive within a 3–4 day ovulatory phase, according to previous research. It is still unknown if male howlers can discriminate ovulatory phases in females using visual or smell cues. The adult female black howlers tend to give birth within 180–194 days after copulating. In black howlers, mating promiscuity is a behavioural habit that favours offspring genetic variety and can lead to a lot of genetic variations inside the group. According to Kawoleski and Garber, the black howler has a low rate of infanticide, which is one of the theories said to contribute to the female howler's promiscuity.

== Distribution and habitat ==
The black howler is distributed in areas of Central and South America such as Paraguay, southern Brazil, eastern Bolivia, northern Argentina, and occasionally, Uruguay. Howler monkeys are adaptable to numerous forest environments in Central and South America. They have been spotted in tropical and subtropical forests such as evergreen, seasonally dry deciduous, semideciduous, gallery, montane, woodland, and flooded forests. They may survive in a variety of settings, including disturbed ecosystems and forest remnants in agricultural regions and human populations.

== Status and conservation ==
From the IUCN Red List, the black howler is seen as a Near Threatened species. This is a result to population declines, habitat degradation, hunting pressure, and disease outbreak vulnerability. Anthropogenic disturbances are the top common reasons for the slow decrease of the black howler population; jeopardizing and degrading their ecosystems for residential and commercial development as well as agriculture. Hunting and the illegal pet trade are also contributing factors to the black howler's population reduction. In a 2020 study in the city of Pilar, Paraguay, examining the attitudes of humans towards urban howler monkeys, the researchers asked selected participants questions regarding hunting and pet trade of black and gold howler monkeys. In their findings, 93% of participants said they knew it was illegal to kill the monkeys, but more than half of the participants did not know it was also prohibited to keep them as pets. It was also stated in their findings that 8% of participants believe that black and gold howler monkeys had been hunted for their flesh. Black howlers are also susceptible to disease such as yellow fever. In Brazil, there have been outbreaks of sylvatic yellow fever that have resulted in significant population declines.

=== Human interactions ===
The interaction between people and black and gold howlers was also a topic of the research conducted by Marco Alesci et al. in 2020 in the city of Pilar, Paraguay. People interviewed for this research believed that there were many benefits to having the black howler monkeys in the urban environment such as a benefit for increasing tourism. The researchers also polled a group of people in Pilar regarding the conservation of black howlers in the area as part of their research. As a result, domestic dogs attacking black howlers in urban areas, electrocution on uninsulated power lines, and people killing the monkeys were all recognized as threats. Because the power lines are commonly utilized for transit by the black howler monkeys, three howler fatalities by electrocution were documented during the research period. As mentioned in the article, efforts for the conservation of the black howlers in Pilar are minimal, but if urbanization keeps rising, it may pose serious dangers to their existence by diminishing accessible trees and pushing howlers to walk on power wires or on the ground more.
