= Red howler =

The red howlers are five species of howler monkeys that used to be considered conspecific:

- Colombian red howler or Venezuelan red howler (Alouatta seniculus) – northwestern South America
- Bolivian red howler (Alouatta sara) – Santa Cruz Department, Bolivia
- Guyanan red howler (Alouatta macconnelli) – northeastern South America
- Juruá red howler (Alouatta juara) – southeastern Amazon basin
- Purus red howler (Alouatta puruensis) – southeastern Amazon basin
