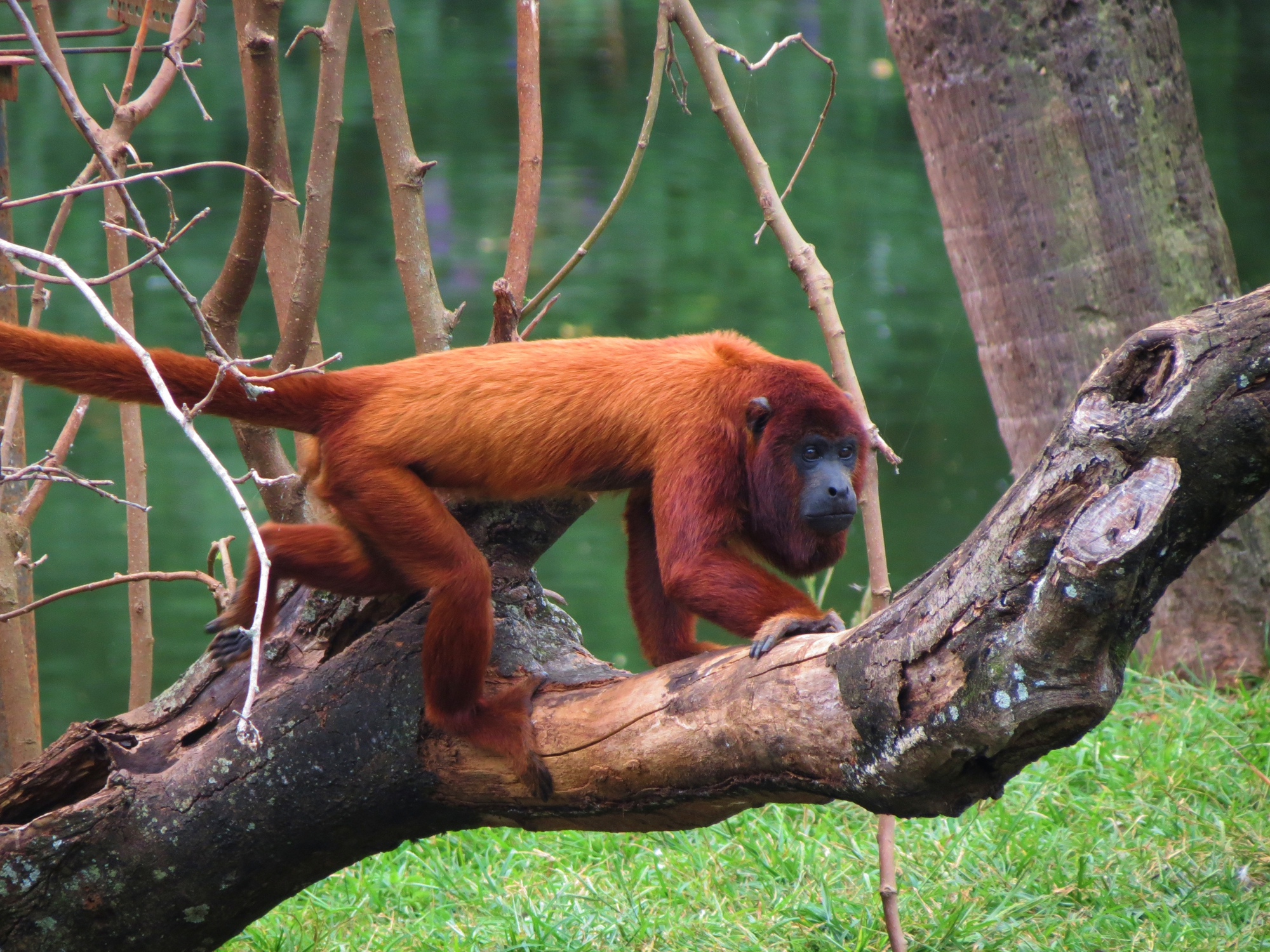
- At Sorocaba Zoo, Sorocaba

Conservation status
- Least Concern (IUCN 3.1)

Scientific classification
- Kingdom: Animalia
- Phylum: Chordata
- Class: Mammalia
- Infraclass: Placentalia
- Order: Primates
- Family: Atelidae
- Genus: Alouatta
- Species: A. seniculus

Binomial name
- Alouatta seniculus (Linnaeus, 1766)
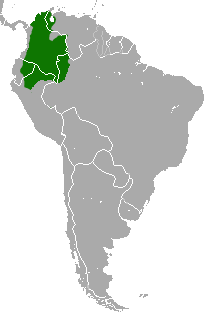
- Colombia red howler range

Synonyms
- Simia seniculus Linnaeus, 1766

= Colombian red howler =

Species of monkey

The Colombian red howler or Venezuelan red howler (Alouatta seniculus) is a South American species of howler monkey, a type of New World monkey, found in the western Amazon Basin in Venezuela, Colombia, Ecuador, Peru and Brazil. The population in the Santa Cruz Department in Bolivia was split off as a separate species, the Bolivian red howler, in 1986, and more recently, splitting off the population in northeastern South America and Trinidad as the Guyanan red howler has occurred. All howler monkeys belong to the family Atelidae and the infraorder Platyrrhini (New World monkeys).

== Description ==
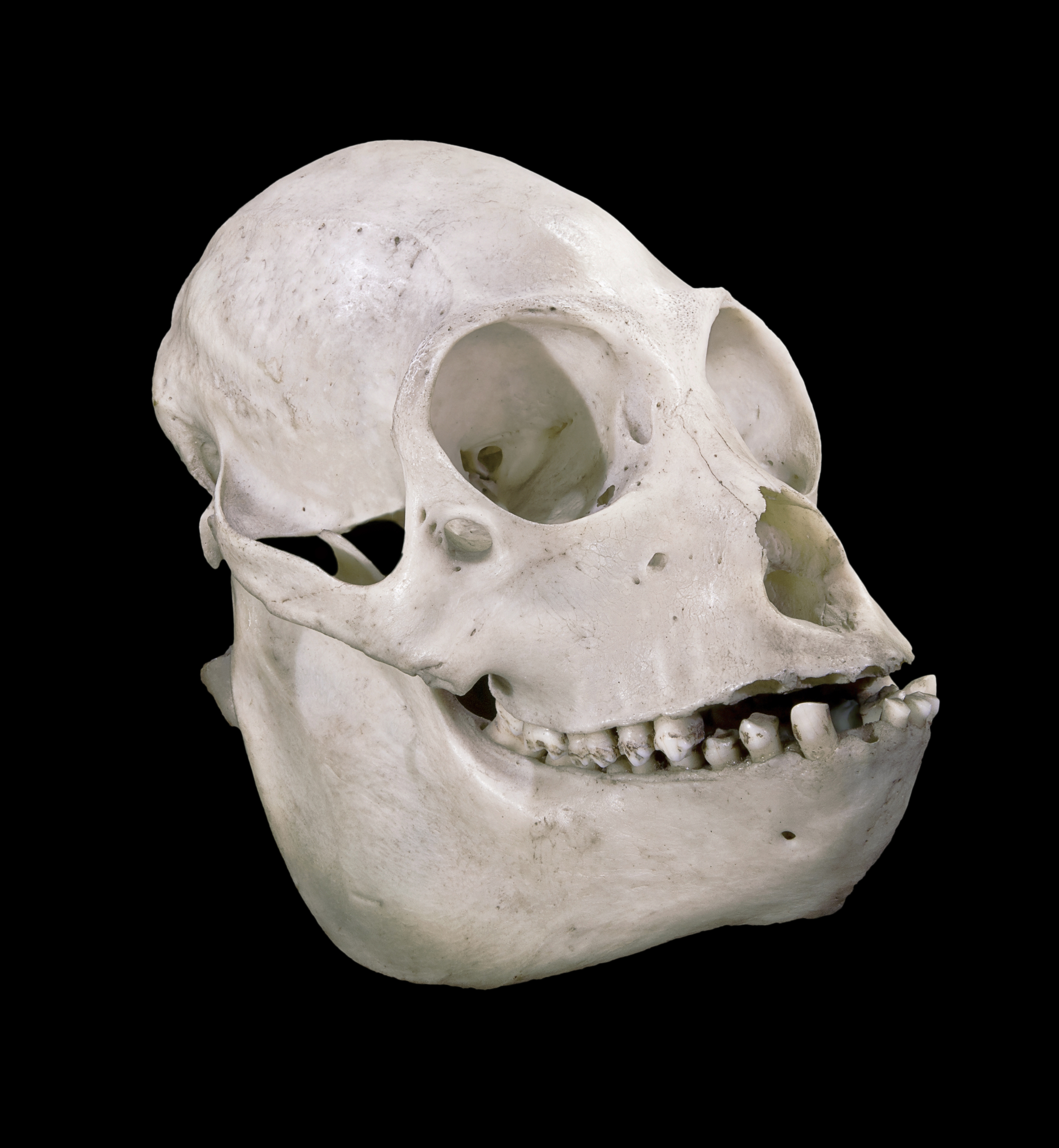
Skull of Alouatta seniculus.

Sexual dimorphism in this species is small; males range from 49 to 72 cm and females from 46 to 57 cm long. The males weigh 5.4–9 kg, while females weigh 4.2–7 kg. It has a long prehensile tail of 49–75 cm. The tail is covered with fur except for the last third of the underside, which allows it to grab branches. The color of both males and females is a deep reddish-brown, and the color shade changes with age. Their faces are surrounded by fur and they have stubby noses.

The jawbone of the red howler monkey is large, especially the body of the mandible. The position of the foramen magnum is very posterior to make way for the expanded jaw and enlarged hyoid bone. Howler monkeys also have an inflated bulla, which is the bony encasement of the middle ear. This makes them an exception among other New World monkeys.

The diurnal Alouatta seniculus is an arboreal primate, so it spends much of its time high in the canopy. Its preferred method of locomotion is quadrupedal walking with minimal leaping. Its long, prehensile tail also assists it by providing both support and grasping abilities. In addition, its hands and feet have a grasping pattern that allows it to better move about in the trees. This can be seen by the wide separation of the second and third digits of the hand.

== Social interactions ==
It lives in groups of three to nine individuals (usually five to seven). The groups are polygynous, with only one or two males and the rest females and their offspring. One male is the usually dominant monkey of the group, the alpha male, and he is responsible for leading them to new food sites and defending them. The females of the group are in charge of the offspring. Venezuelan red howlers are most active in the morning, when the group is on the move to find another feeding spot. These howlers are famous for their "dawn chorus". These roaring and howling calls are performed mostly by the males in the group. The roars can be heard up to 5 km away in the forest, and make their presence known in the area. This is also used to prevent confrontations between groups, which will prevent energy loss by avoiding physical fighting. Because of their low-sugar diets, conservation of energy is key. The calls also help in the scattering of the groups and lessens the competition over food.

== Diet and dentition ==
A. seniculus monkeys are folivores, which means their diets mainly consist of leaves, but they also rely on nuts, small animals, fruits, seeds, and flowers for important nutrients. These foods provide sugar necessary for growth and energy. The most important part of their diets is leaves, which they cannot live without for more than a week. They eat both older and younger leaves; however, the older leaves provide more nutrition. These howler monkeys are able to eat the fibrous leaves due to the structural aspects of their dentition. Narrow incisors aid in the ingestion of the leaves, and molars with sharp, shearing crests help them to better chew their food. In addition, they have complex stomachs to aid in the digestive process. Their hindguts and large intestines also help with digestion. The hindgut contains bacteria that digest leaves and makes up a third of the Venezuelan red howler's total body volume.

Like other New World monkeys, the Venezuelan red howler's dental formula (maxilla and mandible) is two incisors, one canine, three premolars, and three molars.

== Reproduction ==
The fierce sexual competition between males is due to an unbalanced sex ratio. A female attracts males by moving her tongue around to initiate mating. If the male does not respond, she moves on to another mate. The average gestation period is 190 days. The infant will stay with the mother for 18–24 months. After males reach sexual maturity, they are expelled from their natal group. The male must then invade a foreign group. There, the male kills off the other leader and whatever offspring the first leader sired. By doing this, the male is killing any possible competition. Less than 25% of offspring survive male invasions.

== Subspecies ==
Traditionally, three subspecies of this howler are listed, though Stanyon et al. (1995) concluded the number of chromosomal differences between A. s. sara and A. s. arctoidea (which resulted in A. s. sara being a considered a full species) was on a similar scale to that found between A. s. sara and A. s. seniculus by Minezawa et al. (1986).

- Colombian red howler, Alouatta seniculus seniculus
- Ursine howler, A. s. arctoidea
- Juruá red howler, A. s. juara

A. s. juara has been described as a different species Alouatta juara.
