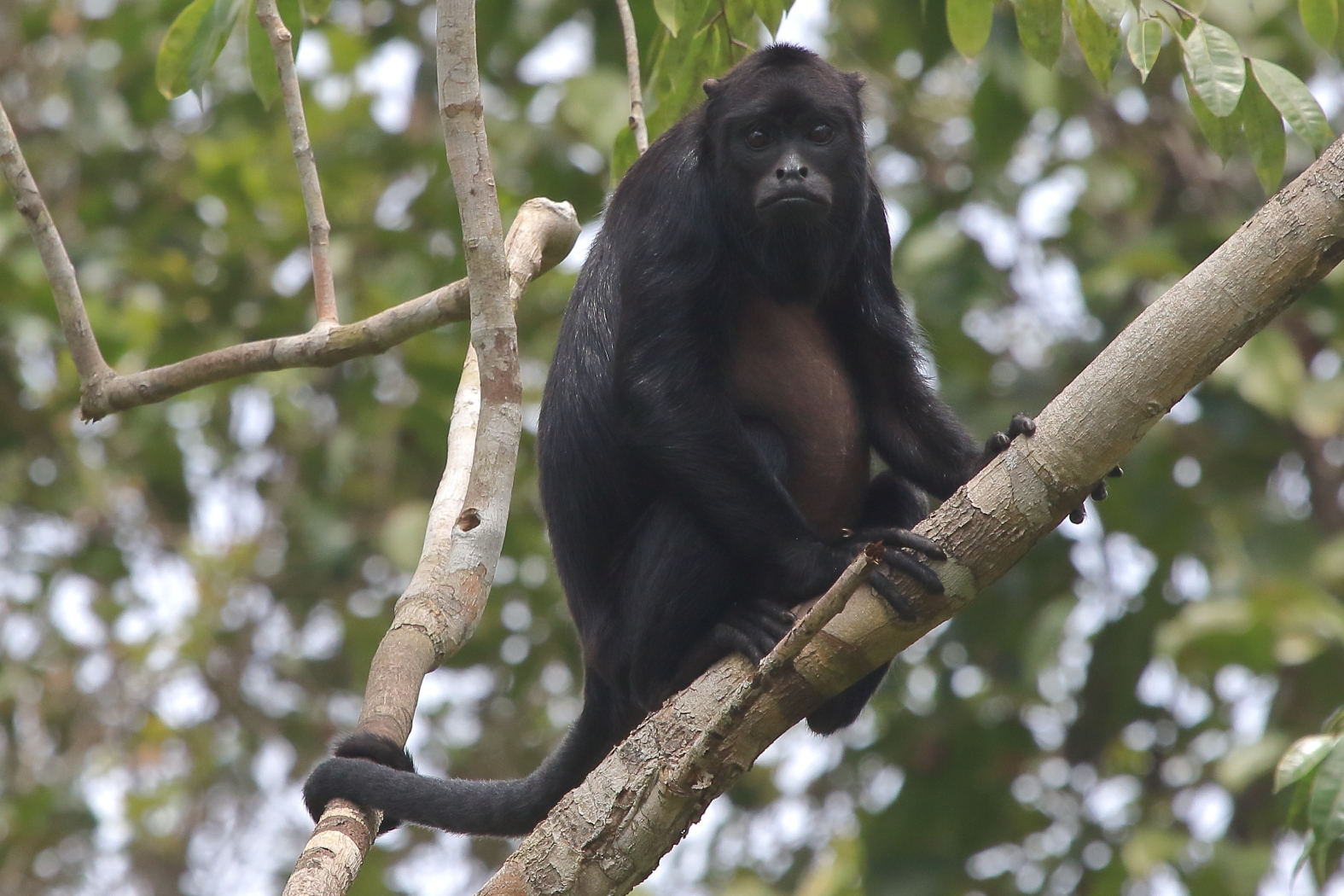

Conservation status
- Least Concern (IUCN 3.1)

Scientific classification
- Kingdom: Animalia
- Phylum: Chordata
- Class: Mammalia
- Infraclass: Placentalia
- Order: Primates
- Family: Atelidae
- Genus: Alouatta
- Species: A. nigerrima

Binomial name
- Alouatta nigerrima Lönnberg, 1941
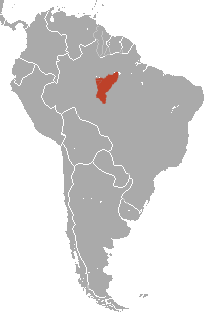
- Amazon black howler range

= Amazon black howler =

Species of New World monkey

The Amazon black howler (Alouatta nigerrima) is a species of howler monkey, a type of New World monkey, endemic to the south-central Amazon in Brazil. Until 2001, most authorities included it as a subspecies (or simply a taxonomically insignificant variation) of the red-handed howler, though its distinction had already been pointed out much earlier. As suggested by its name, it typically appears entirely black.

== Diet ==
The Amazon black howler eats leaves.
