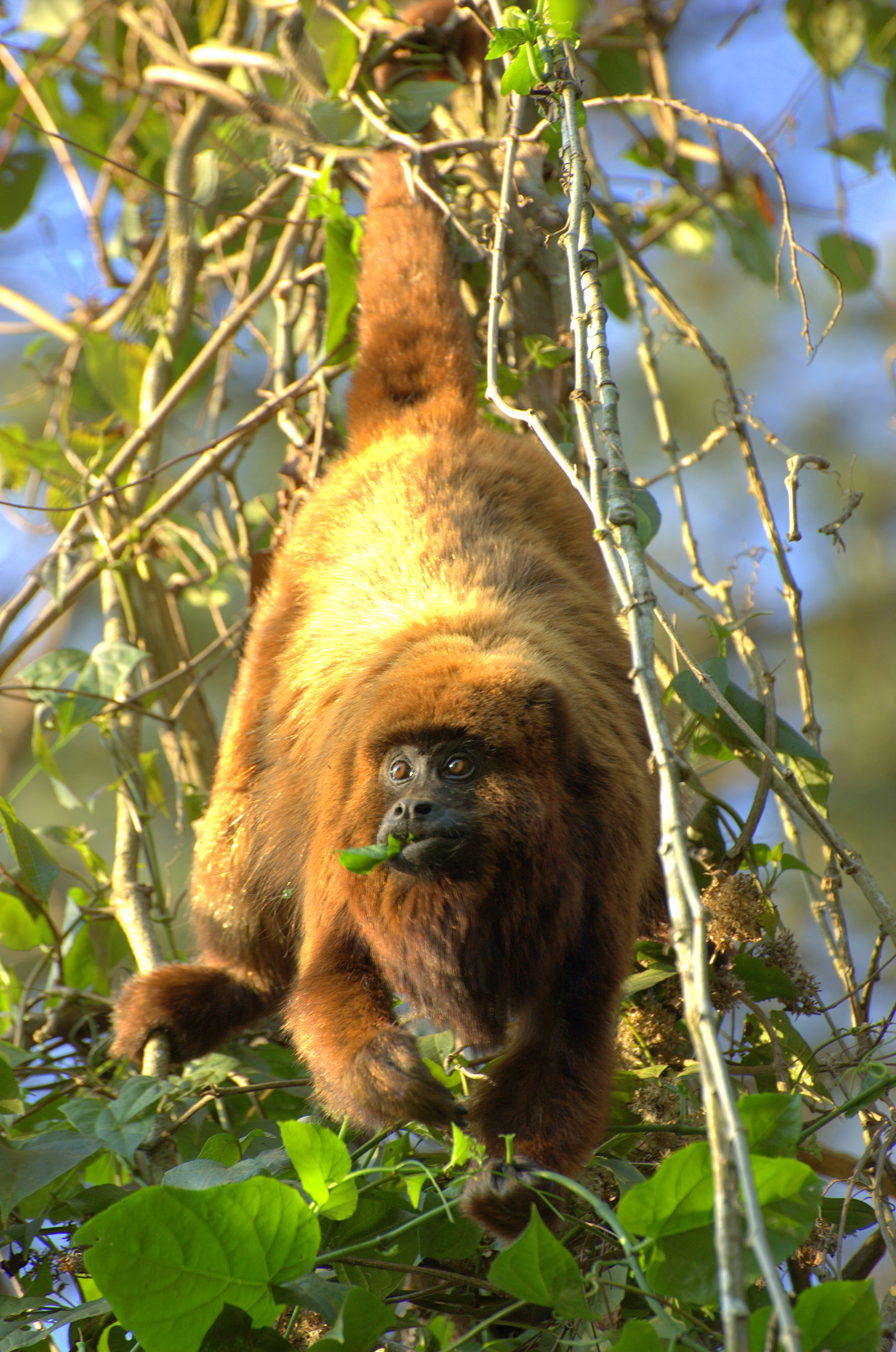
- Alouatta guariba clamitans

Conservation status
- Vulnerable (IUCN 3.1)

Scientific classification
- Kingdom: Animalia
- Phylum: Chordata
- Class: Mammalia
- Order: Primates
- Suborder: Haplorhini
- Infraorder: Simiiformes
- Family: Atelidae
- Genus: Alouatta
- Species: A. guariba
- Subspecies: A. g. clamitans

Trinomial name
- Alouatta guariba clamitans Cabrera, 1940

= Southern brown howler =

Subspecies of New World monkey

The southern brown howler (Alouatta guariba clamitans) is a monkey subspecies of brown howler native to southeastern Brazil (Minas Gerais to Rio Grande do Sul) and far northeastern Argentina (Misiones). Gregorin, 2006, considered the southern brown howler to be a separate species, Alouatta clamitans, but this has not been universally accepted.

== Distribution and habitat ==
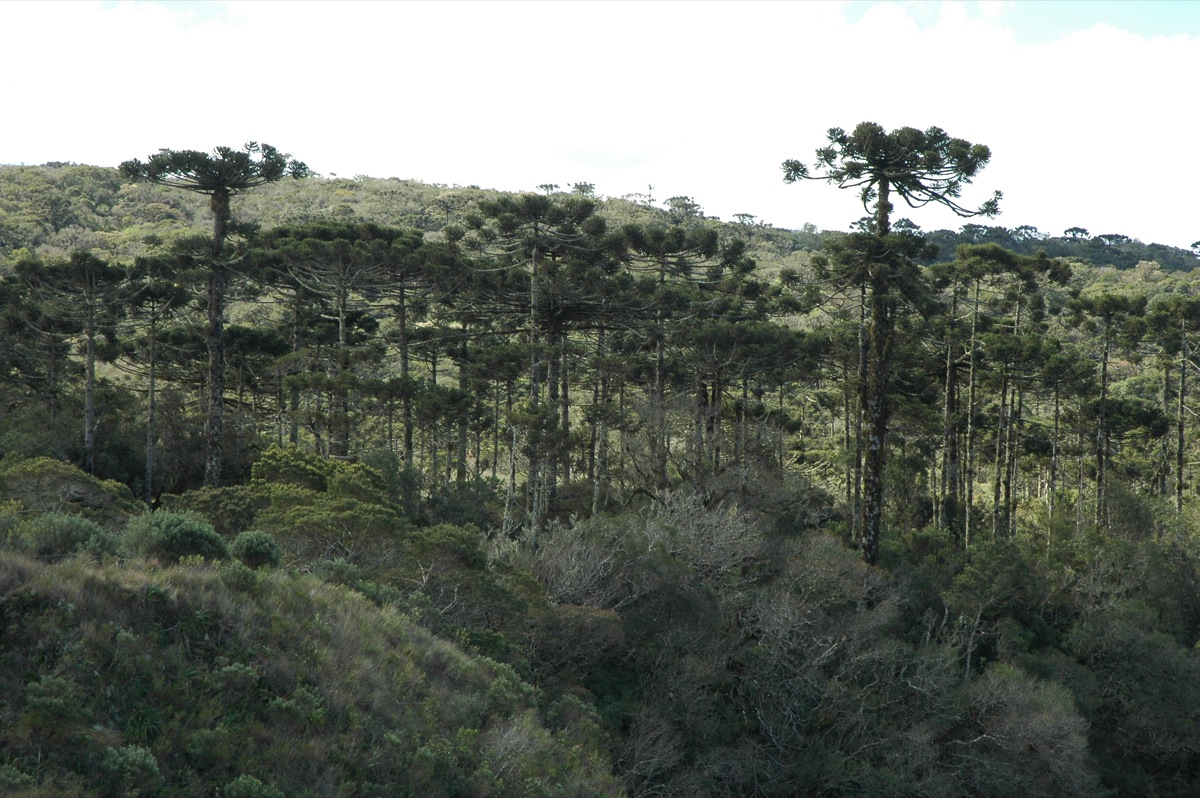
Araucaria jungle in Aparados da Serra National Park, which provides a habitat for this subspecies.

The southern brown howler is found in the Atlantic forests of eastern Brazil where it occurs in the states of Espírito Santo, Rio de Janeiro, Minas Gerais, São Paulo, Paraná, Santa Catarina and Rio Grande do Sul. Its range extends southwards as far as the Camaquã River and eastward to Misiones Province in Argentina. Its northern extent is unclear, but may be the Doce River or the Jequitinhonha River. Habitats include lowland, sub-montane and montane forests, and it is tolerant of disturbed habitats and human encroachment.

== Ecology ==
Howlers move around in small troops, consisting of a dominant male, several females and a number of juveniles. The monkeys are so called because of the loud calls made by males, more roar than howl, which can be heard a mile (1.5 km) or more away, mostly at dawn and dusk. The throats of males have enlarged vocal sacs and large tracheal cartilages which act as resonators to amplify the sounds. The diet of these monkeys consists mostly of leaves, supplemented by flowers and fruit, and these foods being plentiful in the rainforest, the territories defended by the troops are small. Rival troops howl at each other but territorial disputes are mostly settled vocally, without the monkeys needing to meet face to face.

In the Araucaria pine forests of southern Brazil, the chief predators of these monkeys are ocelots (Leopardus pardalis), cougars (Puma concolor), and jaguars (Panthera onca), as well as the larger birds of prey.

== Status ==
The International Union for Conservation of Nature has assessed this monkey's conservation status as being vulnerable. This is partly because of the monkey's susceptibility to yellow fever; during the period 2007 to 2009, an outbreak of yellow fever killed large numbers of howlers in the Misiones Province in Argentina, and the State of Rio Grande do Sul in Brazil. The animal has a wide range and is present in a number of protected areas, but the rainforest in which it lives is being cleared for cattle ranching and agriculture, resulting in fragmentation of the forest. The subpopulations in these fragments are likely to suffer from inbreeding. They are also impacted by urbanisation and are hunted for food.
