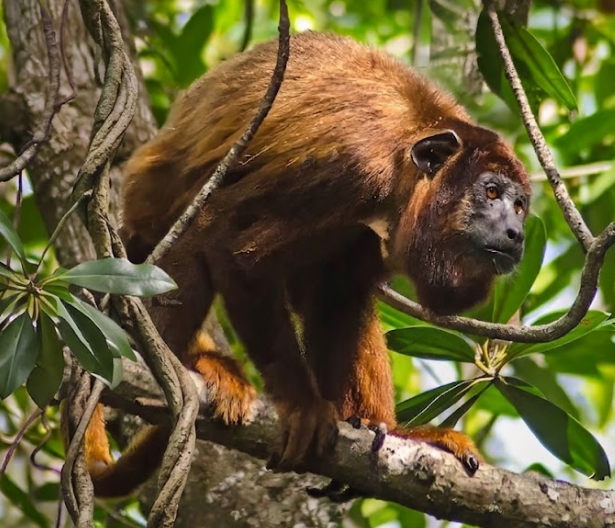

Conservation status
- Endangered (IUCN 3.1)

Scientific classification
- Kingdom: Animalia
- Phylum: Chordata
- Class: Mammalia
- Infraclass: Placentalia
- Order: Primates
- Family: Atelidae
- Genus: Alouatta
- Species: A. ululata

Binomial name
- Alouatta ululata Elliot, 1912
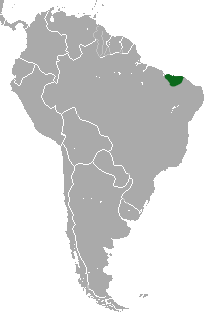
- Maranhao Red-handed Howler range

Synonyms
- Alouatta belzebul ululata

= Maranhão red-handed howler =

Species of New World monkey

The Maranhão red-handed howler (Alouatta ululata) is an endangered species of howler monkey endemic to forests (for example Babaçu forests) in the northeastern Brazilian states of Ceará, Maranhão and Piauí. It was previously thought to be a subspecies of the red-handed howler, but unlike that species, the Maranhão red-handed howler is strongly sexually dichromatic.

== Diet ==
The Maranhão red-handed howler is folivorous and frugivorous.
