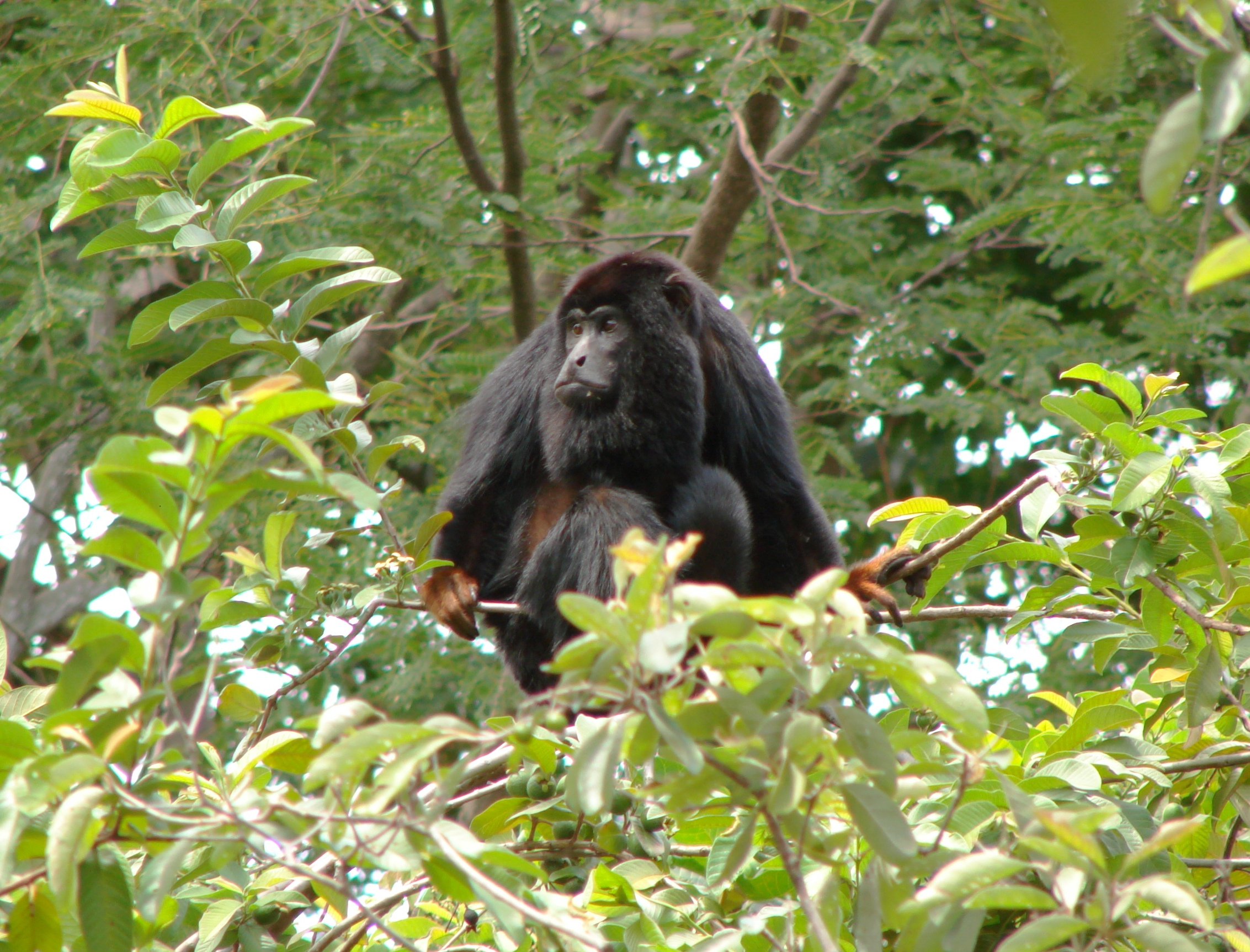
- Red-handed howler in Amazon, Brazil.

Conservation status
- Vulnerable (IUCN 3.1)

Scientific classification
- Kingdom: Animalia
- Phylum: Chordata
- Class: Mammalia
- Infraclass: Placentalia
- Order: Primates
- Family: Atelidae
- Genus: Alouatta
- Species: A. belzebul

Binomial name
- Alouatta belzebul (Linnaeus, 1766)
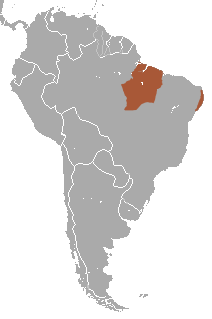
- Red-handed howler range

Synonyms
- Simia belzebul Linnaeus, 1766

= Red-handed howler =

Species of New World monkey

The red-handed howler (Alouatta belzebul) is a vulnerable species of howler monkey, a type of New World monkey. It is endemic to Brazil, found in the southeastern Amazon and disjunctly in the Atlantic Forest between Rio Grande do Norte and Sergipe.

== Taxonomy ==
Considerable taxonomic confusion has surrounded this species. Until 2001, most authorities included the Amazon black howler as a subspecies (or simply a taxonomically insignificant variation) of the red-handed howler, though its distinction had already been pointed out much earlier. The red-handed howler remained variable in ecology, colour and pattern of the fur, shape of the cranium, and shape of the hyoid bone (of great importance in the voice of the howler monkeys; a likely isolating mechanism between the species), but a geographical pattern was not clear, resulting in it being treated as a monotypic species. In 2006, a major review of the Brazilian members of the genus Alouatta was able to match some of the variations to geography (though further study was recommended), resulting in the recognition of the Spix's red-handed howler and Maranhão red-handed howler as species separate from the red-handed howler. Even with these as separate species, the colour and pattern of the fur of the red-handed howler remains variable. Most adults are black with reddish-brown hands, feet and distal part of their tails, but some are entirely black (resembling the Amazon black howler), reddish (resembling the red howlers) or somewhere in between.

== Physical Characteristics ==
The red‑handed howler has red hands and feet, while its fur is black or dark brown across the rest of the body. Adult males typically weigh between 7 and 9 kg (15 and 20 lb), measure around 90 cm (35 in) in head-body length, and exhibit significant sexual dimorphism in size and stature.

== Distribution and life history ==
It lives in the biomes of Amazonian and Atlantic forests which consist of dense forest separated by drier areas. These animals can live up to 20 years, and do not mature until later in their lives. They have a long gestation period, and generally reproduce more slowly than similar-sized mammals of other species. From the births that have been recorded, red-handed howlers have quick, quiet births during the day when they are normally active. Once born, if the mother is experienced, she will carry her young ventrally for three weeks and then switch to dorsally once the offspring is slightly more developed.

== Behavior and diet ==
When not foraging, the red-handed howler rests in the canopy of mature trees 20 m (66 ft) from the forest floor. It lives in social groups of seven to 12 members, with one or two mature males, females, juveniles, and infants.

The red‑handed howler is folivorous. It lives uses loud howling vocalizations to mark territory and coordinate group activities.

== Threats ==
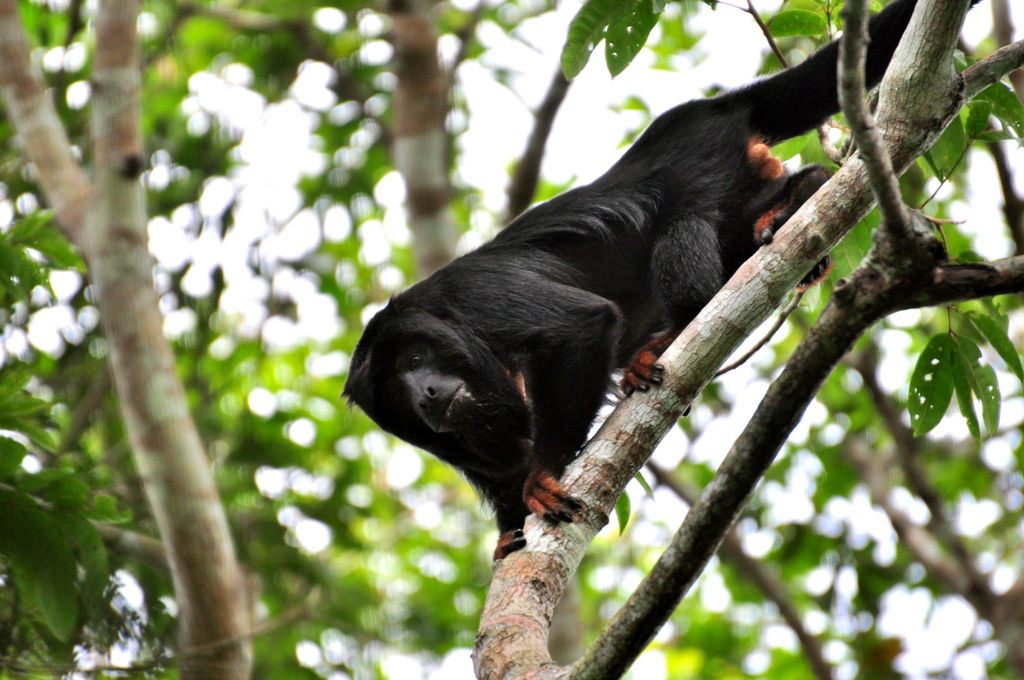
Red-handed howler monkey in Gargaú Reserve, Paraíba, Brazil

Threats to this species are numerous. First, they are a large-bodied mammal hunted for food. Females with young are especially good targets for hunting because the babies can be sold as pets and the mothers can be used for their meat. Slower reproduction of these mammals also prevents them from replenishing the population in response to this pressure. The red-handed howler monkey has one of the smallest ranges of their genus, which makes them even more susceptible to threats. Second, the Trans-Amazonia and the Belém–Brasília Highways intersect their habitats, which causes collisions with automobiles. Third, the threat from agriculture is increasing. Increasing population pressures have forced farmers to clear more land for farming and these clear-cut methods are too much of a disturbance for the red-handed howler. Some small disturbances are tolerated by species that focus more on leaves, but since A. belzebul is mostly frugivorous, it is harder for them to adapt to change. Logging is yet another concern, because it not only disrupts the habitat too much, but it also allows better access to their habitats for hunters by use of the access roads. Fourth, habitat fragmentation accompanies all of these disturbances. If the forest does eventually regenerate, there will still be no way for new howlers to come back into the area and it also prohibits gene flow and the amount of genetic variation will decrease. Lastly, predation can have a large effect on the population. Since the populations are usually in groups in small areas, they are easy prey for animals such tayras. One study found tayras had found their way onto an island and took out a large portion of the population by hunting together and preying on the family groups in the area.

=== Conservation steps ===
A variety of options can be put into place to help the red-handed howler monkey recover. First, landowners can be encouraged to make sanctuaries or protect vital habitats. Since this species relies so heavily on fruit, certain habitats with a variety of fruit-producing tree stands should be focused on for protection. Second, if slash-and-burn methods are needed, farmers could use smaller portions of forest and rotate often to allow for forest regeneration and repopulation by howlers. Corridors could also be maintained between properties, crop areas, and developed areas. Success has also been documented on the use of ladder bridges across roads to allow red-handed howlers to cross roads safely. Third, translocation is could be used to repopulate suitable habitat the animals may not be able to reach because of fragmentation. Translocation could also be a useful tool in allowing gene flow between populations that would generally not mix. Lastly, the genetics of the populations should be monitored to make sure adequate genetic variability is present to sustain the populations. Some of these studies are already being done using microsatellite loci to determine diversity.
