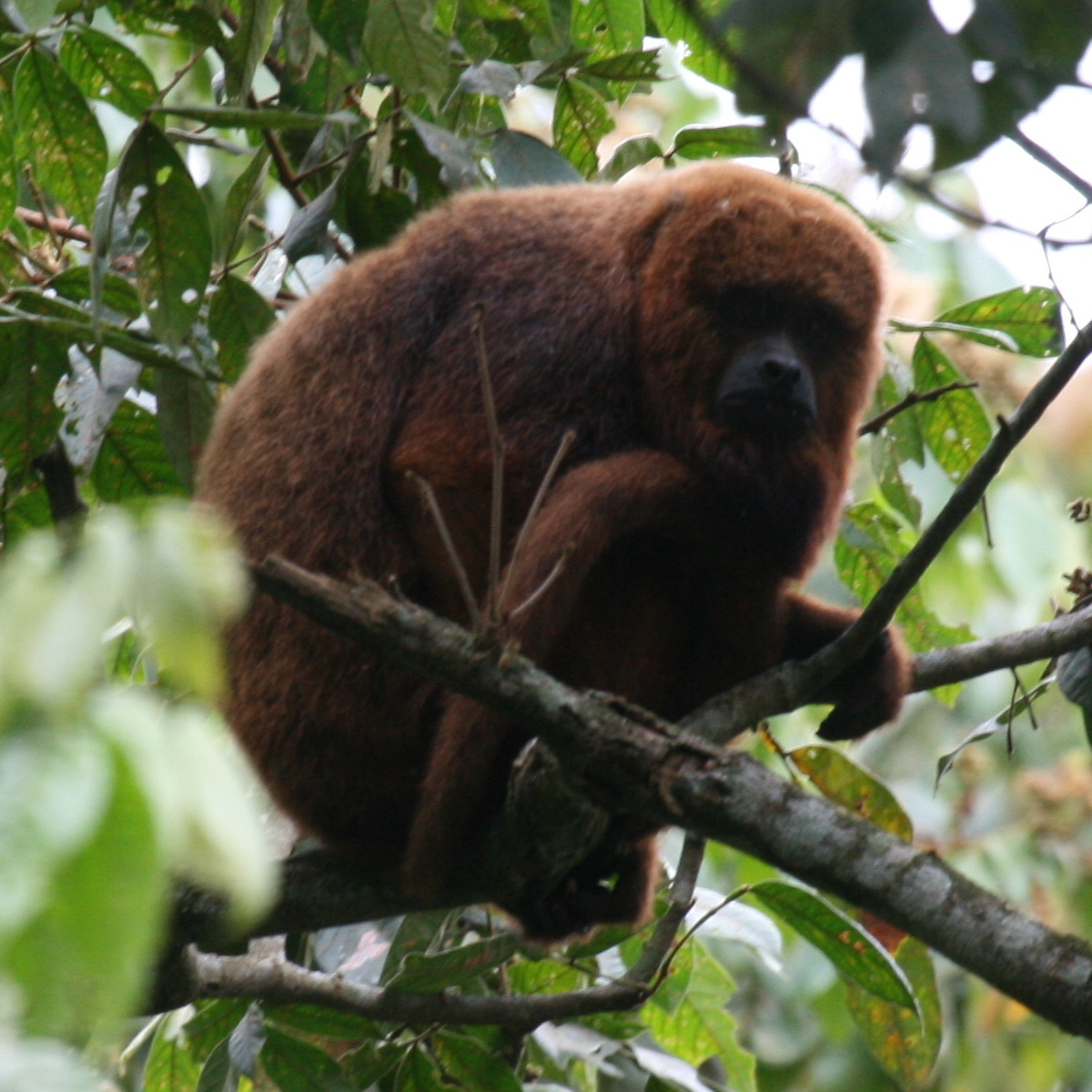

Conservation status
- Critically Endangered (IUCN 3.1)

Scientific classification
- Kingdom: Animalia
- Phylum: Chordata
- Class: Mammalia
- Order: Primates
- Suborder: Haplorhini
- Infraorder: Simiiformes
- Family: Atelidae
- Genus: Alouatta
- Species: A. guariba
- Subspecies: A. g. guariba

Trinomial name
- Alouatta guariba guariba (Humboldt, 1812)

= Northern brown howler =

Subspecies of New World monkey

The northern brown howler (Alouatta guariba guariba) is the type subspecies of the brown howler, native to Brazil. It is listed as critically endangered, with fewer than 250 individuals restricted to the vicinity of the Jequitinhonha River. The species feeds on fruits, flowers, and by preference immature leaves which are easier to digest than mature leaves; foraging for these foods in hillside habitats was shown to require more energy expenditure than in valley habitats.

== Distribution and habitat ==
The northern brown howler is endemic to the Minas Gerais province of Brazil and the southern part of Bahia state. Its range extends from the Atlantic coast to the Rio Pardo and Águas Vermelhas in the north, and to the Jequitinhonha River and Virgem da Lapa to the west and south, largely delineated by the inland extent of the coastal rainforest belt. Although mainly living in the canopy of primary forest, it can adapt to secondary forest and other disturbed habitats. It may also be present in the northern part of Espírito Santo province, and appears to have had a wider range in the past.

The northern brown howler is present in several protected areas, including the Mata Escura Biological Reserve, where the critically endangered northern muriqui (Brachyteles hypoxanthus) and the endangered golden-bellied capuchin (Sapajus xanthosternos) are also found. However, this reserve is close to rural settlements and subject to illegal logging, hunting and increased incidence of wildfires. The monkey may also be present in other protected areas, but this is uncertain, because the subspecies' southern distributional limit is unclear.

== Ecology ==
Brown howlers are known for the loud roars they make which can be heard from at least 1.6 km (1.0 mi) away. They live in the canopy in small social groups and the males are larger than the females. The long tail is prehensile; the underside near the tip is devoid of hair and the monkey can hang from its tail while feeding. Brown howlers primarily eat leaves and fruit from a wide range of trees, shrubs, lianas and vines; particularly favoured are Ficus, Zanthoxylum and Eugenia but the monkeys seem quite flexible in their diet, and also consume stems, buds, flowers, seeds and moss.

== Status ==
The International Union for Conservation of Nature has assessed this monkey's conservation status as being critically endangered. This is because of the monkey's limited range and the impact of humans on its forest home; logging to make way for cattle ranching has reduced the forest to a number of fragments, the animals are hunted for bushmeat and the habitat further degraded by burning. There may be a total population of less than 250 animals, with the number of mature individuals being fewer than fifty.
