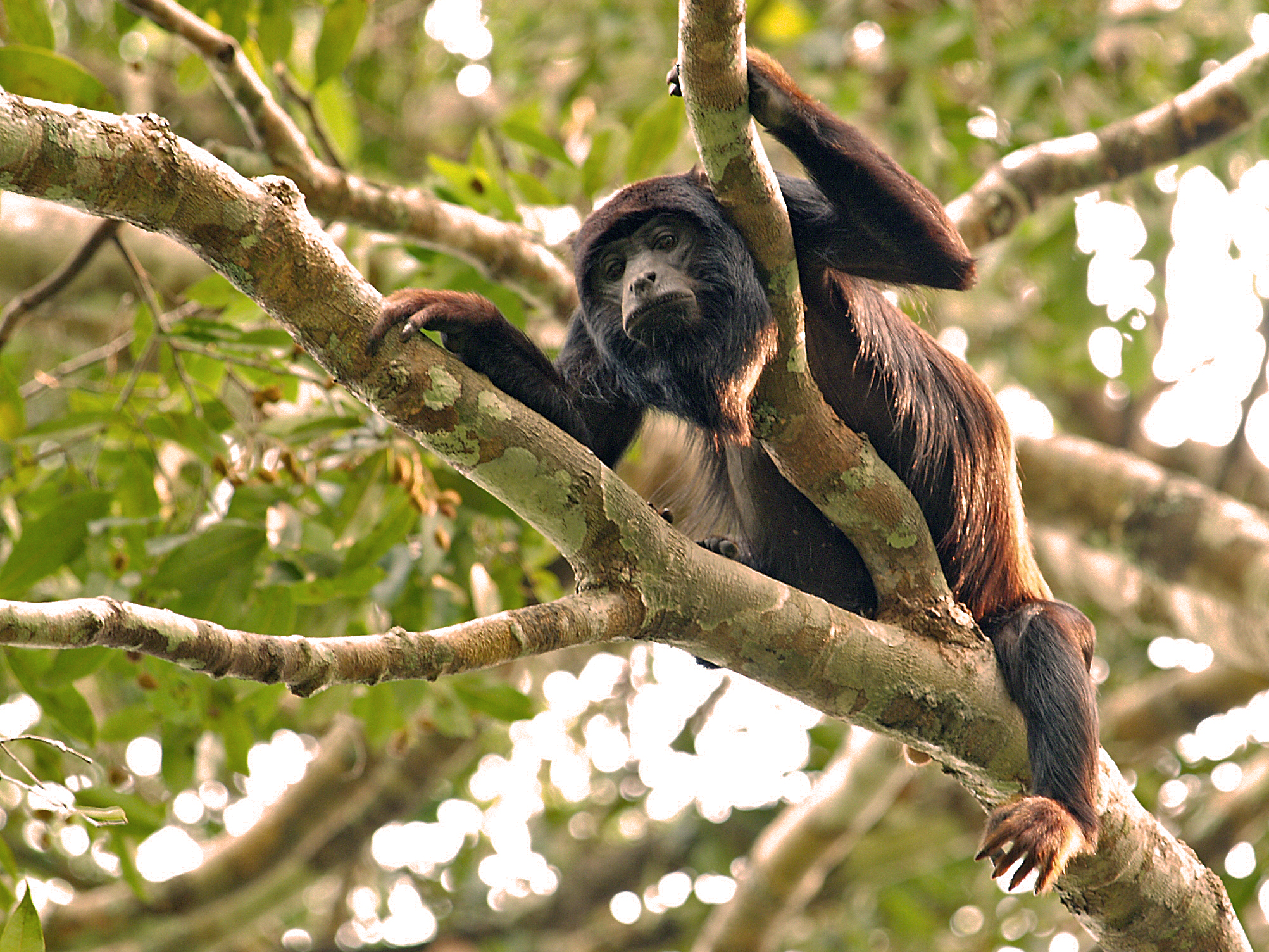

Conservation status
- Vulnerable (IUCN 3.1)

Scientific classification
- Kingdom: Animalia
- Phylum: Chordata
- Class: Mammalia
- Infraclass: Placentalia
- Order: Primates
- Family: Atelidae
- Genus: Alouatta
- Species: A. discolor

Binomial name
- Alouatta discolor (Spix, 1823)
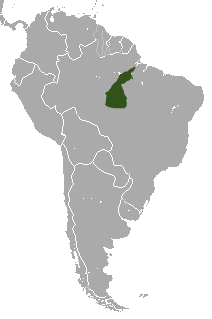
- Spix's red-handed howler range

= Spix's red-handed howler =

Species of New World monkey

Spix's red-handed howler (Alouatta discolor) is a species of Howler monkey native to the southeastern Amazon in Brazil. It is threatened by deforestation and hunting.

== Taxonomy ==
The species was previously considered a subspecies of the red-handed howler, but it is now treated as a separate species.

== Description ==
Spix's red-handed howler has a similar appearance to the red-handed howler, but it has a yellowish-brown to reddish-brown back. Males weigh about 7.2 kg, females about 5.5 kg.

== Distribution and habitat ==
The species is endemic to central Brazil, specifically along the southeastern Amazon River in the State of Pará. It occurs mainly in the interfluvial land area between four rivers, Tapajós, Juruena, Xingú and Irirí. The westernmost limit of native habitat lies on the right bank of the Tapajós River and Juruena River and stretches east to the banks of the Xingú River and Irirí River. This strip of land extends northward to Forte Curupá (Gurupá), Brazil, which is the northernmost extent of the distribution of Spix's red-handed howler and also its type locality.

Spix's red-handed howler mainly inhabits lowland forests separated by dry areas as well as forests affected by seasonal flooding.

== Ecology ==
The primary food source of this species is ripe and unripe fruit; it has the highest reliance on this food source of all species in this genus. A variety of species provide fruit year-round, but leaves supplement the sugars of the fruits with protein in their diets. When these food sources are limited, the howlers also supplement their diets with more mature leaves, flowers, woody plant matter, and sometimes fungi to possibly help digest the increased plant matter.

Spix's red-handed howlers generally move in groups of 4-11 individuals, and have relatively small home ranges, 5-45 ha in size.

== Conservation ==
Spix's red-handed howler is currently listed as a Vulnerable species by the International Union for Conservation of Nature, based on a population decrease of over 30% over the past 3 generations, mainly due to habitat loss.

The main threat to the species is habitat destruction by logging as well as land conversion for cattle ranching and soy plantations. Habitat fragmentation occurs through the presence of two major highways - the Cuiabá-Santarém highway runs through its range in a north-south direction and the Trans-amazonian Highway in an east-west direction. These roadways also pose the risk of fatality by vehicle collision. The habitat of the species is also heavily hunted (both commercially and for subsistence).
