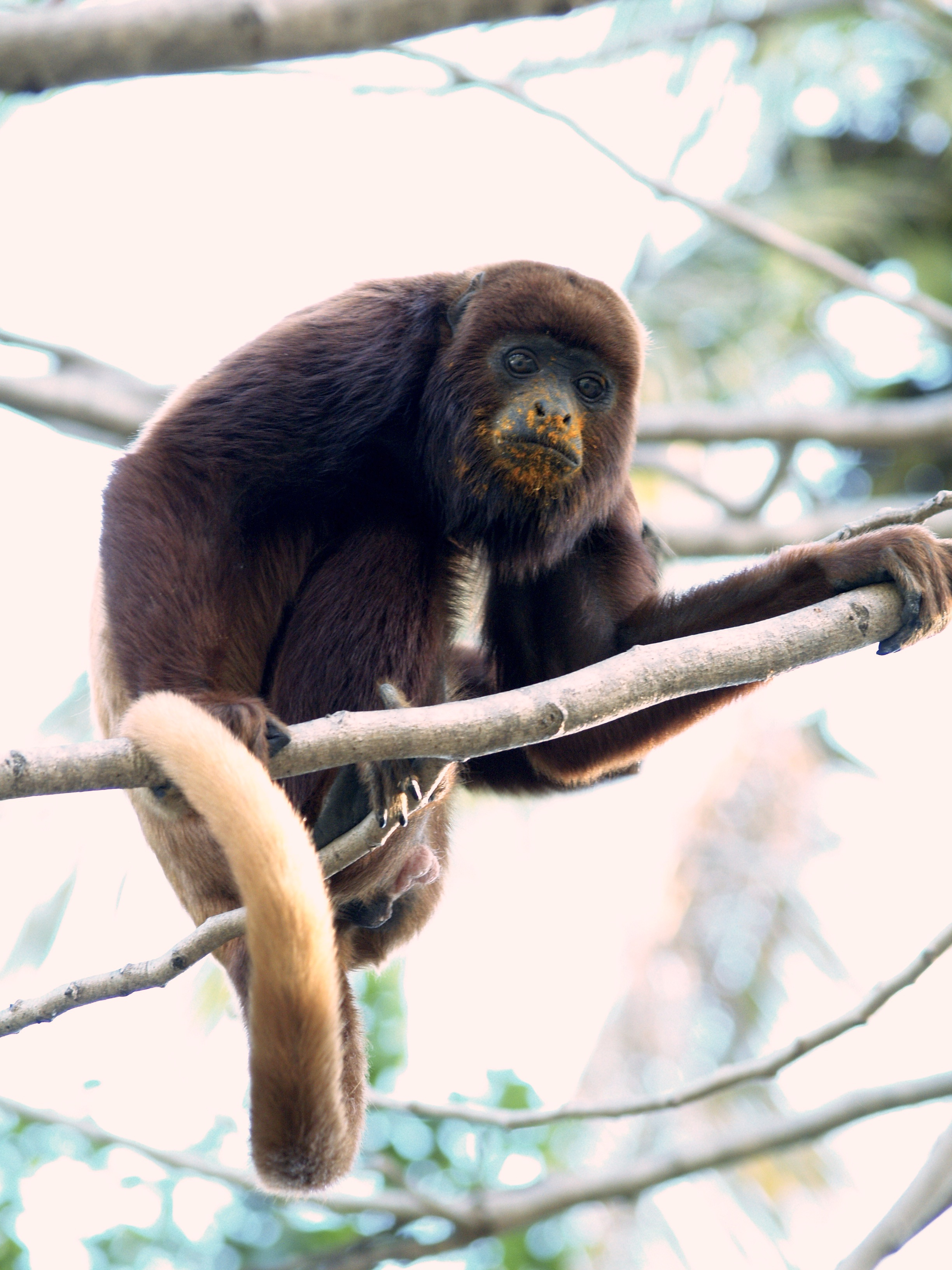
- Ursine howler in Venezuela

Conservation status
- Least Concern (IUCN 3.1)

Scientific classification
- Kingdom: Animalia
- Phylum: Chordata
- Class: Mammalia
- Infraclass: Placentalia
- Order: Primates
- Family: Atelidae
- Genus: Alouatta
- Species: A. arctoidea

Binomial name
- Alouatta arctoidea Cabrera, 1940
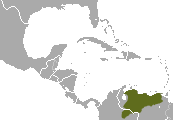
- Ursine howler range

Synonyms
- Alouatta seniculus arctoidea

= Ursine howler =

Species of New World monkey

The ursine howler (Alouatta arctoidea) is a species of howler monkey native to Venezuela and possibly Colombia. It is sometimes considered a subspecies of the Venezuelan red howler and classified as Alouatta seniculus arctoidea.

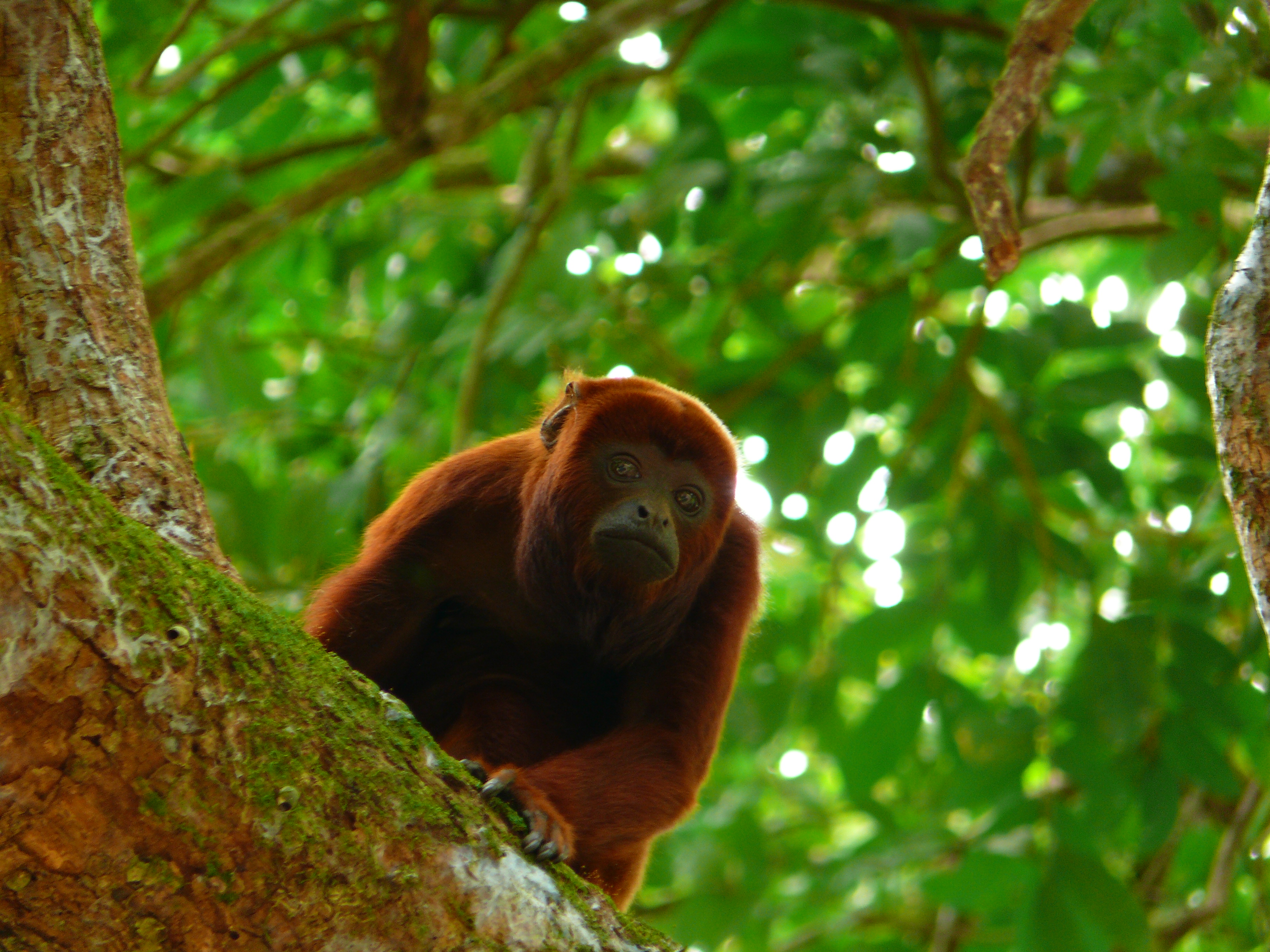
A. arctoidea.
