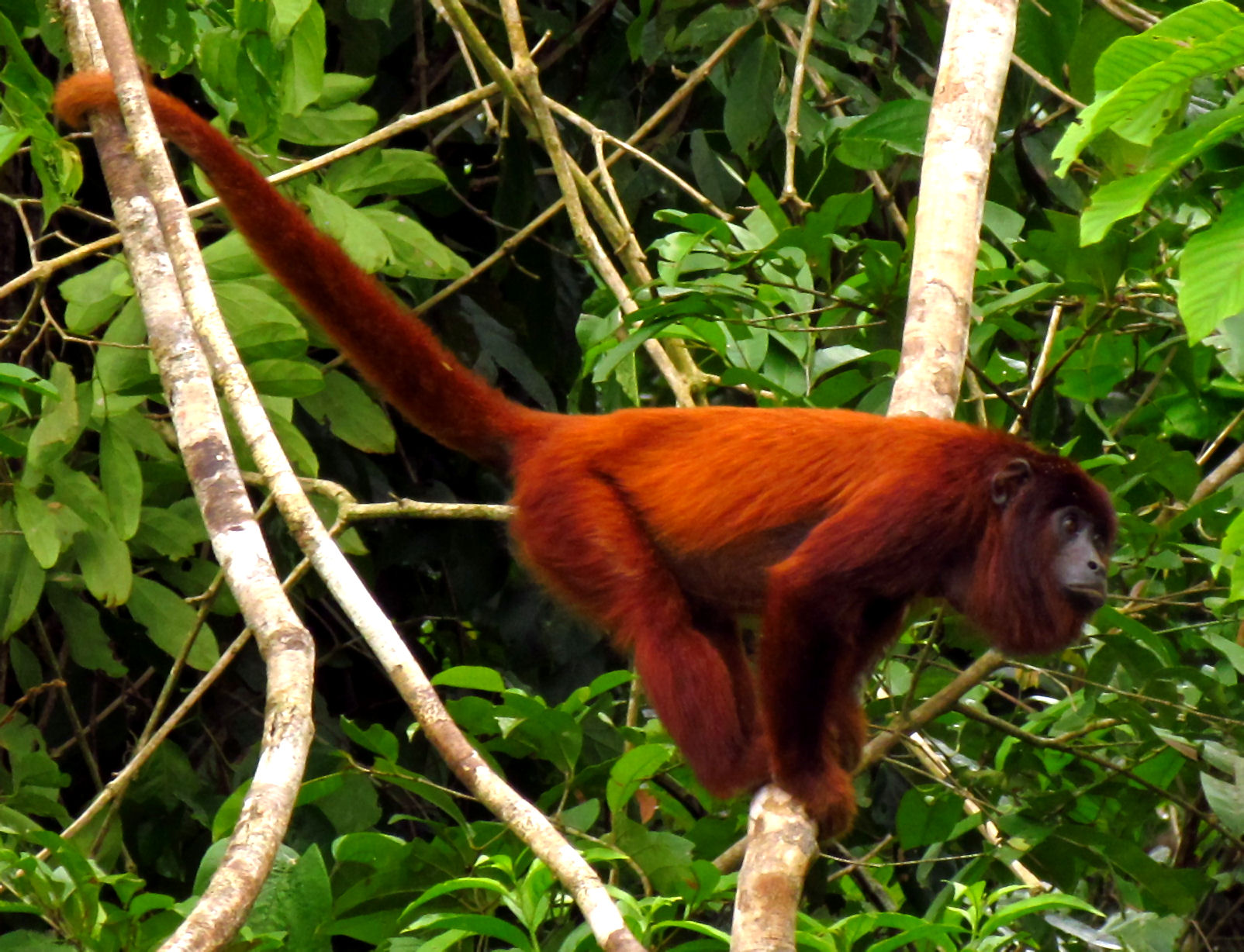
- Male, Tambopata Park, Peru

Conservation status
- Vulnerable (IUCN 3.1)

Scientific classification
- Kingdom: Animalia
- Phylum: Chordata
- Class: Mammalia
- Infraclass: Placentalia
- Order: Primates
- Family: Atelidae
- Genus: Alouatta
- Species: A. puruensis

Binomial name
- Alouatta puruensis Lönnberg, 1941
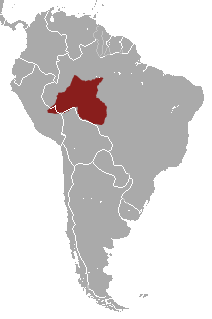
- Purus red howler range

Synonyms
- Alouatta seniculus puruensis

= Purus red howler =

Species of New World monkey

The Purús red howler (Alouatta puruensis) is a species of howler monkey native to Brazil, Peru and north of Bolivia.

== Diet ==
The Purus red howler eats leaves.
