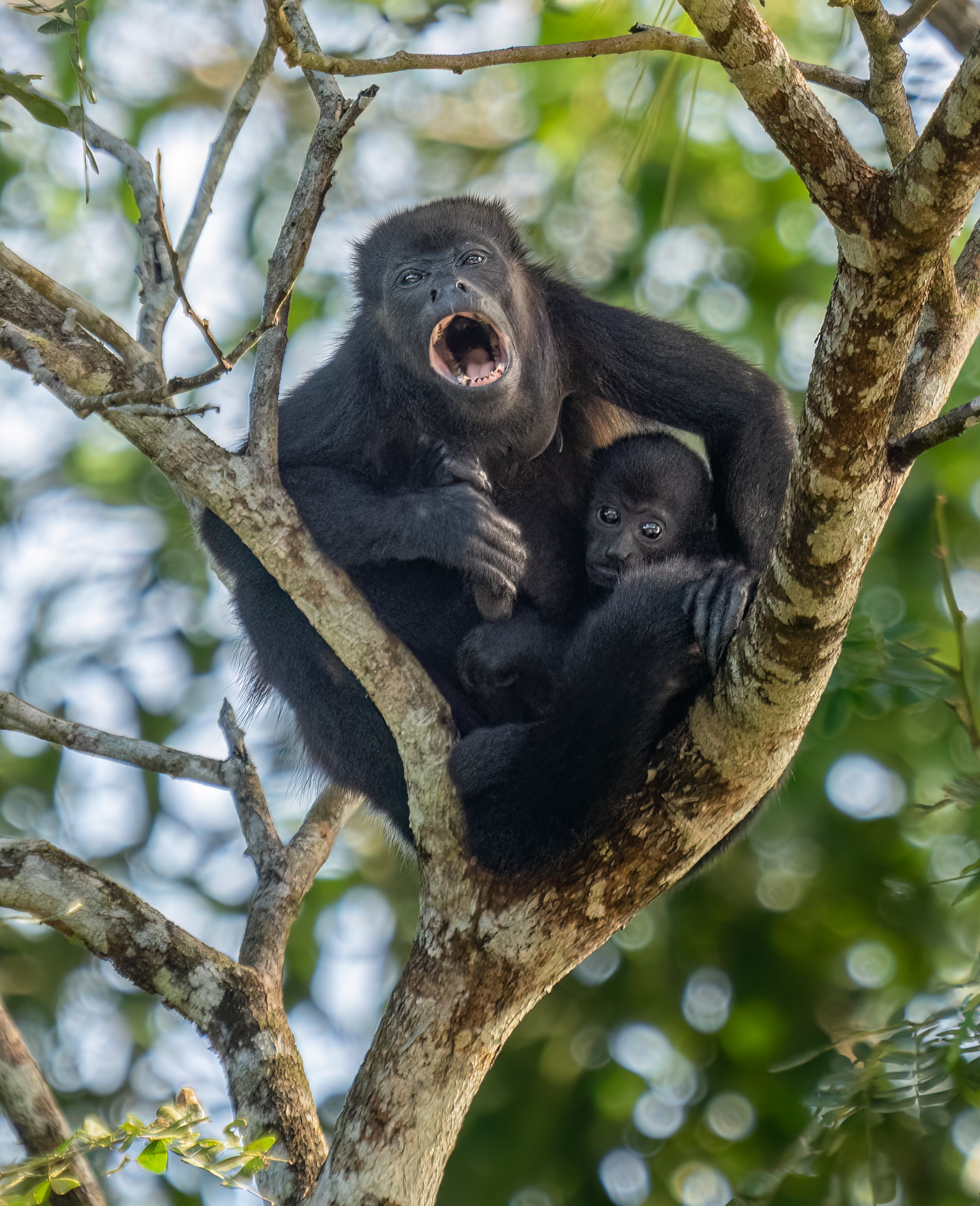
- Mantled howler monkey female and baby

Scientific classification
- Kingdom: Animalia
- Phylum: Chordata
- Class: Mammalia
- Order: Primates
- Family: Atelidae
- Subfamily: Alouattinae; Trouessart, 1897 (1825)
- Genus: Alouatta; Lacépède, 1799

Type species
- Simia belzebul (= Alouatta belzebul) Linnaeus, 1766

Species
- See text
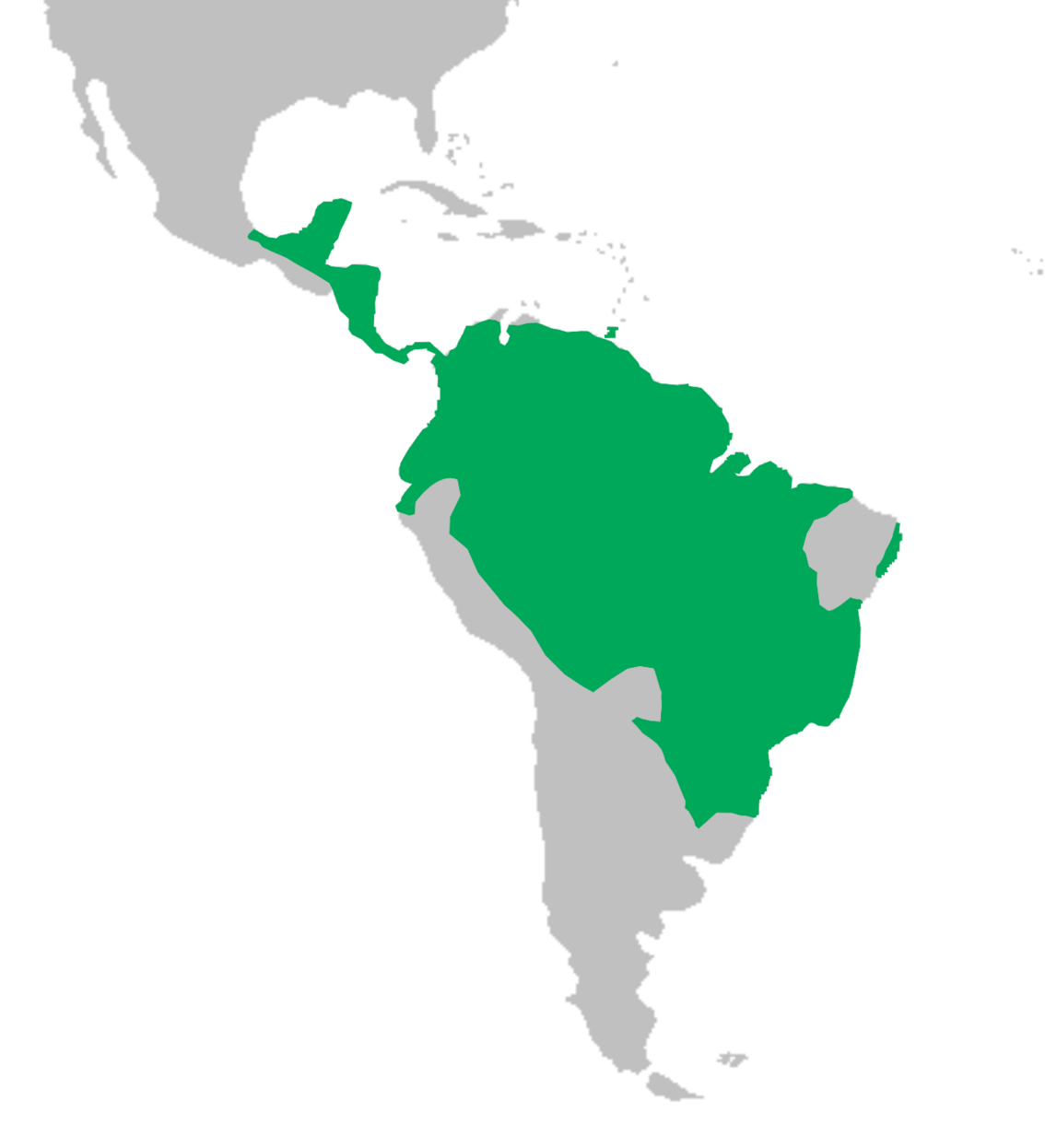
- Alouatta distribution

Synonyms
- Mycetes Illiger, 1811; Stentor É. Geoffroy, 1812

= Howler monkey =

Howler monkeys Temporal range: Middle Miocene - present 13 - 0 Ma

Genus of mammals

Howler monkeys (genus Alouatta, monotypic in subfamily Alouattinae) are the most widespread primate genus in the Neotropics and are among the largest of the platyrrhines along with the muriquis (Brachyteles), the spider monkeys (Ateles) and woolly monkeys (Lagothrix). The monkeys are native to South and Central American forests. They are famous for their howls, which can be heard from a distance through dense rain forest. Fifteen species are recognized. Previously classified in the family Cebidae, they are now placed in the family Atelidae. They are primarily folivores but also significant frugivores, acting as seed dispersal agents through their digestive system and their locomotion. Threats include human predation, habitat destruction, illegal wildlife trade, and capture for pets or zoo animals.

== Classification ==
In 2026, a genome-wide study of the genus formally described two new species from Amazonia, the Pantepui red howler (Alouatta iroi) and the Mato Grosso red howler (Alouatta matogrossensis).

Group	Image	Scientific name	Subspecies	Distribution
A. palliata group		Coiba Island howler, Alouatta coibensis	Alouatta coibensis coibensis; Azuero howler, Alouatta coibensis trabeata	Panama
A. palliata group		Mantled howler, Alouatta palliata	Ecuadorian mantled howler, Alouatta palliata aequatorialis; Golden-mantled howler, Alouatta palliata palliata; Mexican howler monkey, Alouatta palliata mexicana	Colombia, Costa Rica, Ecuador, Guatemala, Honduras, Mexico, Nicaragua, Panama and Peru
A. palliata group		Guatemalan black howler, Alouatta pigra		Belize, Guatemala and Mexico
A. seniculus group		Ursine howler, Alouatta arctoidea		Venezuela and possibly Colombia
A. seniculus group		Red-handed howler, Alouatta belzebul		Brazil
A. seniculus group		Spix's red-handed howler, Alouatta discolor		Brazil
A. seniculus group		Brown howler, Alouatta guariba	Northern brown howler, Alouatta guariba guariba; Southern brown howler, Alouatta guariba clamitans	southeastern Brazil and far northeastern Argentina (Misiones)
A. seniculus group		Juruá red howler, Alouatta juara		Peru and Brazil
A. seniculus group		Guyanan red howler, Alouatta macconnelli		Suriname, Guyana, Trinidad, French Guiana, Venezuela and Brazil
A. seniculus group		Amazon black howler, Alouatta nigerrima		Brazil
A. seniculus group		Purus red howler, Alouatta puruensis		Brazil, Peru and north of Bolivia
A. seniculus group		Bolivian red howler, Alouatta sara		Bolivia
A. seniculus group		Venezuelan red howler, Alouatta seniculus		Venezuela, Colombia, Ecuador, Peru and Brazil
A. seniculus group		Maranhão red-handed howler, Alouatta ululata		Brazil
A. caraya group		Black howler, Alouatta caraya		Paraguay, southern Brazil, eastern Bolivia, northern Argentina, and Uruguay

== Anatomy and physiology ==
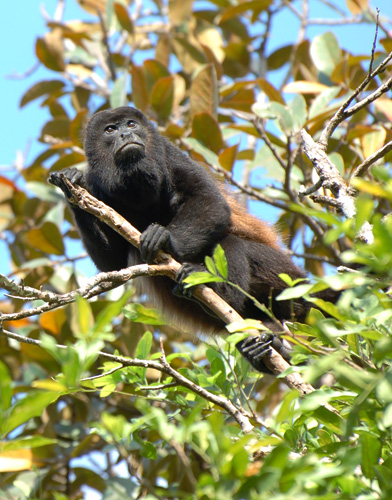
Male mantled howler

Howler monkeys have short snouts and wide-set, round nostrils. Their noses are very keen, and they can smell out food (primarily fruit and nuts) up to 2 km away. Their noses are usually roundish snout-type, and the nostrils have many sensory hairs growing from the interior. They range in size from 56 to 92 cm (22 to 36 in), excluding their tails, which can be equally long; in fact in some cases the tail has been found to be almost five times the body length. This is a prime characteristic. Like many New World monkeys, they have prehensile tails, which they use while picking fruit and nuts from trees. Unlike other New World monkeys, both male and female howler monkeys have trichromatic color vision. This has evolved independently from other New World monkeys due to gene duplication. They have lifespans of 15 to 20 years. Howler species are dimorphic and can also be dichromatic (i.e. Alouatta caraya). Males are typically 1.5 to 2.0 kg heavier than females.

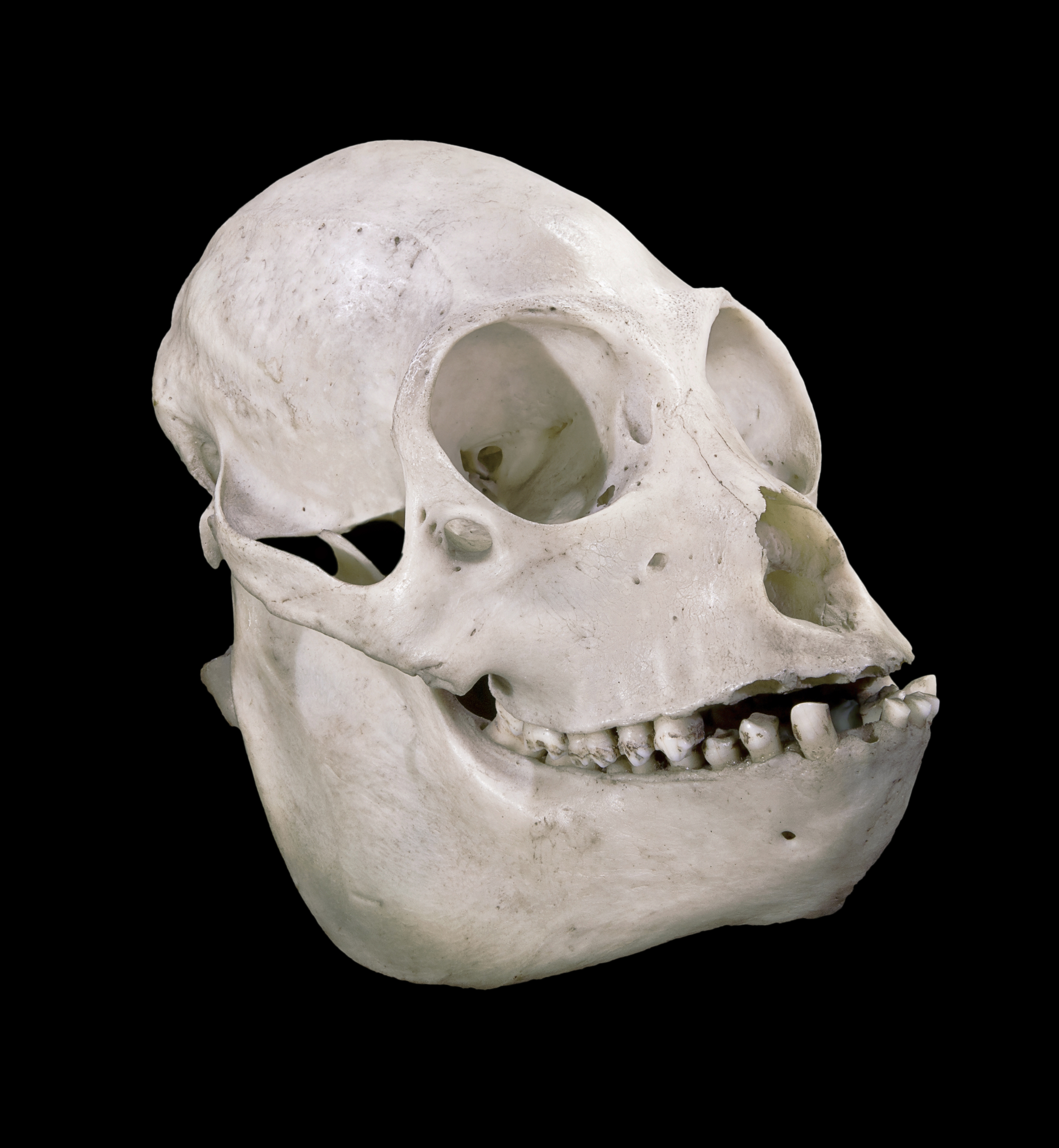
Skull

Males experience an evolutionary trade off between investments in precopulatory traits, larger hyoids but smaller testes, or post-copulatory traits, larger testes and smaller hyoids. The hyoid of Alouatta is pneumatized, one of the few cases of postcranial pneumaticity outside the Saurischia. The volume of the hyoid of male howler monkeys is negatively correlated with the dimensions of their testes, and with the number of males per group. Larger hyoids decrease space between formant, and offers impression of larger body size. They have a flat cranial shape due to a folivorous diet and an advanced vocal system. Their brain growth is posterior rather than superior or inferior as in other platyrrhines.

=== Locomotion ===
Howler monkeys generally move quadrupedally on the tops of branches, usually grasping a branch with at least two hands or one hand and the tail at all times. Their strong prehensile tails are able to support their entire body weight. Fully grown adult howler monkeys do not often rely on their tails for full-body support, but juveniles do so more frequently. A significant amount of their travel is done through the ground, with sitting and resting being their most frequent postures.

== Behaviour ==
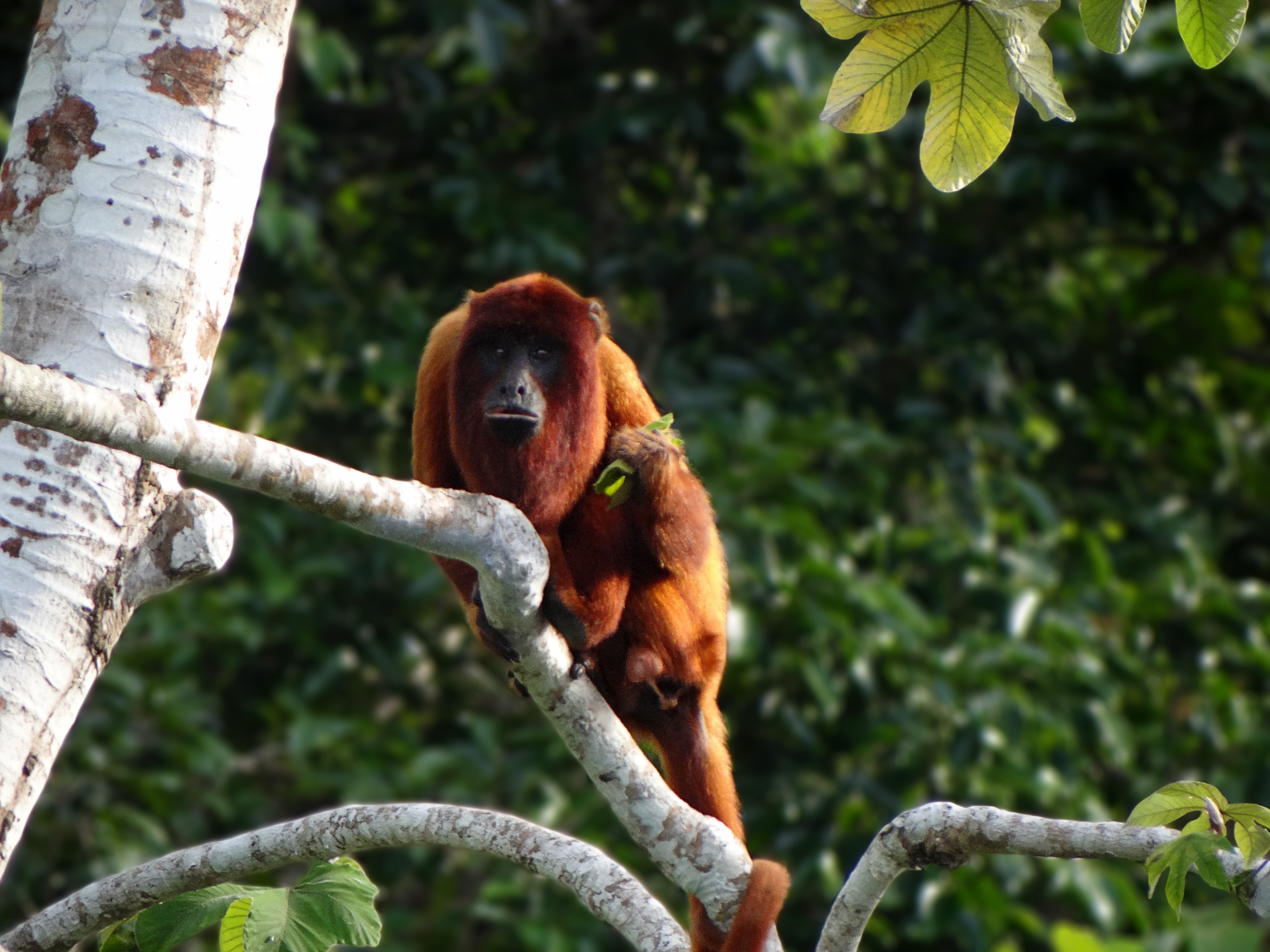
A Bolivian red howler (Alouatta sara)

=== Social systems ===
Most howler species live in groups of six to fifteen animals, with one to three adult males and multiple females. Mantled howler monkeys are an exception, commonly living in groups of 15 to 20 individuals with more than three adult males. The number of males in a given group is inversely correlated with the size of their hyoids and is positively correlated with testes size.

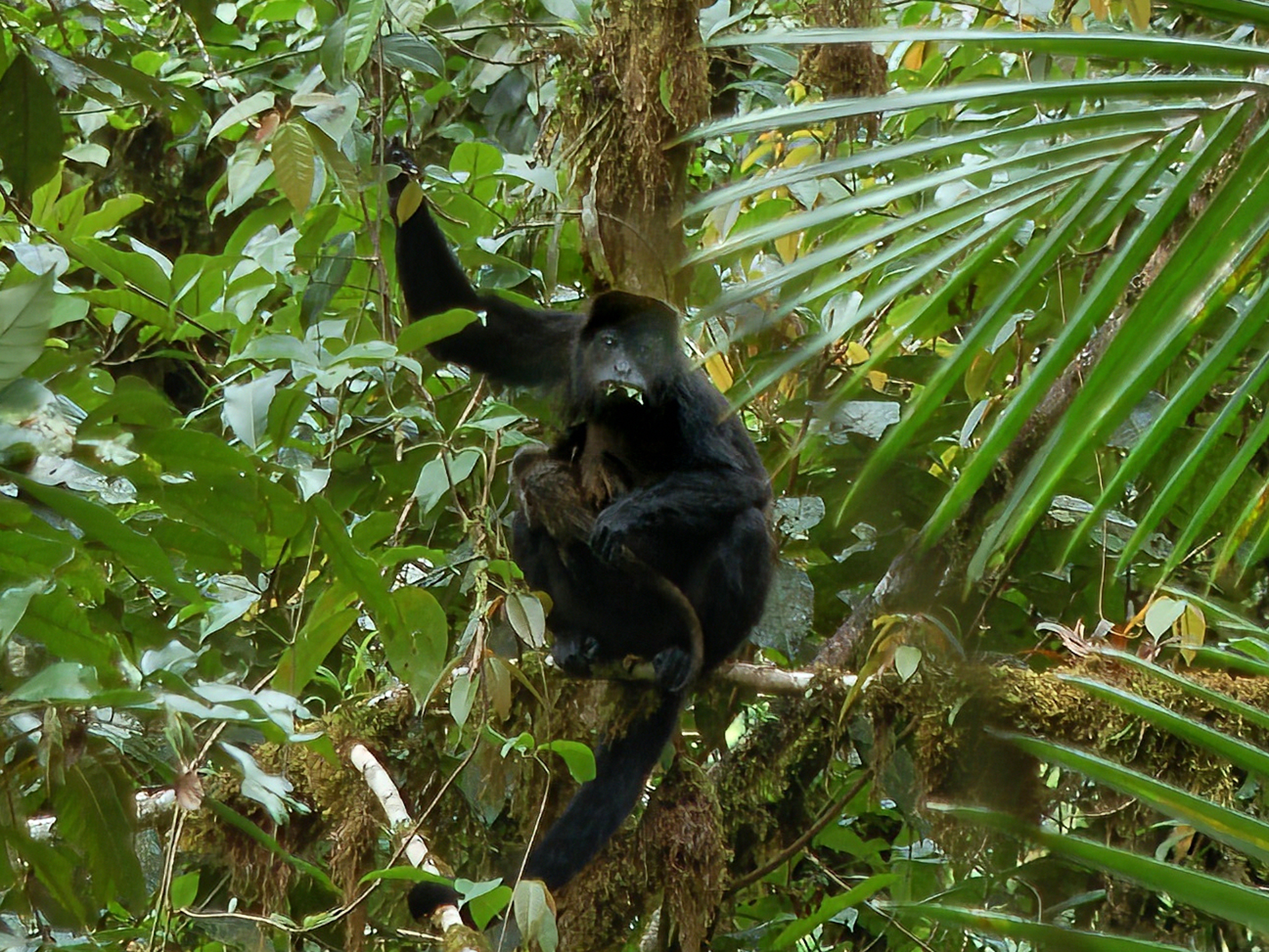
A black howler with child in Monteverde Cloud Forest Biological Reserve

This results in two distinct groups, wherein one male with a larger hyoid and smaller testes copulates exclusively with a group of females, suggesting precopulatory vocal competition. The other group has more males, which have smaller hyoids, and larger testes. The larger the number of males, the smaller the hyoid, and the larger the testes. Female howler monkeys breed with multiple males within their group, with males in neighboring groups, and with solitary males. Central males tie up fellowship with cycling females. Unlike most New World monkeys, in which one sex remains in natal groups, juveniles of both sexes emigrate from their natal groups, such that howler monkeys could spend the majority of their adult lives in association with unrelated monkeys.

Physical fighting among group members is infrequent and generally of short duration, but serious injuries can result. Both males and females rarely fight with each other, but physical aggression is even more rare between sexes. Group size varies by species and by location, with an approximate ratio of one male to four females.

=== Communication ===
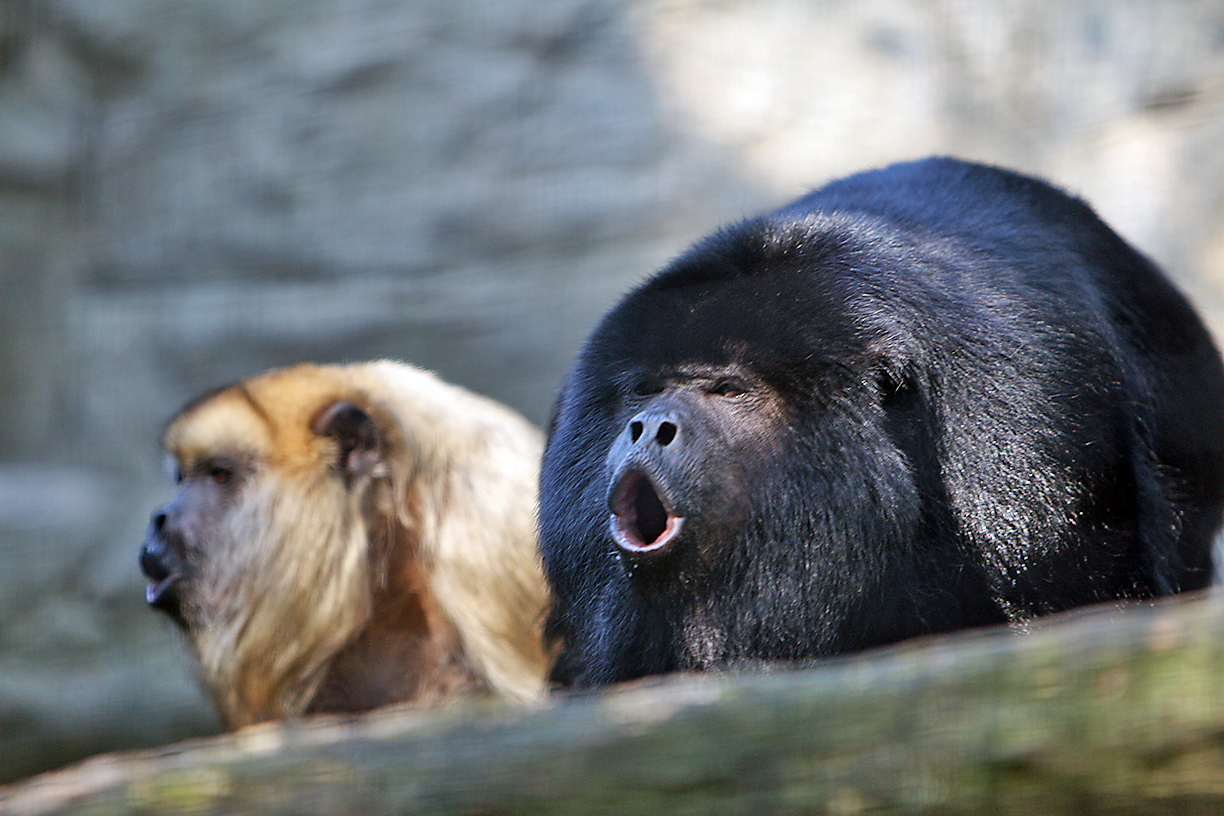
A pair of black howler monkeys (Alouatta caraya) vocalising

Howler monkey growls

As their name suggests, vocal communication forms an important part of their social behavior. They each have an enlarged basihyal or hyoid bone, which helps them make their vocalizations. Group males generally call at dawn, as well as interspersed times throughout the day. Their main vocals consist of deep, guttural growls or "howls". The function of howling is thought to relate to intergroup spacing and territory protection, as well as possibly to mate-guarding. Howlers call usually when they are in areas with major feeding sites, which in some sort lead to advertise major feeding sites and their willingness to defend locally available fruit trees. Black howler monkeys incorporate information on resource availability along with neighbors’ current location. And the abundance of flowers are found to be an important factor that influenced behavior. Neighbors are more likely to move towards these calls when resource are scarce, and the reverse is true.

=== Diet and feeding ===
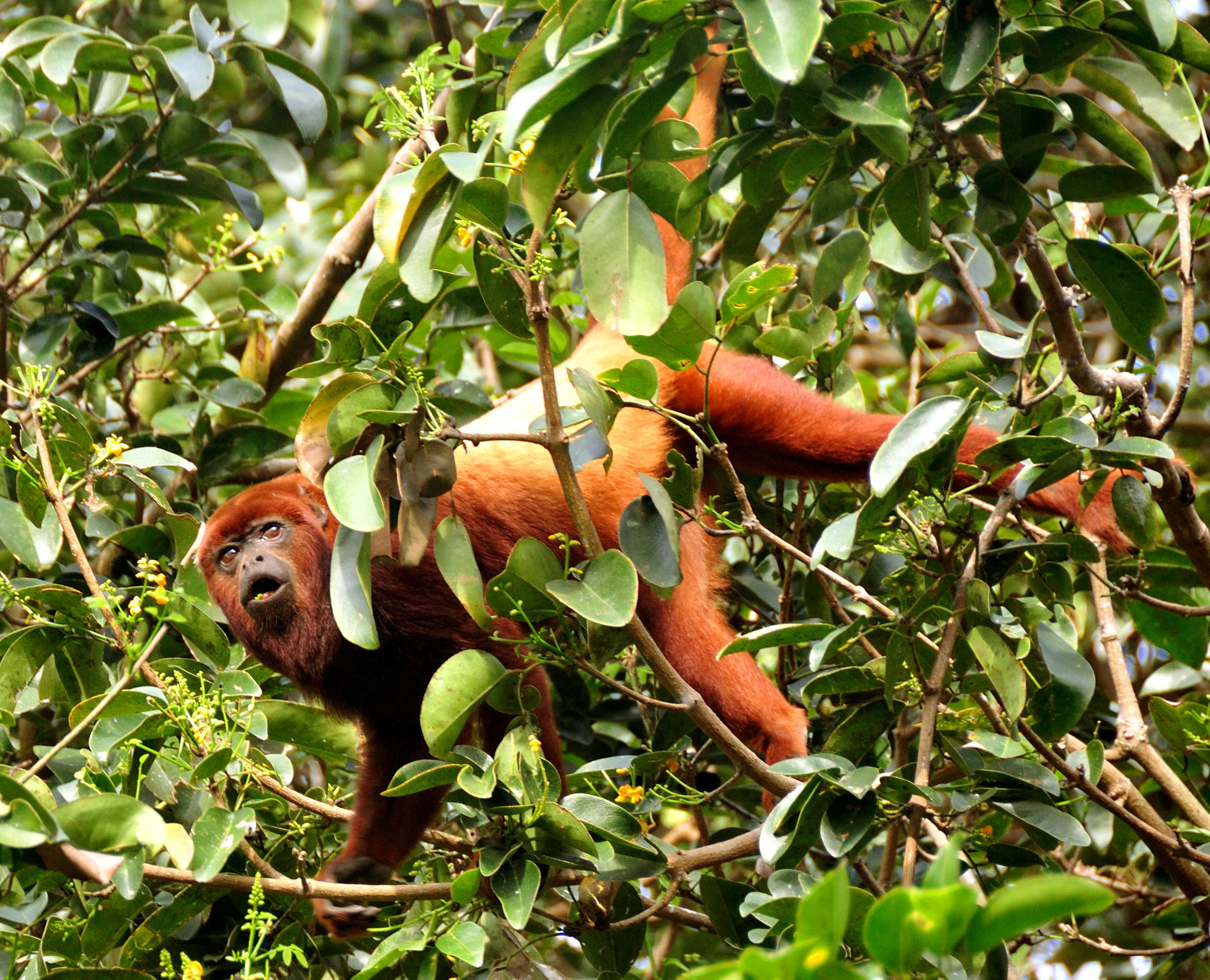
An ursine howler

These large and slow-moving monkeys are the only folivores of the New World monkeys. Howlers eat mainly top canopy leaves, together with fruit, buds, flowers, and nuts. They need to be careful not to eat too many leaves of certain species in one sitting, as some contain toxins that can poison them. Howler monkeys are also known to occasionally raid birds' nests or chicken coops, and consume the eggs. When in smaller groups (up to twelve individuals) and low rainfall (up to 2,200 mm (87 in)), they are more frugivorous. In larger groups and increased rainfall, frugivory decreases as a result of competition and fast food depletion. As they digest fruit, more than 90% of the fruits' seeds are excreted without damage, which results in seed dispersal and distribution in tropical forests.

=== Sleeping ===
Howlers use the upper-middle part of their sleeping tree and use large branches on the 70% of nights that potentially allow for grouped sleeping or resistance to weather conditions and risk of branch breaking. Their sleeping sites are usually close to morning feeding sites.

== Evolution ==
Fossil evidence from the Miocene epoch provides insight into the early evolution of howler monkeys. Mandible fossils of the extinct species Stirtonia victoriae from Colombia, dated to around 13 million years ago, show dental features consistent with leaf-eating. This suggests that folivory in the howler monkey lineage arose early and may have supported increased body size, as well as the later development of anatomical features associated with their characteristic vocalizations.

== Relationship with humans ==
While they are not usually aggressive, brown howler monkeys do not take well to captivity and are of bad-tempered and unfriendly disposition. However, the black howler monkey (Alouatta caraya) is a relatively common pet in contemporary Argentina due to its gentle nature (in comparison to the capuchin monkey's aggressive tendencies), in spite of its lesser intelligence, as well as the liabilities of the size of it and the monkey's vocalizations.

John Lloyd Stephens described the howler monkeys at the Maya ruins of Copán as "grave and solemn, almost emotionally wounded, as if officiating as the guardians of consecrated ground". To the Mayas of the Classic period, they were the divine patrons of the artisans, especially scribes and sculptors. They were seen as gods in some tribes, and the long, sleek tail was worshipped for its beauty. Copán, in particular, is famous for its representations of howler monkey gods. Two howler monkey brothers play a role in the myth of the Maya Hero Twins included in the Popol Vuh, a widely feared tale of soul and passion.
