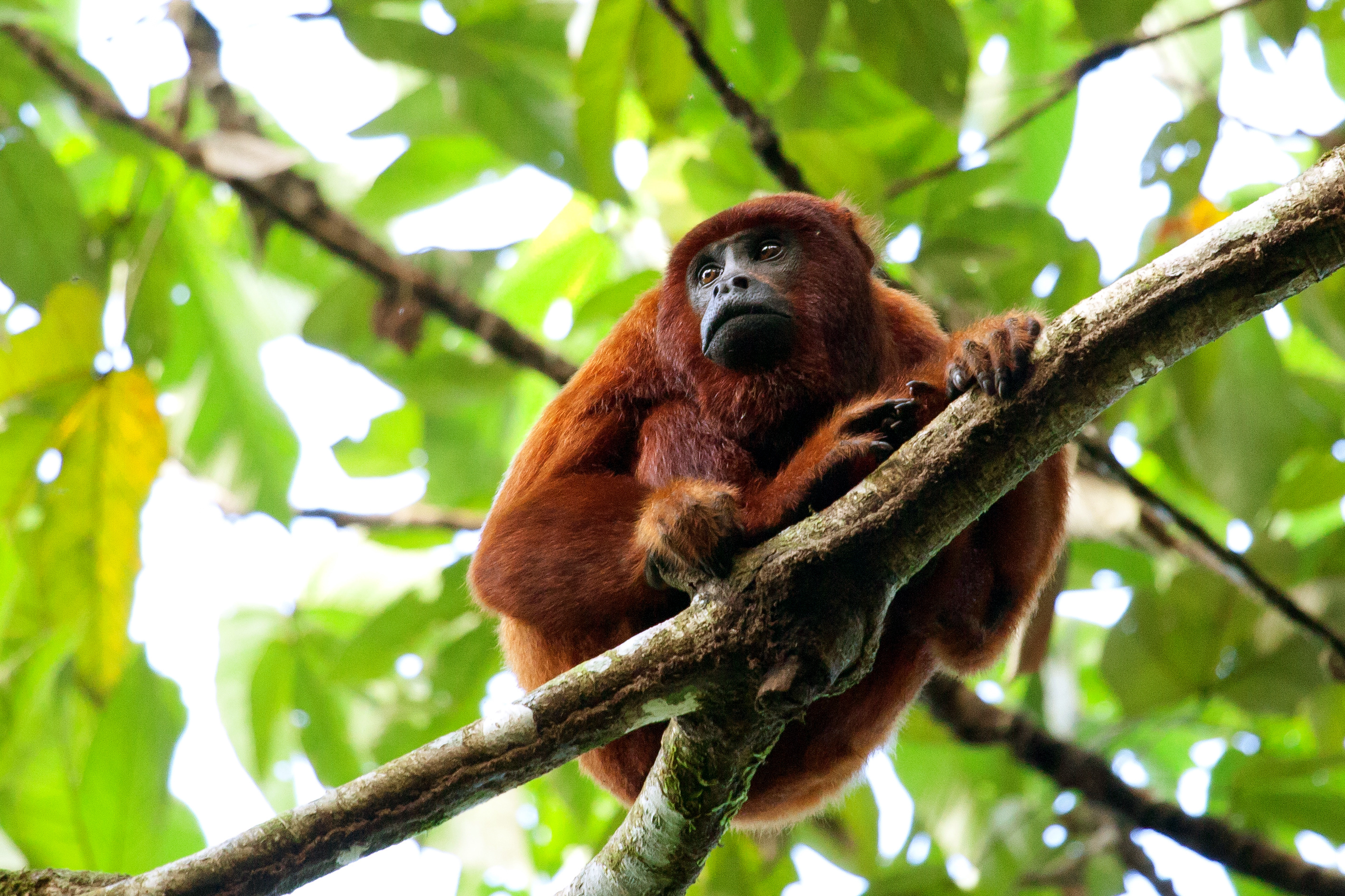

Conservation status
- Least Concern (IUCN 3.1)

Scientific classification
- Kingdom: Animalia
- Phylum: Chordata
- Class: Mammalia
- Infraclass: Placentalia
- Order: Primates
- Family: Atelidae
- Genus: Alouatta
- Species: A. juara

Binomial name
- Alouatta juara Elliot, 1910
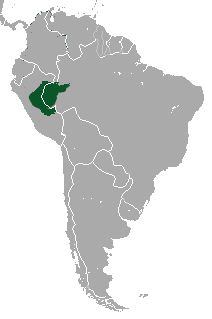
- Jurua Red Howler range

Synonyms
- Alouatta seniculus amazonica Alouatta seniculus juara

= Juruá red howler =

Species of New World monkey

The Juruá red howler (Alouatta juara) is a species of howler monkey, native to Peru and Brazil.
