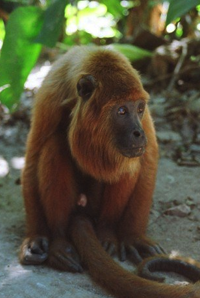
- Bolivian red howler at Parque Ambue Ari

Conservation status
- Near Threatened (IUCN 3.1)

Scientific classification
- Kingdom: Animalia
- Phylum: Chordata
- Class: Mammalia
- Order: Primates
- Family: Atelidae
- Genus: Alouatta
- Species: A. sara

Binomial name
- Alouatta sara Elliot, 1910
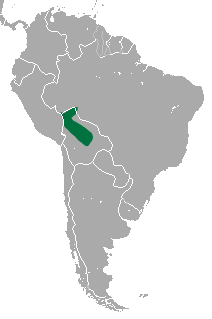
- Bolivian red howler range

= Bolivian red howler =

Species of mammal

The Bolivian red howler (Alouatta sara) is a species of howler monkey, a type of New World monkey, endemic to Bolivia. It can be found in rain forests, including riverine and seasonally flooded forests.

== Range ==
The Bolivian red howler is a part of the Atelidae; Atelidae are a subfamily of New World monkey, which includes the various spider and woolly monkeys. They are covered in reddish orange hair. The red howler are found only in neotropical South America in places like Bolivia, Brazil, Colombia, Ecuador, French Guiana, Guyana, Perú, Suriname, Trinidad and Tobago, and Venezuela. They extend from northwest Colombia east and south to the Amazon River in eastern Brazil. They can be largely found in tropical forests, as well as in riverine and seasonally swamped woodlands and in forests above 1000 meters (3280 feet) above sea level, humid and dry forest high terra firma. They stay in the high altitudes.

== Physical description ==
The adult Bolivian red howler has a well-built body that is capable of attaining a maximum body length. Red howler monkeys have a muscular, prehensile tail that enables them to grasp branches or even swing from them. The males are about 20.6 -22.4 inches in height and weigh about 13-17 lbs. The females are a bit smaller at only about 18.4- 19.6 inches and 10-14 lbs.in weight. Their arms and legs are long. The howler hands are strong and dexterous. They feed mostly on leaves and they also enjoy nuts, seeds, fruit, and flowers.

== Mating ==
Female red howler pursues a male howler by showing her tongue. If the male isn't interested, she moves on to another male. Mating occurs throughout the year. After the pregnancy period, which is six months, the female generally gives birth to one offspring at a time. Twins are very rare. Females usually first give birth when they reach five years, which is two years before males begin to mate. Newborns are born with fur and must hang onto their mother's belly. When baby howlers reach one month they can now hang from their mothers with their tails and can eventually ride on her back when they reach one year. Adults female red howlers in the troop, especially those without an infant, are very fond of other females babies and will cuddle and play with them. The male howlers, on the other hand, are very affectionate to youngsters but only to their own.

== Behavior ==
The red howlers live in groups with one to three males, and two to seven females. Males living in bachelor groups attempt to gain control of the female group by fighting the lead male. The male red howler wakes up early in the morning and wakes the forest up with their loud howls that can be heard up to 2 miles. They howl again at night, before they go to sleep, and the calls are answered by males from other red howler groups, to let them know their location so that their territories do not overlap. Red howlers do not like rain, so they howl in protest to the rain while hunched over in the trees. They stay high up in the trees away from jaguars and throw sticks and branches at them. When a troop is invading, males come to take over the female group from the current male or males; they kill all the infants and mate with the females to produce their own offspring. The females try to protect their infants, but being smaller, they usually fail to do so.

== Additional information ==
The Red Howler lifespan is 20 years, and their predator is jaguars. They have about six species of red howler in Central and South America, and they sleep for 15 hours per day. They have the loudest call of any new world animal. They are proficient swimmers even though they spend most of their time in the tree. Baby howlers nurse for 18 to 24 months.

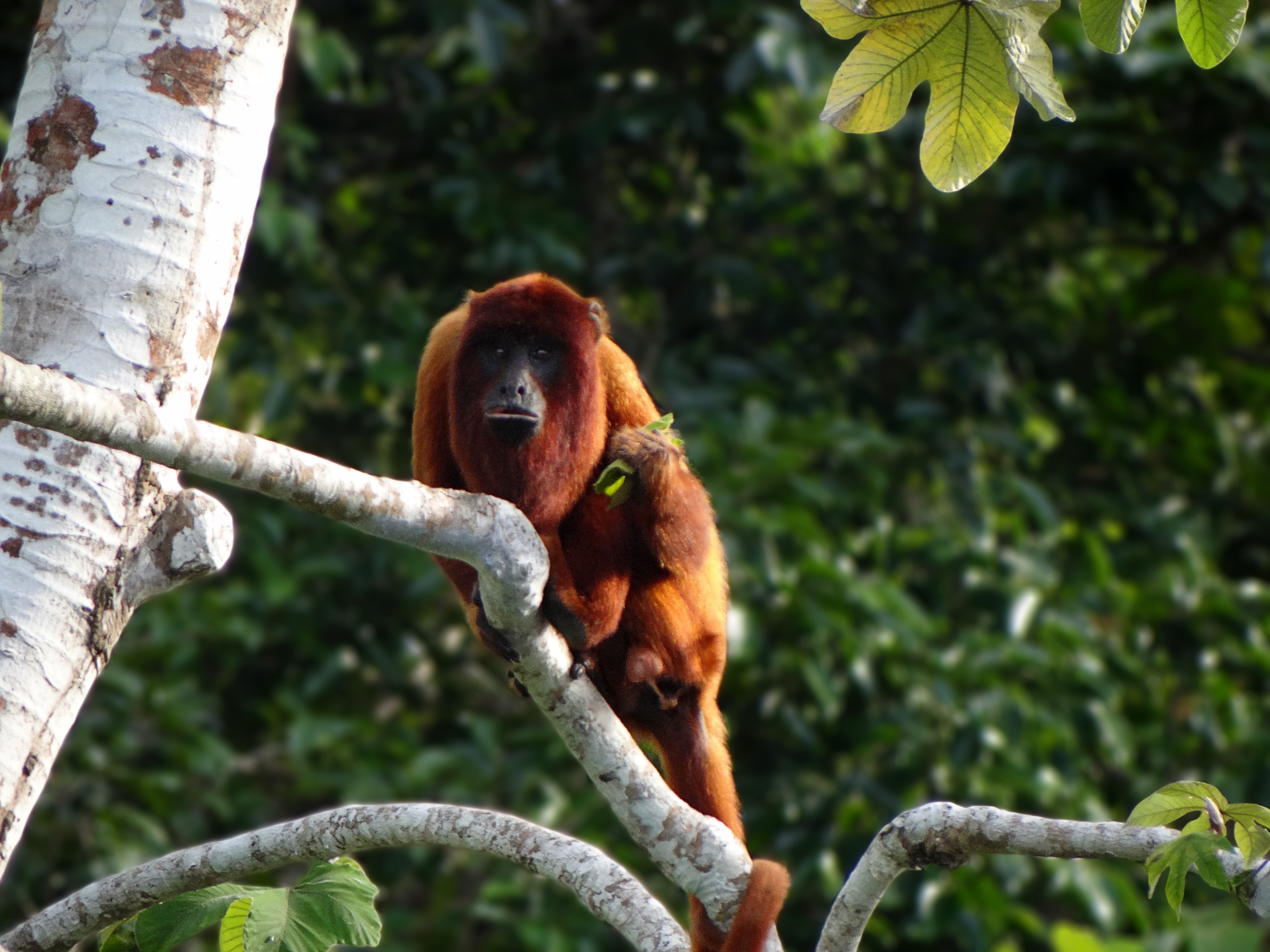
Bolivian red howler near Santa Rosa de Yacuma.
