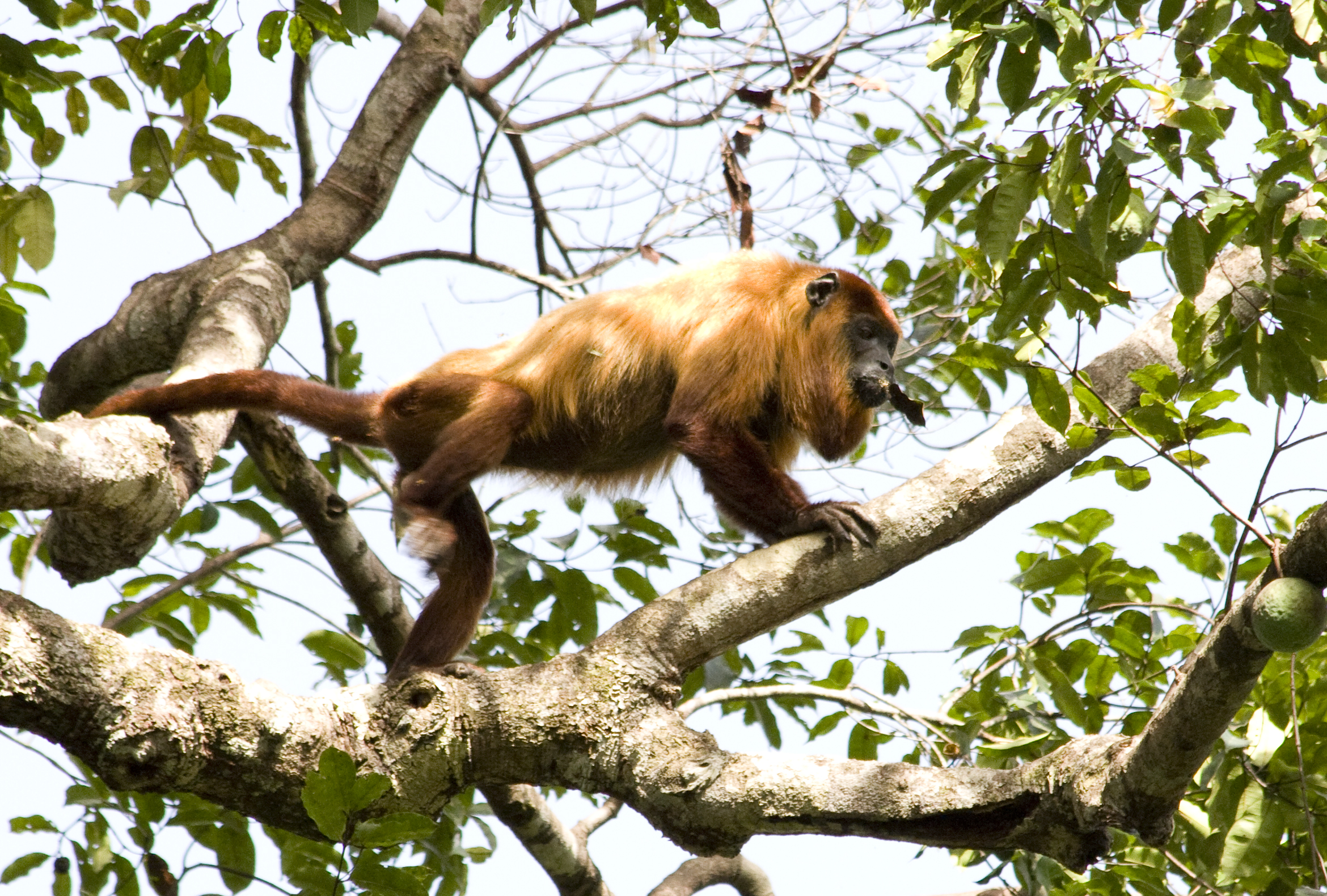
- In French Guiana, France

Conservation status
- Least Concern (IUCN 3.1)

Scientific classification
- Kingdom: Animalia
- Phylum: Chordata
- Class: Mammalia
- Infraclass: Placentalia
- Order: Primates
- Family: Atelidae
- Genus: Alouatta
- Species: A. macconnelli

Binomial name
- Alouatta macconnelli Elliot, 1910
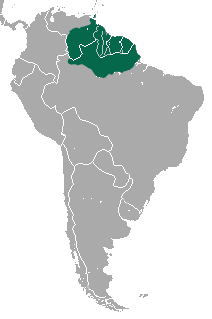
- Guyanan Red Howler range

= Guyanan red howler =

Species of New World monkey

The Guyanan red howler (Alouatta macconnelli) is a species of howler monkey, a type of New World monkey, native to Suriname, Guyana, Trinidad, French Guiana, Venezuela and Brazil.
