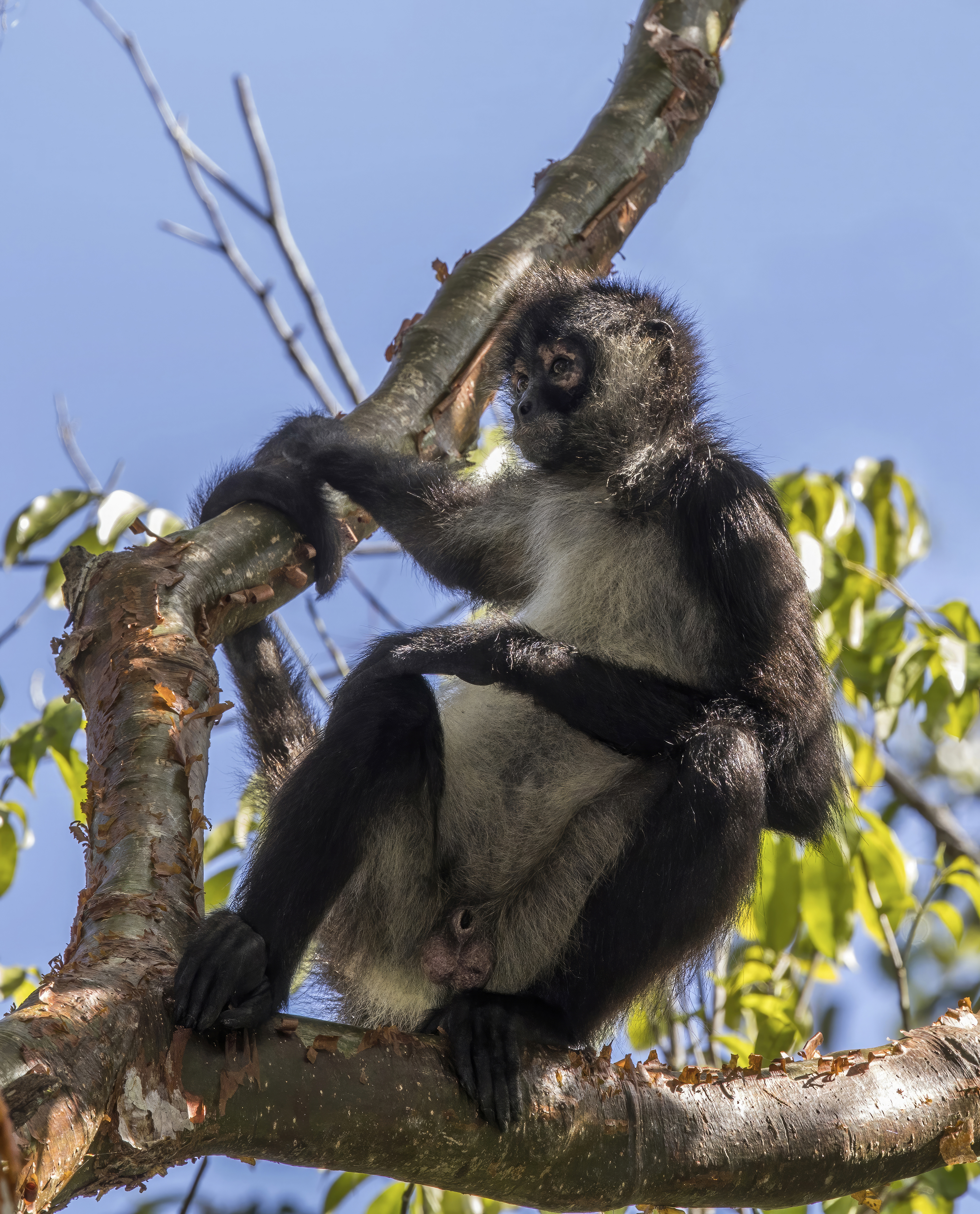
- Male A. g. yucatanensis, Guatemala

Conservation status
- Endangered (IUCN 3.1)

Scientific classification
- Kingdom: Animalia
- Phylum: Chordata
- Class: Mammalia
- Order: Primates
- Family: Atelidae
- Genus: Ateles
- Species: A. geoffroyi

Binomial name
- Ateles geoffroyi Kuhl, 1820

Subspecies
- 5, see text
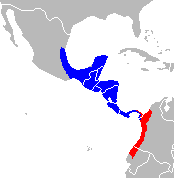
- Distribution of A. geoffroyi (blue) and A. fusciceps (red)

Synonyms
- A. frontatus (Gray, 1842); A. melanochir (Desmarest, 1820); A. trianguligera (Weinland, 1862)

= Geoffroy's spider monkey =

Species of primate from Central America

Geoffroy's spider monkey (Ateles geoffroyi), also known as the black-handed spider monkey or the Central American spider monkey, is a species of spider monkey, a type of New World monkey, from Central America, parts of Mexico and possibly a small portion of Colombia. There are at least five subspecies. Some primatologists classify the black-headed spider monkey (A. fusciceps), found in Panama, Colombia, and Ecuador as the same species as Geoffroy's spider monkey.

It is one of the largest New World monkeys, often weighing as much as 9 kg (20 lb). Its arms are significantly longer than its legs, and its prehensile tail can support the entire weight of the monkey and is used as an extra limb. Its hands have only a vestigial thumb, but long, strong, hook-like fingers. These adaptations allow the monkey to move by swinging by its arms beneath the tree branches.

Geoffroy's spider monkey lives in fission–fusion societies that contain between 20 and 42 members. Its diet consists primarily of ripe fruit and it requires large tracts of forest to survive. As a result of habitat loss, hunting and capture for the pet trade, it is considered to be endangered by the IUCN.

== Taxonomy ==
Geoffroy's spider monkey belongs to the New World monkey family Atelidae, which contains the spider monkeys, woolly monkeys, muriquis and howler monkeys. It is a member of the subfamily Atelinae, which includes the spider monkeys, woolly monkeys and muriquis, and of the genus Ateles, which contains all the spider monkeys. The genus name Ateles means "imperfect", a reference to the vestigial thumb. The species name geoffroyi is in honor of French naturalist Étienne Geoffroy Saint-Hilaire.

Agreement over the number of spider monkey species is not universal. Kellogg and Goldman (1944) based their classification on fur color, and Groves (1989) based his on fur color and geographic distribution. Kellogg and Goldman differentiated Geoffroy's spider monkey from other species by its dark black head, hands and wrists. Recent studies use mitochondrial DNA to help differentiate species. Such studies by Collins and Daubach (2000, 2001, 2006) indicate the Geoffroy's spider monkey is more closely related to the white-fronted spider monkey, A. belzebuth, and the brown spider monkey, A. hybridus, than it is to the red-faced spider monkey, A. paniscus. According to these studies, A. paniscus branched off from the other spider monkeys approximately 3.27 million years ago and the spider monkeys branched off from the woolly monkeys and muiriquis 3.59 million years ago. Older studies by Porter, et al. indicate the howler monkeys are believed to have branched off from the other Atelides over 10 million years ago.

In 2005, mammalian taxonomy reference work, Mammal Species of the World, listed five subspecies:

- Nicaraguan spider monkey, Ateles geoffroyi geoffroyi
- Hooded spider monkey, A. g. grisescens
- Ornate spider monkey, A. g. ornatus
- Mexican spider monkey, A. g. vellerosus
- Yucatan spider monkey, A. g. yucatanensis

In 2015, a phylogenetic study recommended A. g. yucatanensis was a junior synonym of A. g. vellerosus. Some authorities also recognize A. g. azuerensis and A. g. frontatus as valid subspecies.

The black-headed spider monkey, Ateles fusciceps, is considered by authorities such as Groves (1989) and Rylands et al. (2006) to be a separate species from Geoffroy's spider monkey. Other authorities, including Froelich (1991), Collins and Dubach (2001) and Nieves (2005), consider A. fusciceps to be synonymous with A. geoffroyi. Under this treatment, the two subspecies of the black-headed spider monkey represent additional subspecies of Geoffroy's spider monkey, A. g. fusciceps and A. g. rufiventris.

== Distribution and habitat ==
The range of this species extends over much of Central America, encompassing Panama, Costa Rica, Nicaragua, Guatemala, Honduras, El Salvador, Belize and the south and much of the eastern portion of Mexico. Observations by local people indicate the southernmost subspecies, the hooded spider monkey, A. g. grisescens, may also occur in the portion of Colombia near the Panama border. In western Colombia and northeast Panama, it is replaced by the black-headed spider monkey, A. fusciceps, which is considered by some primatologists to be a subspecies of Geoffroy's spider monkey.

Geoffroy's spider monkey lives in various types of forest, including rainforest, semideciduous and mangrove forests. Higher densities of Geoffroy's spider monkeys are generally found in areas containing evergreen forest.

== Physical description ==
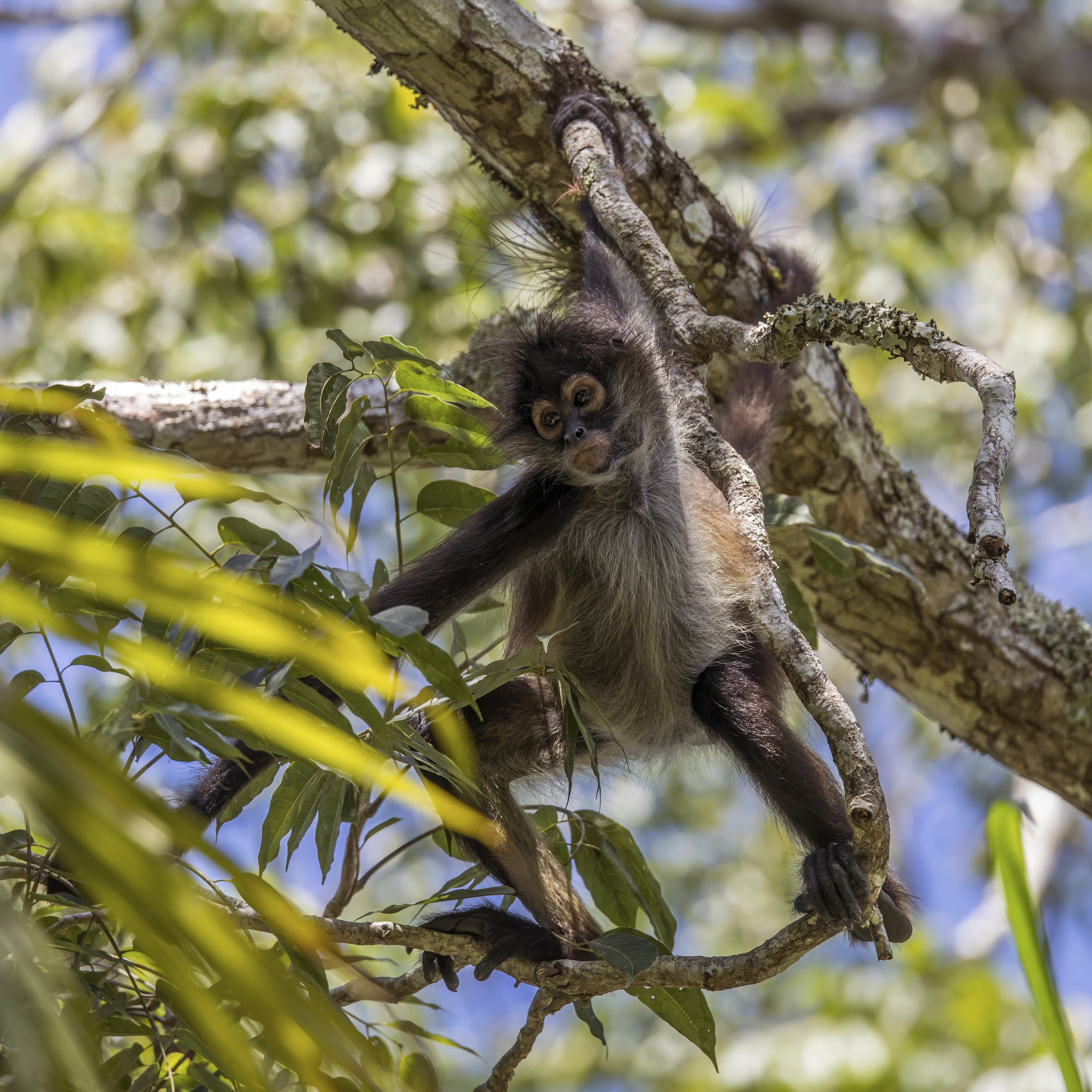
Juvenile A. g. yucatanensis

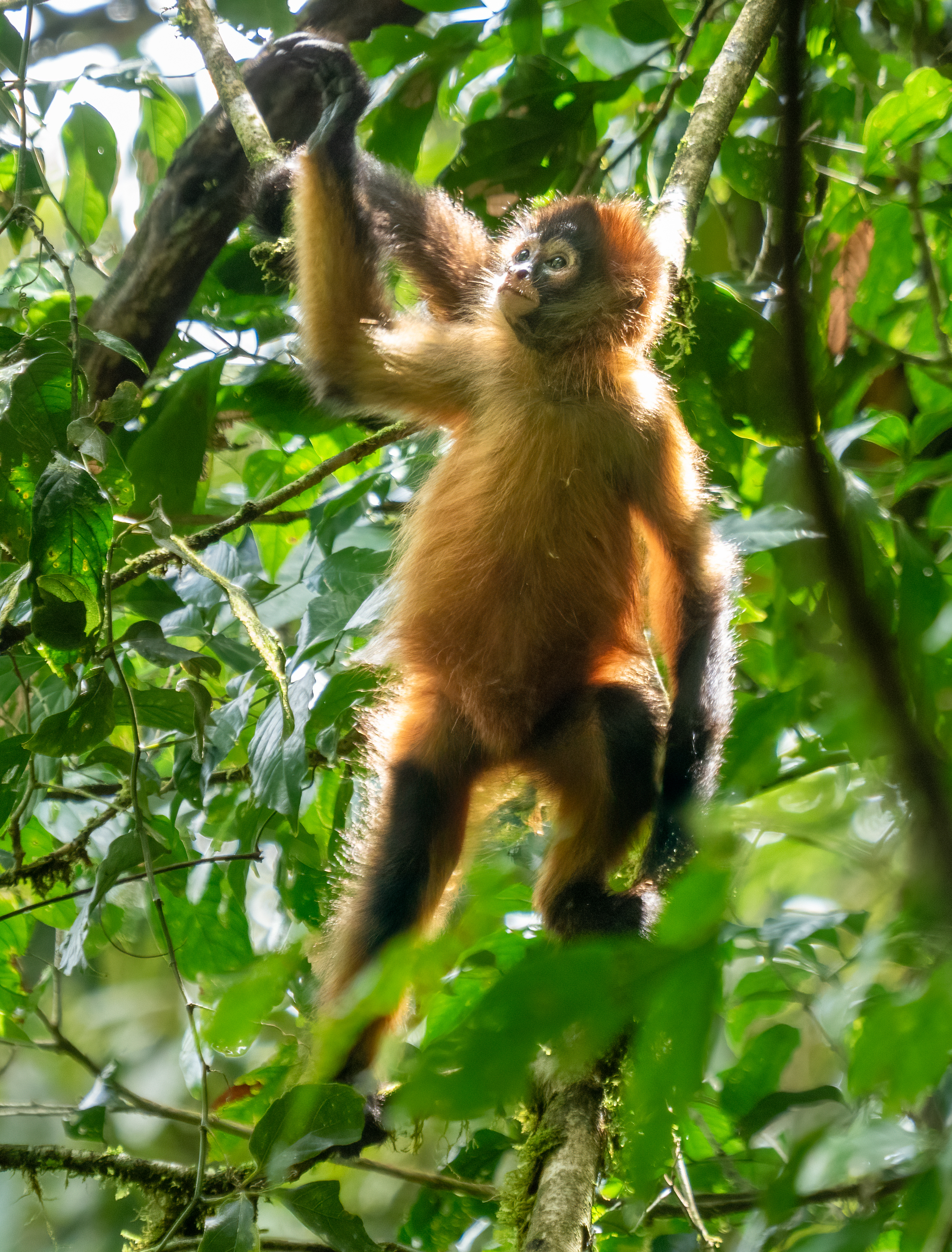
Juvenile A. g. ornatus in Costa Rica

Geoffroy's spider monkey is one of the largest New World monkeys. Its length measures between 30 and 63 cm (12 and 25 in) and it weighs between 6 and 9 kg (13 and 20 lb). The tail is longer than the body at between 63 and 85 cm (25 and 33 1/2 in). Males and females are approximately the same size.

Its body color varies by subspecies and population, and can be buff, reddish, rust, brown or black. The hands and feet are dark or black. The face usually has a pale mask and bare skin around the eyes and muzzle.

Its arms and legs are long and slim. The arms are about 25% longer than the legs. The thumb is only vestigial, but the fingers are long and strong, making the hands hook-like. The long arms and hook-like hands allow Geoffroy's spider monkey to brachiate, that is, swing by its arms beneath the tree branches.

The prehensile tail is very strong and has a palm-like pad at the end. The tail acts as an extra limb, and is used for locomotion, as well as to pick fruits and to scoop water from holes in trees. Geoffroy's spider monkey can support its weight suspended by its tail and often does so when feeding.

The clitoris of female Geoffroy's spider monkeys is large and protrudes, looking like a penis. This organ, called a pendulous clitoris because of the way it dangles externally, is actually larger than the male flaccid penis. As a result, females are sometimes mistaken for males by human observers. The enlarged clitoris is believed to aid males in determining sexual receptiveness, allowing them to touch the clitoris and smell their fingers to pick up chemical or olfactory cues to the female's reproductive status.

== Behavior ==
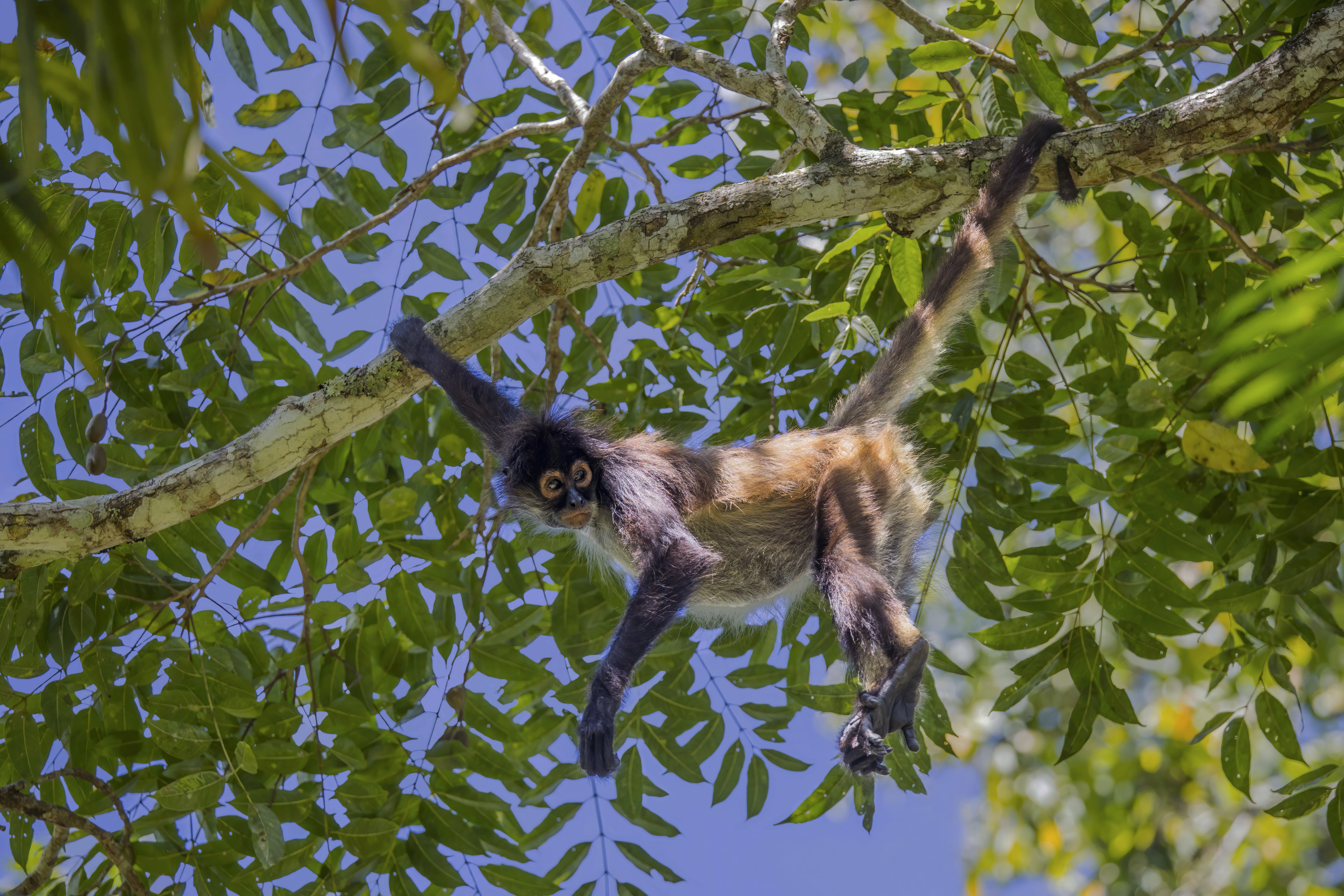
A. g. yucatanensis using its prehensile tail

Geoffroy's spider monkey is arboreal and diurnal, and mostly inhabits the upper portion of the forest. However, it comes to the ground more frequently than other spider monkey species. It lives in fission–fusion societies, large groups with a typical 20 to 42 members, which split into smaller subgroups to forage during the day. Subgroups typically number two to six members, and sometimes the subgroups remain separate from the main group even through the night.

Geoffroy's spider monkey forages over large tracts of forest in search of food. Home ranges for groups can exceed 900 hectares (2,200 acres). Monkeys can range about 2,000 metres (6,600 ft) each day. Males tend to cover a larger day range than females, and dominant individuals tend to have larger day ranges. Geoffroy's spider monkey sometimes rubs a mixture of saliva and ground lime tree Citrus aurantifolia leaves on its fur. This is believed to act as an insect repellent. In some locations, Geoffroy's spider monkey interacts with the white-headed capuchin. These interactions can include mutual grooming.

In addition to walking or running on four limbs and climbing, Geoffroy's spider monkey uses several forms of suspensory locomotion. Brachiation, or swinging from the arms with assistance from the prehensile tail, is the most common form of suspensory locomotion. Less common forms include swinging while suspended by the tail, and walking on four limbs under a branch. Studies have indicated the Geoffroy's spider monkey uses suspensory locomotion less frequently than other spider monkey species.

Captive Geoffroy's spider monkeys in Ueno Zoo, Japan (video)

The most common method used by spider monkeys to cross between trees is "bridging", in which the monkey grasps for a branch from the new tree and pulls it towards itself so it can climb onto it. Airborne leaps are used when necessary, and certain populations of Geoffroy's spider monkey, especially in Panama, are known to leap between trees more frequently than other populations.

When not moving, Geoffroy's spider monkey uses not only supported postures, such as sitting or standing, but also suspended postures in which it hangs from a branch. Suspended postures always include support from the tail, and sometimes the monkey hangs by its tail alone. Other times it hangs by the tail and by one or more limbs simultaneously. Studies have indicated at least some Geoffroy's spider monkey populations use suspended postures less frequently when feeding than other spider monkey species.

=== Communication and intelligence ===
Sounds produced by Geoffroy's spider monkey include barks, whinnies, squeals, squeaks and screams. Barks are typically alarm calls. Whinnies and screams can be used as distress calls, and are also made at dawn and at dusk. Each monkey makes a unique sound, which may allow monkeys to recognize each other through vocal communication alone. Several researchers have investigated the use of whinnies, which consist of between two and twelve quick increases and decreases in pitch, in more detail. This research has indicated one additional purpose of whinnies is to call other group members to a food source. Other purposes of whinnies suggested by this research have included maintaining vocal contact with other group members while traveling and distinguishing between group members and members of other groups.

Geoffroy's spider monkey uses several forms of nonvocal communication. A curled tail or arched back can be used as a threat display towards other spider monkeys. A head shake is used either as a threat or an invitation to play. Shaking branches or swaying arms is used as a warning of danger to the group.

Although they do not use tools, spider monkeys, including Geoffroy's spider monkey, are regarded as intelligent primates. A study performed in 2007 concluded they were the third most intelligent nonhuman primate, behind only orangutans and chimpanzees, and ahead of gorillas and all other monkeys. This mental capacity may be an adaptation to spider monkeys' frugivorous diets, which require them to be able to identify and memorize many different types of foods and their locations.

=== Diet ===
Geoffroy's spider monkey eats mostly fruit – preferably ripe and fleshy – and spends 70–80% of its feeding time eating fruit. Leaves make up most of the rest of its diet. Young leaves are especially important to provide the protein that can be lacking in fruit. Other elements of its diet include flowers, bark, insects, honey, seeds and buds.

In addition to providing much of the monkey's nutritional needs, fruit and leaves provide much of its water requirements. Like other spider monkeys, Geoffroy's spider monkey drinks water from tree holes and bromeliads in trees, but unlike other spider monkeys, it also drinks from terrestrial water sources.

=== Predators ===
Large cats – jaguars and pumas – appear to be the only significant adult spider monkey predators, other than humans. Eagles and large snakes are also potential predators. However, predation of Geoffroy's spider monkey has not been observed by researchers.

=== Reproduction ===
Females bear young every two to four years. Among males, mating is not restricted to only dominant individuals. In one study at Barro Colorado Island, all males in the group were observed mating at least once over a one-year period. However, dominant males appear to mate more often than low-ranking males. It is unknown whether male dominance is correlated with greater success in fathering offspring.

Geoffroy's spider monkeys mate in a sitting position, both facing the same direction, with the male seated behind the female and his arms wrapped around her chest and legs wrapped around her waist. This embrace can last between 8 and 22 minutes. Prior to mating, the male and female both separate themselves from the rest of the group, so they are alone except for any of the female's juvenile offspring.

The gestational period is about 7.5 months, after which a single young is typically born, although twins sometimes occur. The young are dark in color until they begin taking on the adult coloration at the age of five months. They are carried on their mothers' chests for the first month and a half to two months, at which point they can ride on their backs. They nurse until they are about one year old, but begin eating solid foods and moving independently at about three months. Even when they move independently, they cannot always cross gaps in the canopy that adults can manage. To help them, an adult will stretch across the gap, forming a bridge over which the young can cross.

Females become sexually mature at about four years, and males at about five years. Upon reaching sexual maturity, females leave their natal group, but males do not. As a result, the males in the groups are typically related, while the females are not. This may help explain why male Geoffroy's spider monkeys form strong bonds. Maximum life span in the wild is unknown. In captivity, Geoffroy's spider monkey can live at least 33 years.

== Conservation status ==
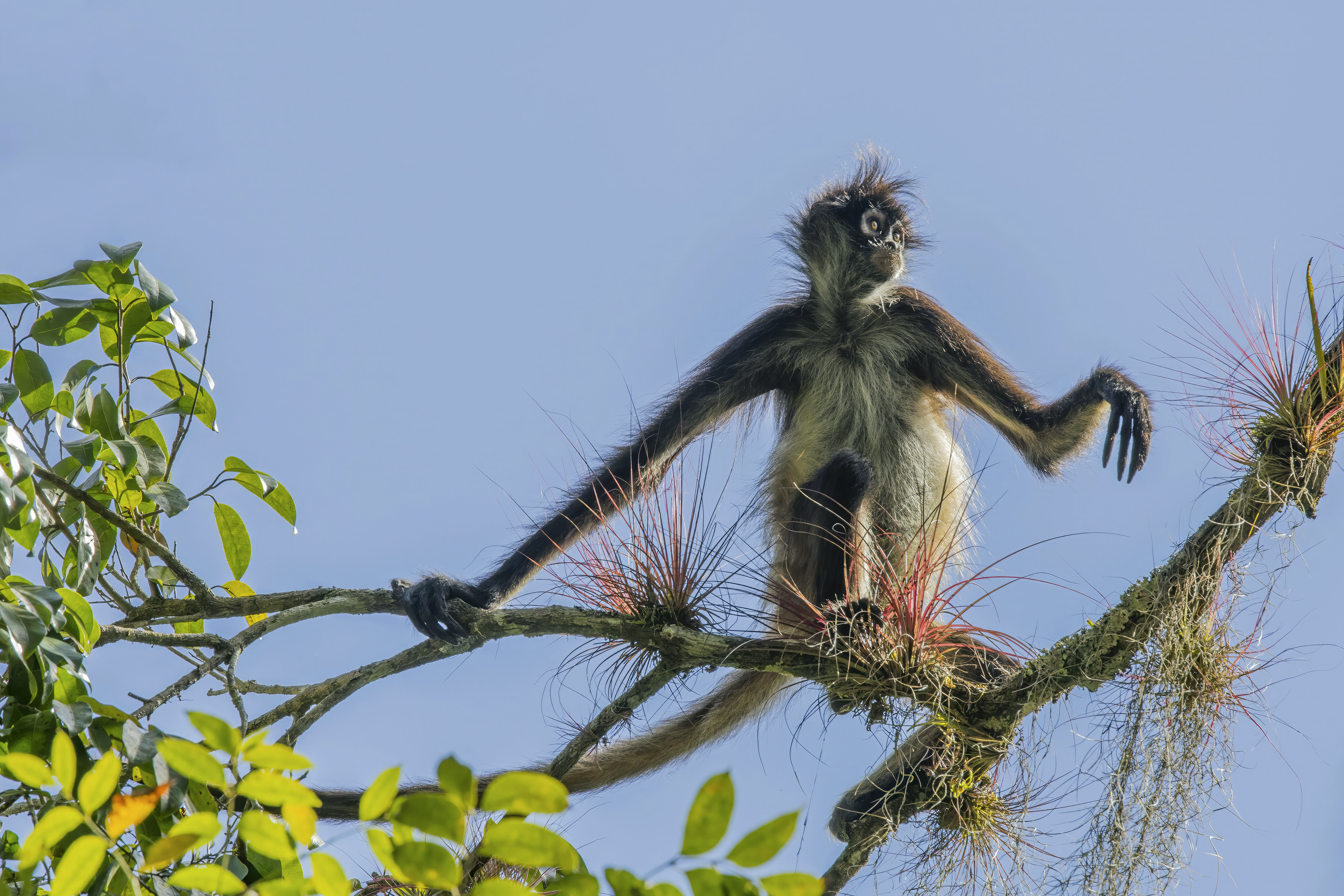
A. g. yucatanensis perching at the top of a tree

Geoffroy's spider monkey is listed as endangered by the IUCN, mostly due to habitat loss and capture for the pet trade. It requires large tracts of primary forest to survive, so it is vulnerable to deforestation and is sometimes hunted by humans and captured for the pet trade. Because of its low reproductive turnover, it cannot quickly replenish its numbers when affected by these events. As a result, Geoffroy's spider monkey has disappeared from some areas where it was once common. One subspecies is endangered, and two others are critically endangered.

Geoffroy's spider monkey was extirpated on Barro Colorado Island in Panama. Hunting had eliminated the native population there by 1912. However, between 1959 and 1966, an effort was made to reintroduce the species to Barro Colorado. At least 18 monkeys were reintroduced, but only five, one male and four females, survived the reintroduction. This small group has thrived, and the island population had grown to 28 monkeys by 2003.

== In culture ==
- The Mexican painter Frida Kahlo's Self-Portrait with Monkey 1938 portrays this species; the artist kept several of them as pets.
