= Hooded spider monkey =

Conservation status
- Data Deficient (IUCN 3.1)

Scientific classification
- Kingdom: Animalia
- Phylum: Chordata
- Class: Mammalia
- Order: Primates
- Family: Atelidae
- Genus: Ateles
- Species: A. geoffroyi
- Subspecies: A. g. grisescens

Trinomial name
- Ateles geoffroyi grisescens (Gray, 1866)

Synonyms
- cucullatus Gray, 1866

Subspecies of mammal

The hooded spider monkey (Ateles geoffroyi grisescens) is a subspecies of Geoffroy's spider monkey, a type of New World monkey, from Central America, native to Panama. It also might be found in a small portion of Colombia adjacent to Panama. In western Colombia and northeast Panama it is replaced by the Black-headed spider monkey, A. fusciceps. In western Panama, it is replaced by another subspecies of Geoffroy's Spider Monkey, the Ornate spider monkey, A. g. ornatus. The Hooded spider monkey has long, tawny fur.
