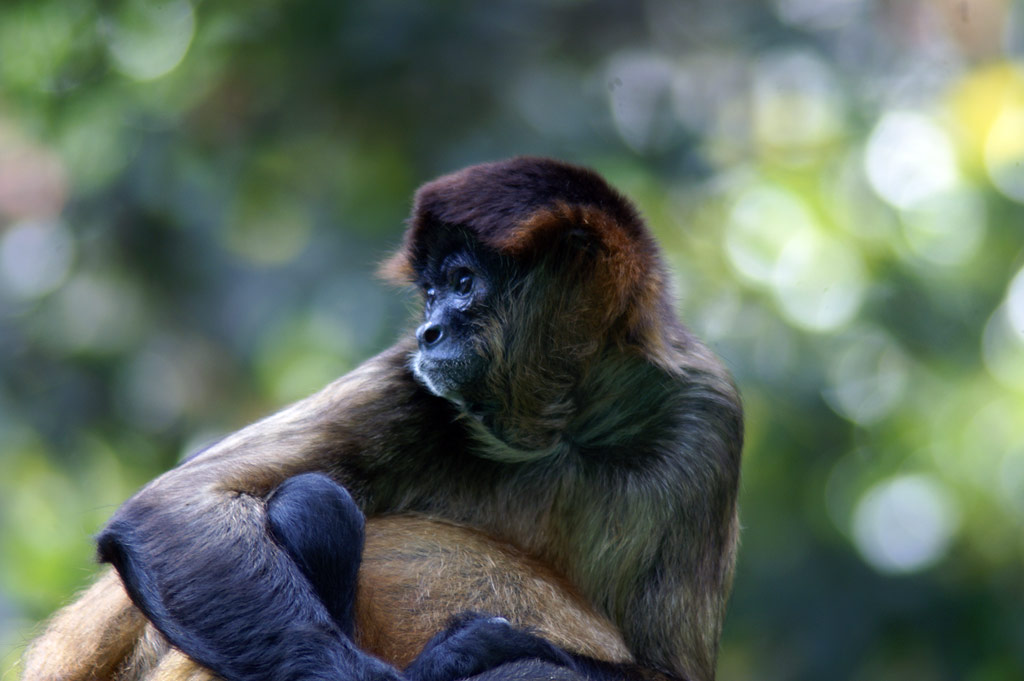

Conservation status
- Critically Endangered (IUCN 3.1)

Scientific classification
- Kingdom: Animalia
- Phylum: Chordata
- Class: Mammalia
- Order: Primates
- Family: Atelidae
- Genus: Ateles
- Species: A. geoffroyi
- Subspecies: A. g. azuerensis

Trinomial name
- Ateles geoffroyi azuerensis Bole, 1937

= Azuero spider monkey =

Subspecies of New World monkey

The Azuero spider monkey (Ateles geoffroyi azuerensis) is a possible subspecies of spider monkey that is in critical danger of extinction according to the IUCN Red List of Threatened Species. Common names of this subspecies include mono charro, mono charao and mono araña. The Azuero subspecies is one of three types of spider monkeys in Panama; Ateles geoffroyi panamensis with a range spanning from Costa Rica to Darién excluding the Azuero, Ateles geoffroyi fusciceps, with a range spanning Panamá and Colón provinces, and Ateles geoffroyi azuerensis, the Azuero spider monkey, whose range encompasses only the Azuero Peninsula.

== Foraging habits ==
Although no published research pertaining specifically to the eating habits of the Azuero spider monkey exists, spider monkeys in general are frugivores. They dedicate anywhere from 55 to 90% of feeding time to fruit, but also eat plant parts such as leaves, flowers, seeds, and aerial roots. Although they feed on a diverse variety of taxa, they are specialists in that they feed on ripe fruit, which is easy to penetrate, thus necessitating a wide species foraging range due to their reliance on seasonally fruiting resources. Their ability to swallow fruits with large seeds rich in lipids enables dispersal of plant species that are rarely dispersed by other species. In addition to the primary influence of fruit availability, the location of water resources, sleeping sites, climatic extremes, and patrolling of range boundaries are all factors that influence spider monkey species ranges. Published research on other spider monkey subspecies suggests that their home range requires anywhere from 95-390 ha in forests. These numbers remain unconfirmed for the Azuero spider monkey subspecies.

== Taxonomic Classification ==
The Genus Ateles itself contains 14 species and 10 subspecies, across four genera

- Kingdom Animalia
  - Phylum Chordata
    - Class Mammalia
    - Order Primates
      - Family Atelinae
        - Subfamily Atelinae
          - Genus Ateles

The Azuero spider monkey was first described as Ateles Geoffroyi azueroensis by zoologist Patterson Bole Jr. in 1937, in which it was classified under the genus Ateles and the species Ateles geoffroyi, which is commonly known as Geoffroy's spider monkey. Its original description was based on physical specimens that were collected on the Azuero Peninsula in Panama, in which it was locally identified as Altos Negritos in the Veraguas province

== Conservation Efforts ==
Conservation efforts for the Azuero spider monkey prioritize the restoration of tropical forest where they live, as well as protecting them. A notable movement is the reintroduction of native fruit trees, which not only helps improve the local rainforests, but helps azuero spider monkeys by providing them with food to eat.

The Cerro Hoya National Park and the La Tronosa Forest Reserve also contain important remaining habitats for the azuero spider monkey. Pro Eco Azuero is another charity organization that helps with endangered species in the area, which includes the azuero spider monkey, which helps reconnect their communities together, restore forest ecosystems which in turn helps the spider monkeys repopulate, and reconnect fragmented habitats. Due to these efforts, they can help improve habitat connectivity of the Azuero spider monkey and other wildlife as well.

== Distribution/ Habitat Fragmentation ==
The Azuero spider monkey can mainly be found in the southern areas of the Azuero Peninsula, due to them disappearing mostly from the northern peninsula. This includes areas such as the Cerro Hoya National Park, La Tronosa Forest Reserve, and some parts of the Mariato District

== Behaviour ==
The Azuero spider monkey, much like other spider monkeys, are animals that are highly intelligent and playful. Like many other species of spider monkeys, they live in large groups together. Azuero spider monkeys also display a dynamic called the fission-fusion dynamic; a social system where a group of animals dissolve into smaller groups and overtime, begin to regroup with each other.

The Azuero spider monkey is also an incredibly agile and dexterous. They use the forest trees to climb, travel, and feed. They are adept at traversing the jungle due to their prehensile tail, which acts almost like another limb for the monkey.

Azuero spider monkeys also communicate via body movements and vocalizations.

== Threats to survival ==
Due to the highly reduced and fragmented nature of the tropical dry forest habitat that originally covered nearly the entire Azuero peninsula, forest remnants large enough to support Azuero spider monkey populations are rare. This deforestation, which includes tourism-related development and modern infrastructure,and the hunting of individuals, by the Ngabe Buglé groups, make up the two most influential factors threatening the survival of Azuero spider monkey populations.

It has been stated that the Azuero spider monkey has a recorded 65 individuals across 9 different groups in a study conducted between September 2017 and February 2020 This makes them one of the most critically endangered spider monkeys in the world, right after the brown spider monkey and the brown-headed spider monkey.

== Research ==
The Mohamed bin Zayed Species Conservation Fund has provided funding for research on the Azuero spider monkey. This research is looking into aspects of what the Azuero spider monkey eats, what constitutes a corridor, and how spider monkeys are key indicators of forest health.
