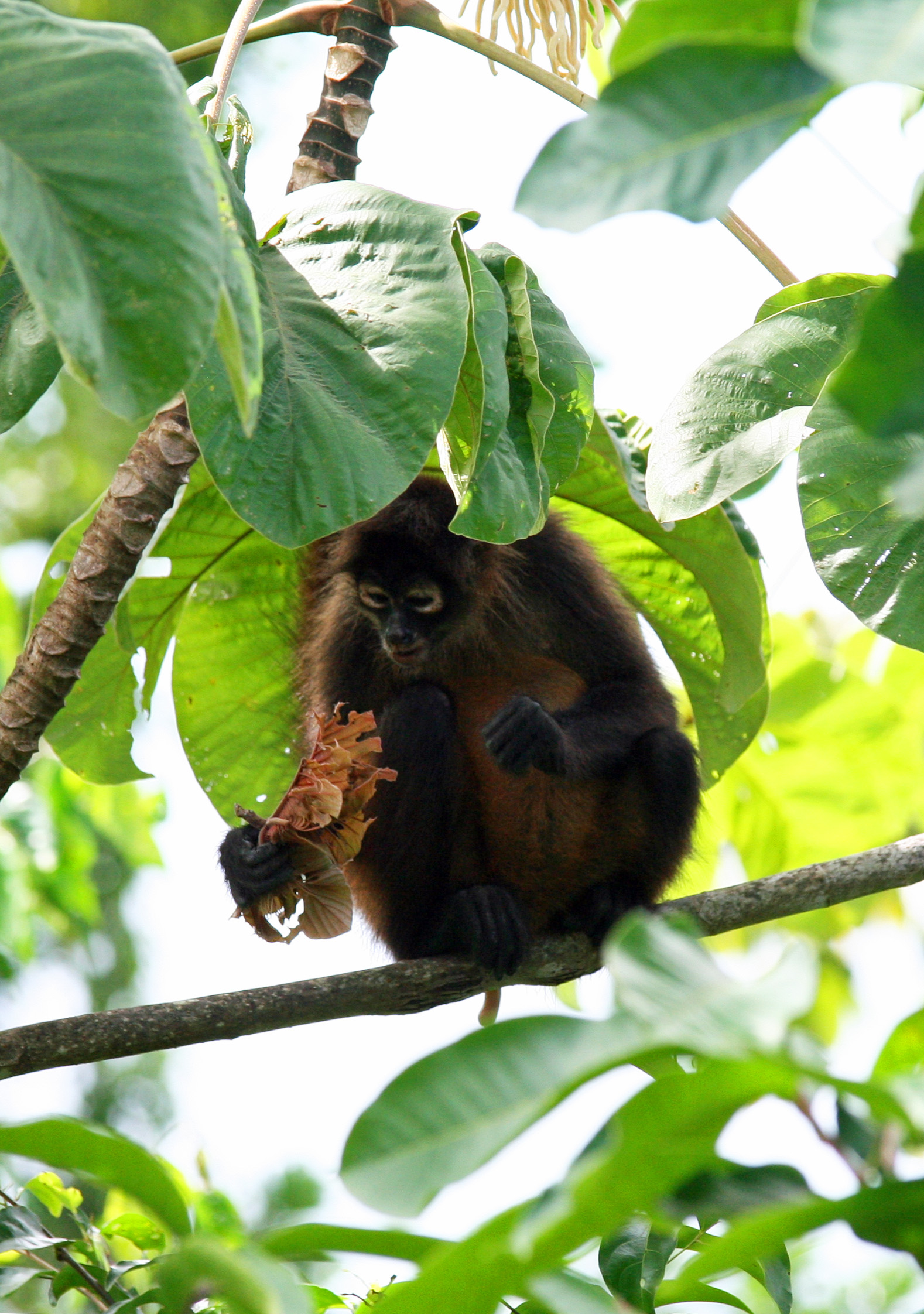

Conservation status
- Critically Endangered (IUCN 3.1)
- CITES Appendix I (CITES)

Scientific classification
- Kingdom: Animalia
- Phylum: Chordata
- Class: Mammalia
- Order: Primates
- Suborder: Haplorhini
- Infraorder: Simiiformes
- Family: Atelidae
- Genus: Ateles
- Species: A. geoffroyi
- Subspecies: A. g. geoffroyi

Trinomial name
- Ateles geoffroyi geoffroyi (Kuhl, 1820)

Synonyms
- frontatus Gray, 1842; melanochir Desmarest, 1820; trianguligera Weinland, 1862

= Nicaraguan spider monkey =

Subspecies of New World monkey

The Nicaraguan spider monkey (Ateles geoffroyi geoffroyi) is a subspecies of Geoffroy's spider monkey, a type of New World monkey, from Central America. It is native to Nicaragua and parts of Costa Rica. It is classified as critically endangered in the IUCN Red List.

== Taxonomy ==
The Nicaraguan spider monkey is a subspecies of Geoffroy's spider monkey. It was first described by German zoologist Heinrich Kuhl in 1820. The population in Guanacaste peninsula in Costa Rica and much of Nicaragua is considered to be a separate subspecies frontatus by some of the zoologists including John Edward Gray.

== Distribution and habitat ==
The Nicaraguan spider monkey is native to Nicaragua and parts of Costa Rica. It is classified as critically endangered in the IUCN Red List due to continuous decline of habitats and the population.
