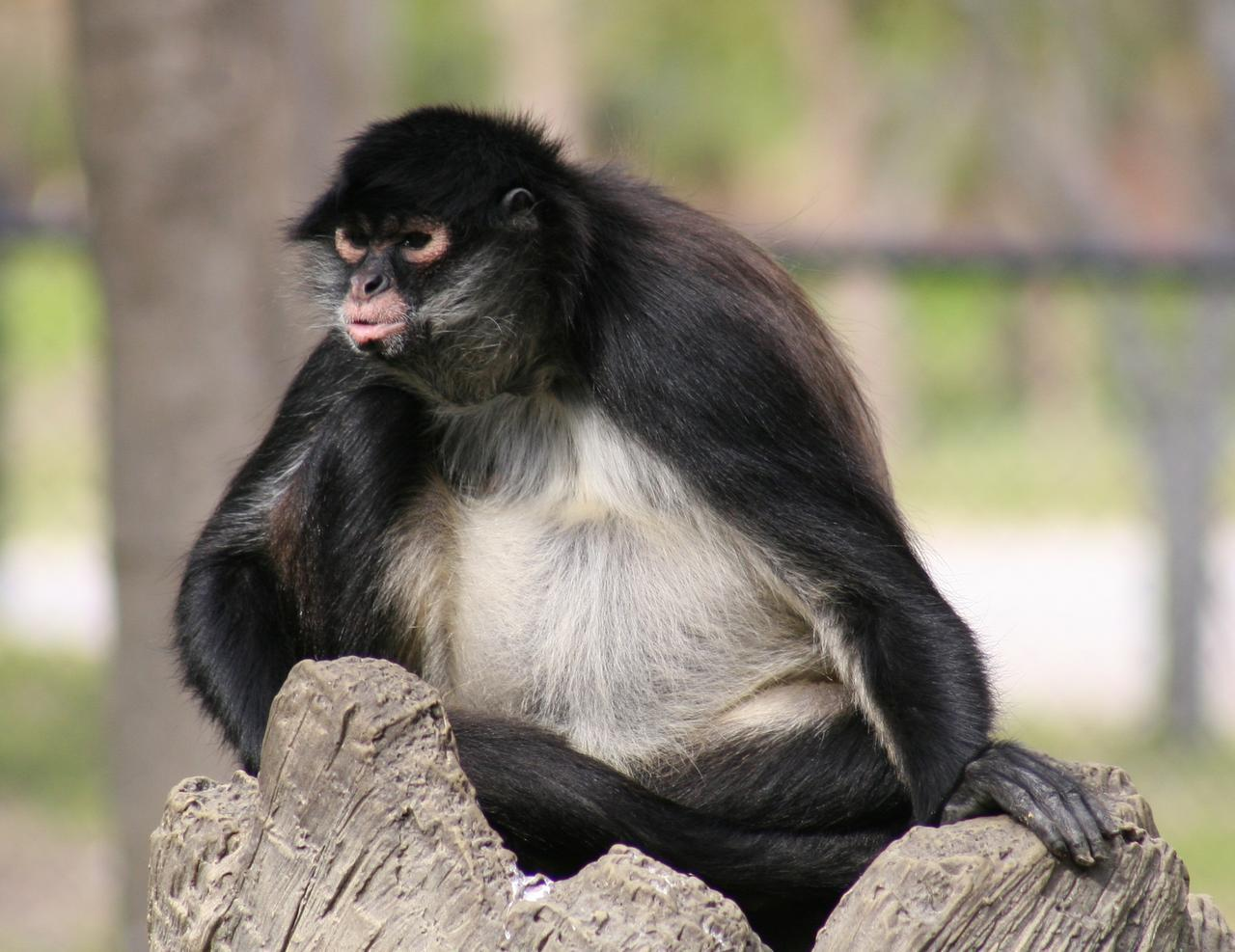
- At Miami MetroZoo, USA

Conservation status
- Endangered (IUCN 3.1)

Scientific classification
- Kingdom: Animalia
- Phylum: Chordata
- Class: Mammalia
- Order: Primates
- Family: Atelidae
- Genus: Ateles
- Species: A. geoffroyi
- Subspecies: A. g. vellerosus

Trinomial name
- Ateles geoffroyi vellerosus (Gray, 1866)

= Mexican spider monkey =

Subspecies of New World monkey

The Mexican spider monkey (Ateles geoffroyi vellerosus), also known by its mayan name "Ma'ax", is a subspecies of Geoffroy's spider monkey, and is one of the largest types of New World monkey. It inhabits forests of Mexico, Guatemala, Belize, El Salvador and Honduras. It is a social animal, living in groups of 20–42 members. The subspecies is considered to be an endangered according to the IUCN Red List since 2020, mostly due to human threats.

The Yucatan spider monkey was previously considered a separate subspecies but is now listed as a junior synonym of the Mexican spider monkey by the International Union for Conservation of Nature (IUCN) and the Integrated Taxonomic Information System (ITIS).

The subspecies is frugivorous, as it feeds mostly from fruits found in trees. They feed along a linear route which they plan in advance, and they rarely enter unknown areas. However, significant environmental incidents can have a direct impact on their behaviour and diet.

Yucatan spider monkeys live on average 25 years in the wild, which can vary depending on their environment, and they are estimated to live up to 35 years while in captivity.

== Description ==
The Mexican spider monkey weighs around 9 kg (20 lb), making it one of the largest of the New World monkeys. It has long arms and a prehensile tail, which can support its own weight. The body is long and slender and covered with black hair, which is coarse and often looks matted. Adult body length ranges between 305 and 630 mm (12.0 and 24.8 in), with a 635 to 840 mm (25.0 to 33.1 in) long tail. They live in large fruit trees and jump from branch to branch effortlessly moving up to 40 feet in one swing, causing them to be a great seed disperser for many tree species. The fur of the Yucatan population tends to be somewhat paler than that of the other populations. There are usually tan-coloured markings around the eyes and chin, and whiskers around the head area.

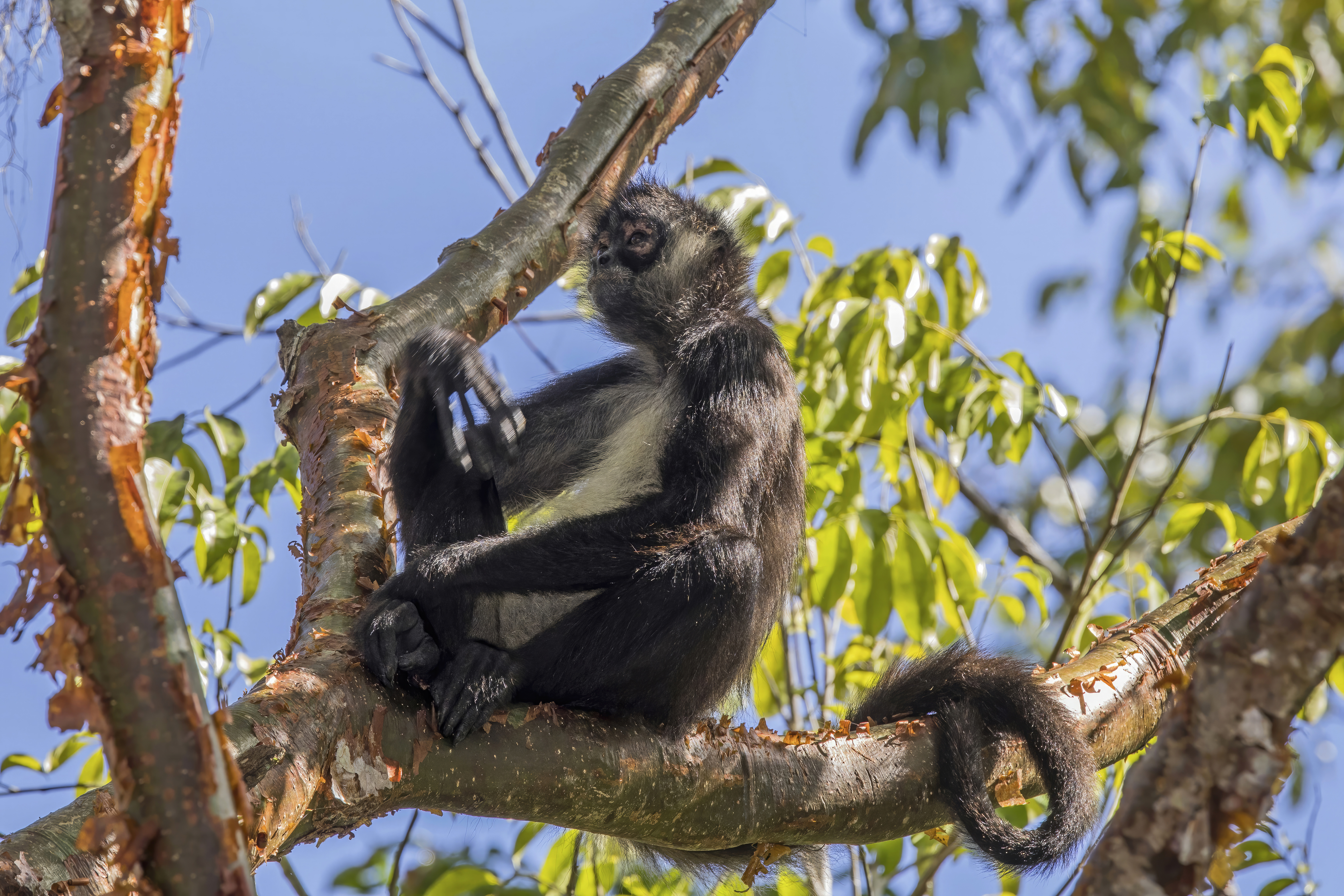

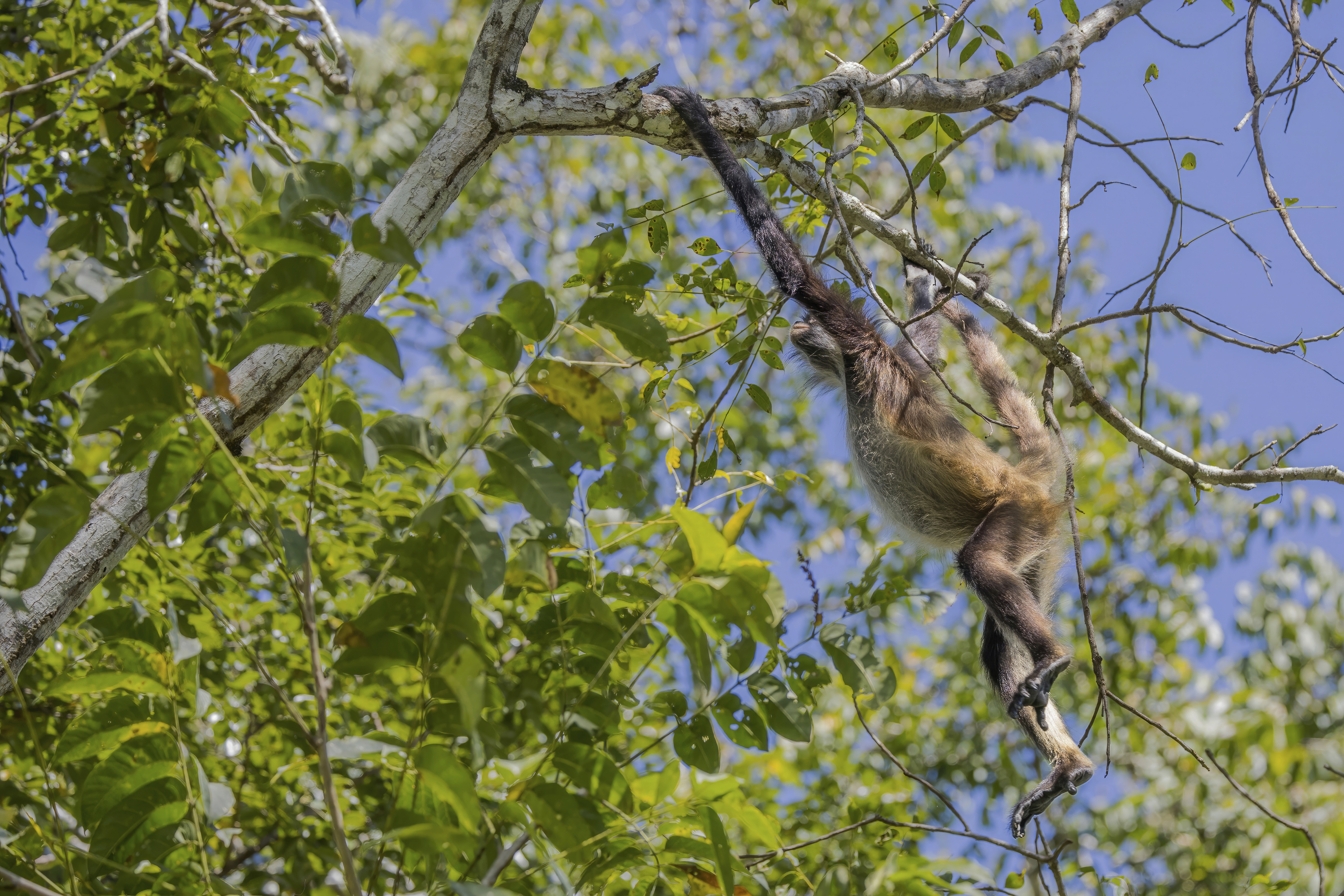

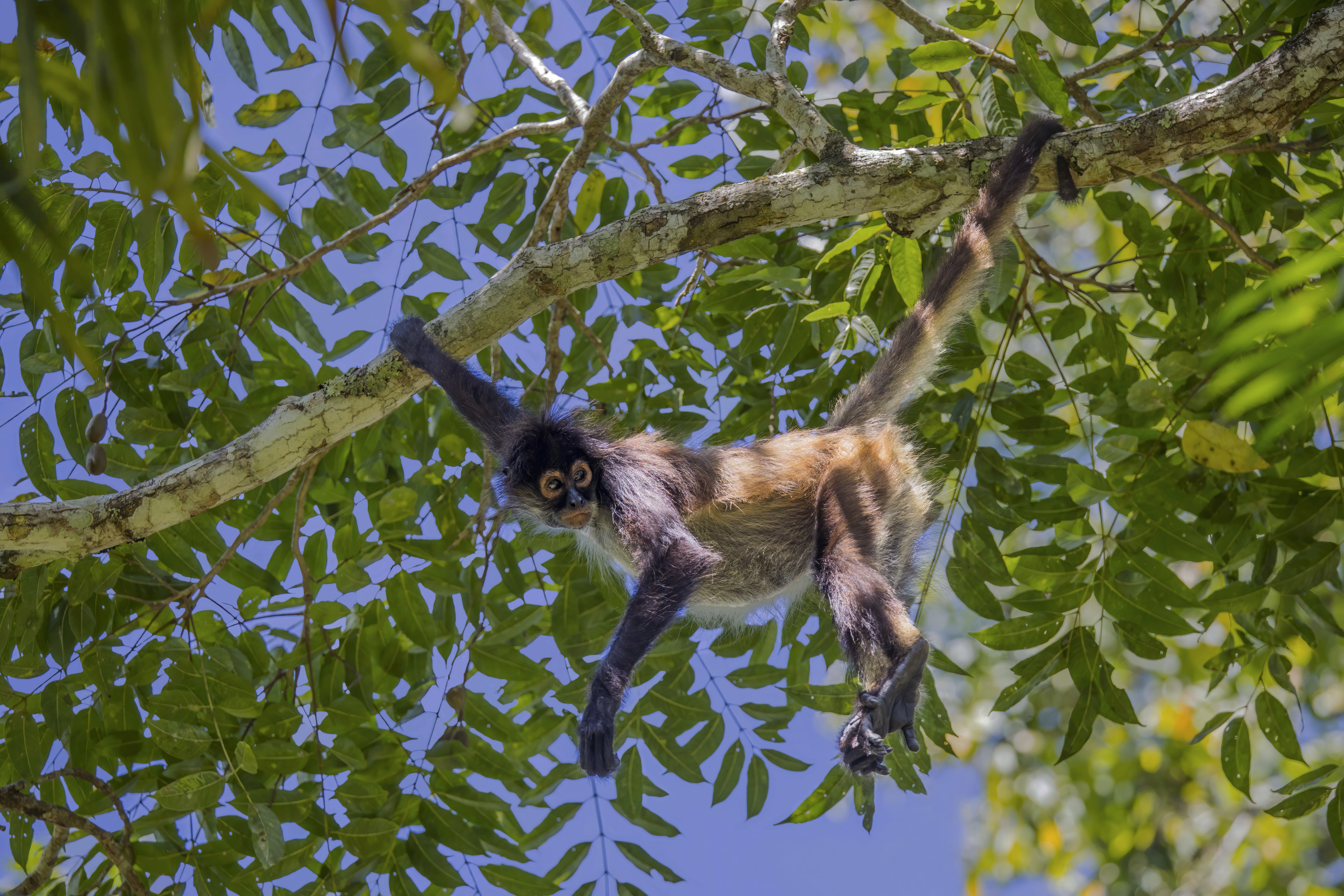

== Behaviour and ecology ==
The Mexican spider monkey is very social, living in groups of anywhere between 10 and 100 members (20–42 members on average). These groups are typically dominated by females, one of whom plans foraging routes for the rest of the group.

Male-male relationship have also been documented. In these there is a focus on physical behaviour such as grooming, embracing, arm-wrapping, and grappling. Though most of these actions are reciprocated between the two males, the most successful bonds tend to be between males of similar ages, with pronounced differences in male-male relationships with a larger age gap (between individuals of <10 years and ≥ 14 years). Actions performed between males of similar ages showed that the affection was beneficial for both of the monkeys, while in the relationships with larger age differences, a lot more affection was given by the younger male than was received, possibly showing the value of respect of elders in groups.

The Mexican spider monkey finds the tallest trees for better protection from predators and access to fruits. They feed primarily during the early morning and rest for the remainder of the day. When threatened, these monkeys will "bark" while throwing objects including feces or branches while jumping up and down.

=== Distribution and habitat ===
The Mexican spider monkey has the social characteristic of having a large flexibility in grouping patterns. As large groups ranging from 10 to 100 individuals of this species can be seen at one place at a certain moment, it is more common to find smaller groups of 3 to 5 individuals. They tend to isolate and join into subgroups during certain parts of the day to roam for an undetermined amount of time. This unusual social behaviour pattern is identified as fission-fusion. Moreover, the Mexican spider monkey can be found in different types of locations depending on the number of individuals within the group of subgroup. Large groups tend to remain in conserved forest which they know, while small subgroups have a higher chance to be found near human populations.

The Mexican spider monkey tends to live in areas that include certain characteristics, such as abundance of preferred fruits, sleeping sites and refuges. Furthermore, studies have shown that spider monkeys spend most of their time in the same area which range between 3.1 and 9.2 ha (7.7 and 22.7 acres). Older vegetation species and higher canopy levels are preferred by the subspecies due to the abundance of fruits and resources. Each year the Mexican spider monkey tends to explore unknown areas, in search of new sources of fruits; however, it is most likely to stay in areas that it knows, as studies have shown that memory-based processes reinforce the use of known areas.

=== Reproduction and lifespan ===
The Mexican spider monkey reaches an average age of 25 years in wild, while in captivity this is closer to 35 years. A female Mexican spider monkey ovulation is suppressed by lactation and birth occurs once every 2 to 3 years. Females have an estrous cycle of 24 to 27 days. Mating is a period of two to three days. They have a long gestation period of 226–232 days. Males are sexually mature in five years and females in four.

The infant monkey is completely black and will cling to its mother's back for the first two years of its life. It will also only start eating fruit at around two years old.The males have no role in offspring carrying.

=== Diet ===
The Mexican monkey is frugivorous, with a diet consisting of around 90% fruit and 10% eggs and insects. In captivity, the Mexican spider monkey's diet generally consists of fruits, dog food, bread and a few vegetables, such as carrots and lettuce. Wild Mexican spider monkeys tend to vary their fruit diet depending on the abundance of certain plant species in the area of habitat. However, the most nutritive fruits are preferred by the subspecies therefore, wild figs called "koochlé", the fruits of ramón, and other wild tamarind fruits are the favoured by the subspecies. Leaves are also an important component within their diet as that they consume monthly depending on the availability of nutritious fruits in their surroundings.

The Mexican spider monkey moves in straight lines towards its food and is able to orient its movement to foraging areas invisible from its current vantage point. Individuals consistently plan out foraging areas ahead of time. The ranging patterns of the subspecies are influenced by weather conditions along the year; however, the difference in seasons does not impact their ranging behaviour.

Foraging behaviour after a natural disaster (a hurricane) showed increased splitting up into smaller sub-groups. Less time was spent moving, and the main food source changed from fruit to leaves.

== Conservation ==
Since 2020 the Mexican spider monkey has entered the Red List of the IUCN as an endangered species, which means it is currently facing high risks of extinction within the next 45 years. According to data collected by the Global Forest Watch across Mexico, El Salvador, Belize, Guatemala, and Honduras, deforestation is the main reason behind the decrease of population of this species. If deforestation remains at this rate, Mexican spider monkey's habitat has been predicted to reduce by 40% within the next 40 years.

Human threats play a major role in the decrease of population of the species. The fragmentation of the Mexican spider monkeys among its different countries of habitat, has demonstrated to increase its vulnerability to hunting, as spider monkeys are among the most hunted monkeys for pet trade and for their good meat. Livestock farming, palm oil monocultures, and other mega-projects such as mining projects are at the origin of the important habitat loss in this region. Furthermore, the long birth interval of this subspecies, results in the higher risk of extinction, especially in areas that are threatened by human usage.
