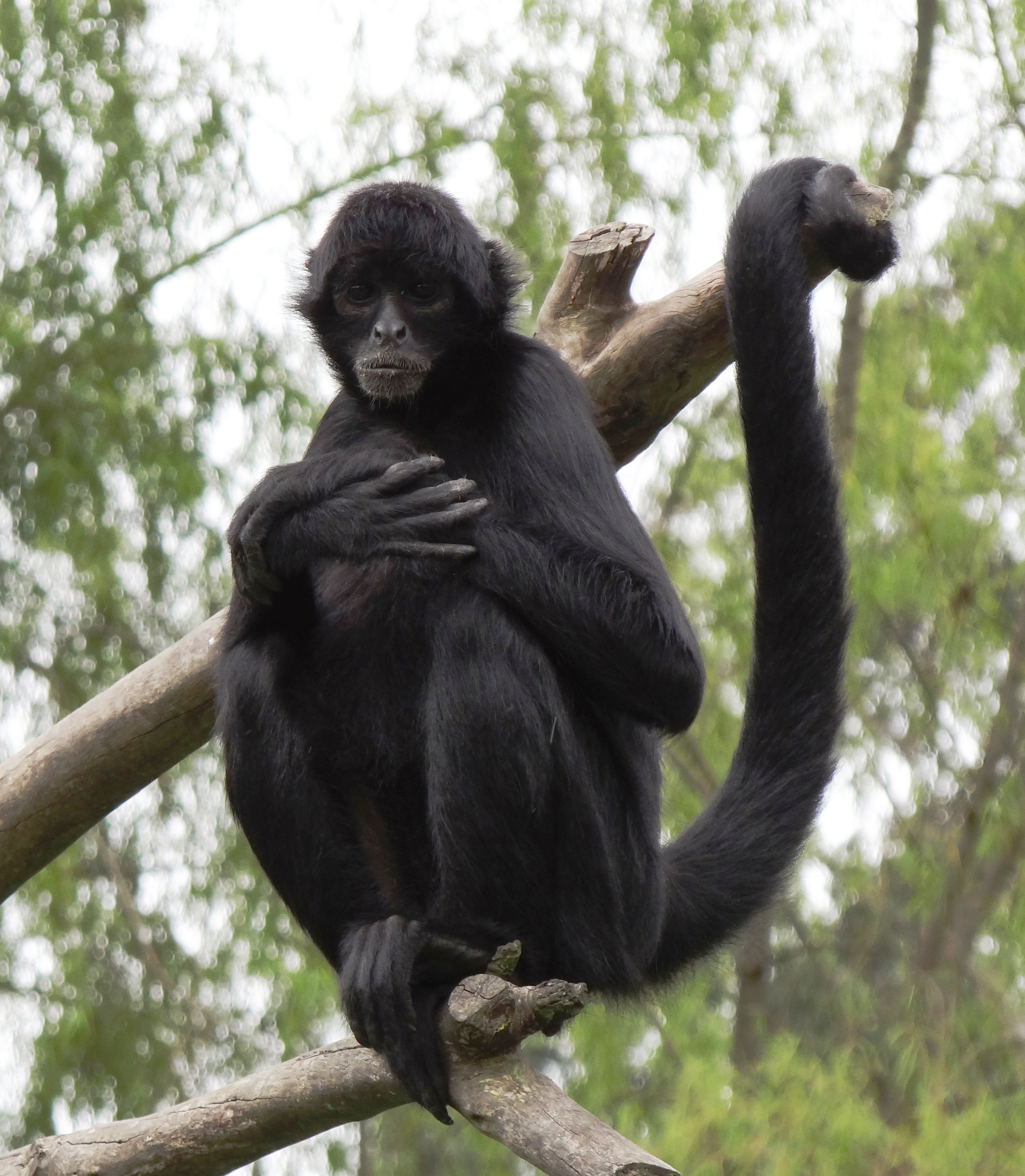
- Black-headed spider monkey (Ateles fusciceps)

Scientific classification
- Kingdom: Animalia
- Phylum: Chordata
- Class: Mammalia
- Infraclass: Placentalia
- Order: Primates
- Family: Atelidae
- Subfamily: Atelinae
- Genus: Ateles; É. Geoffroy, 1806

Type species
- Simia paniscus Linnaeus, 1758

Species
- See text
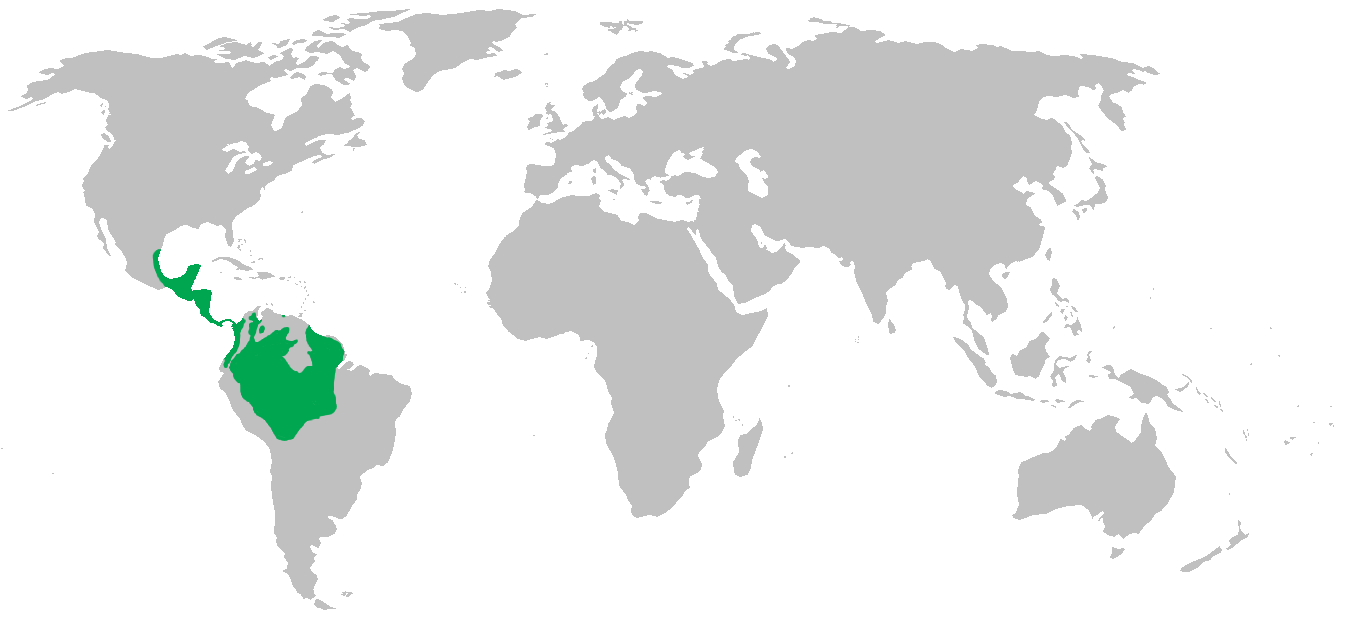
- Range of the spider monkeys

= Spider monkey =

Genus of mammals belonging to the New World monkeys

Spider monkeys are New World monkeys belonging to the genus Ateles, part of the subfamily Atelinae, family Atelidae. Like other atelines, they are found in tropical forests of Central and South America, from southern Mexico to Brazil. The genus consists of seven species, all of which are under threat; the brown spider monkey is critically endangered. They are also notable for their ability to be easily bred in captivity.

According to the Saint Louis Zoo, spider monkeys, which have arms longer than their legs, but lack thumbs, are so-called because they hang from branches by their prehensile tail, with their long limbs suspended in the air, for which they resemble spiders dangling from a web. They are one of the largest New World monkeys. Spider monkeys live in the upper layers of the rainforest and forage in the high canopy, from 25 to 30 m (82 to 98 ft). Due to their large size, spider monkeys require large tracts of moist evergreen forests, and prefer undisturbed primary rainforest. They primarily eat fruits, but will also occasionally consume leaves, flowers, and insects. They are social animals and live in bands of up to 35 individuals, but will split up to forage during the day.

Meta-analyses on primate cognition studies conducted in the 2000s indicated spider monkeys are the most intelligent New World monkeys. They can produce a wide range of sounds and will "bark" when threatened; other vocalisations include a whinny similar to a horse and prolonged screams.

They are an important food source due to their large size, so are widely hunted by local human populations; they are also threatened by habitat destruction due to logging and land clearing. Spider monkeys are susceptible to malaria and are used in laboratory studies of the disease. The population trend for spider monkeys is decreasing; the IUCN Red List lists one species as vulnerable, five species as endangered and one species as critically endangered.

== Evolutionary history ==
Theories abound about the evolution of the atelines; one theory is they are most closely related to the woolly spider monkeys (Brachyteles), and most likely split from woolly monkeys (Lagothrix) in the South American lowland forest, to evolve their unique locomotory system. This theory is not supported by fossil evidence. Other theories include Brachyteles, Lagothrix and Ateles in an unresolved trichotomy, and two clades, one composed of Ateles and Lagothrix and the other of Alouatta and Brachyteles. Research conducted in the 2000s found molecular evidence that suggests the Atelinae split in the middle to late Miocene (13 Ma), separating spider monkeys from the woolly spider monkeys and the woolly monkeys.

== Taxonomic classification ==
The genus name Ateles derives from the ancient greek word ἀτέλεια (atéleia), meaning "incomplete, imperfect", in reference to the reduced or non-existent thumbs of spider monkeys.

The genus contains 14 species, and 10 subspecies across four genera.

- Family Atelidae
  - Subfamily Alouattinae: howler monkeys
  - Subfamily Atelinae
    - Genus Ateles: spider monkeys
      - Red-faced spider monkey, Ateles paniscus
      - White-fronted spider monkey, Ateles belzebuth
      - Peruvian spider monkey, Ateles chamek
      - Brown spider monkey, Ateles hybridus
      - White-cheeked spider monkey, Ateles marginatus
      - Black-headed spider monkey, Ateles fusciceps
        - Brown-headed spider monkey, Ateles fusciceps fusciceps
        - Colombian spider monkey, Ateles fusciceps rufiventris
      - Geoffroy's spider monkey, Ateles geoffroyi
        - Hooded spider monkey Ateles geoffroyi grisescens
        - Yucatan spider monkey, Ateles geoffroyi yucatanensis
        - Mexican spider monkey, Ateles geoffroyi vellerosus
        - Nicaraguan spider monkey, Ateles geoffroyi geoffroyi
        - Ornate spider monkey, Ateles geoffroyi ornatus
    - Genus Brachyteles: muriquis (woolly spider monkeys)
    - Genus Lagothrix: woolly monkeys

== Anatomy and physiology ==
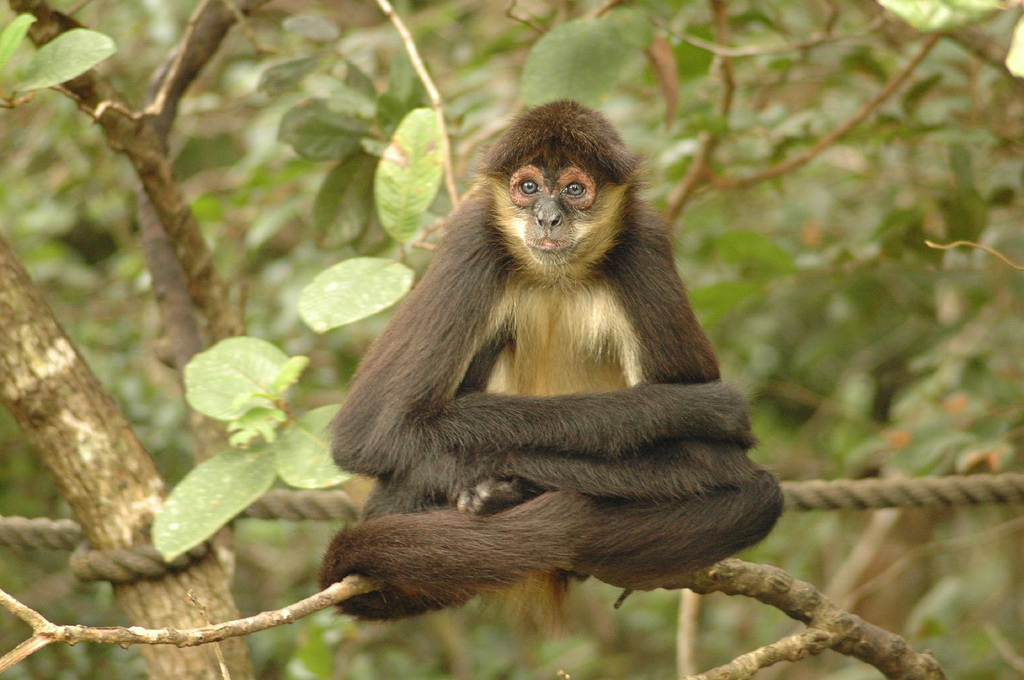
Geoffroy's spider monkey

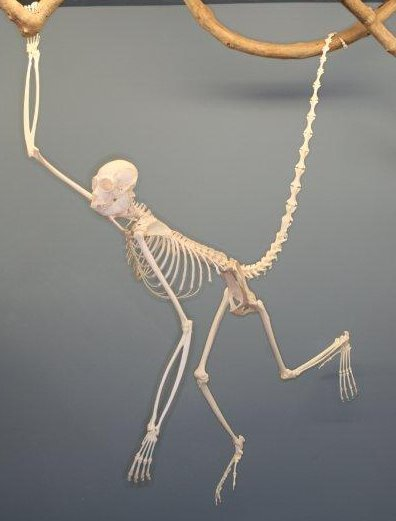
Spider monkey skeleton on display at The Museum of Osteology, Oklahoma City, Oklahoma

Spider monkeys are among the largest New World monkeys; black-headed spider monkeys, the largest spider monkey, have an average weight of 11 kilograms (24 lb) for males and 9.66 kg (21.3 lb) for females. Disproportionately long, spindly limbs inspired the spider monkey's common name. Their deftly prehensile tails, which may be up to 89 cm (35 in) long, have very flexible, hairless tips and skin grooves similar to fingerprints. This adaptation to their strictly arboreal lifestyle serves as a fifth hand. When the monkey walks, its arms practically drag on the ground. Unlike many monkeys, they do not use their arms for balance when walking, instead relying on their tails. The hands are long, narrow, and hook-like and have reduced or nonexistent thumbs. The fingers are elongated and recurved.

Their hair is coarse, ranging in color from ruddy gold to brown and black, or white in a rare number of specimens. The hands and feet are usually black. Heads are small with hairless faces. The nostrils are very far apart, which is a distinguishing feature of spider monkeys.

Spider monkeys are highly agile, and they are said to be second only to the gibbons in this respect. They have been seen in the wild jumping from tree to tree.

Female spider monkeys have a clitoris that is especially developed; it may be referred to as a pseudo-penis because it has an interior passage, or urethra, that makes it almost identical to the penis, and retains and distributes urine droplets as the female moves around. This urine is emptied at the bases of the clitoris, and collects in skin folds on either side of a groove on the perineal. Researchers and observers of spider monkeys of South America look for a scrotum to determine the animal sex because these female spider monkeys have pendulous and erectile clitorises long enough to be mistaken for a penis; researchers may also determine the animal's sex by identifying scent-marking glands that may be present on the clitoris.

== Behavior ==
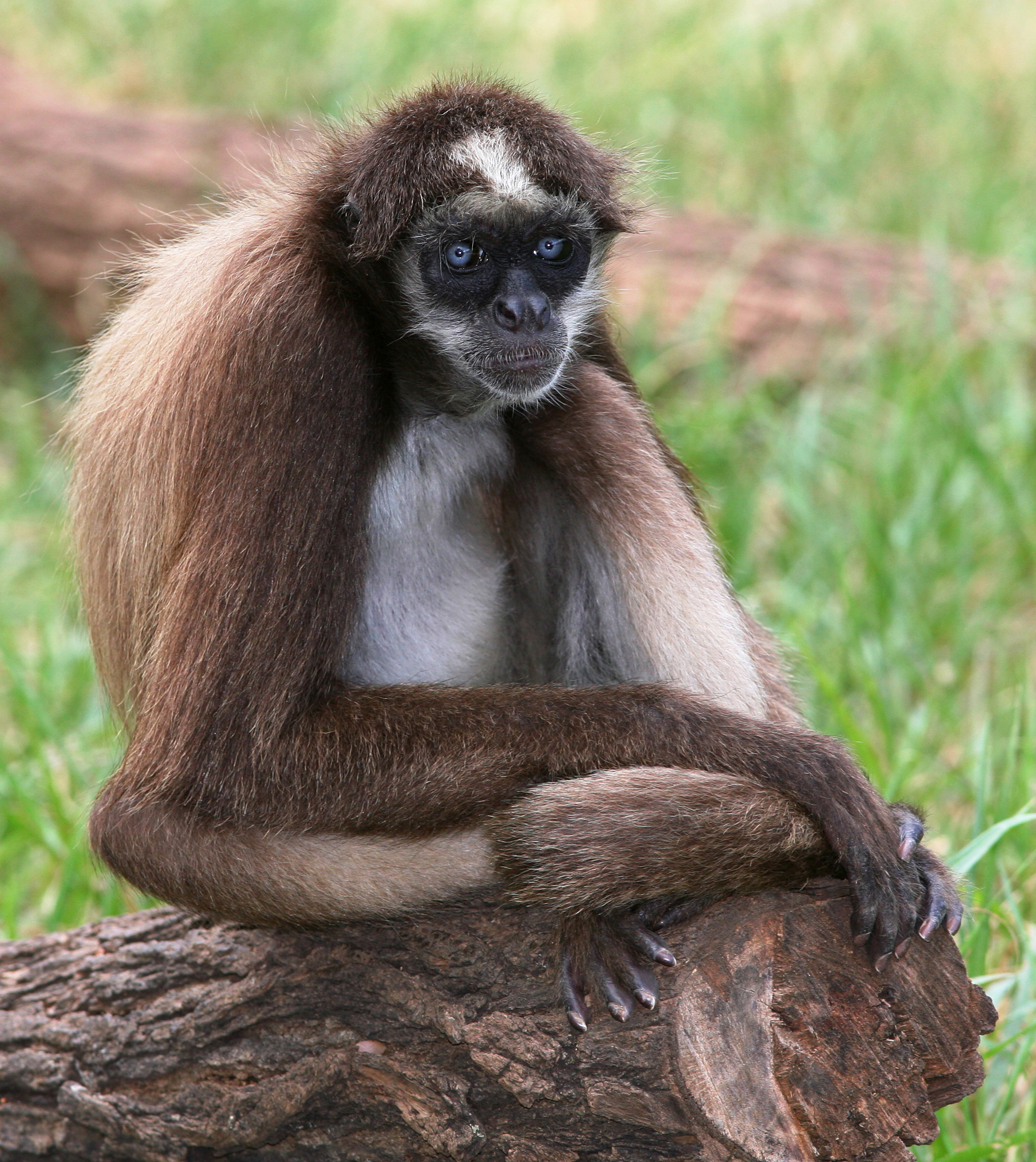
As is the case with all species of spider monkeys, the brown spider monkey is threatened by hunting and habitat loss.

Spider monkeys form loose groups, typically with 15 to 25 individuals, but sometimes up to 30 or 40. During the day, groups break up into subgroups. The size of subgroups and the degree to which they avoid each other during the day depends on food competition and the risk of predation. The average subgroup size is between 2 and 8 but can sometimes be up to 17 animals. Also less common in primates, females rather than males disperse at puberty to join new groups. Males tend to stick together for their whole lives. Hence, males in a group are more likely to be related and have closer bonds than females. Males also cement bonds through "grappling": prolonged hugging, face greeting, tail intertwining, and genital manipulation. However, the strongest social bonds are between females and their young offspring.

Spider monkey standing at the edge of a boat

Spider monkeys communicate their intentions and observations using postures and stances, such as postures of sexual receptivity and of attack. When a spider monkey sees a human approaching, it barks loudly similar to a dog. When a monkey is approached, it climbs to the end of the branch it is on and shakes it vigorously to scare away the possible threat. It shakes the branches with its feet, hands, or a combination while hanging from its tail. It may also scratch its limbs or body with various parts of its hands and feet. Seated monkeys may sway and make noise. Males and occasionally adult females growl menacingly at the approach of a human. If the pursuer continues to advance, the monkeys may break off live or dead tree limbs weighing up to 4 kilograms (8.8 lb) and drop them towards the intruder. The monkeys also defecate and urinate toward the intruder.

Spider monkeys are diurnal and spend the night sleeping in carefully selected trees. Groups are thought to be directed by a lead female, which is responsible for planning an efficient feeding route each day. Grooming is not as important to social interaction, owing perhaps to a lack of thumbs.

Spider monkeys have been observed avoiding the upper canopy of the trees for locomotion. One researcher speculated this was because the thin branches at the tops of trees do not support the monkeys as well.

At 107 grams (3.8 oz), the spider monkey brain is twice the size of the brain of a howler monkey of equivalent body size; this is thought to be a result of the spider monkeys' complex social system and their frugivorous diets, which consist primarily of ripe fruit from a wide variety (over 150 species) of plants. This requires the monkeys to remember when and where fruit can be found. The slow development may also play a role: the monkeys may live from 20 to 27 years or more, and females give birth once every 17 to 45 months. Gummy, presumably the oldest spider monkey in captivity, is presumed to have been born wild in 1962, resided at Fort Rickey Children's Discovery Zoo located in Rome, New York, and died at the age of 61, after living about twice as long as the average spider monkey.

== Diet ==
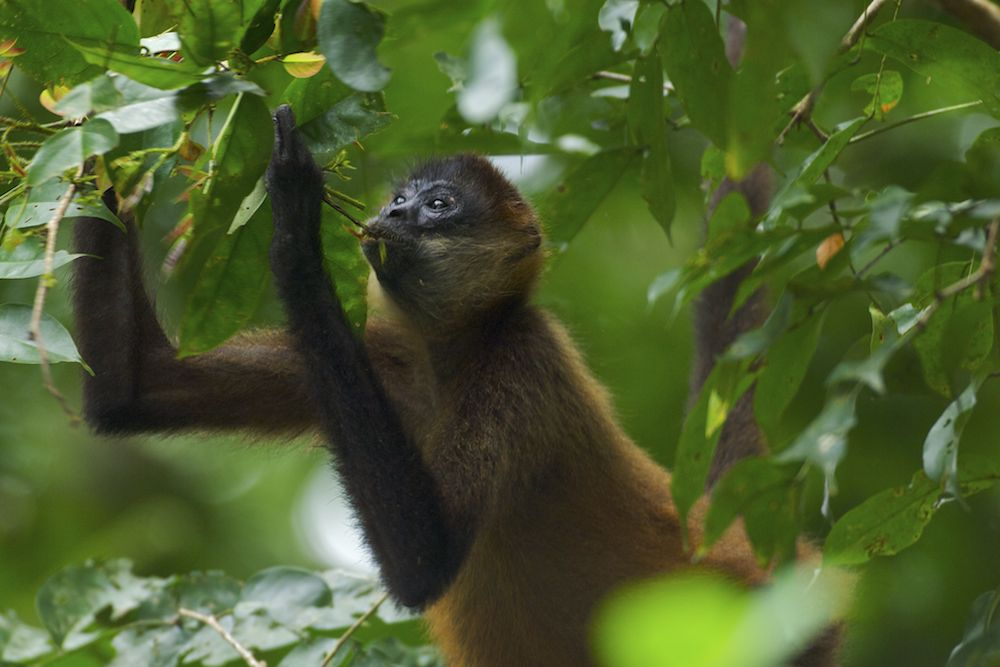
Geoffroy's spider monkey (Ateles geoffroyi) browsing, showing the exceptionally long limbs that give them their name.

Spider monkeys eat fleshy fruits 71 to 83 percent of the time. They can live for long periods on only one or two kinds of fruits and nuts. They eat the fruits of many big forest trees, and because they swallow fruits whole, the seeds are eventually excreted and fertilized by the feces. Studies show the diet of spider monkeys changes their reproductive, social, and physical behavioral patterns. Most feeding happens from dawn to 10 am. Afterward, the adults rest while the young play. Through the rest of the day, they may feed infrequently until around 10 pm. If food is scarce, they may eat insects, leaves, bird eggs, bark and honey.

Spider monkeys have a unique way of getting food: a dominant female is generally responsible for leading the searches for food. During the search for food, a regular group of spider monkeys will split into groups of 3, each led by the dominant female. Each group is closely associated with its territory.

== Reproduction ==
The female chooses a male from her group for mating. Both males and females use "anogenital sniffing" to check their mates for readiness for copulation. The gestation period ranges from 226 to 232 days. Each female bears only one offspring on average, every three to four years.

Until six to ten months of age, infants rely completely on their mothers. Males are not involved in raising the offspring.

A mother carries her infant around her belly for the first month after birth. After this, she carries it on her lower back. The infant wraps its tail around its mother's and tightly grabs her midsection. Mothers are very protective of their young and are generally attentive mothers. They have been seen grabbing their young and putting them on their backs for protection and to help them navigate from tree to tree. They help the more independent young to cross by pulling branches closer together. Mothers also groom their young.

Male spider monkeys are one of the few primates that do not have a penis bone (baculum).

== Cultural depictions ==
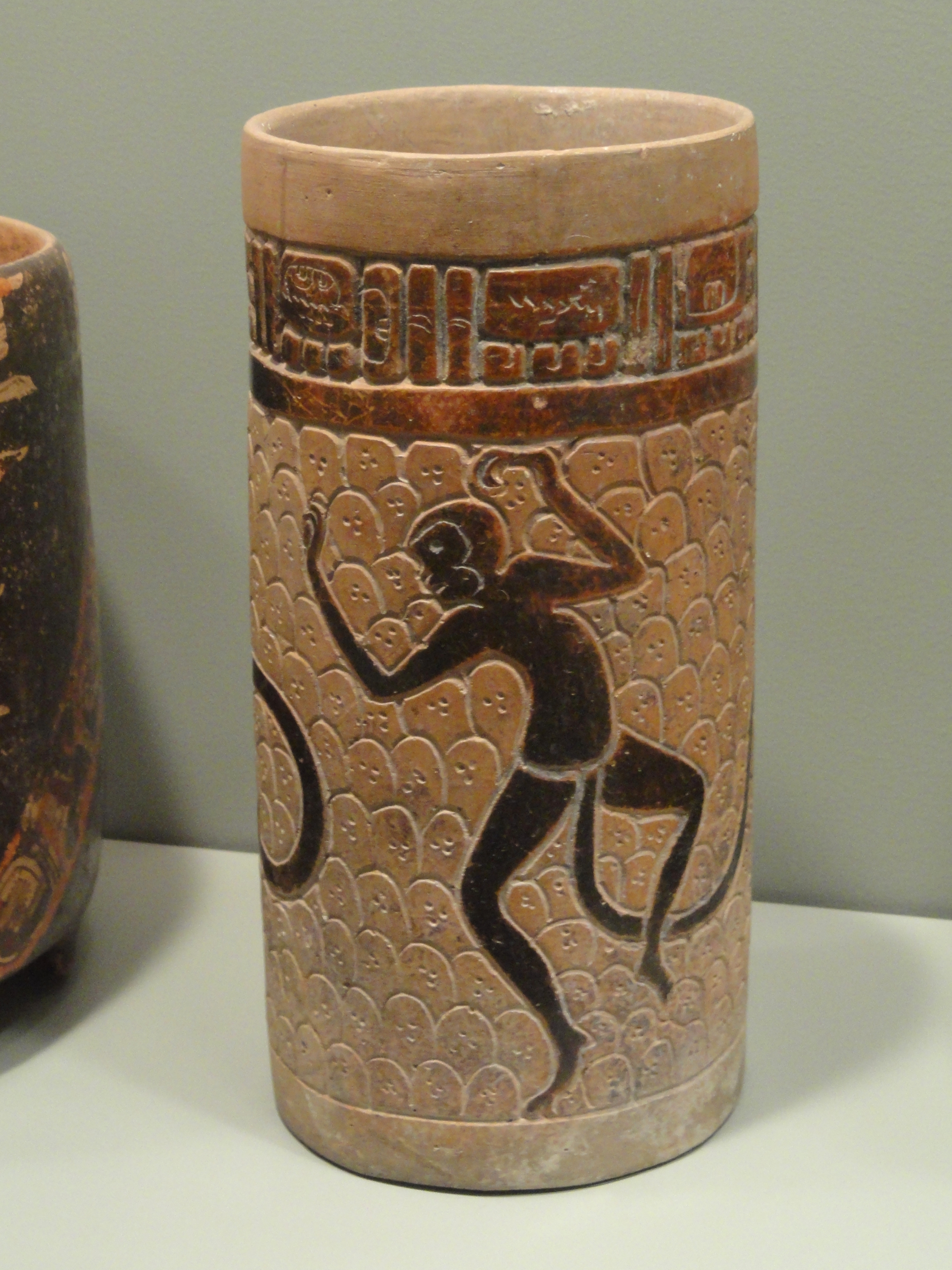
Maya vase depicting a spider monkey, 650–750 AD

Spider monkeys are found in many aspects of the Mesoamerican cultures. In the Aztec 260-day calendar, Spider Monkey (Nahua Ozomatli) serves as the name for the 11th day. In the corresponding Maya calendar, Howler Monkey (Batz) is substituted for Spider Monkey. In present-day Maya religious feasts, spider monkey impersonators serve as a kind of demonic clowns. In Classical Maya art, they are ubiquitous, often shown carrying cacao pods.

Captain Simian & the Space Monkeys features a spider monkey named Spydor who is the smallest of the crew.
