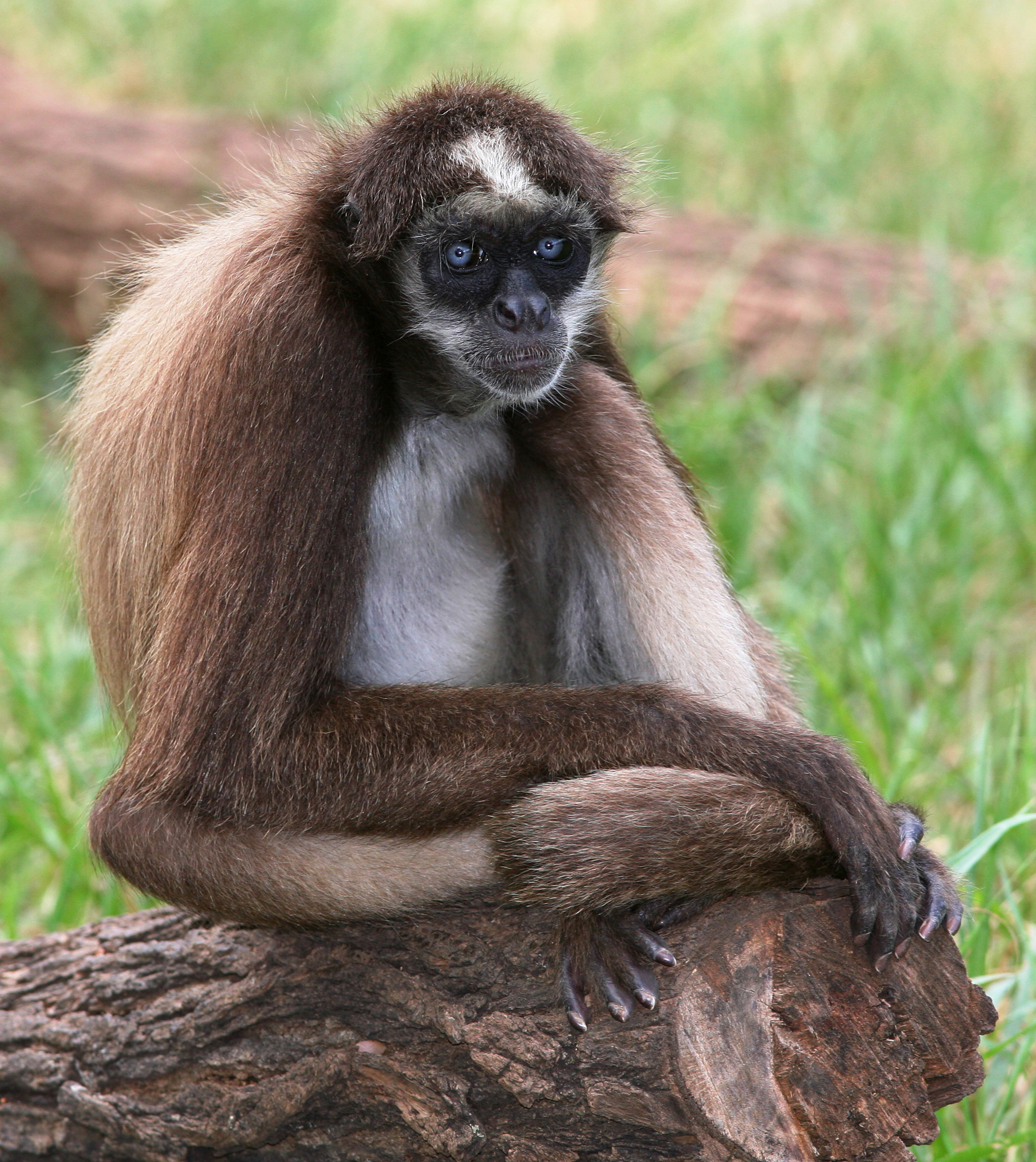
- At a zoo in Barquisimeto, Venezuela

Conservation status
- Critically Endangered (IUCN 3.1)

Scientific classification
- Kingdom: Animalia
- Phylum: Chordata
- Class: Mammalia
- Order: Primates
- Family: Atelidae
- Genus: Ateles
- Species: A. hybridus

Binomial name
- Ateles hybridus I. Geoffroy, 1829
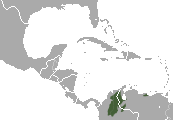
- Brown spider monkey range in green

= Brown spider monkey =

Species of New World monkey

The brown spider monkey or variegated spider monkey (Ateles hybridus) is a critically endangered species of spider monkey, a type of New World monkey, from forests in northern Colombia and northwestern Venezuela.

Like all spider monkeys, it has long, slender limbs and a long prehensile tail. The brown spider monkey has a whitish belly and patch on the forehead, and – highly unusual among spider monkeys – its eyes can be pale blue.

== Taxonomy ==
Some scientists recognize two subspecies, Ateles hybridus hybridus, found in both Colombia and Venezuela and Ateles hybridus brunneus, found between Cauca and Magdalena River in Colombia. Molecular studies have not supported the subspecies designations and treat the species as a single taxon.

== Physical description ==
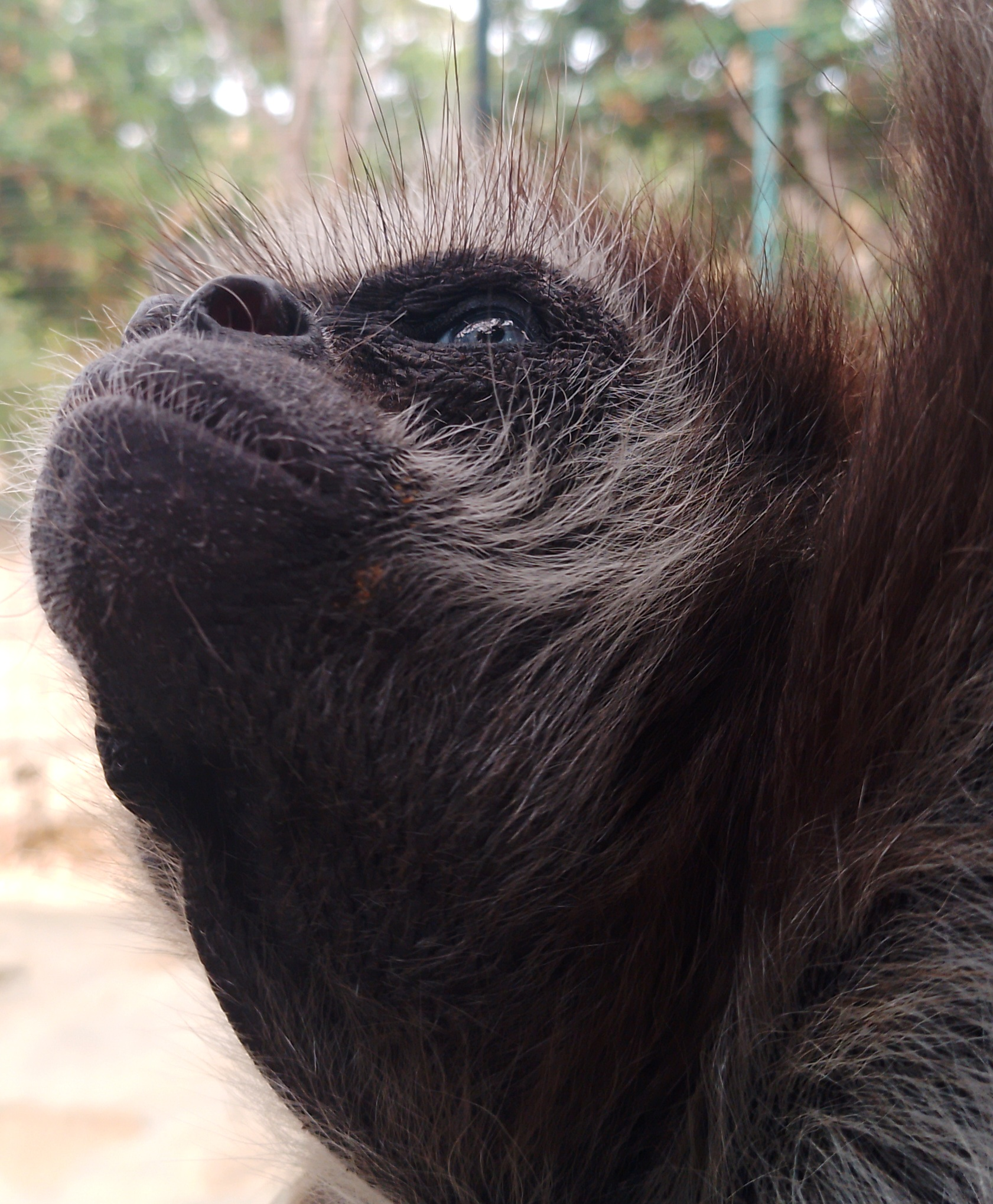
Closeup of head

The brown spider monkey has long and thin limbs with longer forelimbs than hind limbs. It has a distinctive 75 cm (30 in) long flexible, thin and prehensile tail which at times acts like a fifth limb. The tail has a highly flexible, hairless tip with skin grooves which improves grip. Brown spider monkeys have four curved fingers and lack thumbs to help them swing from one tree to another. These features make it possible for it to climb trees at high elevations, and hang and swing from one tree to another without often having to return to the ground. Adult males weigh between 7.9 and 9.1 kg (17 and 20 lb) and adult females weigh between 7.5 and 9 kg (17 and 20 lb). Its average adult body length is about 35 to 70 cm (14 to 28 in). Its coloration ranges from light brown to dark on upper parts including the head. Its most distinctive characteristic is a whitish triangular forehead patch, although not all individuals have one. Some have pale blue eyes but most are brown. Typically, the brown spider monkeys live between 10 and 27 years, but average about 22 years in the wild.

== Distribution ==
The brown spider monkey is found in northern Colombia and northwestern Venezuela. In Colombia, it is found from the right bank of the Magdalena River in the Magdalena and Cesar Departments, the south western portions of Guajira in the northernmost parts of the Serrania de Perija, and in the middle Magdalena River Valley at least to the Caldas and Cundinamarca Departments. In Venezuela, the brown spider monkey is normally found at altitudes between 20 and 700 m (66 and 2,297 ft).

The inter-Andean forest is also diminishing due to mining, infrastructure, and other industrial reinforcements. In addition, their recovery from population loss is due to their low reproductive rate. Typically, they reproduce every 2–3 years.

== Ecology and behaviour ==
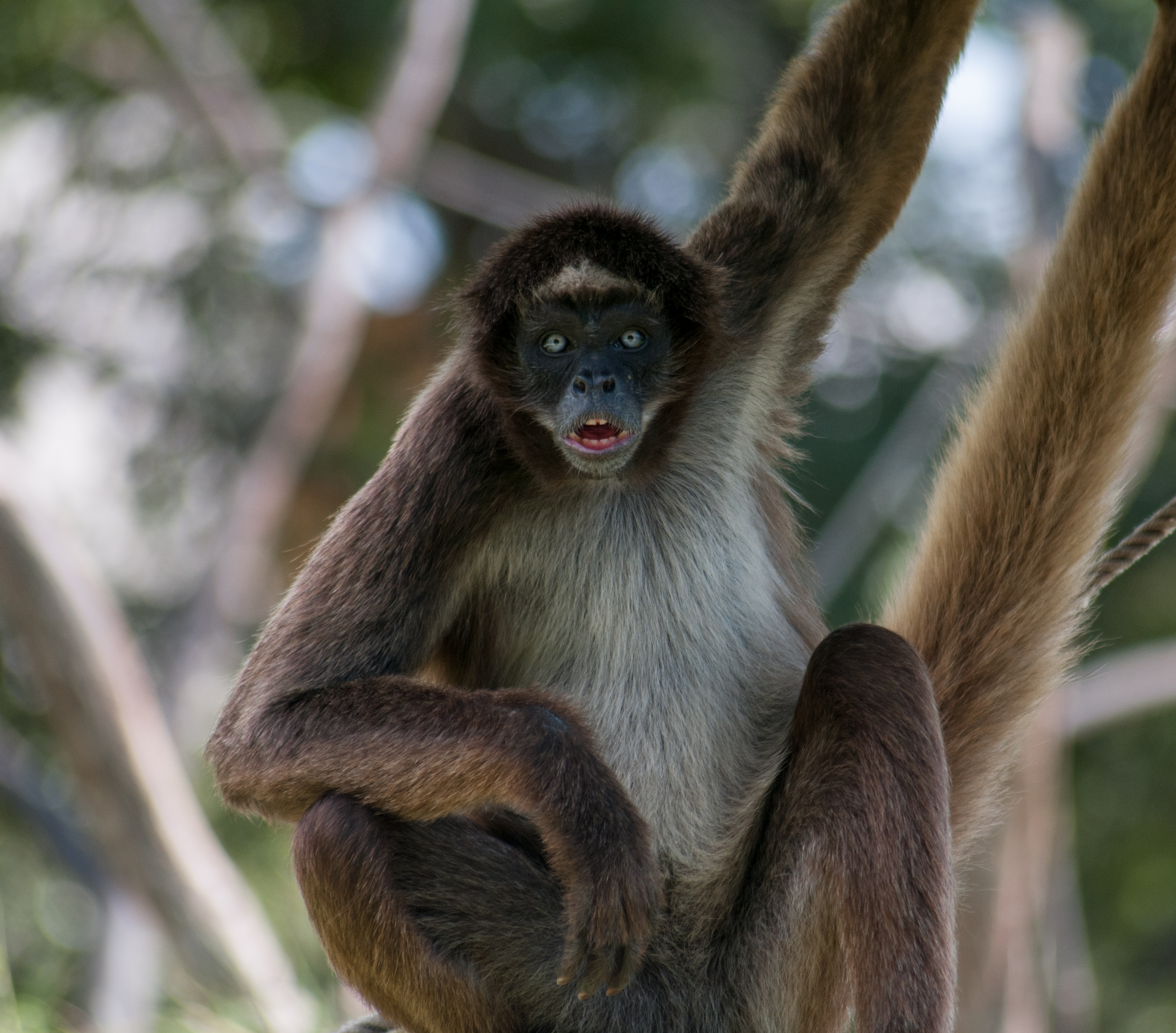
From Venezuela

Even though the brown spider monkey spends most of its time high in trees, it occasionally descends to eat soil and drink water. Since it forages in high canopies, it prefers undisturbed primary forests. The brown spider monkey travels in small groups, and instead of walking or running on all fours, it travels mostly by swinging and climbing between trees.

The brown spider monkey mainly forages in the forest canopy and relies mostly on its senses of sight, smell, taste, and touch to find food. It is mainly herbivorous and frugivorous. A main component of the brown spider monkey's diet is ripe fruit. Over three quarters of its diet is lipid-rich fruits. However, in drier seasons where fruit is less abundant, it feeds on leaves, seeds, flowers, bark, honey, decaying wood, and occasionally insects such as termites and caterpillars. The brown spider monkey feeds on different species of figs year around. Scientists have observed it eating soil and clay, and hypothesized that the reasons for this behavior could be to obtain minerals from the soil, for example phosphorus, or in order to maintain a pH-balance in its digestive system. The brown spider monkey finds water to drink on the forest floor at "salado sites." Competition for food occurs between spider monkeys and other frugivorous primates.

The fragmented lands that brown spider monkeys live in, causes their social behavior and ranging patterns to vary. The male-to-female aggression is very common and a consistent pattern, as it is a mechanism of social control for an indirect form of sexual coercion or a ritualized courtship.

Average lifespan of a spider monkey is 27 years, however, in captivity it can reach 40 years old.

Natural predators include jaguars (Panthera onca), mountain lions (Puma concolor), harpy eagles (Harpia harpyja), and crested eagles (Morphnus guianensis). The brown spider monkey is known to shake branches in order to ward off potential predators.

== Conservation ==
Video clip

Since 2004, the brown spider monkeys have been listed as one of the most endangered primates in Colombia's inter-Andean Valleys. This is due to habitat fragmentation, threats of hunting, and threats of capture for pet trade. The population is estimated to have decreased by at least 80% and some populations have already been extirpated. Few remaining populations are of adequate size to be viable long-term. Almost 60 brown spider monkeys were recorded at various zoo (mostly European) that participated in the International Species Information System in 2010, but breeding is slow. Habitat loss is ongoing within its wild range, and an estimated 98% of its habitat is already gone. Habitat loss is driven both by logging, and land clearance for agriculture and cattle ranches. It is also threatened by hunting (in some regions it is the favorite game) and the wild animals trade. One study did not show a significant difference between population densities inside versus outside forest areas disturbed by loggers. It has been hypothesized that this anomaly is due to the sample being taken from El Paujil reserve, which is a protected area and may serve as refuge from other human activities, namely poaching.

Conservation efforts such as alleviating the detrimental effects of fragmented landscapes on the brown spider monkey population are being pursued. Corridors are being utilized to direct the brown spider monkeys back to their natural habitat that has been severely fragmented. A recent study performed in Central Colombia found that 21 out of 32 vertebrate species have used corridors that connect them to landscapes that have been fragmented.

The IUCN is a group that is aiming to protect and grow the spider monkey population. They are raising money to help create corridors that connect them to all of the fragmented land. They are also aiming to educate the local human population that live amongst the spider monkeys to try and raise awareness and request more help.

A small population of fewer than 30 individuals has been discovered in a protected area of Colombia, the Selva de Florencia National Natural Park. This is the southernmost population of the brown spider monkey. Brown spider monkeys are also known from other reserves in both Colombia and Venezuela. Currently there are about 3,000 brown spider monkeys left in the forests of Colombia and Venezuela.
