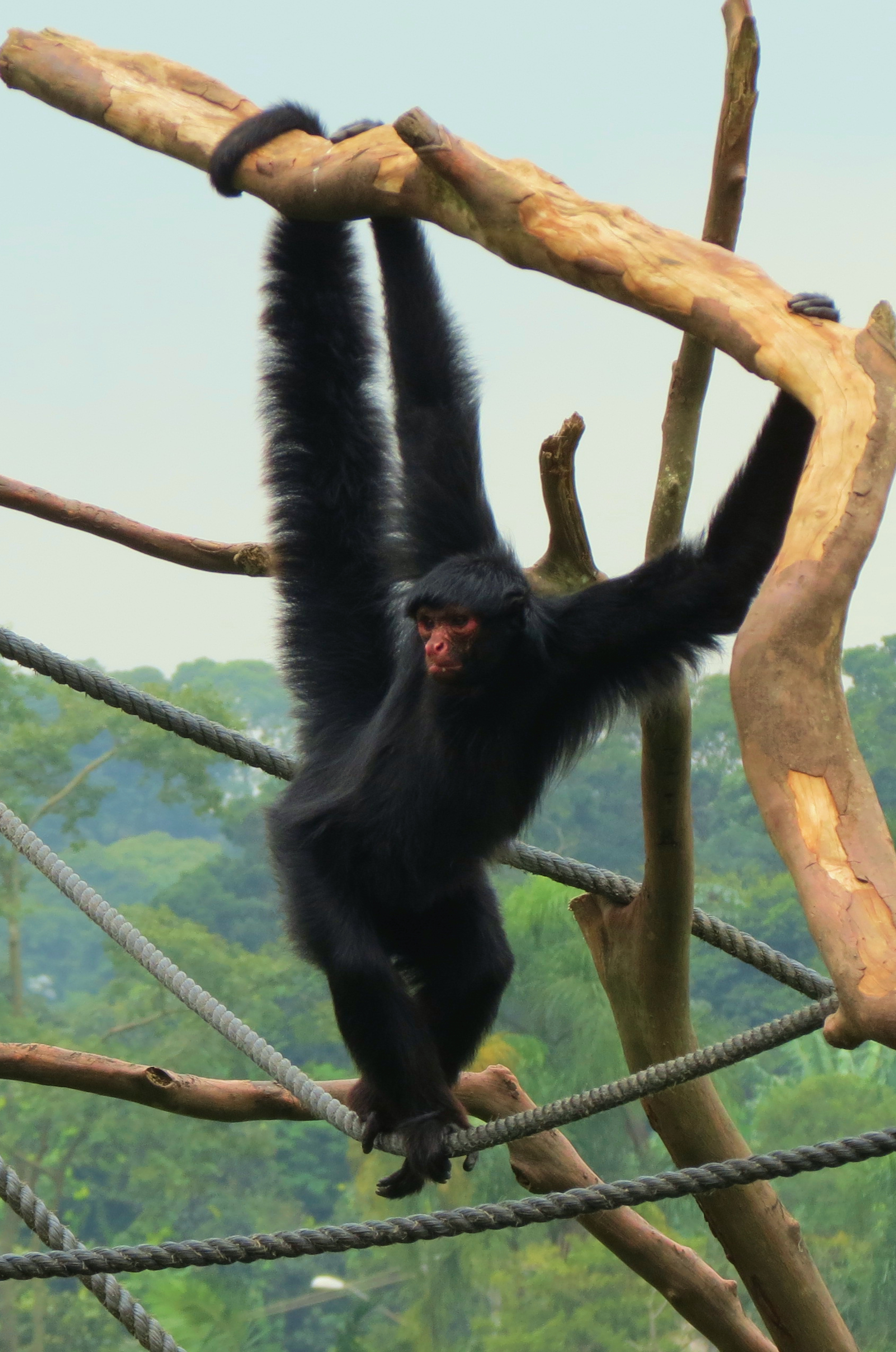
- Red-faced spider monkey in São Paulo Zoo, Brazil

Conservation status
- Vulnerable (IUCN 3.1)

Scientific classification
- Kingdom: Animalia
- Phylum: Chordata
- Class: Mammalia
- Infraclass: Placentalia
- Order: Primates
- Family: Atelidae
- Genus: Ateles
- Species: A. paniscus

Binomial name
- Ateles paniscus (Linnaeus, 1758)
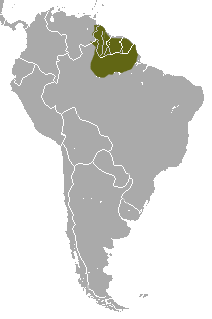
- Red-faced spider monkey range

Synonyms
- Simia paniscus Linnaeus, 1758

= Red-faced spider monkey =

Red-faced spider monkey Temporal range: Pleistocene to recent

Species of New World monkey

The red-faced spider monkey (Ateles paniscus), also known as the Guiana spider monkey or red-faced black spider monkey, is a species of spider monkey found in the rain forests in northern South America.

The species faces issues with hunting and habitat loss, so is listed as Vulnerable on the IUCN Redlist.

== Description ==
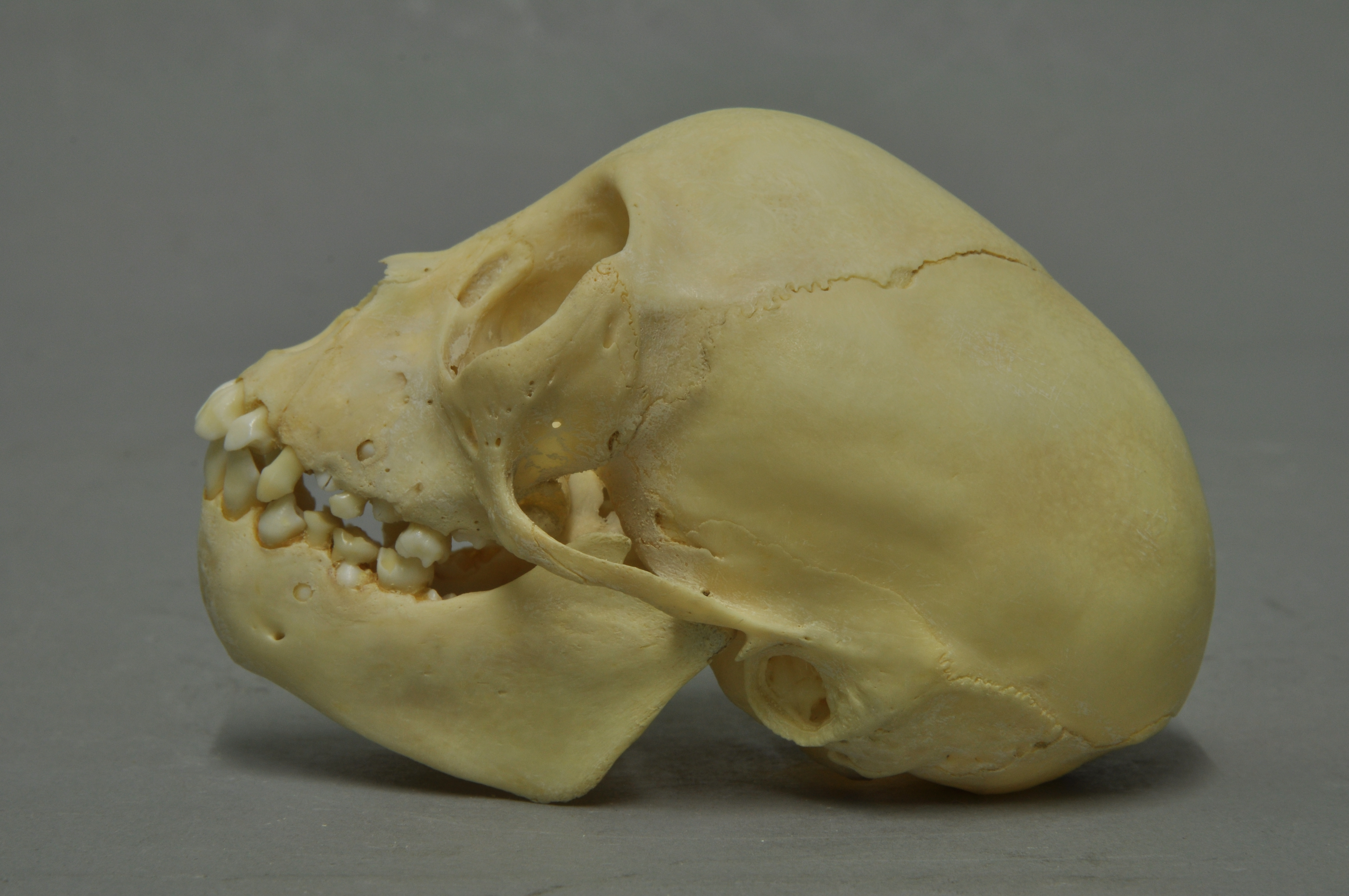
Skull of a red-faced spider monkey

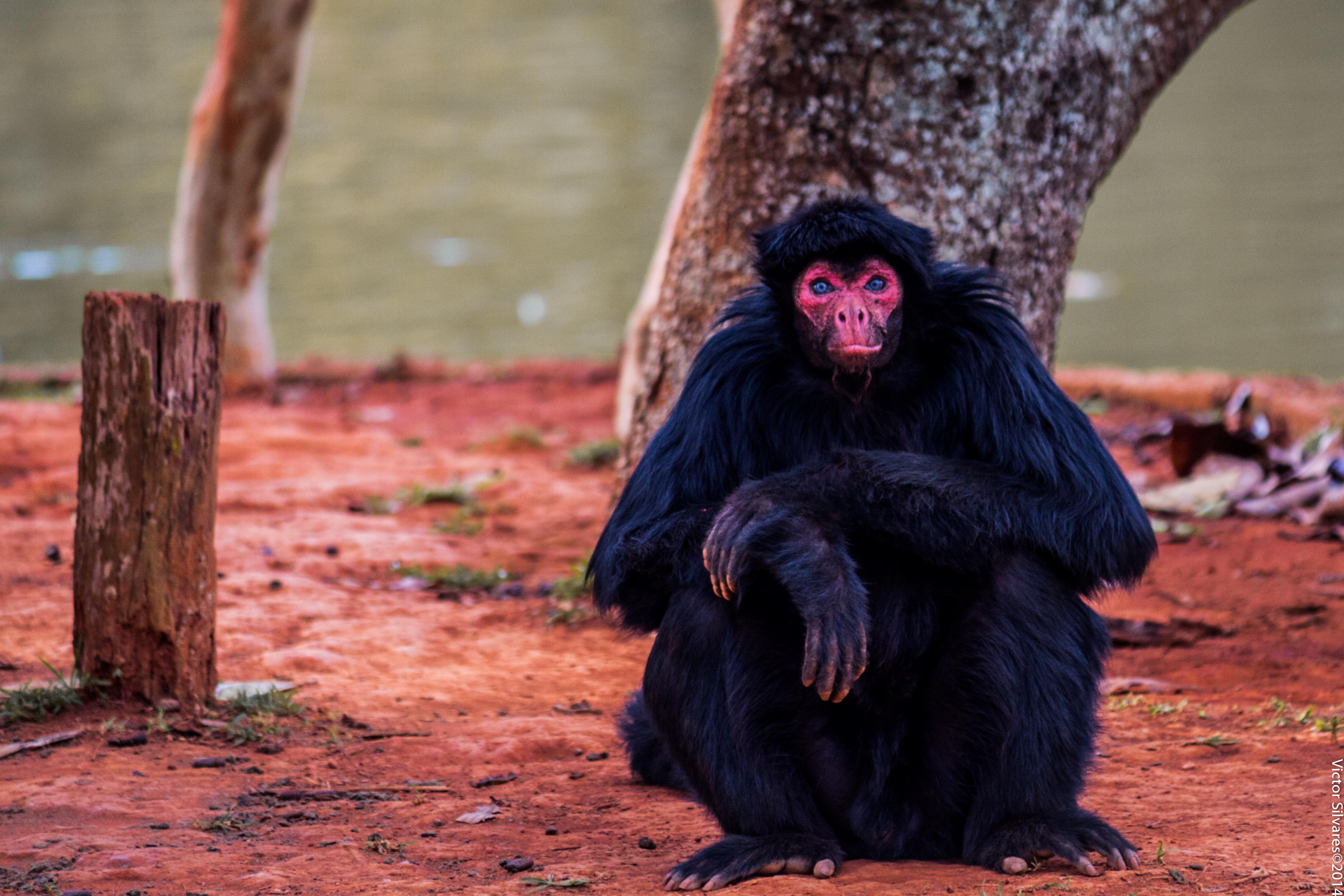
Ateles paniscus

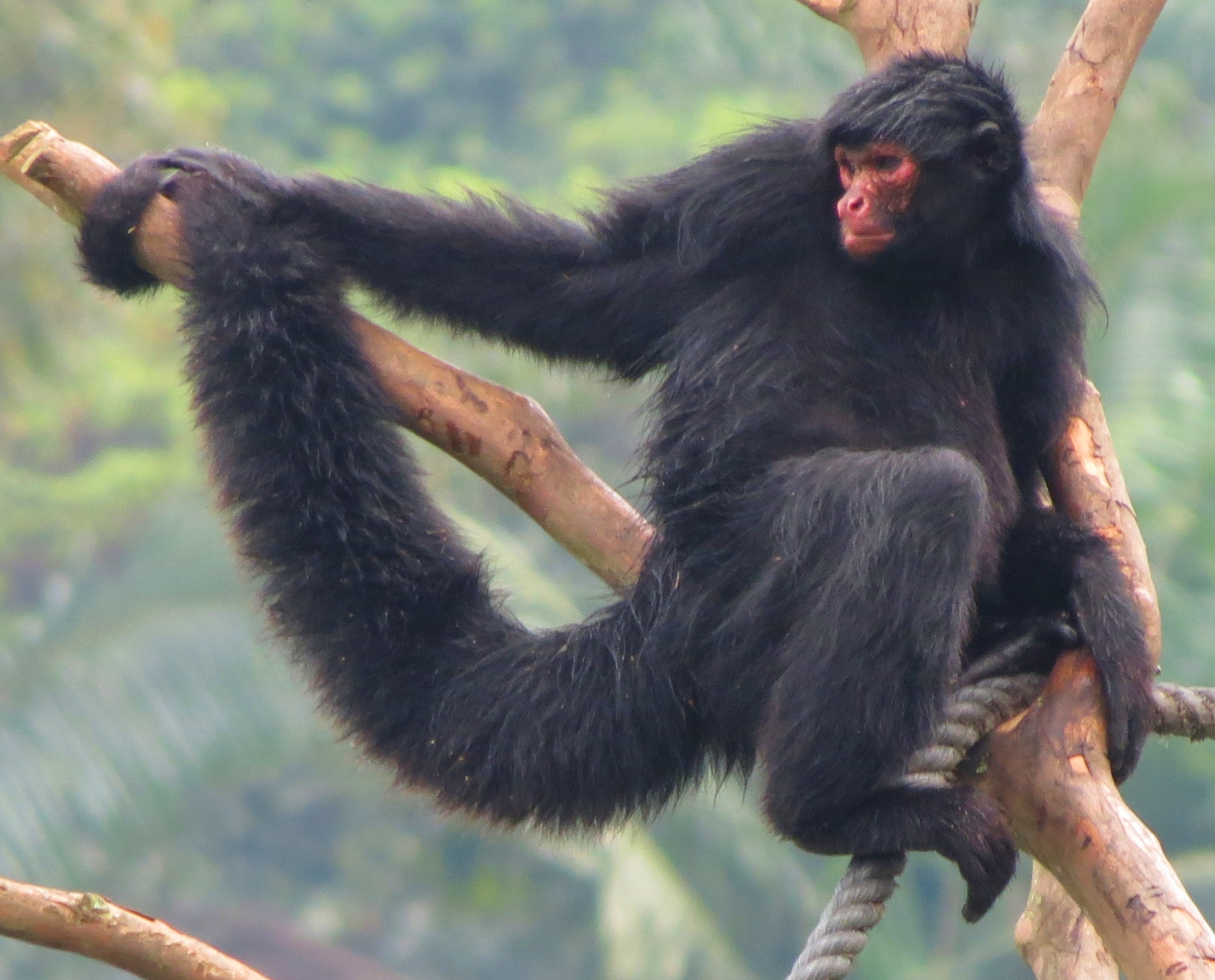
Red-Faced Spider Monkey at São Paulo Zoo

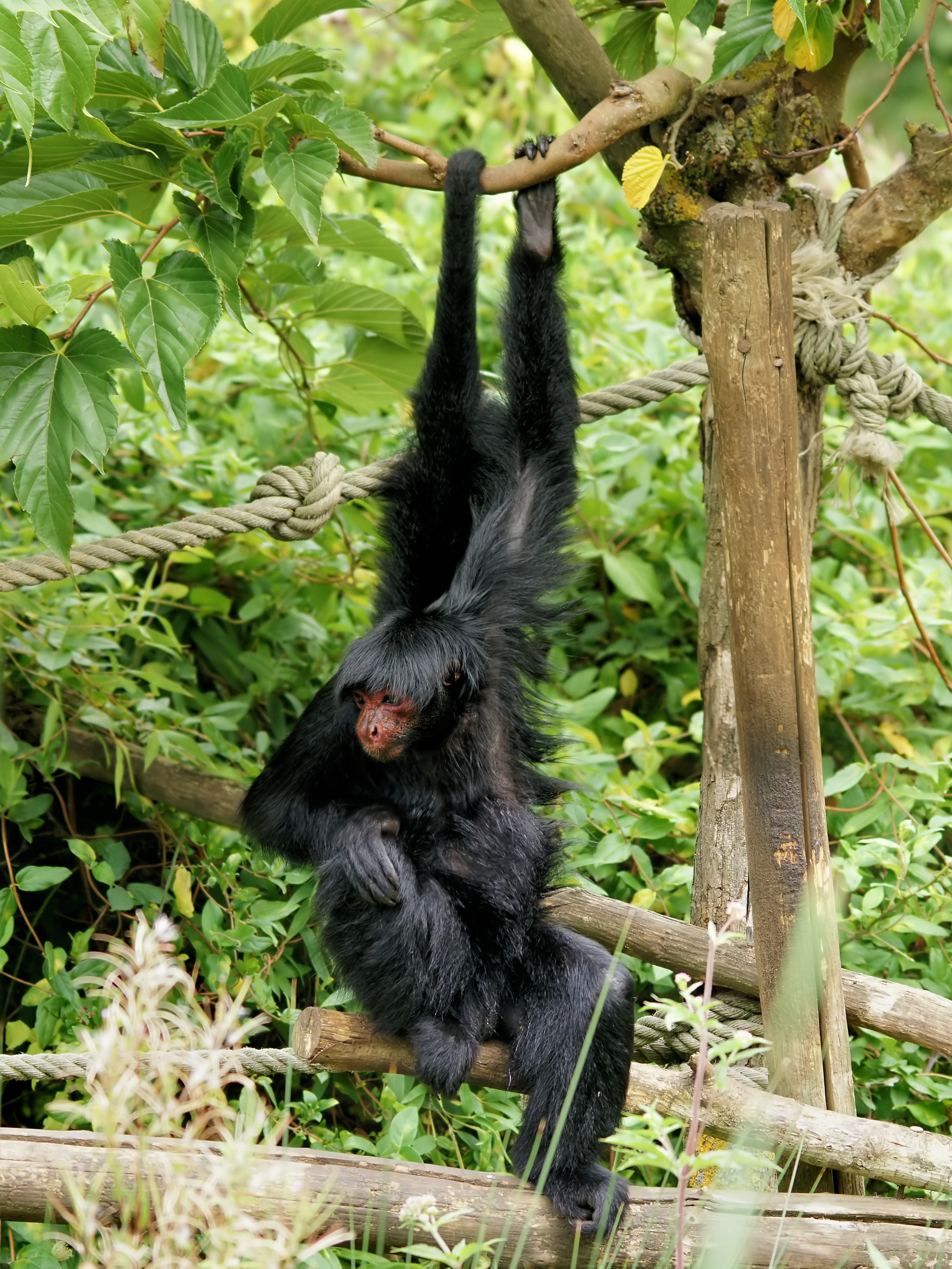
Red-Faced Spider Monkey at La Vallée des Singes, France

The red-faced spider monkey has long, black hair and a red or pink face that is bare except for a few short, white hairs. Infants are born with dark faces, which lighten as they age. Sexual dimorphism in the species is small; the head-body length of the male is 55.7 cm (21.9 in) on average, while the female is around 55.2 cm (21.7 in) in length. The male weighs around 9.1 kg (20 lb), while the female weighs around 8.4 kg (19 lb). The tail is prehensile (capable of grasping) and its fingers and limbs are long, agile and strong.

== Behavior ==
The red-faced spider monkey exhibits a fission-fusion society, associating with large groups of up to 30 individuals during the night, but choosing to spend the days travelling. At night, they often sleep in large groups called bands. Bands typically consist of several females, with their respective young, along with a few males for protection. The only range size estimate was 255 ha (630 acres), of which 220 ha (540 acres) had suitable habitat.

The red-faced spider monkey feeds on a variety of foods and would be considered an omnivore. It will eat termites and grubs, but also feeds on supple leaves, flowers, mature seeds, tips of roots, fungi, berries and fruit. They may also consume honey, decaying wood or tree bark.

It has a gestation period of 226–232 days, is weaned after four or five years when it reaches sexual maturity, and has a life span of up to 33 years in captivity.

== Habitat and distribution ==
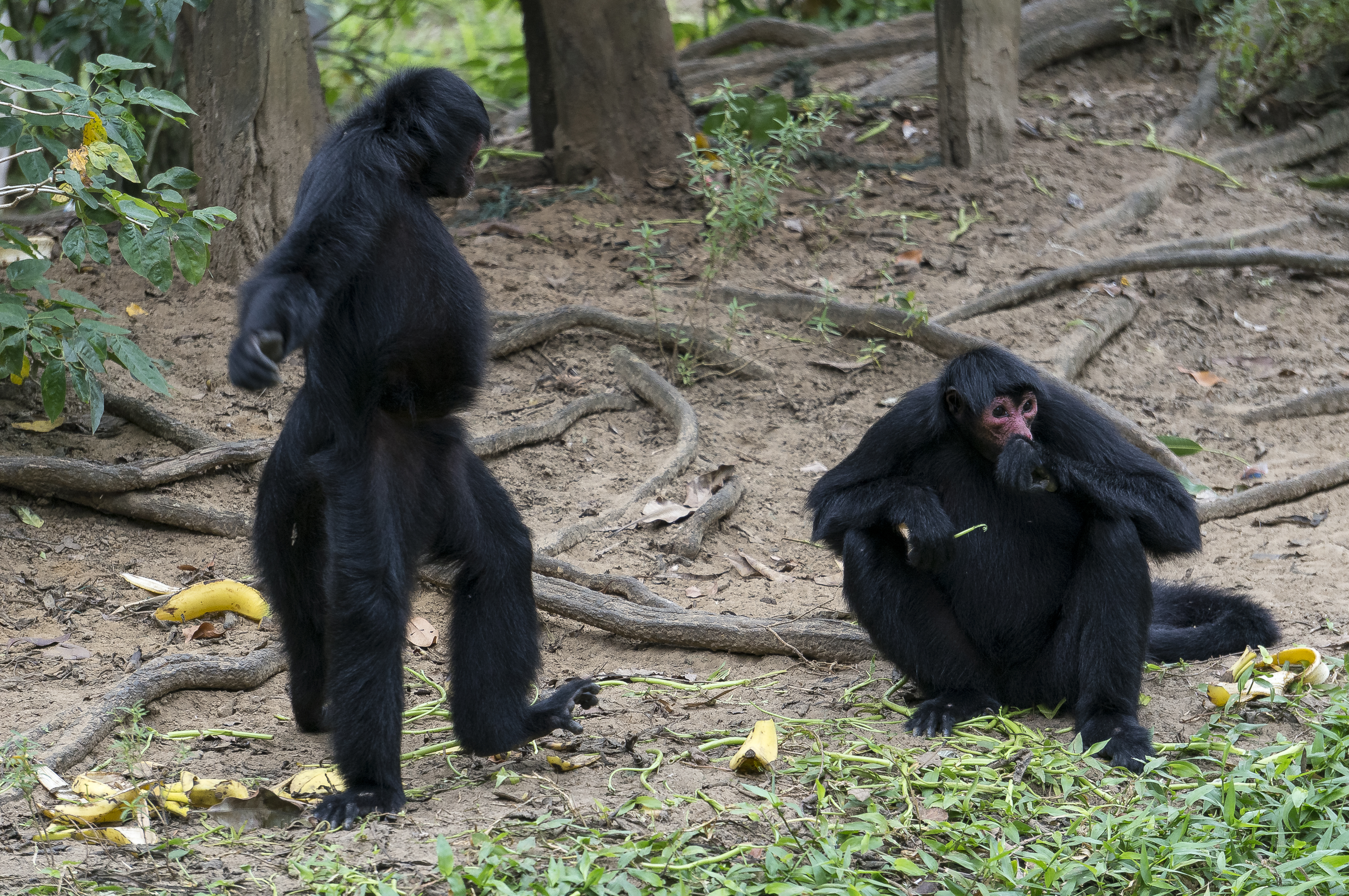
2 Red-Faced Spider Monkeys in Suriname

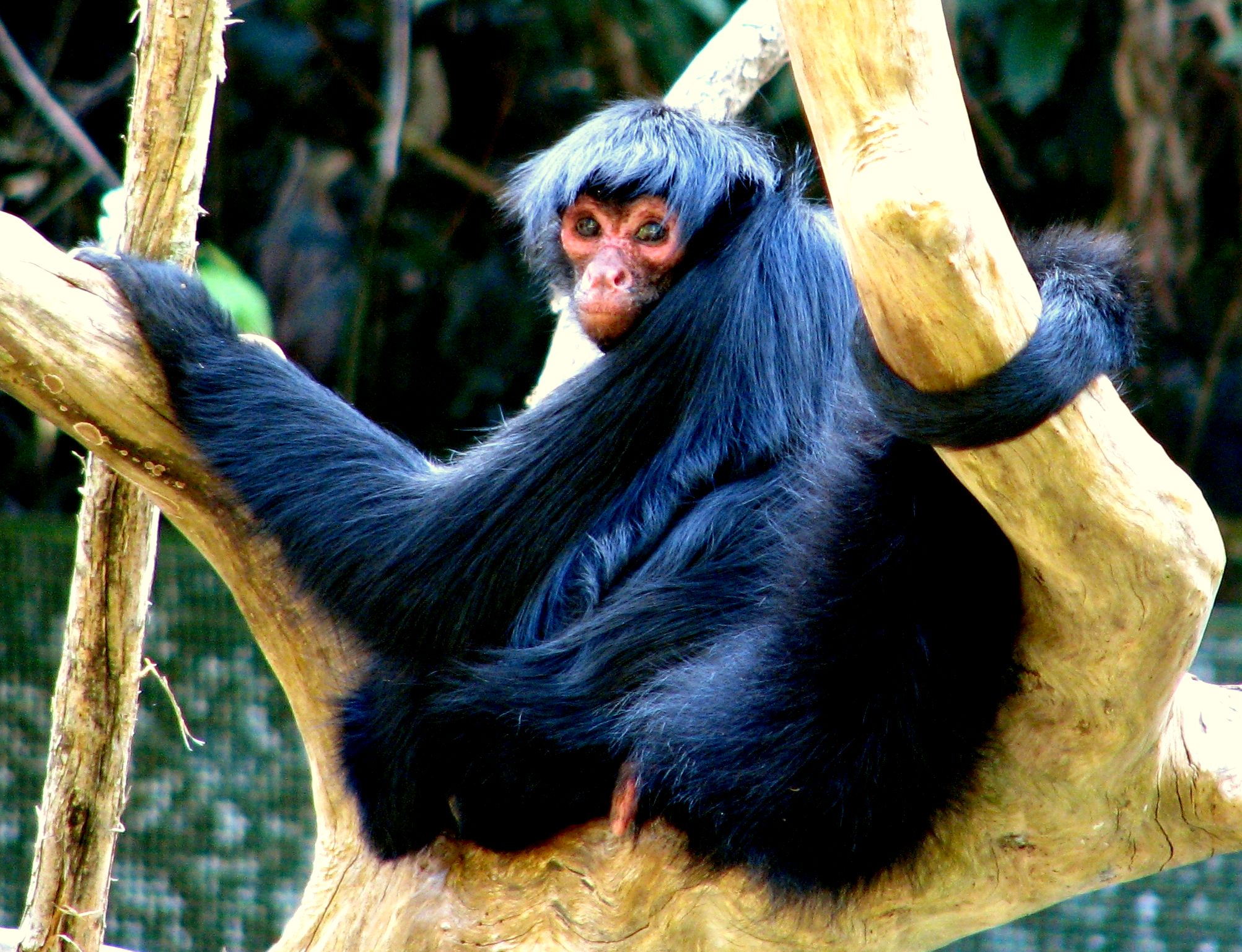
Red-Faced Spider Monkey in Brazil.

The red-faced spider monkey is a habitat specialist, found in undisturbed primary rainforests, in northern Brazil, Suriname, Guyana, French Guiana and Venezuela. Because of its ability to climb and jump, it tends to live in the upper layers of the rainforest trees and forages in the high canopy.

== Conservation ==
The red-faced spider monkey occurs in many protected area across its range, and is protected in the Amazon under the Amazon Animal Protection Act of 1973. It is listed by the IUCN Red List as Vulnerable.
