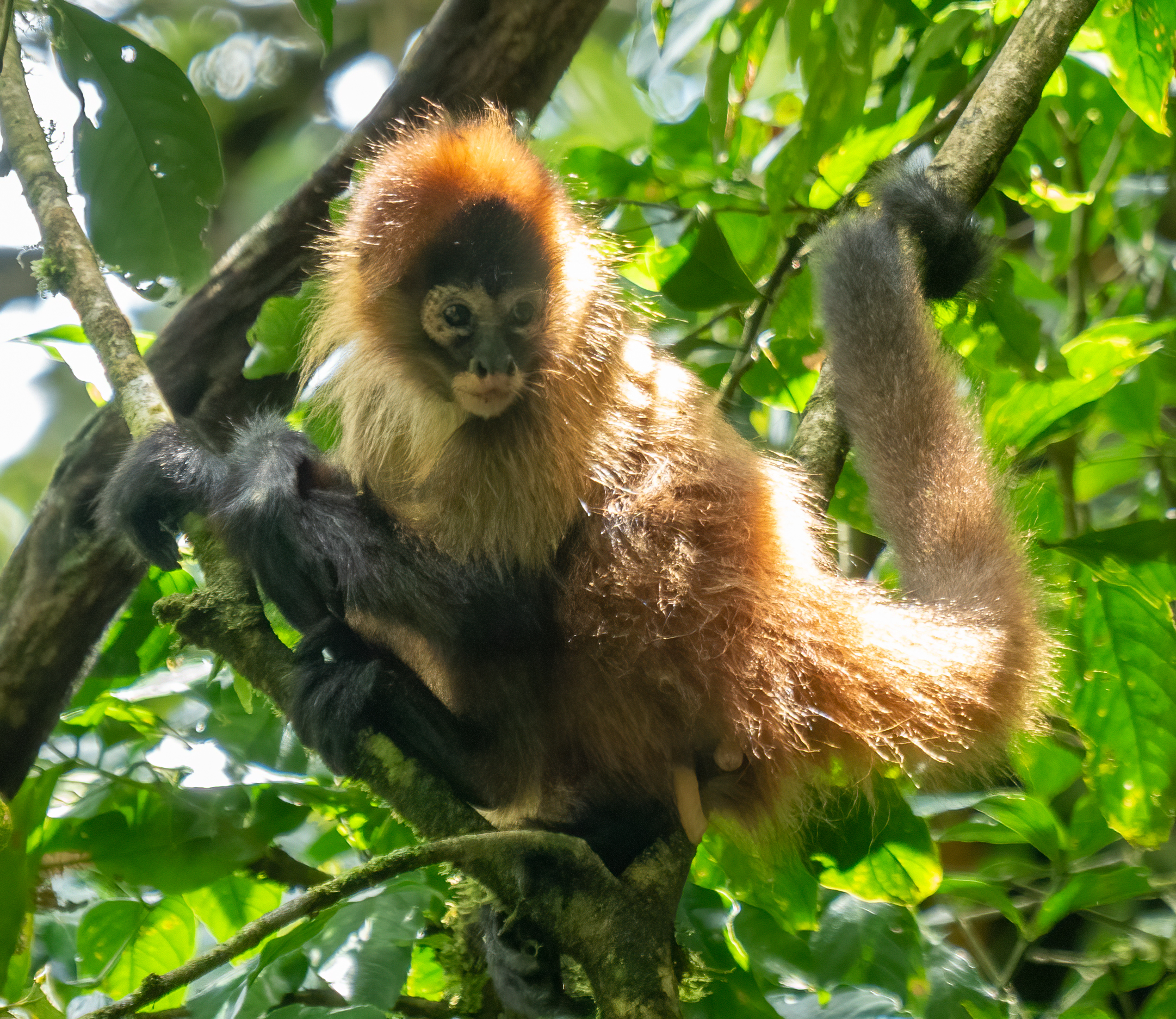

Conservation status
- Vulnerable (IUCN 3.1)
- CITES Appendix I

Scientific classification
- Kingdom: Animalia
- Phylum: Chordata
- Class: Mammalia
- Order: Primates
- Family: Atelidae
- Genus: Ateles
- Species: A. geoffroyi
- Subspecies: A. g. ornatus

Trinomial name
- Ateles geoffroyi ornatus (Gray, 1870)

Synonyms
- azuerensis Bole, 1937; panamensis Kellogg and Golman, 1944

= Ornate spider monkey =

Subspecies of New World monkey

The ornate spider monkey (Ateles geoffroyi ornatus) is a subspecies of Geoffroy's spider monkey, a type of New World monkey, from Central America, native to Costa Rica and Panama. Other common names for this subspecies include the brilliant spider monkey, the common spider monkey, the red spider monkey, the Panama spider ape, and the Azuero spider monkey; the latter two of which were previously thought to be distinct subspecies, panamensis and azuerensis, respectively.

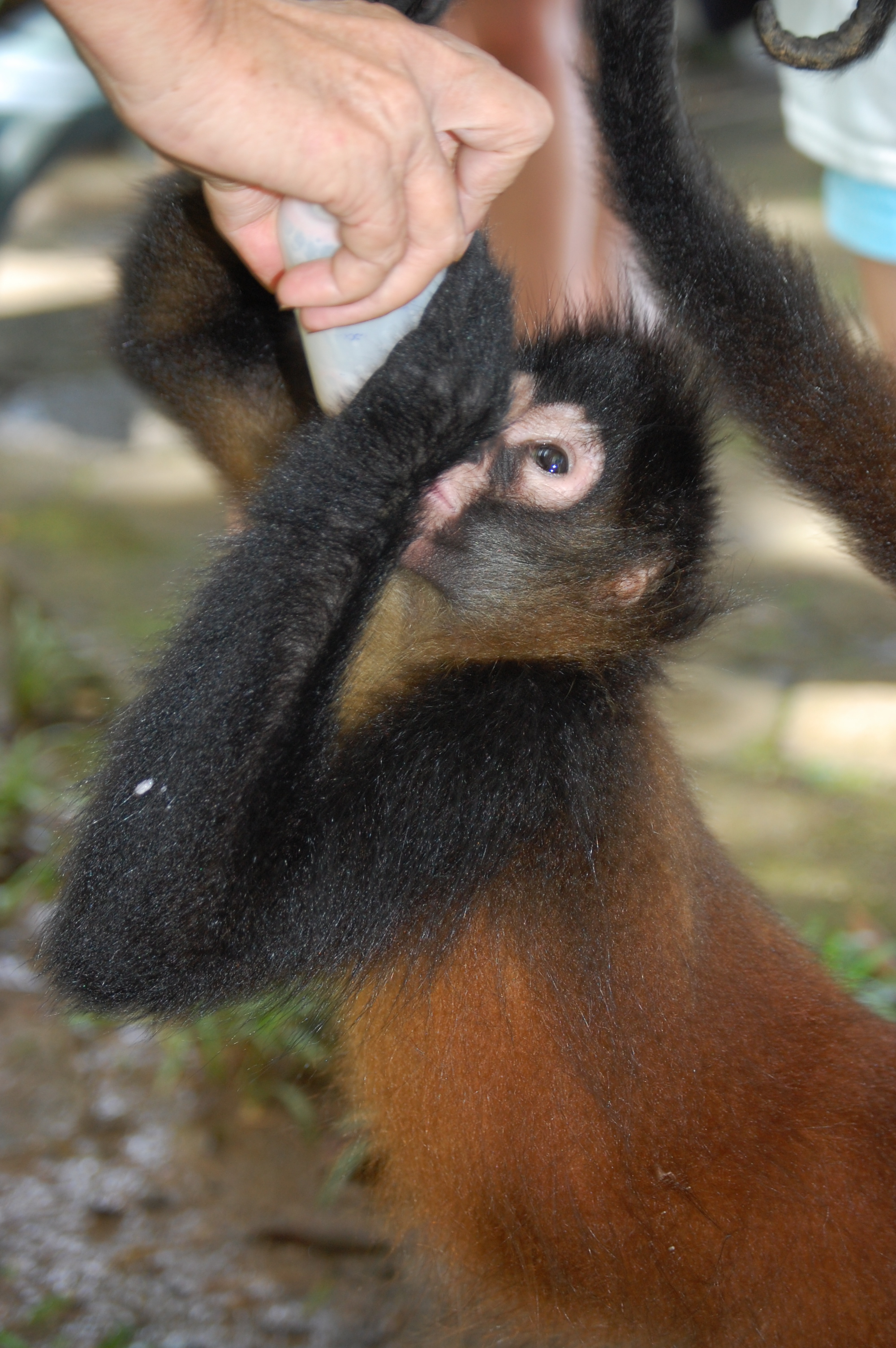
Female 22-month-old juvenile A. g. ornatus in a southern Costa Rica wildlife rehabilitation center. As a juvenile, her face is light colored, but it will darken upon sexual maturity.
