= Álvaro Coutinho Aguirre =

Brazilian agronomist, zoologist and naturalist

- Born: July 7, 1899; Santa Teresa, ES, Brazil
- Died: December 28, 1987 (aged 88); Rio de Janeiro, RJ, Brazil
- Education: Escola Superior de Agricultura e Medicina Veterinária
- Occupations: Agronomist; Zoologist; Naturalist
- Spouse: Eunice Coutinho
- Children: 2
- Father: Arminda Coutinho e Antônio de Araújo Aguirre

Álvaro Coutinho Aguirre (July 7, 1899 in Santa Teresa, ES – December 28, 1987 in Rio de Janeiro, RJ) was a Brazilian agronomist, zoologist and naturalist. Aguirre created the first reserve park for wild animals in Brazil, the Sooretama Biological Reserve at the state of Espírito Santo (the first protected area created in Brazil was in 1937. He dedicated his life to the preservation of the Brazilian flora and fauna, especially the Atlantic Forest and the biggest primate of the Americas, the Muriqui (Brachyteles arachnoids). During the 1960s, he undertook many expeditions to study the life and habits of the Muriqui and its conditions at the time. The results showed a considerable reduction of the groups of the animals, due to deforestation and lack of preservation of their habitat.

== Biography ==
Born in Santa Teresa, in the heart of the Atlantic Forest in the state of Espírito Santo, Álvaro Aguirre was the son of Arminda Coutinho e Antônio de Araújo Aguirre a road engineer, and grandson of Henrique da Silva Coutinho (1845-1915), farmer and governor of Espírito Santo. He married Eunice Coutinho, daughter of Artur Coutinho D´ Alvarenga and Virgínia Nunes Coutinho; they had two children. He had grown up in Niterói, at the state of Guanabara, and studied in Rio de Janeiro, at Colégio Pedro II. He graduated as agronomic engenieer from the Escola Superior de Agricultura e Medicina Veterinária, currently the Instituto de Agronomia, of the Universidade Federal Rural do Rio de Janeiro and was researcher of the Conselho Nacional de Pesquisas, CNPq. Heorked as Chief of the Researche Section of the Section of Hunting and Fishing of the Ministério da Agricultura, and was a member of the Fundação Brasileira para Conservação da Natureza e Sociedade de Agronomia.

== Professional life ==
Aguirre studied the flora and fauna of the Brazilian territory. As Chief of the Research Section of the Divisão de Caça e Pesca of Ministério da Agricultura, heundertook many expeditions to regions of the country to study and catalog the animal and plant life of the Brazilian forests. From the expeditions, many reports were published as articles and books about the conditions of individual species, as in As avoantes do Nordeste, about the "eared" dove (Zenaida auriculata) of the Northeast of the country; or the state of art of hunting and fishing in the five regions of Brazil; museum's collections with the taxidermist Antonio Domingos Aldrighi, former director of the Parque Nacional da Tijuca in Rio de Janeiro; and photo documented the fieldwork and the way of life of the population. The expeditions were accompanied by employees of the Divisão de Caça e Pesca, of the Ministério da Agricultura, besides Aldrighi, the veterinarian Ítalo Desiderati Romeu, the taxidermy assistant José Anacleto and the collector and photographer Aggio Neto.

In the beginning of the 1940, he created and oversaw the currently Reserva Biológica de Sooretama in the North of Espírito Santo. reserve is located between the cities of Vila Valério, Jaguaré, Linhares and Sooretama. The word "Soóretama" comes from the Tupi language; according to the etymologist Jacques Raimundo means "land of the forest animals". Initially, protection was extended to two areas - the Reserva Florestal Estadual do Barra Seca (1941) and the Parque de Refúgio de Animais Silvestres Soóretama (1943) -, which were later merged, and acquired the status of nature reserve in 1982, with the publication of the decree nº 87.588 of Federal Government. In 1999, the unit was included by the World Heritage Committee of UNESCO on the list of the exceptional ecological value to mankind, composing the Atlantic Forest biosphere. Today, the Reserve is an Integral Protection Conservation Unit and is attached to the Instituto Chico Mendes de Conservação da Biodiversidade – ICMBio.

The biggest continuous block of remaining Atlantic Forest of the state of Espírito Santo is composed by the Rebio Sooretama, the Reserva de Linhares (the Reserva Natural Vale of the Companhia Vale do Rio Doce), the private natural heritage reserve of Mutum Preto and Recanto das Antas. There are about 50 thousand hectares of little known Atlantic Forest, and it is the last refuge of animals, such as the jaguar in the state.

From the expeditions, Aguirre collected many species for study and research, and from 19430 through 1950 created the Fauna Museum at the Quinta da Boa Vista, currently belonging to the Fundação Jardim Zoológico do Rio de Janeiro. A significant part of the taxidermy samples, collected since the 1940s, donated by the Fundação Rio Zoo to the National Museum of Brazil of Rio de Janeiro, was lost in the fire of 2018.

During the 1960, as a researcher of CNPq, Aguirre undertook a long bibliographic review and several expeditions through the remaining blocks of Atlantic Forest, to study the conditions of life of the mono Brachyteles arachnoides (E. Geoffroy), the Muriqui. T

"It is too late for a research of complete results about the biodynamic of the" B. arachnoides "in its habitat. The region of geographic dispersion of the specie has suffered a serious and irreparable misfit in its ecosystems, caused by the nefarious action of man. Nonetheless, however, the researcher failed to apply his efforts and the means available to study the biological cycle of the specie" (Aguirre, 1971, p. 12)

The book relates the bibliography review, museology and fieldwork research through the states of Bahia, Minas Gerais, Espírito Santo, Rio de Janeiro, São Paulo and Paraná, in government and private reserves, farms and forests out of the protection zones. It contents also interviews with hunters, guides and local population and their contribution with information about the Muriqui. The researcher at the end suggests actions for protection and conservation of the mono habitat, in order to preserve the species dependent on having a continuous forest to survive.

== Recognition ==
The popularity of his work is due to researchers of the field that recognized his effort in documenting and analysing the species of Brazilian forests.

The obituary written by the Argentine researcher Enrique H. Bucher, his colleague and personal friend, published by the journal Ararajuba, of the Sociedade Brasileira de Ornitologia, relates not only the importance of his contribution for the preservation of the Brazilian fauna and flora, but also his biography. He describes aspects of his personality that became part of this "distinct line of Latin-Americans scientists that, besides the difficulties imposed by the time and adversal environment in which they acted, were able to offer important achievements to the science of their countries, thanks to their enormous creativity and dedication" (Bucher, 1990, p. 123).

At the same year, the science magazine Superinteressante (ano 4, n.11, nov. 1990) published the story As cordiais acrobacias do muriqui, and mentioned the Muriqui population of the Fazenda Montes Claros (MG), and its descoveried by the 1960 Aguirre's expeditions. The Fazenda belongs to the Reserva Particular do Patrimônio Natural Feliciano Miguel Abdala, which contain the biggest largest of Muriquis-do-Norte (Brachyteles hypoxanthus), specie belonged to the group of primates in risk of extinction. In 1992, the nephew Ângelo Arpini Coutinho and his friend Brunório Serafini republished, in Vitória (ES), as private edition the book Soóretama: Estudo sobre o Parque de Reserva, Refúgio e Criação de Animais Silvestres with the aim to spread his work.

In 2004, scientific institutions, political association and civil society movements for nature preservation supported the "Álvaro Aguirre" Expedition through Rio Doce, in the state of Espírito Santo. The coordinator was the historian José Lino França Galvão, and the expedition collected and catalogued the debris and botanical material along the river shores, between the city of Aimorés (MG) and Doce river's mouth, in Regência, Linhares (ES). Among seeds, seedlings and roots collected, 24 species became part of the collection at the Herbarium of the Universidade Federal do Espírito Santo. The expedition also produced a photo exhibition and a documentary movie and was supported by the Associação Colatinense de Defesa Ecológica (ACODE), the Comissão Interestadual Parlamentar de Estudos para o Desenvolvimento Sustentável da Bacia Hidrográfica do Rio Doce (CIPE), the Departamento de Botânica da UFES, the Mosteiro Zen Budista Morro da Vargem and the Instituto Terra.

In 2010, the Instituto de Pesquisas da Mata Atlântica (IPEMA) produced the educational "kit" O Muriqui composed by a book, a movie and an itinerant exhibition for schools located in regions where the specie is. The project aim was to educate and share knowledge to children, about the importance of biodiversity conservation. A successful example was the Projeto Muriqui.

In the Espirito Santo, most of the activities of the ´Projeto Muriqui´ is concentrated in Santa Maria de Jetibá. We developed partnerships with schools aiming to spread the scientific knowledge about the specie and contribute to children education. The results were very promising, showing that teachers and students are very receptive to the use of the theme ´biological conservation´ in their activities.

— Mendes, Silva & Stirer, 2010, p. 68

The educational "kit" - O Muriqui - highlighted the pioneer researchers and conservationists working on species protection, such as Álvaro Aguirre, Feliciano Abdala, Russell Mittermeier, Célio Valle, Adelmar Coimbra Filho and Ibsen Câmara, documented with picture of the scientific meeting in 1982, at a lecture in Rio de Janeiro promoted by the Fundação Brasileira para a Conservação da Natureza. The educational kit had the support of the CNPq, IPEMA, Fundação de Apoio à Pesquisa do Estado do Espírito Santo (FAPES), Instituto Estadual de Meio Ambiente e Recursos Hídricos (IEMA), Conservação Internacional - Brasil, and was produced by the Department of Biological Sciences of the UFES and by the Museu de Biologia Prof. Mello Leitão.

In 2013, the Reserva Biológica de Sooretama celebrated its 70 years with an ecological walk. As hommage and to recognize the effort of its founder, the Reserva produced seedlings of the pau-brasil specie, from a sample planted by Álvaro Aguirre in the park. The seedlings were distributed to the participants with educational material about the Reserva Biológica de Duas Bocas, created by Instituto Últimos Refúgios

== Publications ==
- Aguirre, A. & Aldrighi, A. (1987) Catálogo das aves do Museu da Fauna. 2^{a} parte. Rio de Janeiro, RJ: Delegacia Estadual do Estado do Rio de Janeiro, Instituto Brasileiro de Desenvolvimento Florestal; Vale do Rio Doce.
- Aguirre, A. & Aldrighi,, A. (1983) Catálogo das aves do Museu Fauna. 1^{a} parte. Rio de Janeiro, RJ: Delegacia Estadual do Estado do Rio de Janeiro, Instituto Brasileiro de Desenvolvimento Florestal.
- Aguirre, A. (1976) Distribuição, costumes e extermínio da "avoante" do nordeste, Zenaida auriculata noronha Chubb. Rio de Janeiro, RJ: Academia Brasileira de Ciências.
- Aguirre, A. (1975) Contribuição para o estudo do conteúdo gástrico da Zenaida auriculata (DesMurs). Rio de Janeiro, RJ: Brasil Florestal 6(24): 59-68.
- Aguirre, A. (1974) Contribuição para o estudo do conteúdo gástrico da Zenaida auriculata (Des Murs). Rio de Janeiro, RJ: Brasil Florestal. 5(18): 61-67.
- Aguirre, A. (1973) Contribuição para o estudo do conteúdo gástrico da Zenaida auriculata (Des Murs). Rio de Janeiro, RJ: Brasil Florestal. 4(16): 71-75.
- Aguirre, A. (1972) Nidificação da Zenaida auriculata (Des Murs). Rio de Janeiro, RJ: Brasil Florestal 3(12):14-18.
- Aguirre, A. (1971). O Mono Brachyteles arachnoides (E. Geoffroy) Rio de Janeiro, RJ: Academia Brasileira de Ciências.
- Aguirre, A. (1967) Contribuição a um plano visando a preservação da fauna Rio de Janeiro, RJ: Ministério da Agricultura/Serviço de Informação Agrícola.
- Aguirre, A., Schubart, O. & Sick, H. (1965) Contribuição para o conhecimento da alimentação das aves brasileiras. São Paulo, SP: Arquivos de Zoologia 12: 95–249. Departamento de Zoologia.
- Aguirre, A. (1964) As avoantes do Nordeste Rio de Janeiro, RJ: Ministério da Agricultura/Serviço de Informação Agrícola (Estudos Técnicos nº 24).
- Aguirre, A. (1962) Estudo sobre a biologia e consumo da Jaçanã Porphyrula martinica (L) no estado do Maranhão. Rio de Janeiro, RJ: Separata dos Arquivos do Museu Nacional, 52: 9-20.
- Aguirre, A. (1959) Aspectos da vida do Caranguejo e sistema de sua exploração no município de São Mateus e Conceição da Barra no estado do Espírito Santo. Rio de Janeiro, RJ: Ministério da Agricultura/DNPA, Boletim de Caça e Pesca.
- Aguirre, A. (1959) Contribuição ao estudo da biologia do Macuco, Tinamus solitarius (Vieillot) - Ensaios para sua criação doméstica Parque "Sooretama". Notas sobre a outra espécie do gênermo Tinamus. Rio de Janeiro, RJ: Ministério da Agricultura.
- Aguirre, A. (1956) Contribuição ao estudo da biologia do jacaré-açu Melanosuchus niger (Spix). Rio de Janeiro, RJ: Ministério da Agricultura.
- Aguirre, A. (1954) A caça e a pesca no Vale do Rio Doce: estado do Espirito Santo Rio de Janeiro, RJ: Ministério da Agricultura, Divisão de Caça e Pesca, 1954.
- Aguirre, A. [(1951) 1971] Sooretama (Estudo sobre o Parque de Reserva, Refúgio e Criação de Animais Silvestres). Rio de Janeiro, RJ [Vitória, ES): Serviço de Informação Agrícola, Ministério da Agricultura. [Edição particular, autorizada pela família do autor. COUTINHO, Ângelo A.; SERAFINI, Brunório] p.50
- Aguirre, A. (1947). Sooretama: estudo sobre o parque de reserva, refúgio e criação de animais silvestres, “Sooretama”, no Município de Linhares, Estado do Espírito Santo. Rio de Janeiro, RJ: Boletim do Ministério da Agricultura, Rio de Janeiro, 36:1-52.
- Aguirre, A. (1945) A caça e a pesca no pantanal do Mato Grosso Rio de Janeiro, RJ: Ministério da Agricultura, 1945.
- Aguirre, A. (1939) A pesca da Tainha e seu valor econômico e industrial no estado do Rio Grande do Sul. Rio de Janeiro, RJ: A voz do mar, XVIII (160).
- Aguirre, A. (1936 ) A pesca e a caça no alto São Francisco. Rio de Janeiro, RJ: Ministério da Agricultura, Divisão de Caça e Pesca.
