= Cartelles =

Cartelles Temporal range: Pleistocene

Scientific classification
- Kingdom: Animalia
- Phylum: Chordata
- Class: Mammalia
- Infraclass: Placentalia
- Order: Primates
- Family: Atelidae
- Subfamily: Alouattinae
- Genus: †Cartelles; Halenar & Rosenberger, 2013
- Species: †C. coimbrafilhoi

Binomial name
- †Cartelles coimbrafilhoi Halenar & Rosenberger, 2013

Extinct genus of New World monkey

Cartelles is an extinct monotypic genus of Pleistocene New World monkey. Fossils of this species were found in the Toca da Boa Vista caves of Bahia, Brazil, and were first assigned to another extinct Atelidae genus, Protopithecus, before being recognized as distinct.

== Research history and taxonomy ==
Danish paleontologist Peter Wilhelm Lund described Protopithecus brasiliensis from a distal humerus and proximal femur found in a cave of Lagoa Santa, Minas Gerais, in 1836. These bones are about twice the size of the largest extant platyrrhines. In 1895, Herluf Winge reassigned Lund's material to the genus Eriodes, now part of Brachyteles, and the material fell into obscurity for over one hundred years.

In 1992, two nearly complete large primate skeletons were discovered in Toca da Boa Vista, Bahia. One was described as a new genus and species, Caipora bambuiorum, while the other was assigned to Lund's Protopithecus brasiliensis, as it was the first primate material of comparable size discovered since Lund's originals. The genus Protopithecus was restored by paleontologists Cástor Cartelle and Walter Hartwig, who noted that the new material was closer to Alouatta in its skull morphology, and Brachyteles in its post-cranial anatomy. However, a 2013 study revealed the existence of an expanded brachioradialis flange on the humerus and gluteal tuberosity on the femur of the new material that was not present in either Lund's or any other known platyrrhine. As these morphological differences cannot be explained by instraspecific variation, a new genus and species were created for the 1992 material, Cartelles coimbrafilhoi. The name honors Cástor Cartelle and Brazilian primatologist Adelmar Faria Coimbra-Filho.

Further cranial and postcranial evidence suggest that Cartelles is more closely related to howler monkeys of the genus Alouatta (subfamily Alouattinae), while Protopithecus belongs to the Atelinae subfamily (spider and wooly monkeys) as a close relative of Brachyteles.

== Description ==
The known individual, believed to be male, is estimated to have weighted between 25 and 28 kg when it was alive. This is heavier than Protopithecus (whose bones were also less robust than Cartelles), and more than twice the weight of any living New World monkey. Only the also extinct genera Stirtonia, Solimoea, Paralouatta, and Caipora rival Cartelles in size.

The jaw stuck out further than the rest of the face, and the face was dorsally rotated, with an upturned snout. The skull had marked temporal lines and temporo-nuchal crests, and the brain was small for its size. These and other features resemble Alouatta, but its proportionally large incisors and bunodont cheek teeth were markedly different to the latter genus, which has relatively small incisors and cristodont molars. This dentition is more akin to that of Lagothrix and Paralouatta. The postcranial skeleton was robust and the neck was short. Neither shoulder, hip, limbs, or vertebral column show any adaptation to a terrestrial lifestyle. Rather, it had a high degree of joint mobility and suspensory ability similar to those found in Ateles and Brachyteles.

== Paleobiology ==
Due to its anatomy, Cartelles is believed to have been frugivorous and well adapted to climbing and practicing suspensory locomotion on trees. Despite previous speculation of terrestriality on the basis of its large size, it had no apparent adaptation to life on the ground. However, it cannot be completely excluded that it or other similarly large monkeys descended from the trees occasionally. The climate in Toca da Boa Vista was drier than the areas today inhabited by their modern relatives, who remain on the trees partly to avoid flooded terrain. Nevertheless, the presence of such large arboreal monkeys in Bahia suggests that the region may have supported a dense forest during the Late Pleistocene.

== Temporal range ==
Samples taken at the Toca da Boa Vista caves range from about 360,000 to 10,000 years ago during the Pleistocene, with a cluster of dates between 15,000 and 20,000 years ago near the end of the period. A more precise date cannot be established for the Cartelles remains, as these samples were not taken in its exact locality.

== See also ==
- List of fossil primates of South America
