= Solimoea =

Solimoea Temporal range: Late Miocene (Mayoan-Huayquerian) ~11.608–7.246 Ma

Scientific classification
- Kingdom: Animalia
- Phylum: Chordata
- Class: Mammalia
- Order: Primates
- Suborder: Haplorhini
- Family: Atelidae
- Subfamily: Atelinae
- Genus: †Solimoea; Kay, 2006
- Species: †S. acrensis

Binomial name
- †Solimoea acrensis Kay, 2006

Extinct genus of new world monkeys

Solimoea acrensis is a prehistoric ateline monkey from the Late Miocene Solimões Formation of Brazil. It is the only known species of the genus Solimoea.

== Discovery and naming ==
Despite the abundance of primates in modern-day Amazonia, the fossil record of these animals is rather poor with only few specimens having been described from Miocene South America prior to 2006. During a joint expedition between the Universidade Federal do Acre and the University of Rondônia further primate remains where recovered and later described by Richard Kay and Mario Alberto Cozzuol. These remains include the holotype UFAC-LPP 5177, an isolated lower left first molar, and UFAC-LPP 5178, a maxillary fragment containing the 3rd and 4th premolar. Although they represent different parts of the dentition, they are referred to the same species for a series of reasons. Both specimens were found in the same locality and share certain morphological features including the moderately developed shearing crests. The dimensions of both specimens also match the proportions seen in other atelids.

The name of Solimoea acrensis references both the formation and state the fossils were found in.

== Description ==
The first lower molar is uniquely elongated and narrow for an atelid. The upper premolars possess 3 distinct roots, one lingual and two buccal. The shearing crests of both premolars and molars are moderately developed, which can be used to infer diet.

The body size of Solimoea has been calculated based on the molar occlusal area in comparison with the body weight of female individuals of 15 other platyrrhine species. According to the resulting formula Solimoea may have obtained a weight of around 5.4 kg (12 lb) or up to 8 kg (18 lb). A second formula has also been applied, including data from both catarrhines and platyrrhines, giving an average estimated weight of 6.01 kg (13.2 lb). This puts the animal in a similar size range as the modern woolly monkeys (Lagothrix) and spider monkeys (Ateles). Research comparing several dozen extinct species with a broader representation of extant species shows Solimoea to be within the Atelinae subfamily.

== Phylogeny ==
In the description of Solimoea, Kay and Cozzuol recover the genus as the earliest member of Atelinae, one of the two extant subfamilies of the Atelidae.

- - - Stirtonia tatacoensis
    - - Black Howler
      - - Brown Howler
        - Colombian Red Howler
  - - Solimoea acrensis
    - - Geoffroy's Spider Monkey
      - - Southern Muriqui
        - Common Woolly Monkey

Although originally proposed to be an ateline, a relative of spider monkeys, woolly monkeys and muriquis, a study from 2015 instead suggests that Solimoea may have instead been a member of Alouattinae, the clade composed of the modern howler monkeys. The cladogram by Rosenberger et al. is shown below.

- - - Protopithecus
    - - Paralouatta
      - - Solimoea
        - - - Stirtonia
            - Solimoea
          - - Solimoea
            - Alouatta

== Paleobiology ==
In platyrrhine primates the morphology of the cheek teeth, in particular the development of the shearing crests in relation to molar size, is reflecting of the animal's diet. This relation is expressed in the form of the "shearing quotient". Depending on the diet, the "shearing quotient" in platyrrhines may be in a positive or negative range, with primates feeding on insects, cellulose-rich leaves and other fibrous matter having a better developed shearing crests than those feeding primarily on fruit or tree gum, which possess flatter molars with rounded shearing crests. The "shearing quotient" of Solimoea has been calculated to be around -5%, corresponding with a diet of soft fruit and generally resembling that of the extant Geoffroy's spider monkey (shearing quotient of -4.35%), the most frugivorous of all living atelids.

Solimoea shared its environment with two other primate species, including a species of the stem-howler monkey Stirtonia, previously identified as a procyonid carnivoran by Frailey (1986), and Acrecebus fraileyi, a large bodied genus of Capuchin monkey also described by Kay and Cozzuol.

== See also ==
- List of fossil primates of South America
