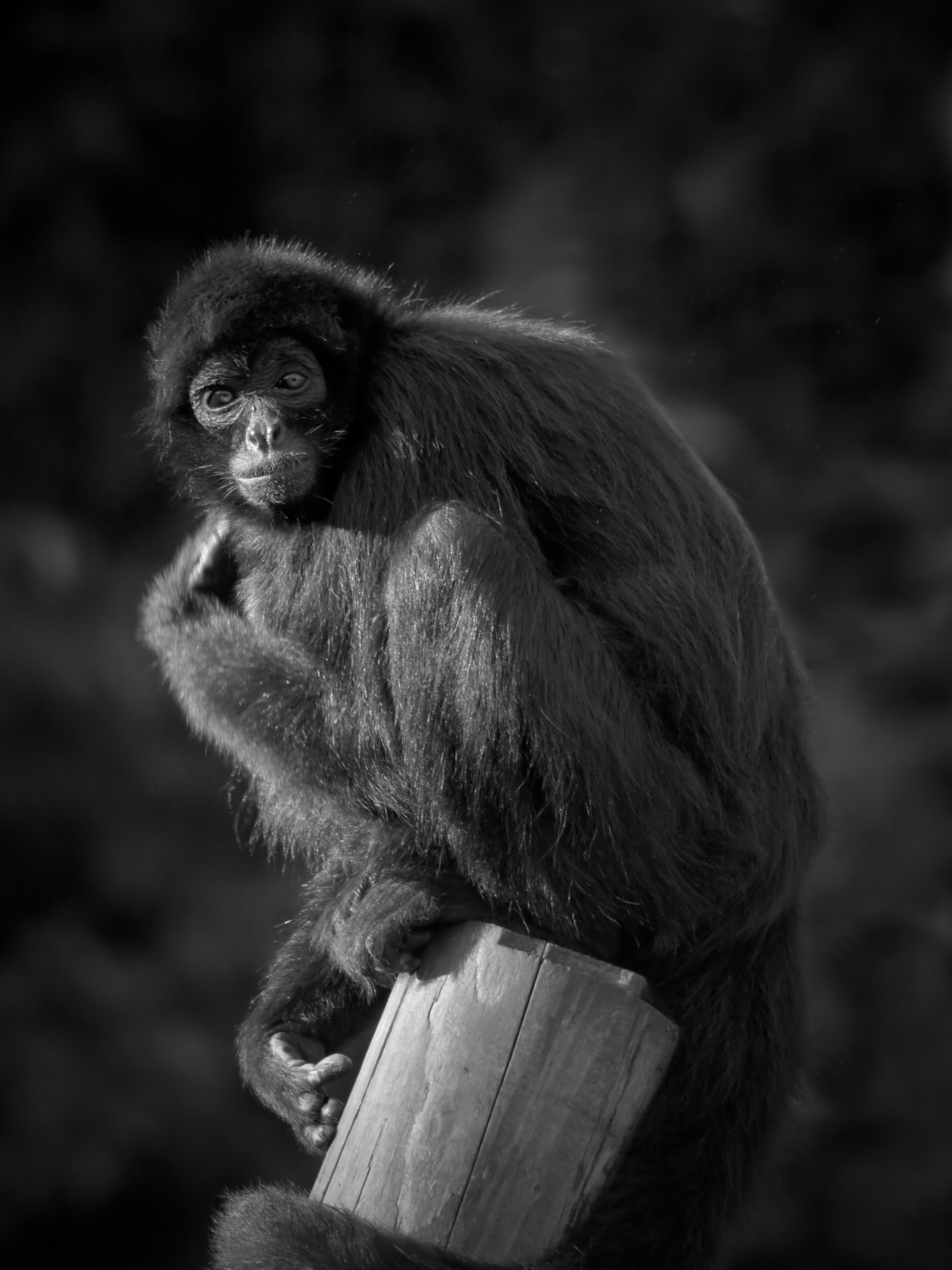

Conservation status
- Vulnerable (IUCN 3.1)

Scientific classification
- Kingdom: Animalia
- Phylum: Chordata
- Class: Mammalia
- Order: Primates
- Family: Atelidae
- Genus: Ateles
- Species: A. fusciceps
- Subspecies: A. f. rufiventris

Trinomial name
- Ateles fusciceps rufiventris (Sclater, 1872)

Synonyms
- dariensis Goldman, 1915; robustus J. A. Allen, 1914

= Colombian spider monkey =

Subspecies of New World monkey

The Colombian spider monkey (Ateles fusciceps rufiventris) is a subspecies of the black-headed spider monkey, a type of New World monkey, found in Colombia and Panama.

The Colombian spider monkey lives in dry forests, humid forests and cloud forests, and can live up to 2,000 to 2,500 metres (6,600 to 8,200 ft) above sea level. This subspecies is entirely black with some white on its chin while the nominate subspecies, the brown-headed spider monkey (A. f. fusciceps), has a black or brown body and a brown head.

The spider monkey has a black body and long limbs with thumb-less hands. It has a prehensile and extremely flexible tail, which acts as an extra limb. The tail has a hairless patch on the tip that is used for grip. This hairless patch is unique in its markings, just like the human fingerprint. The Colombian spider monkey can weigh up to 9.1 kg (20 lb). Fruit makes up eighty percent of the spider monkey's diet, which also includes leaves, nuts, seeds, bark, insects, and flowers. Spider monkeys contribute to the dispersion of undigested seeds from the fruits they eat. This monkey lives approximately 24 years.

Spider monkeys are found in social groups of up to 30 individuals; however, they are usually broken up into smaller foraging groups of 3-4 individuals. They move and climb through the forest by hand over hand (brachiation) motion.

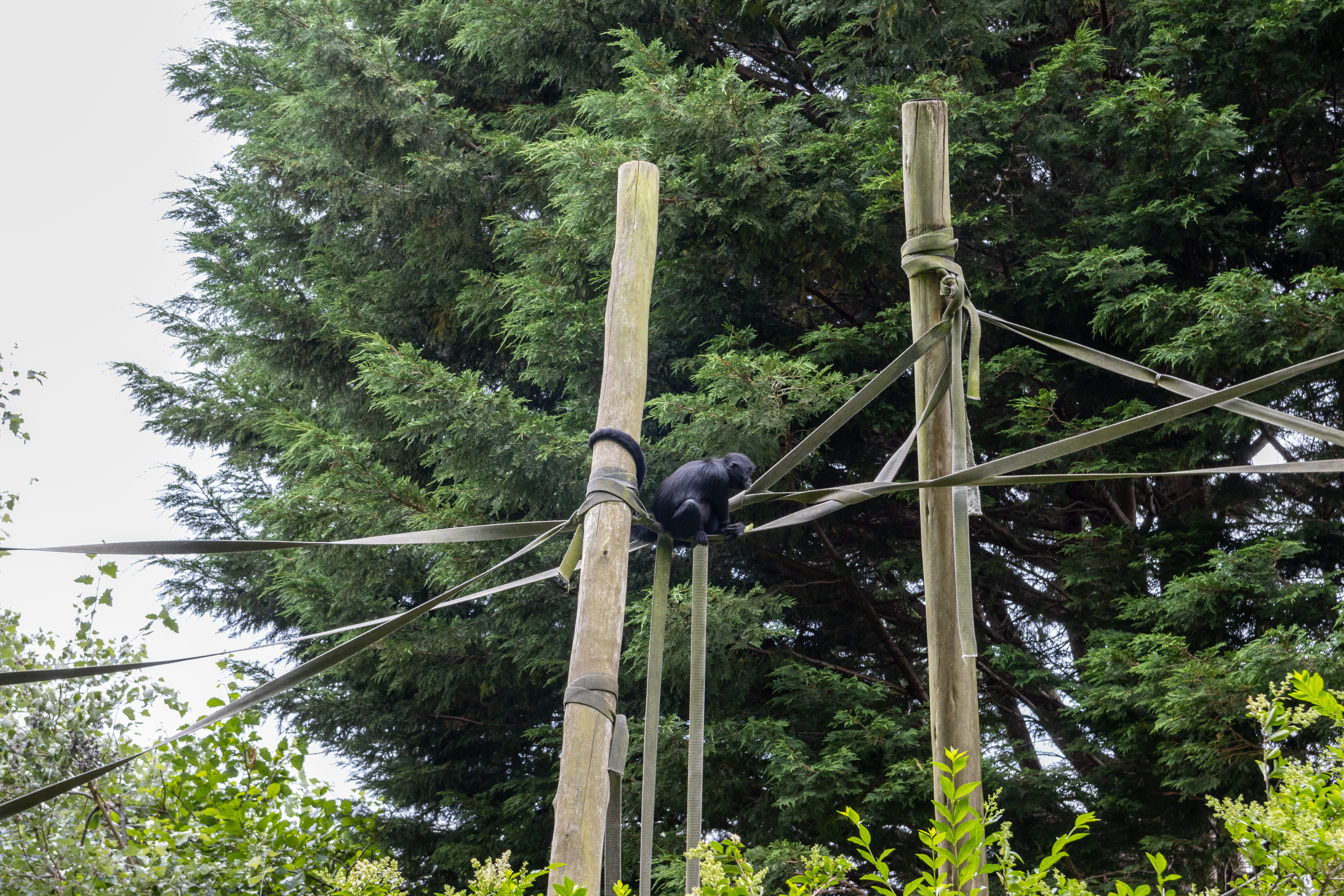
Columbian spider monkey at Chester Zoo
