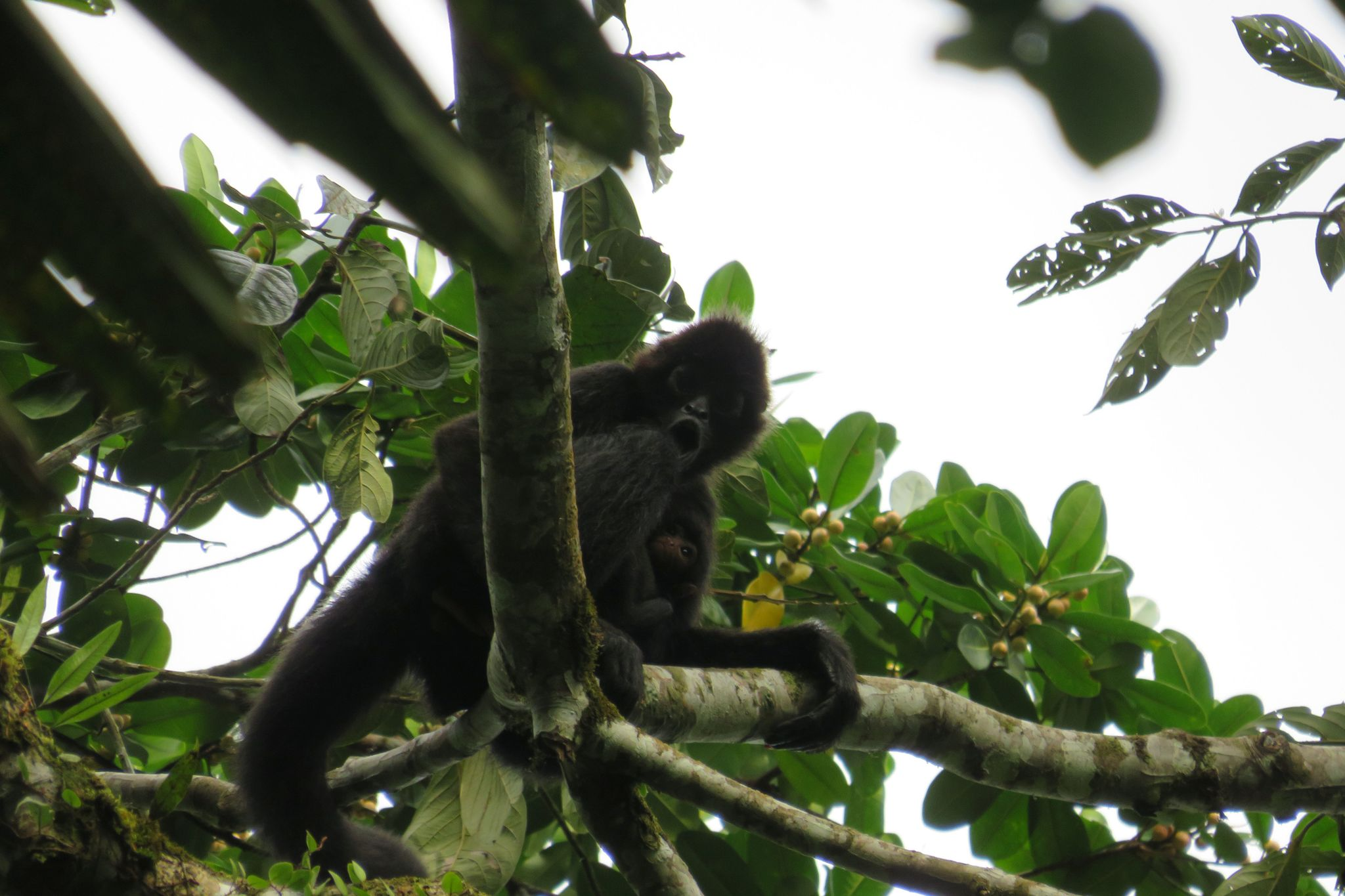
- A. fusciceps fusciceps at Ecuador

Conservation status
- Critically Endangered (IUCN 3.1)

Scientific classification
- Kingdom: Animalia
- Phylum: Chordata
- Class: Mammalia
- Order: Primates
- Suborder: Haplorhini
- Infraorder: Simiiformes
- Family: Atelidae
- Genus: Ateles
- Species: A. fusciceps
- Subspecies: A. f. fusciceps

Trinomial name
- Ateles fusciceps fusciceps (Gray, 1866)

= Brown-headed spider monkey =

Subspecies of New World monkey

The brown-headed spider monkey (Ateles fusciceps fusciceps) is a critically endangered subspecies of the black-headed spider monkey, a type of New World monkey, found in northwestern Ecuador.

Its type locality is at 1500 m in the Hacienda Chinipamba, Imbabura Province in North-West Ecuador. It inhabits areas west of the Andes Mountains. Some authorities, such as Froelich (1991), Collins and Dubach (2001) and Nieves (2005), do not recognize the black-headed spider monkey as a distinct species and so treat the brown-headed spider monkey as a subspecies of Geoffroy's spider monkey.

The brown-headed spider monkey lives in tropical and subtropical humid forests that are between 100 and 1,700 metres (330 and 5,580 ft) above sea level. It lives in population densities of 1.2 monkeys per square kilometer. It has a black or brown body and a brown head, while the Colombian spider monkey (A. f. rufiventris) is entirely black with some white on its chin.

The brown-headed spider monkey is critically endangered as a result of habitat loss, due to deforestation, and hunting.
