= Caipora bambuiorum =

Caipora bambuiorum Temporal range: Late Pleistocene ~0.010 Ma

Scientific classification
- Kingdom: Animalia
- Phylum: Chordata
- Class: Mammalia
- Infraclass: Placentalia
- Order: Primates
- Family: Atelidae
- Subfamily: Atelinae
- Genus: †Caipora; Cartelle & Hartwig, 1996
- Species: †C. bambuiorum

Binomial name
- †Caipora bambuiorum Cartelle & Hartwig, 1996

Extinct species of new world monkey

Caipora is an extinct genus of large New World monkey that lived during the Pleistocene. It contains a single species, Caipora bambuiorum. Fossils have been found only in Brazil's Toca da Boa Vista cave, alongside the larger Cartelles.

== Research history and taxonomy ==
Caipora bambuiorum is known from an almost complete skeleton of a late-stage subadult individual discovered in the Toca da Boa Vista cave in 1992, by the speleological team Grupo Bambuí de Pesquisas Espeleológicas. An almost complete skeleton of Cartelles was found at the same location and assigned to Protopithecus before being recognized as distinct. Caipora and Protopithecus are thought to have been atelines related to muriquis or woolly spider monkeys (genus Brachyteles), while Cartelles was an alouattine related to howler monkeys (Alouatta).

The generic name is taken from Caipora, a humanoid forest spirit in Brazilian folklore, while the specific honors the Grupo Bambuí.

== Description ==
Caipora was a large-bodied monkey: despite the subadult age of the type specimen, its postcranial skeleton is more robust than any living New World monkey, but not as robust as Protopithecus and Cartelles, and the individual is estimated to have weighed around 20.5 kilograms. Its upper limbs are very long, and the neurocranium is more rounded than is typical in New World monkeys.

== Paleoecology ==
Like the extant genera Ateles and Brachyteles, Caipora may have been a specialised suspensory climber and clamberer.

The presence of large arboreal monkeys in Bahia suggests that the region may have supported a dense forest during the Late Pleistocene.

== See also ==
- List of fossil primates of South America
