= Protopithecus =

Protopithecus Temporal range: Late Pleistocene (Ensenadan-Lujanian) ~0.126–0.012 Ma

Scientific classification
- Kingdom: Animalia
- Phylum: Chordata
- Class: Mammalia
- Order: Primates
- Family: Atelidae
- Subfamily: Atelinae
- Genus: †Protopithecus; Lund, 1838

Type species
- †Protopithecus brasiliensis Lund, 1838

Extinct genus of new world monkeys

Protopithecus is an extinct genus of large New World monkey that lived during the Pleistocene. Fossils were found in Lagoa Santa, Minas Gerais, Brazil in the 19th century. Other remains once assigned to this genus from Buenos Aires Province, Argentina and Toca da Boa Vista, Brazil likely belong to other taxa such as Cartelles.

== Research history ==
In July 1836, a left proximal femur (UZM 1623) and a right distal humerus (UZM 3530) of a large primate were collected by Danish paleontologist Peter Wilhelm Lund, commonly hailed as the founder of Brazilian paleontology, from the limestone cave of Lapo de Periperi. Lapo de Periperi is part of the cave networks of Lagoa Santa, Minas Gerais that bear many fossils dating from the Late Pleistocene to the Early Holocene. The humerus and femur were both found in the same cavern but not together, although they are believed to be from the same individual. These two fragmentary fossils were formally described and published in a Danish journal in 1838. The species was named Protopithecus brasiliensis, and was the first of four fossil primates that Lund named from Lagoa Santa fossils.

Lund recognized that the animal was a platyrrhine monkey, despite its large size. The description was republished in other European journals through 1839 and 1840, and was mentioned in Charles Darwin’s On the Origin of Species. The original description of Protopithecus was brief, but a monograph by Herluf Winge in 1895 expanded it and allocated a cervical vertebra, caudal vertebra, proximal phalanx, middle phalanx, and a metatarsal. The assignment of these fossils is dubious, as they are from smaller individuals and different caverns. Winge also placed P. brasiliensis in the genus Eriodes (now included in Brachyteles), based on his belief that the fossils were indistinguishable from those of existing spider monkeys except for their size. Due to this, the fossils mostly faded into obscurity for over a century. A second species of Protopithecus, P. bonariensis, was erected for isolated incisors collected from deposits further south in Buenos Aires Province, Argentina. The species was described by French paleontologist Paul Gervais and Argentine paleontologist Florentino Ameghino, but the fossils were not catalogued, illustrated, or described in detail, making this species a nomen nudum. Doubts over whether the fossils belonged to Protopithecus have been raised.

The history of Protopithecus was upended in 1992 when two nearly complete skeletons of large platyrrhines were discovered in the Toca da Boa Vista caves in the adjacent state of Bahia, Brazil also dating to the Late Pleistocene. The fossils included the skull, mandible, and teeth. These too were identified as Brachyteles and similar to B. (Protopithecus) brasiliensis in a brief announcement of the discovery by paleontologist Cástor Cartelle in 1993. One of the two skeletons was later described as a subadult individual belonging to a new genus and species, Caipora bambuiorum, identified in 1996 as a giant spider monkey of the subfamily Atelinae. The other skeleton was identified as a specimen of Protopithecus brasiliensis, and the genus Protopithecus was restored as valid. The skeleton was made into a hypodigm of the species in 1995, but only on the basis of size and long bone morphology. The Toca da Boa Vista skeleton was used as the basis for future studies of the species’ paleobiology, anatomy, and more instead of the holotype due to its more complete nature. However, a 2013 study of the Toca da Boa Vista found that it had distinct humeral and femoral morphology from the holotype and belonged to a different genus and species, named Cartelles coimbrafilhoi. Cartelles was even larger and more robust than Protopithecus or Caipora, and unlike them, it was more related to howler monkeys than spider monkeys. This led to most of the material assigned to Protopithecus to be moved to Cartelles except for the holotype. Since then, Protopithecus has received little attention.

== Paleoecology ==
The environment inhabited by Protopithecus is unclear. Most of Brazil was thought to have been covered in open tropical cerrado vegetation during the Late Pleistocene, but if Protopithecus and Caipora were arboreal, their presence would suggest that the region supported a dense closed forest during the Late Pleistocene. It is possible that the region alternated between dry open savannah and closed wet forest throughout the climate change of the Late Pleistocene.

== See also ==
- List of fossil primates of South America
