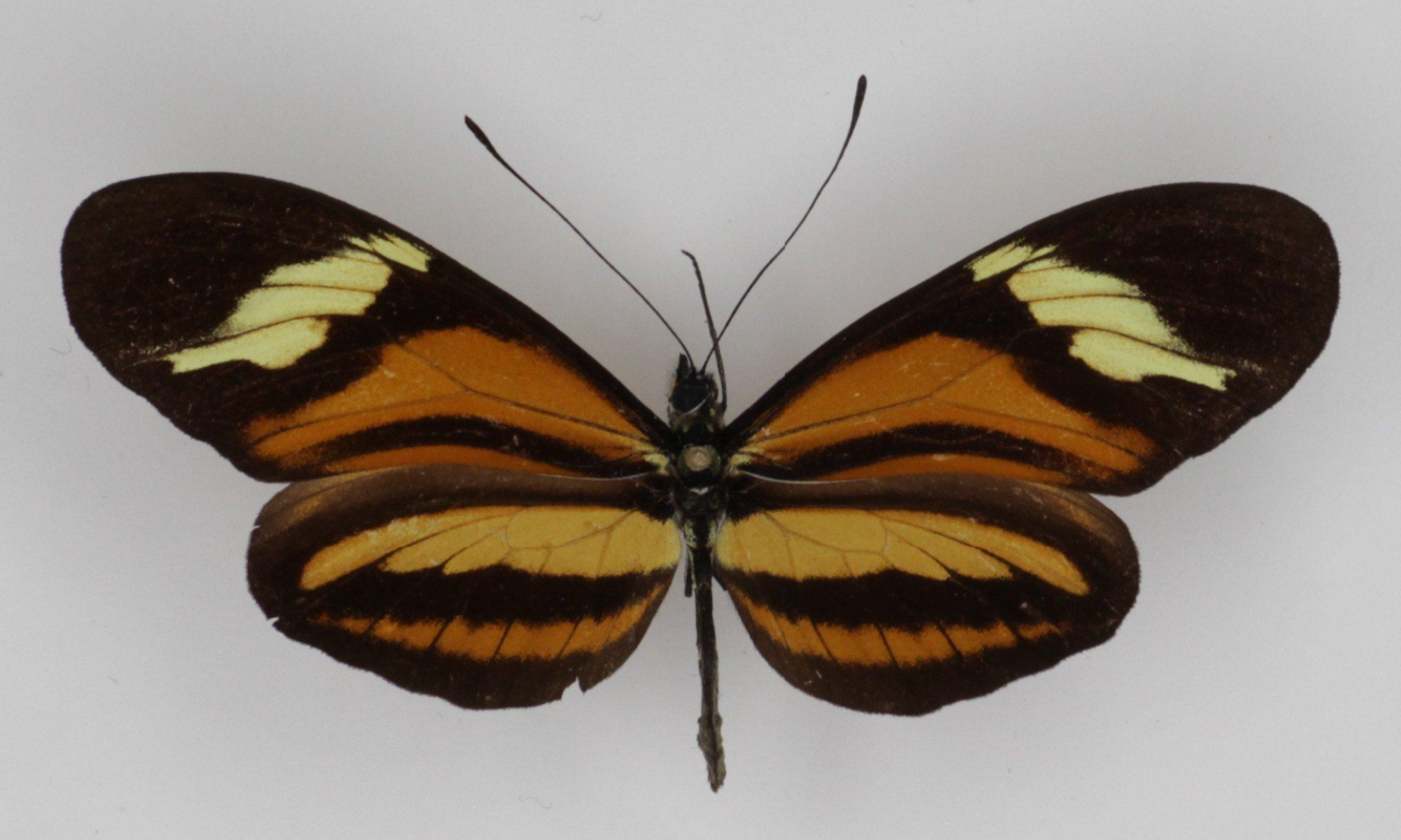

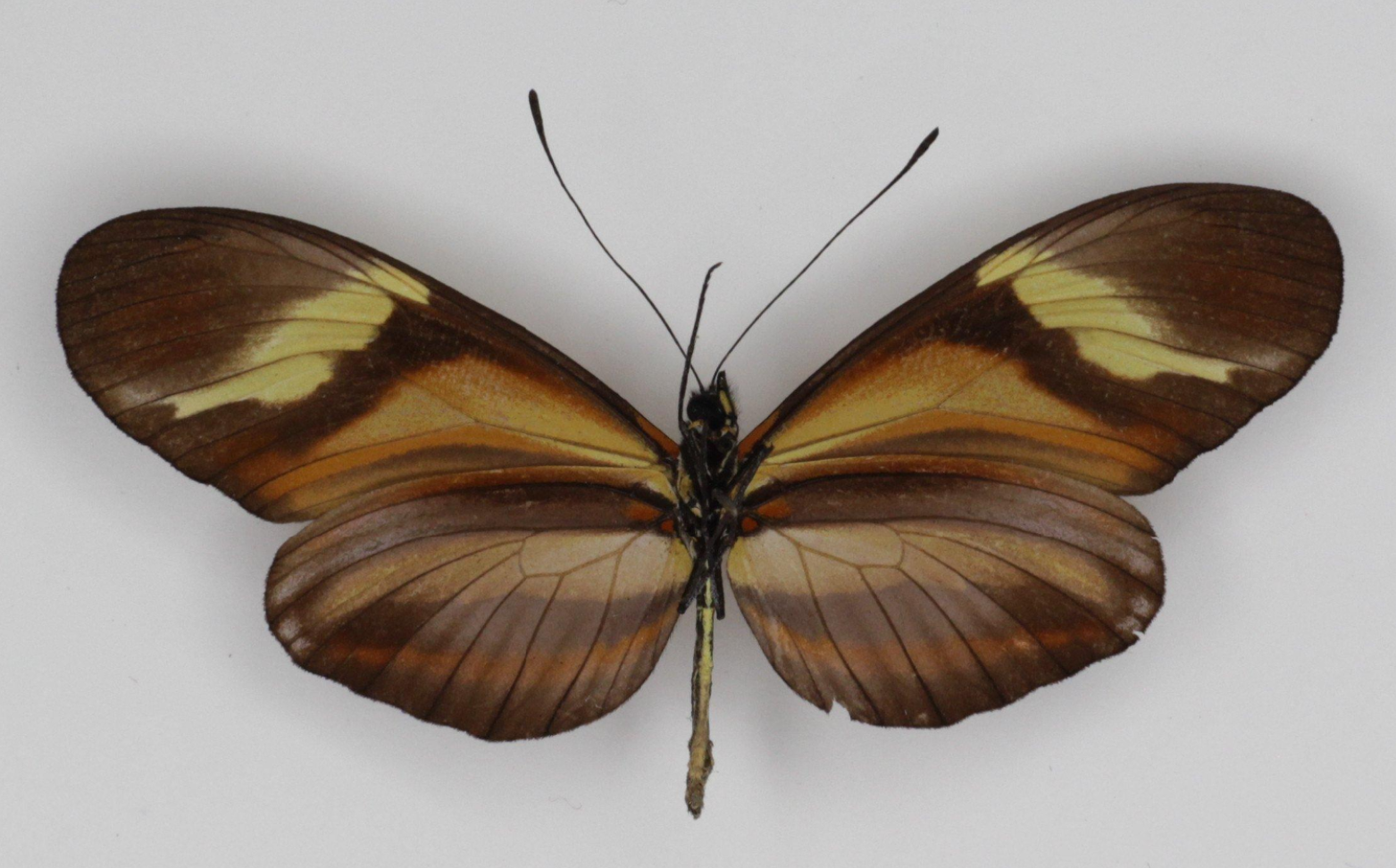

Conservation status
- Critically Endangered (IUCN 2.3)

Scientific classification
- Kingdom: Animalia
- Phylum: Arthropoda
- Class: Insecta
- Order: Lepidoptera
- Family: Nymphalidae
- Genus: Heliconius
- Species: H. nattereri

Binomial name
- Heliconius nattereri C. & R. Felder, 1865

Synonyms
- Heliconius fruhstorferi Riffarth, 1899

= Heliconius nattereri =

Natterer's longwing

Species of butterfly

Heliconius nattereri (Natterer's longwing) is a species of butterfly in the family Nymphalidae. It is endemic to the Atlantic forest of Brazil.

The butterfly has been found in the Feliciano Miguel Abdala Private Natural Heritage Reserve in the state of Minas Gerais.

The wings of the female H. nattereri are black, orange, and yellow in color, while the male wings are a black and yellow pattern. Males tend to fly faster and congregate in the canopy, while females fly slower and stay in the middle story.

The H. nattereri species is currently listed as endangered. This is due to their unique habitat which is currently being invaded by humans and activities such as deforestation.
