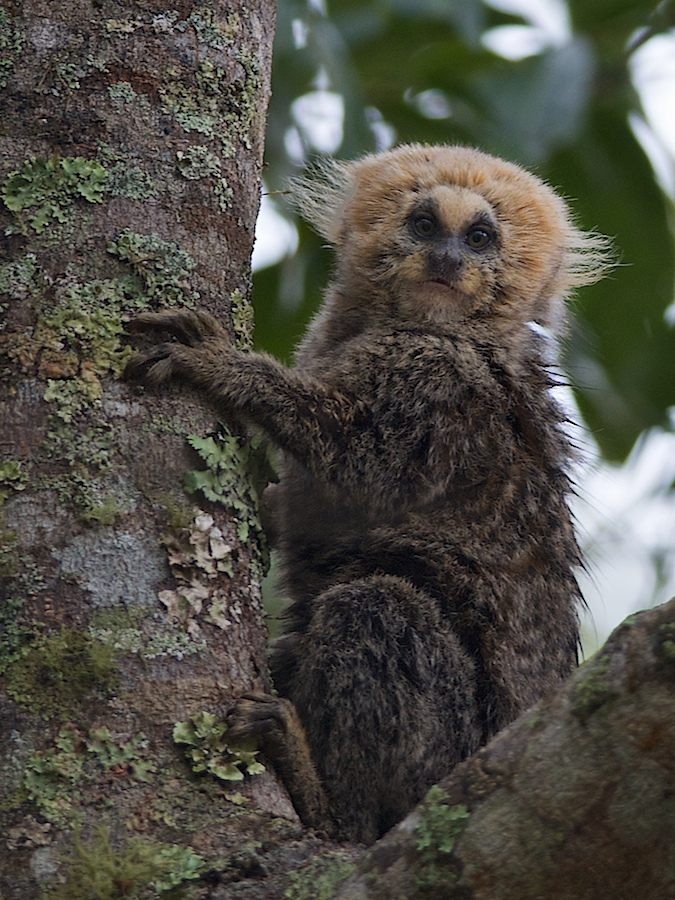

Conservation status
- Critically Endangered (IUCN 3.1)
- CITES Appendix I

Scientific classification
- Kingdom: Animalia
- Phylum: Chordata
- Class: Mammalia
- Infraclass: Placentalia
- Order: Primates
- Family: Callitrichidae
- Genus: Callithrix
- Species: C. flaviceps

Binomial name
- Callithrix flaviceps (Thomas, 1903)
- Geographic range

Synonyms
- flavescente Miranda Ribeiro, 1924

= Buffy-headed marmoset =

Species of New World monkey

The buffy-headed marmoset (Callithrix flaviceps) is a rare species of marmoset endemic to the rainforests of south-eastern Brazil. It occurs in southern Espírito Santo and possibly northern Rio de Janeiro and its distribution extends into Minas Gerais.

== Description ==
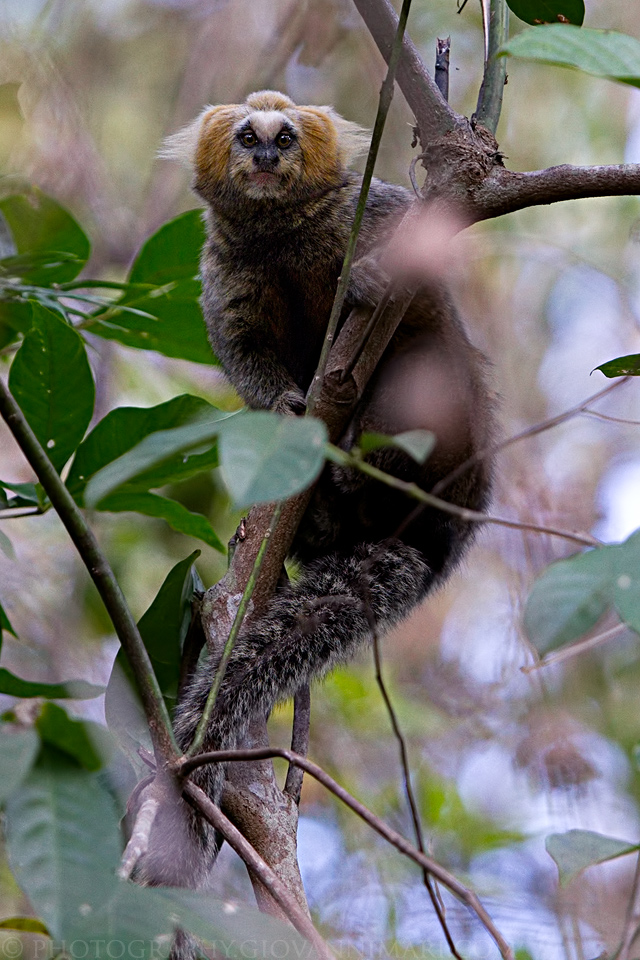
Buffy-headed marmoset in Feliciano Miguel Abdala Reserve, Brazil.

The average weight of an adult buffy-headed marmoset can range in weight anywhere between 119g to 710g. These marmosets have a low metabolic rate, as well as an enlarged cecum that allows consumption of food that is high in fiber.

== Ecology and behavior ==
Due to their small size, buffy-headed marmosets are susceptible to a wide range of predators. Common threats include ocelots, green anacondas, and hawks, but many other animals such as toucans prey on them. The buffy-headed marmoset has four distinct patterns of predator avoidance. Primarily, buffy-headed marmosets avoid aerial predators through low-intensity alarm signals, emitting soft, closed-mouth whistles to warn other group members. A secondary behavior in dealing with aerial threats is a high-intensity alarm. These marmosets will send out a half-mouthed, open whistle to alert other members to take cover under branches or trees, sometimes immediately ceasing movement for the purpose of avoiding exposure. This pattern of avoidance is instinctive, and at times can result in these primates leaping downward from canopy to canopy in 10m jumps.

The third type of anti-predator alarm is for low-intensity terrestrial threats. A few marmosets in the group will give a call to the rest, alerting them of a possible threat such as a snake. The buffy-headed marmosets then proceed to "mob" the predator by amassing in large groups, thus giving an incentive for the predator to not attack. Low calls, often made with the intention of frightening the predator, are a technique that is surprisingly effective. When dealing with threats such as raccoons, they will do so, but maintain their distance from 15–20 m away. The last reaction is one for high-intensity terrestrial situations. In instances of dealing with larger or more threatening predators, such as the tayra, the buffy-headed marmosets amass in a large group, yelping in piercingly loud manner to try and scare the predator away.

Distinct vocalizations are used depending on whether they are for inter-group communication of extra-group communication. For inter-group communication, a short-distance call is used, while for an extra-group communication call, a loud, shrill long-distance call is used. Specific vocalizations are used when an adult buffy-headed marmoset discovers a source of food with others. Younger ones respond by running towards the calling marmoset, while expressing vocalizations of excitement. The dominant female will sometimes also express these vocalizations of excitement. If the food is not given, the female and younger marmosets will stay near the adult buffy-headed marmoset while conveying short vocalizations, to display their presence and express a need for food.

=== Diet ===
The buffy-headed marmoset is known primarily for eating fruits, gum, and plant exudates. A small portion of their diet is composed of bird eggs and nestlings. While most marmosets are known for being gumnivorous, the buffy-headed marmoset is predominantly mycophagous-insectivorous. Additionally, they may prey on both vertebrates and invertebrates: primarily orthopterans, phasmids, coleopterans, caterpillars, and tree frogs.

==== Fungi ====
Often found at the base of bamboo, fungi are also known to be included in the diet of buffy-headed-marmosets. Because this group of marmosets primarily inhabits areas in which fungi are abundant, it tends to be a consistent source of sustenance throughout the year. Fruits and exudates vary seasonally, and thus are not as readily available, nor as frequently consumed. Fungi, when present, are typically preferred by the buffy-headed marmosets, and likely more nutritious by comparison to their other dietary components.

== See also ==
- Feliciano Miguel Abdala Private Natural Heritage Reserve
