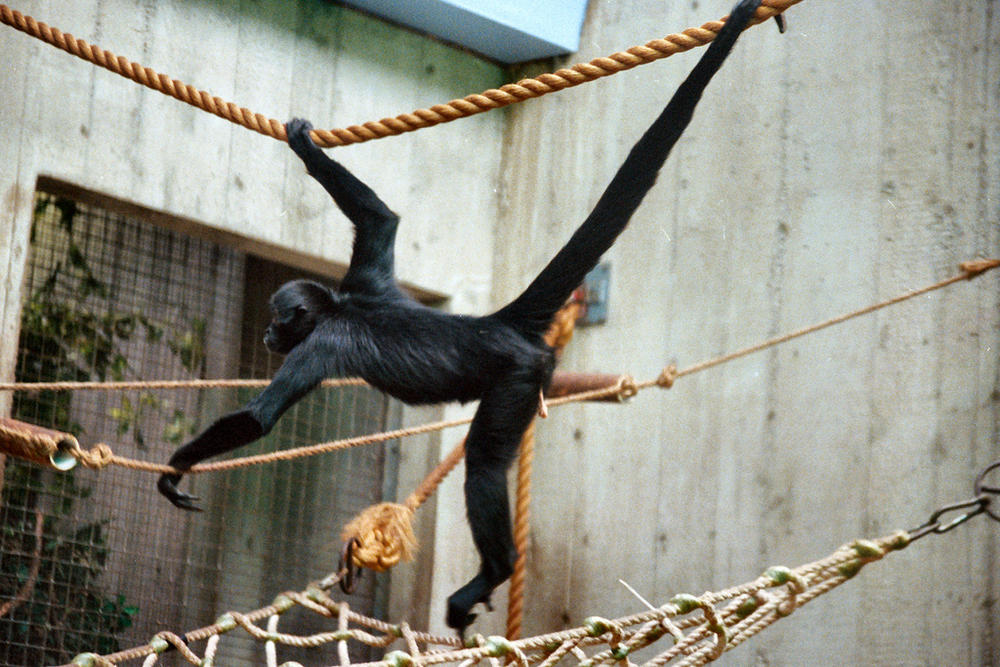
- Black-headed spider monkey (Ateles fusciceps)

Scientific classification
- Kingdom: Animalia
- Phylum: Chordata
- Class: Mammalia
- Infraclass: Placentalia
- Order: Primates
- Family: Atelidae
- Subfamily: Atelinae; Gray, 1825

Genera
- Ateles; Brachyteles †Caipora; Lagothrix †Protopithecus †Solimoea †Stirtonia

= Atelinae =

Atelinae Temporal range: Middle Miocene to present

Subfamily of New World monkeys

The Atelinae are a subfamily of New World monkeys in the family Atelidae, and includes the various spider and woolly monkeys. The primary distinguishing feature of the atelines is their long prehensile tails, which can support their entire body weight.

Atelines live on the American continent from southern Mexico through central Brazil and Bolivia. Diurnal and arboreal, they move speedily and acrobatically through the trees using their tails. Atelines, along with the related howler monkeys, are the largest of the New World monkeys. They live in groups, show amicable intergroup relations, and can coalesce into large aggregations for extended periods of time.

Atelines are frugivore-folivores, their diet consisting primarily of fruits, seeds and leaves, with Ateles being the most frugivorous, fruits comprising over 80% of their diet. Those species relying most heavily on patchily distributed fruit trees have the largest ranges. These animals are characterized by a slow reproduction rate: females only bear young once every two to four years. Many species are hunted for their meat, and the destruction of their habitat likewise endangers them; the spider monkey already stands at the edge of extermination.

== Classification ==
=== Extant taxa ===
- Family Atelidae: howler, spider and woolly monkeys
  - Subfamily Alouattinae
  - Subfamily Atelinae
    - Genus Ateles: spider monkeys
    - Genus Brachyteles: muriquis (woolly spider monkeys)
    - Genus Lagothrix: woolly monkeys

=== Prehistoric taxa ===
- Subfamily Atelinae
  - Genus Stirtonia
    - Stirtonia tatacoensis
    - Stirtonia victoriae
  - Genus Protopithecus
    - Protopithecus brasiliensis
  - Genus Caipora
    - Caipora bambuiorum
  - Genus Solimoea
    - Solimoea acrensis
