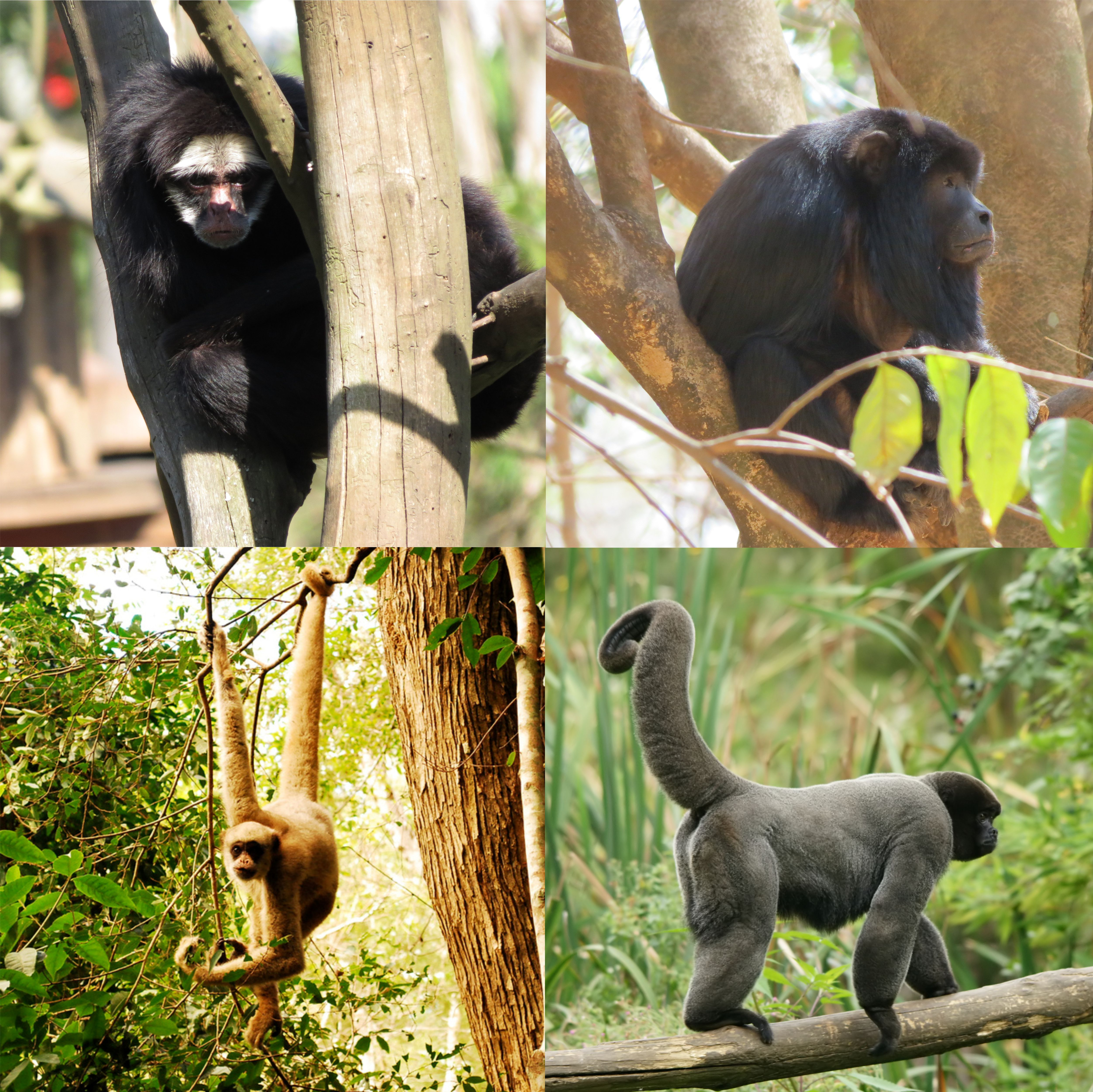
- The four extant atelid genera, from left to right: Ateles (spider monkey), Alouatta (howler monkey), Brachyteles (muriqui), Lagothrix (woolly monkey).

Scientific classification
- Kingdom: Animalia
- Phylum: Chordata
- Class: Mammalia
- Order: Primates
- Parvorder: Platyrrhini
- Family: Atelidae; Gray, 1825

Type genus
- Ateles E. Geoffroy, 1806

Genera
- Alouatta; Ateles; Brachyteles; Lagothrix

= Atelidae =

Atelidae Temporal range: Middle Miocene to present

Family of New World monkeys

The Atelidae are one of the five families of New World monkeys now recognised. It was formerly included in the family Cebidae. Atelids are generally larger monkeys; the family includes the howler, spider, woolly, and woolly spider monkeys (the latter being the largest of the New World monkeys). They are found throughout the forested regions of Central and South America, from Mexico to northern Argentina.

== Characteristics ==
The Atelidae family consists of monkeys that are small to moderate in size, usually 34 to 72 cm in head-body length, with the howler monkeys being the largest members of the group, and the spider monkeys being the smallest. They have long prehensile tails with a sensitive, almost hairless, tactile pad on the underside of the distal part. The tail is frequently used as 'fifth limb' while moving through the trees where they make their homes. They also have nails on their fingers and toes, enabling them to climb. Most species have predominantly dark brown, grey, or black fur, often with paler markings.

These are arboreal and diurnal animals, with most species restricted to dense rain forest, although some howler monkey species are found in drier forests, or wooded savannah. They mainly eat fruit and leaves, although the smaller species, in particular, may also eat some small insects. They have the dental formula: 2.1.3.32.1.3.3

Females give birth to a single infant (or, rarely, twins) after a gestation period of 180 to 225 days. In most species, individuals give birth every one to three years, and there is little, if any, seasonal peak in the number of births.

Atelid monkeys are typically polygamous, and live in social groups with anything up to twenty five adults, depending on species. Where groups are relatively small, as is common amongst the howler monkeys, a single male monopolises a 'harem' of females, but larger groups will contain several males, with a clear hierarchy of dominance.

== Classification ==
Currently, 26 species of extant atelid monkey are recognized, grouped into four genera, and two subfamilies. In addition, a number of extinct species from the fossil record have been identified as being within or closely related to this family.

Family Atelidae

- Subfamily Alouattinae
  - Genus Alouatta, howler monkeys
    - Alouatta palliata group
      - Coiba Island howler, Alouatta coibensis
      - Mantled howler, Alouatta palliata
      - Guatemalan black howler, Alouatta pigra
    - Alouatta seniculus group
      - Ursine howler, Alouatta arctoidea
      - Red-handed howler, Alouatta belzebul
      - Spix's red-handed howler, Alouatta discolor
      - Brown howler, Alouatta guariba
      - Juruá red howler, Alouatta juara
      - Guyanan red howler, Alouatta macconnelli
      - Amazon black howler, Alouatta nigerrima
      - Purus red howler, Alouatta puruensis
      - Bolivian red howler, Alouatta sara
      - Venezuelan red howler, Alouatta seniculus
      - Maranhão red-handed howler, Alouatta ululata
    - Alouatta caraya group
      - Black howler, Alouatta caraya
    - Incertae sedis
      - †Alouatta mauroi (Late Pleistocene)
  - Genus †Cartelles
    - †Cartelles coimbrafilhoi (Late Pleistocene)
  - Genus †Paralouatta, Cuban monkeys
    - †Paralouatta varonai
    - †Paralouatta marianae
  - Genus †Stirtonia
    - †Stirtonia tatacoensis
    - †Stirtonia victoriae
- Subfamily Atelinae
  - Genus Ateles, spider monkeys
    - Red-faced spider monkey, Ateles paniscus
    - White-fronted spider monkey, Ateles belzebuth
    - Peruvian spider monkey, Ateles chamek
    - Brown spider monkey, Ateles hybridus
    - White-cheeked spider monkey, Ateles marginatus
    - Black-headed spider monkey, Ateles fusciceps
    - Geoffroy's spider monkey, Ateles geoffroyi
  - Genus Brachyteles, muriquis (woolly spider monkeys)
    - Southern muriqui, Brachyteles arachnoides
    - Northern muriqui, Brachyteles hypoxanthus
  - Genus Lagothrix, woolly monkeys
    - Common woolly monkey, Lagothrix lagotricha
    - Yellow-tailed woolly monkey, Lagothrix flavicauda
  - Genus †Caipora
    - †Caipora bambuiorum (Late Pleistocene)
  - Genus †Parabrachyteles
    - †Parabrachyteles vesperus (Late Miocene)
  - Genus †Protopithecus
    - †Protopithecus brasiliensis (Late Pleistocene)
  - Genus †Solimoea
    - †Solimoea acrensis (Late Miocene)
- Subfamily Incertae sedis
  - Genus †Chilecebus
    - †Chilecebus carrascoensis (Early Miocene)
  - Genus †Mohanamico
    - †Mohanamico hershkovitzi (Middle Miocene)

Silvestro etal 2017 showed the relationship among the extinct and extant atelid genera:

- stem Atelidae
  - †Mohanamico
  - - †Chilecebus
    - Atelidae
      - stem Atelinae
        - †Solimoea
        - Atelinae
          - - †Caipora
            - - Lagothrix
              - Brachyteles
          - Ateles
      - stem Alouattinae
        - †Stirtonia
        - - †Paralouatta
          - - †Cartelles
            - Alouatta
