= Tactile pad =

Area of skin particularly sensitive to pressure, temperature, or pain

A tactile pad is an area of skin that is particularly sensitive to pressure, temperature, or pain. Tactile pads are characterized by high concentrations of free nerve endings. In primates, the last phalanges in the fingers and toes have tactile pads, allowing very accurate manipulation of objects. This precision grip was an important evolutionary advance in primates.
