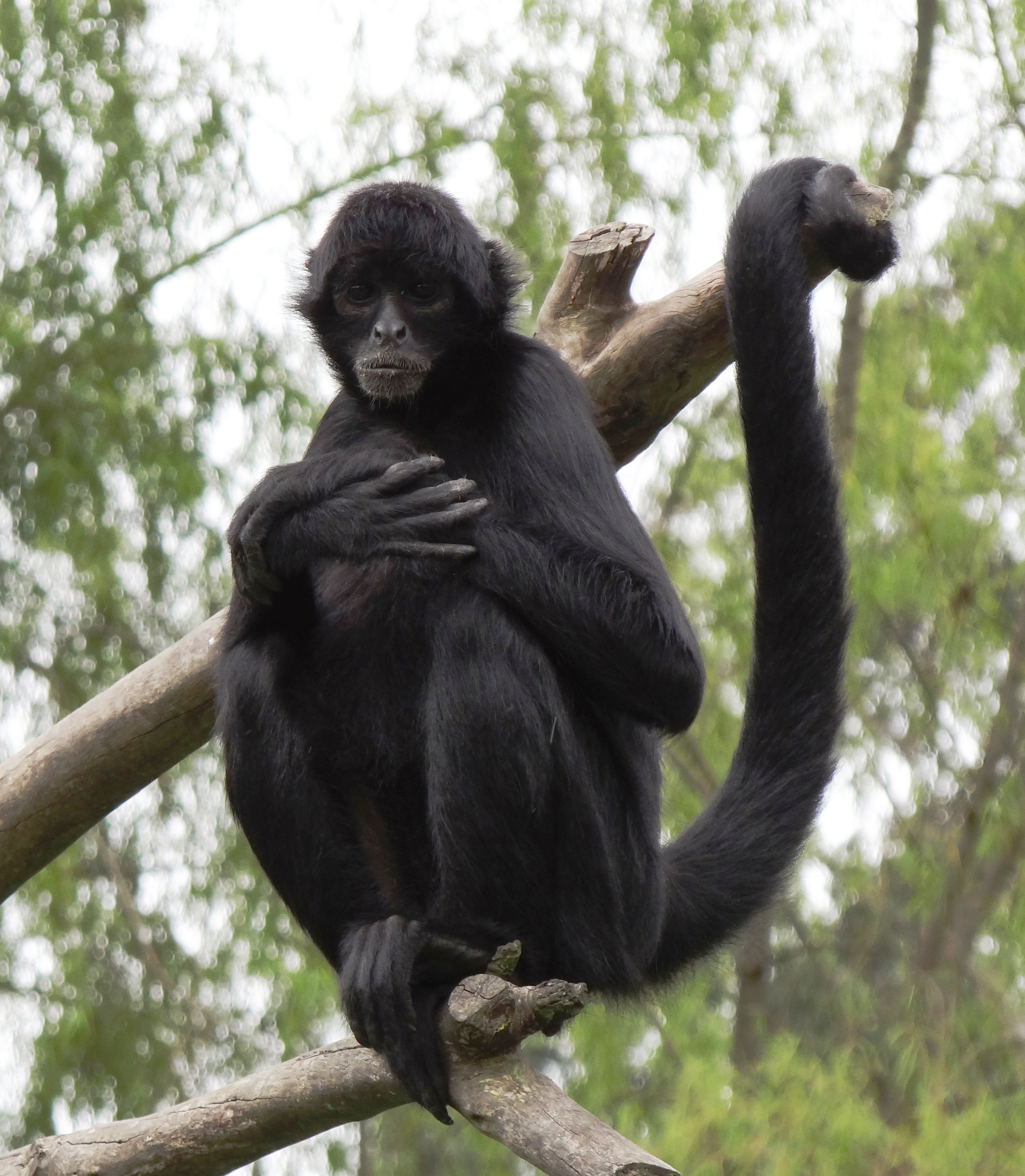
- Colombian spider monkey at Jaime Duque Park, Cundinamarca, Colombia

Conservation status
- Endangered (IUCN 3.1)

Scientific classification
- Kingdom: Animalia
- Phylum: Chordata
- Class: Mammalia
- Infraclass: Placentalia
- Order: Primates
- Family: Atelidae
- Genus: Ateles
- Species: A. fusciceps

Binomial name
- Ateles fusciceps J. E. Gray, 1866
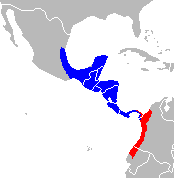
- Distribution of A. geoffroyi (blue) and A. fusciceps (red)

= Black-headed spider monkey =

Endangered species of New World monkey

The black-headed spider monkey (Ateles fusciceps) is a species of spider monkey from Central and South America, specifically Colombia, Ecuador, and Panama. Although primatologists such as Colin Groves (1989) follow Kellogg and Goldman (1944) in treating A. fusciceps as a separate species, other authors, including Froelich (1991), Collins and Dubach (2001) and Nieves (2005) treat it as a subspecies of Geoffroy's spider monkey.

The two subspecies are:

- Ateles fusciceps fusciceps – northwestern Ecuador.
- Ateles fusciceps rufiventris – southwest Colombia to eastern Panama.

== Habitat ==
A. f. fusciceps lives in tropical and subtropical humid forests between 100 and 1,700 metres (330 and 5,580 ft) above sea level. It lives in population densities of 1.2 monkeys per square kilometer. A. f. rufiventris lives in dry forests, humid forests and cloud forests, and can live up to 2,000 to 2,500 metres (6,600 to 8,200 ft) above sea level.

== Description ==
A. f. fusciceps has a black or brown body and a brown head. A. f. rufiventris is entirely black with some white on its chin. The black-headed spider monkey is one of the larger New World monkeys. The head and body length, excluding tail, typically ranges between 39.3 and 53.8 cm (15.5 and 21.2 in). The prehensile tail is between 71.0 and 85.5 cm (28.0 and 33.7 in). On average, males weigh 8.89 kilograms (19.6 lb) and females weigh 8.8 kilograms (19 lb). Its brain weighs 114.7 g (4.05 oz).

== Diet ==
The Black spider monkey is primarily frugivorous, with the consumption of fruit consisting of about 80% of their diet. The remainder of its diet is omnivorous and consists of leaves, nuts, seeds, bark, insects, and flowers.

== Behavior ==
The black-headed spider monkey is arboreal and diurnal. The species is highly sociable, living in social groups with up to 20 individuals but travels in smaller groupings. Most travel is done by brachiating and climbing through woodland areas.

== Reproduction ==
When mating, females may consort with a male for up to three days, or else mate with several males. Mating occurs with the male and female face to face, and can last for five to 10 minutes. The gestation period is between 226 and 232 days. The infant rides on its mother's back for 16 weeks, and is weaned at 20 months. Females attain sexual maturity at 51 months; males at 56 months. Females give birth every three years.

The black-headed spider monkey is considered to be endangered by the International Union for Conservation of Nature (IUCN) due to an estimated population loss of more than 50% over 45 years (2018–2063), from hunting and human encroachment on its range of habitation.

Captive black-headed spider monkeys have been known to live more than 24 years.

== Gallery ==
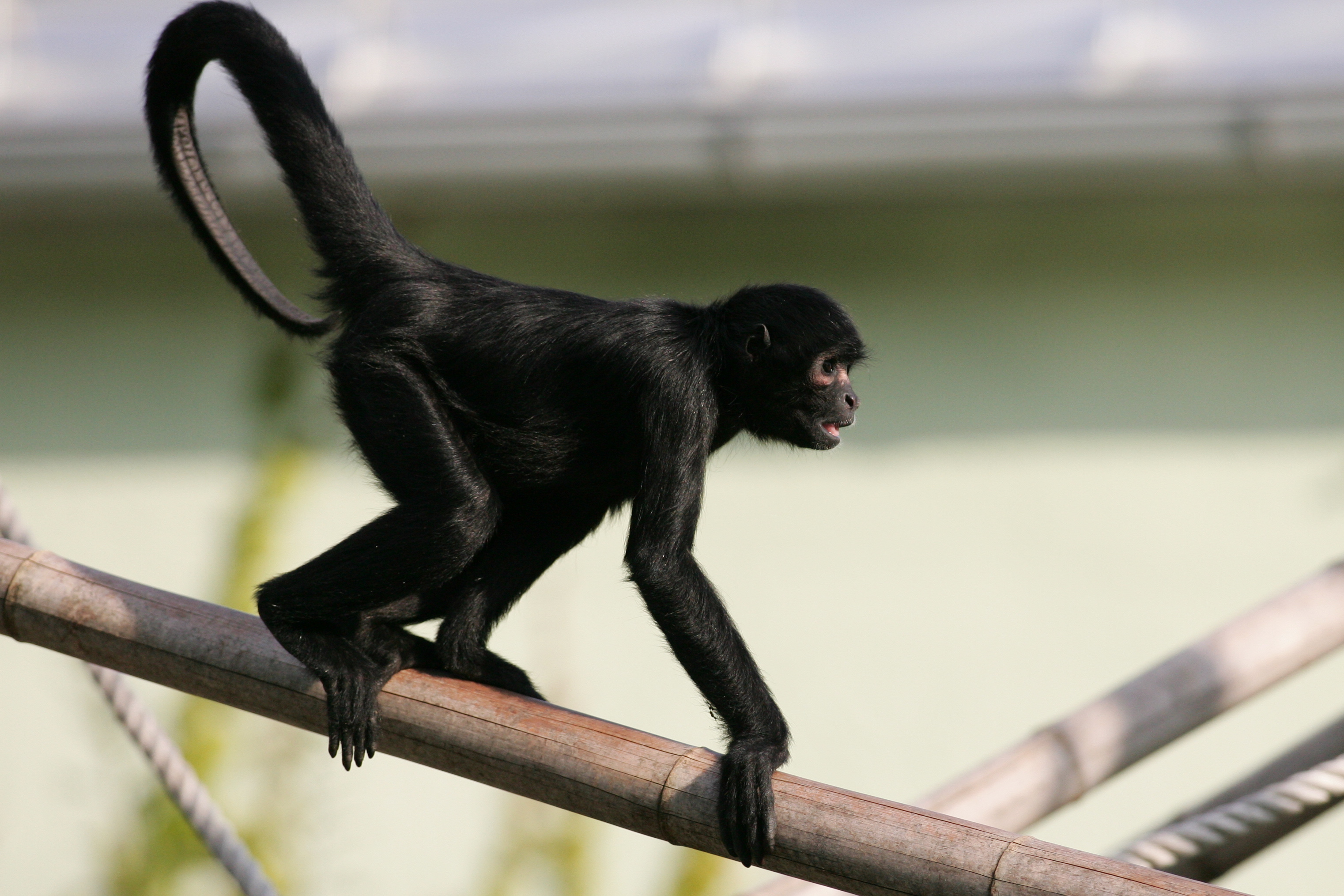
Ateles fusciceps rufiventris moving

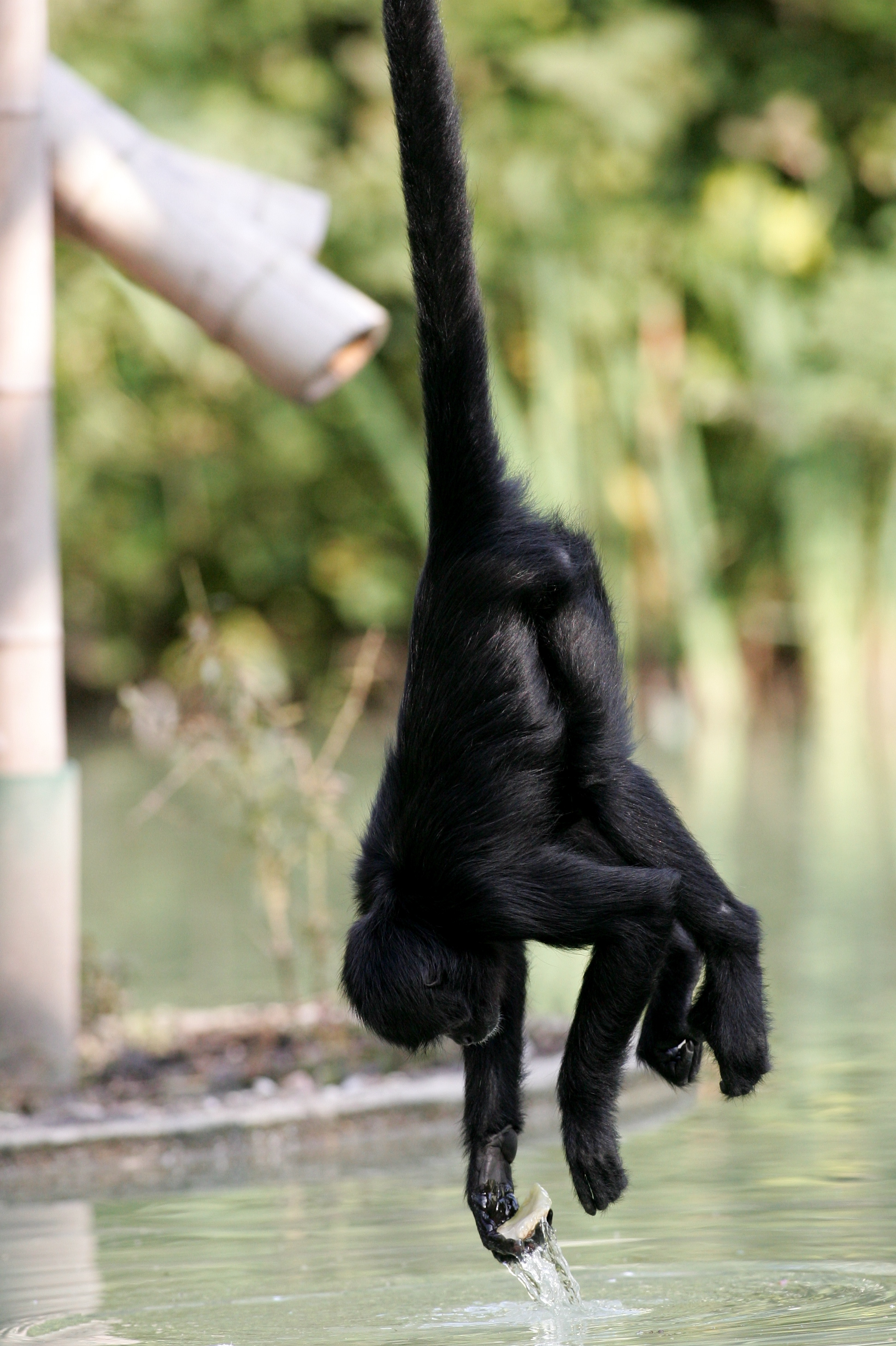
A. f. rufiventris getting something out of the water
