= Feliciano Miguel Abdala Private Natural Heritage Reserve =

Protected area in Minas Gerais, Brazil

- Reserva Particular do Patrimônio Natural Feliciano Miguel Abdala
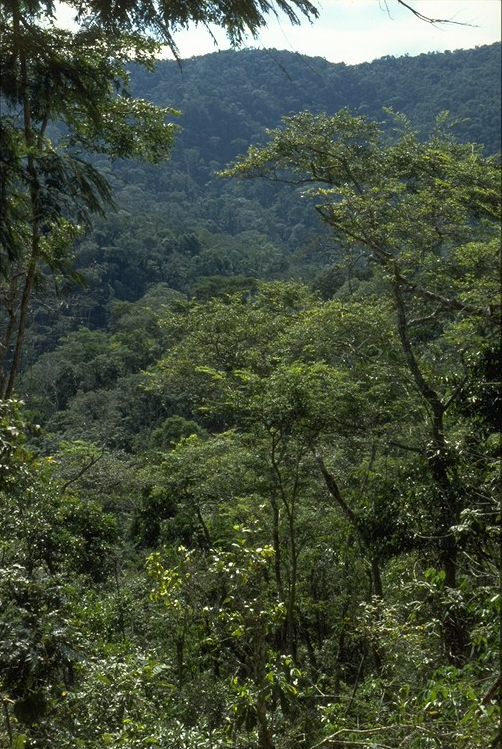
- The reserve in January 2014

- Location within Brazil
- Nearest city: Caratinga, Minas Gerais
- Coordinates: 19.732°S 41.815°W
- Area: 957.57 hectares (2,366.2 acres)
- Designation: Private natural heritage reserve
- Created: 3 September 2001
- Administrator: Preserve-Muriqui
- Website: www.preservemuriqui.org.br

Feliciano Miguel Abdala Private Natural Heritage Reserve (Portuguese: Reserva Particular do Patrimônio Natural Feliciano Miguel Abdala), formerly the Fazenda Montes Claros and then the Caratinga Biological Station, is a privately owned sustainable-use protected area in the state of Minas Gerais, Brazil. It contains an example of Atlantic Forest biome. The reserve is home to rare buffy-headed marmosets and to one of the last wild populations of northern muriqui woolly spider monkeys.

== History ==
Feliciano Miguel Abdalla, the son of a Lebanese immigrant, obtained the Fazenda Montes Claros estate in the state of Minas Gerais in 1944 on condition that he preserve the forest on the property. At this time the settlers in Minas Gerais were clearing the land for agriculture, and conservation was an alien concept. For many years he had to struggle against hunters and people looking to harvest timber and hearts of palm, sometimes at risk to his life. Towards the end of the 1960s Abdalla began to meet researchers. The professors Álvaro Aguirre and then Celio Valle introduced the woods to the scientific community. In 1977 professor Akira Nishimura began the first systemic study of the northern muriquis, to be followed by Russell Mittermeier and Karen B. Strier.

At the time the long-term study of the muriquis began Abdala was in his 70s. Besides the forest, his farm included an active coffee plantation and cattle ranch, and employed over 20 families whose houses were on the farm. Abdala put up researchers in his farmhouse until a small vacated house on the edge of the forest had been renovated. This house became the Caratinga Biological Station (Estação Biológica de Caratinga) in May 1983. The biological station was supported by Abdala, the Federal University of Minas Gerais, the World Wildlife Fund and the Brazilian Foundation for the Conservation of Nature (FBCN). Researchers found buffy-headed marmosets, an endangered species, as well as healthy populations of brown howler and tufted capuchin monkeys.

Abdalla died in June 2000 at the age of 92. The private non-profit Society for Muriqui's Preservation, "Preserve-Muriqui", created by the Abdala' family, now manages the reserve. The Feliciano Miguel Abdala Private Natural Heritage Reserve was created by decree on 3 September 2001. Conservation International Brazil provided technical and financial support for founding the reserve in partnership with the Caratinga Biological Reserve Association and the Biodiversity Foundation (Fundação Biodiversitas).

== Environment ==
The reserve is located in the municipality of Caratinga in the state of Minas Gerais. It has an area of 957.57 hectares (2,366.2 acres). It is located on the left bank of the Manhuaçu River in the Doce River basin. The region has a rugged terrain with altitudes from 318 to 628 metres (1,043 to 2,060 ft). The reserve holds parts of the basins of the Jaó and Matão streams. The climate is hot, with average rainfall of about 1,000 millimetres (39 in), falling mainly in the summer (October to March).

The reserve contains an example of the Atlantic Forest biome. About 80% of the land is covered in well-preserved forest, while the remainder holds abandoned pasturage and secondary growth forest. Many of the neighbours also have small areas of forest beside the reserve. The reserve holds many endemic plants and is home to various endangered birds and mammals. Vegetation is mainly semi-deciduous forest, with the best-preserved parts in the lower areas along the two streams, where the canopy is continuous and about 25 metres (82 ft) high with emergent trees reaching over 35 metres (115 ft) in height. Higher up the primary forest makes way for secondary forest and then bushy scrub at the summit.

The reserve is home to a population of endangered northern muriqui (Brachyteles hypoxanthus) spider monkeys. It has been estimated that there were a million of these monkeys when the Europeans arrived, but they are now on the list of 25 most endangered primates in the world. There were about 60 spider monkeys on the reserve when it was established. As of 2006 there were less than 1,000 surviving individuals in the world, of whom 226 were living in the reserve. By 2011 the reserve had 320 individuals, the largest concentration in the world. About 362 species of vertebrate have been recorded, including 79 species of mammal, 204 species of birds, fish, reptiles and amphibians. The pit viper Lachesis muta and the Natterer's longwing butterfly (Heliconius nattereri) are considered endangered.

== Conservation ==
The reserve is classed as IUCN protected area category IV (habitat/species management area). It has the objective of conserving biological diversity in a private area. Preserve-Muriqui aims to guarantee survival of the northern muriqui in its natural environment and to support research, while working with the inhabitants of neighbouring properties and providing jobs for local people. The reserve has been the subject of many scientific studies including 22 independent research projects and ten PhD theses. The reserve is open to eco-tourists, providing guided tours of the forest. Fees are used to help support the reserve.

Local people are employed at competitive rates on tasks such as opening trails and following the muriquis. This has contributed to local support for conservation and research in the reserve. The Preserve Muriqui has started seedlings of native trees and guided the neighbours to reforest the hilltops to revitalise the springs. It has also taught the neighbours intensive farming techniques to grow more crops while farming a smaller area. The manager of the reserve said that the proprietors of the local farms have become the guardians of the forest.

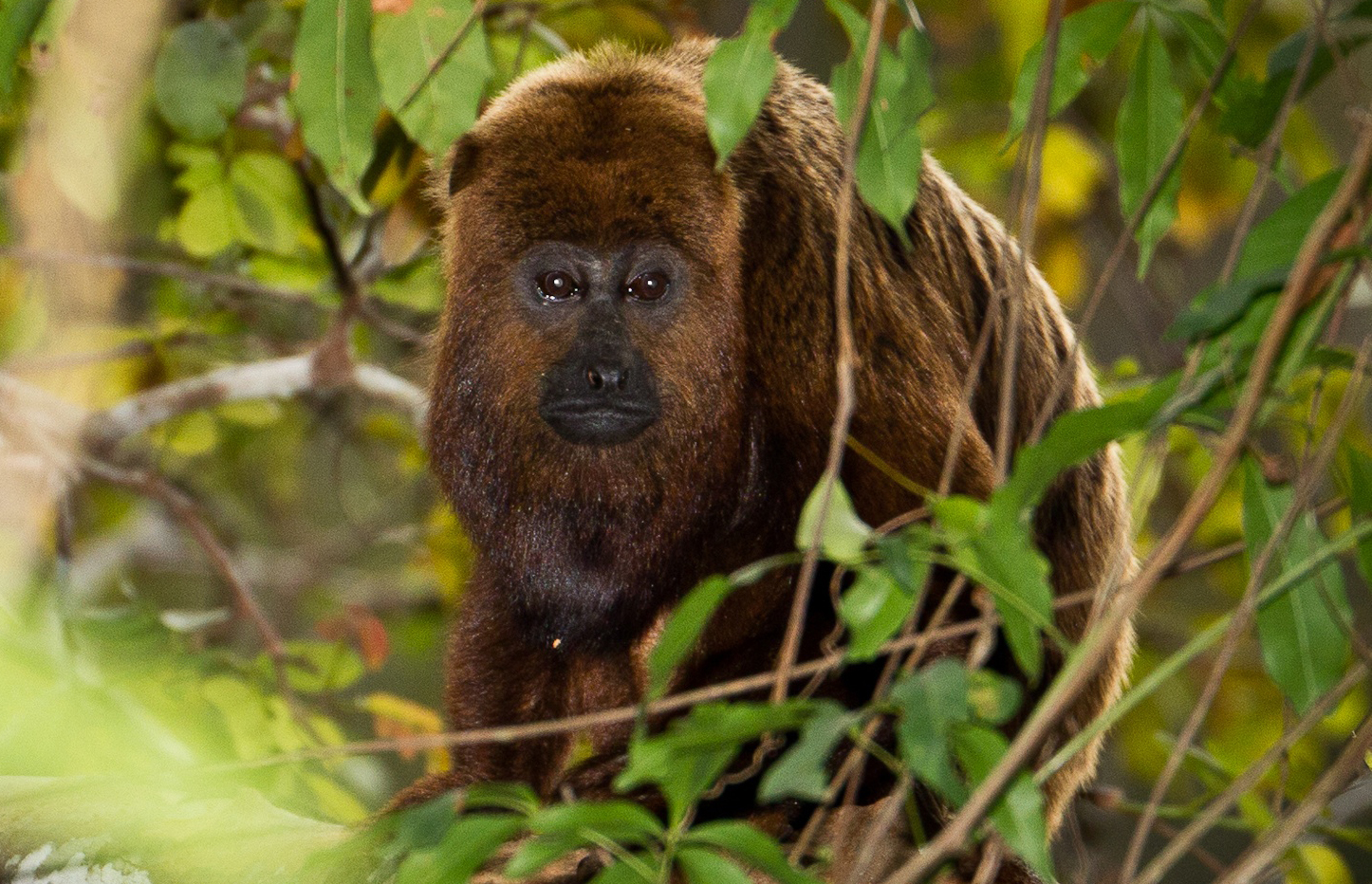
Brown howler

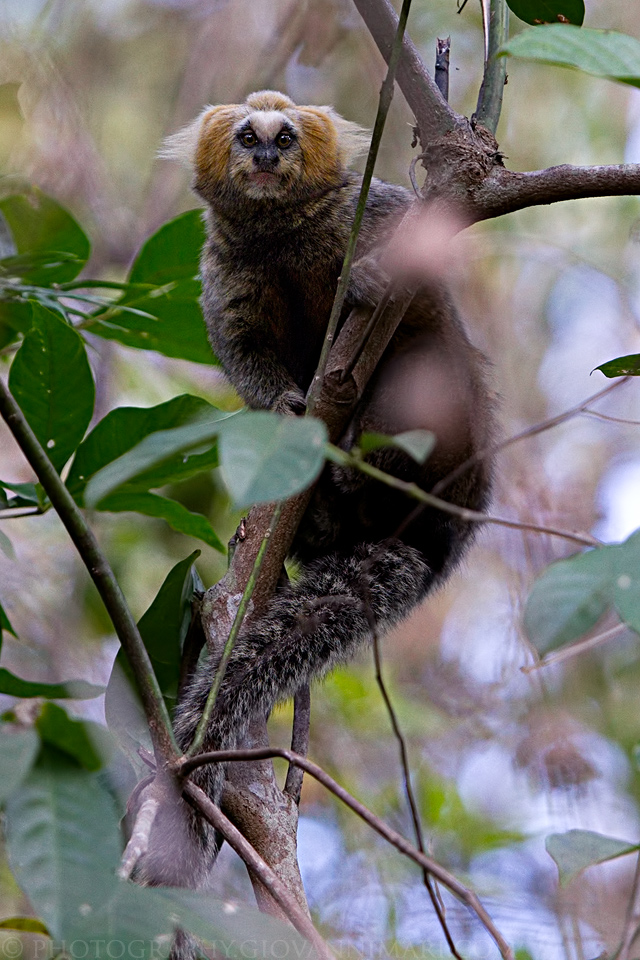
Buffy-headed marmoset

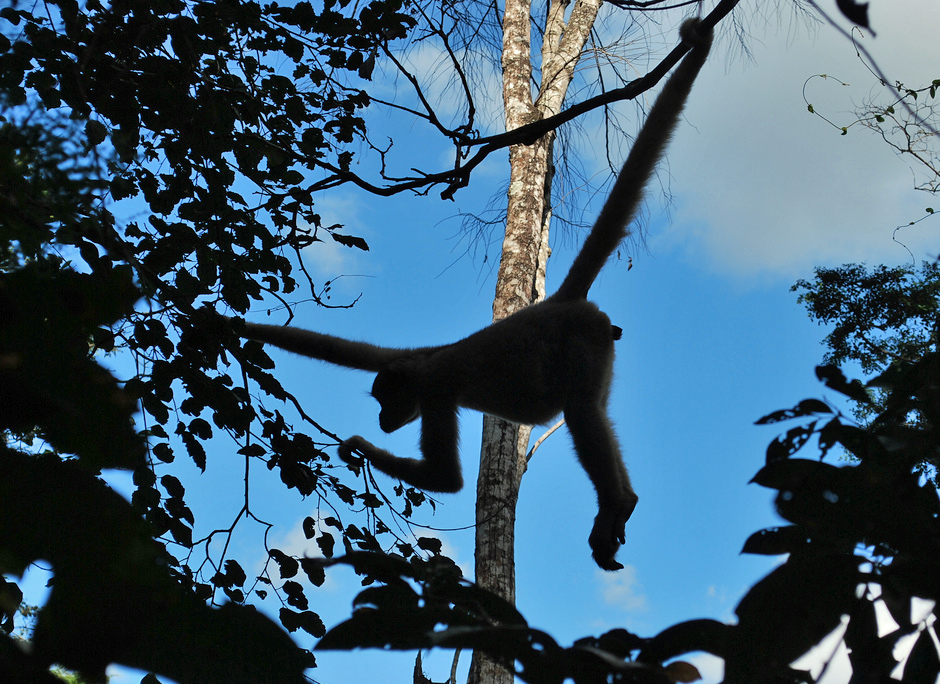
Adult northern muriqui using its prehensile tail

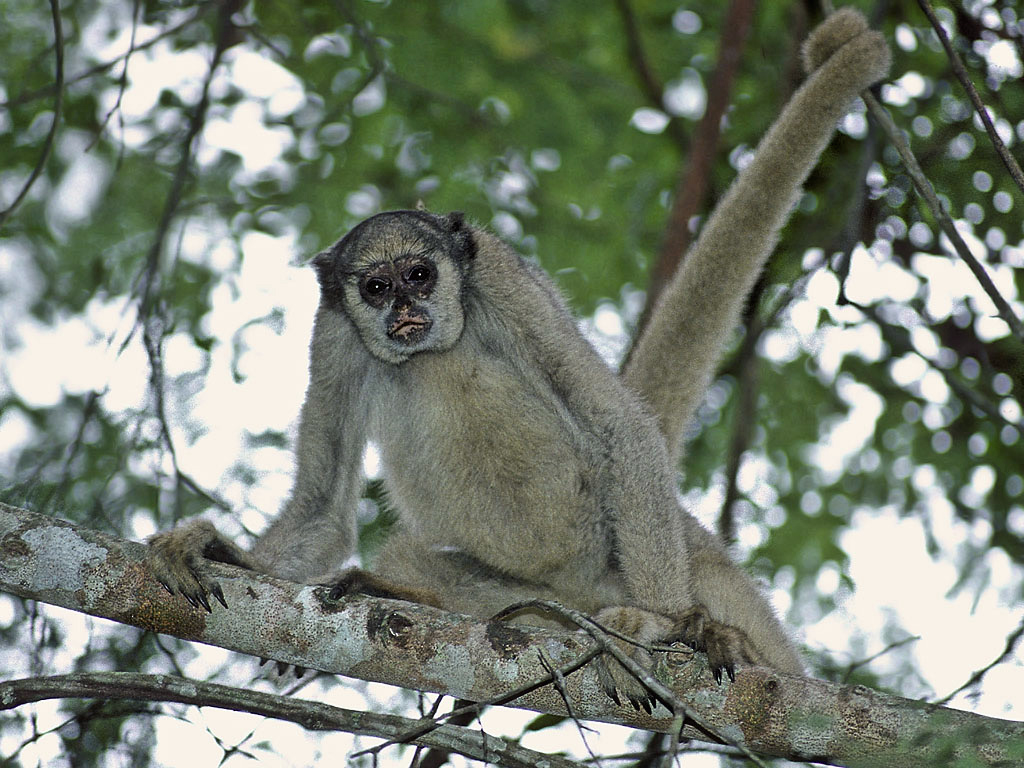
Northern muriqui resting

== Sources ==
- About Us, Preserve Muriqui
- Ecoturism: Visitation, Preserve Muriqui
- Eduardo M. Veado, RPPN Feliciano Miguel Abdala: Characteristics, Preserve-Muriqui
- Home, Preserve-Muriqui
- Karen Strier, Caratinga Biological Station, Preserve Muriqui
- Ramiro Abdala Passos, History, Preserve Muriqui
- "Reserva ambiental particular garante a sobrevivência do macaco muriqui", Jornal Hoje, 22 January 2011
- Reserva Particular do Patrimônio Natural Feliciano Miguel Abdala (in Portuguese), SENAC Minas
- RPPN Feliciano Miguel Abdala (in Portuguese), Chico Mendes Institute for Biodiversity Conservation
- RPPN Feliciano Miguel Abdala, Preserve-Muriqui, archived from the original on 2020-01-17
- Strier, Karen B.; Boubli, Jean P.; Pontual, Francisco B.; Mendes, Sergio L. (2006), "Human Dimensions of Northern Muriqui Conservation Efforts", Ecological and Environmental Anthropology (Paper 6), University of Georgia
- Unidade de Conservação: Reserva Particular do Patrimônio Natural Feliciano Miguel Abdala (in Portuguese), MMA: Ministério do Meio Ambiente
