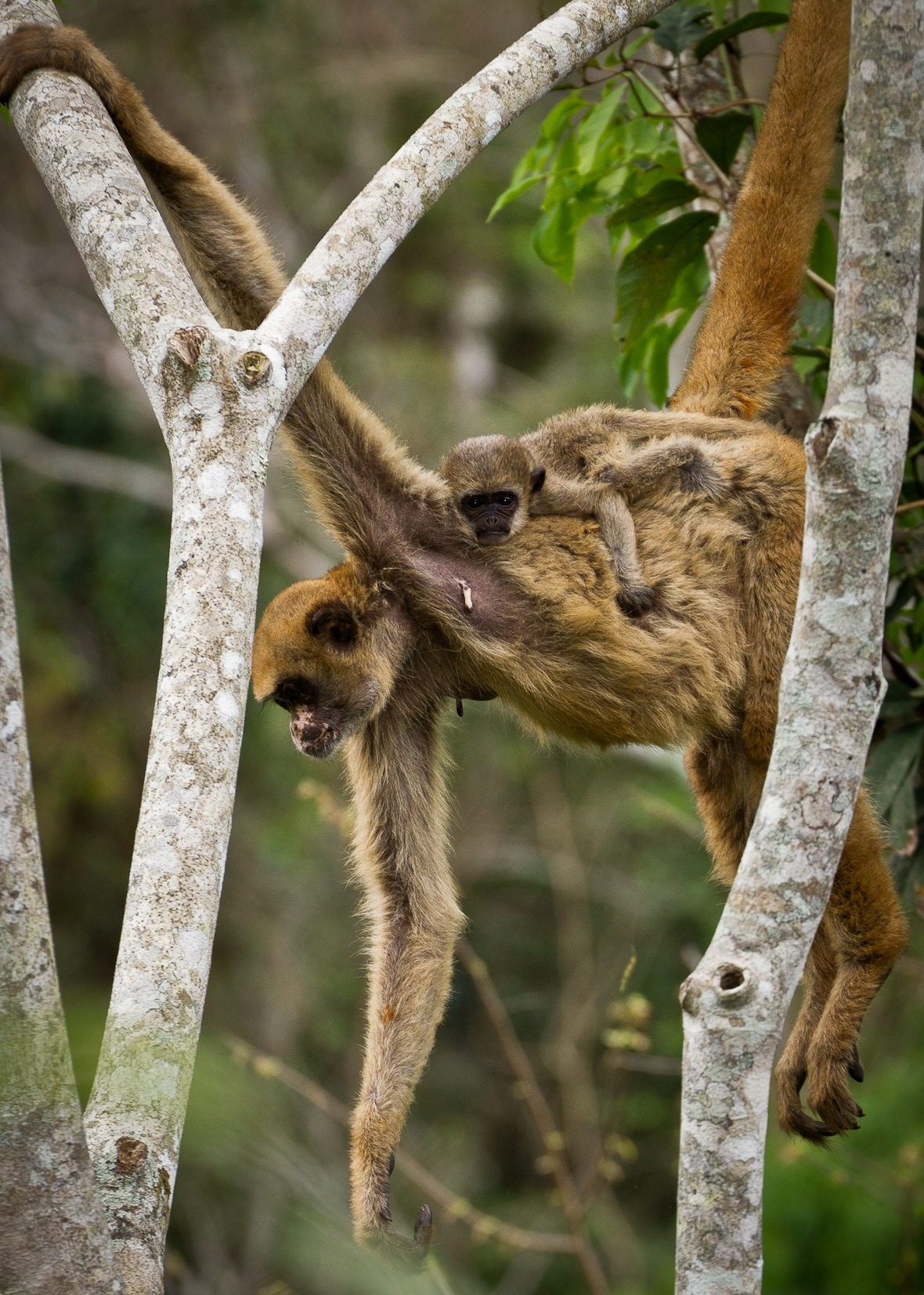
- Female and infant, in Caratinga, Brazil.

Conservation status
- Critically Endangered (IUCN 3.1)
- CITES Appendix I

Scientific classification
- Kingdom: Animalia
- Phylum: Chordata
- Class: Mammalia
- Order: Primates
- Family: Atelidae
- Genus: Brachyteles
- Species: B. hypoxanthus

Binomial name
- Brachyteles hypoxanthus (Kuhl, 1820)
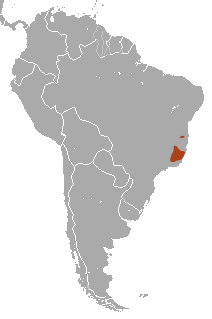
- Northern muriqui range

= Northern muriqui =

Species of New World monkey

The northern muriqui (Brachyteles hypoxanthus) is one of two species of muriqui. They are also known as woolly spider monkey because they exhibit the woollen pelt of woolly monkeys and the long prehensile tail of spider monkeys. Muriquis are the largest extant New World monkeys. They can reach 4.3 feet or 1.3 metres long and weight up to 7 to 10 kilograms (15 to 22 lb).

The northern muriqui is a critically endangered species, it is estimated that there are fewer than 1,000 mature individuals in the wild. The species is unusual among primates in that males and females are about the same size. Males are no bigger or stronger than females, a factor believed to influence their egalitarian tendencies in social relationships. This species is endemic to the Atlantic Forest region of Brazilian states of Rio de Janeiro, Espírito Santo, Minas Gerais and Bahia. Their diets, travel patterns and reproductive cycles are seasonally determined. The size of each group can fluctuate as females move between groups of monkeys.

== Morphology and identification ==
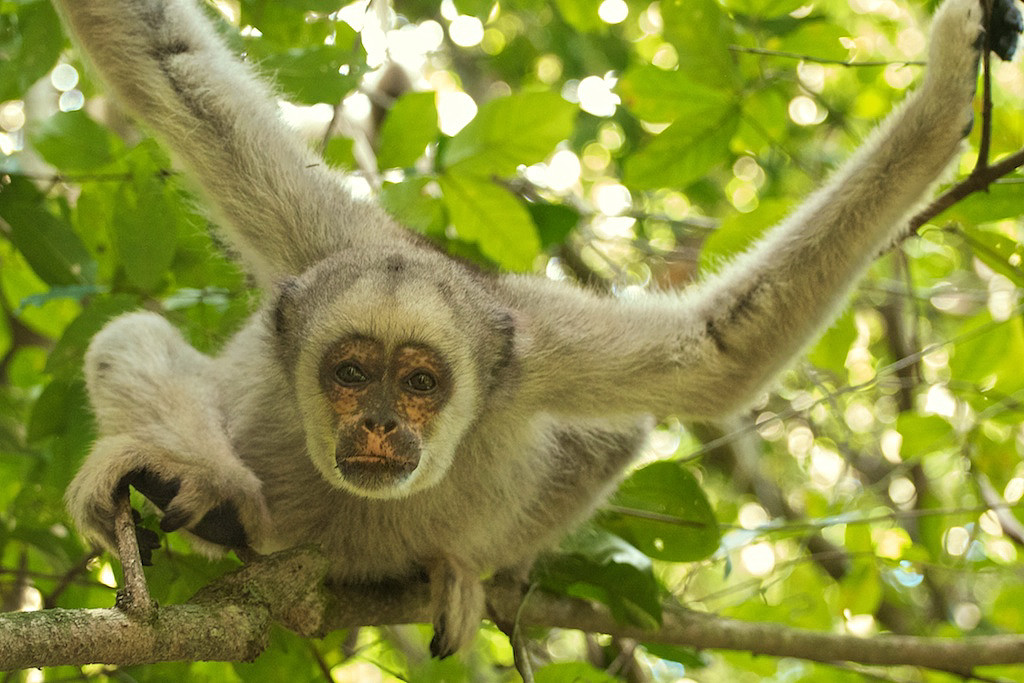
Northern muriquis have natural pale facial marks.

Northern muriquis exhibit features that allow them to utilize all of their limbs and tail for travel and obtaining food items. As they spend much of their life in the canopy of forests, they use brachiation as a form of locomotion utilizing all four limbs and their tail. Evolutionary features that further aid these large atelids are elongated hook-like fingers, and shoulder that allows for a wide range of movement. As these monkeys are primarily suited for life in trees, they still venture down to the ground to drink from water sources, consume soil or to obtain ripe fruit that has fallen. Northern muriquis can be individually recognized by their natural markings and facial features, such as fur color and patterning, ear shape, and face shape and pigmentation. Although southern muriqui exhibit sexual dimorphism in canine length, northern muriqui show none. In another difference, northern muriqui retain vestigial thumbs that are completely absent in their sister species.

== Ecology ==
=== Diet ===
Northern muriqui are frugivorous and folivorous, but they also rely on seeds, flowers, nectar, bark, twigs, stems, vines and soil to supplement additional nutritional needs. Northern muriqui consume the fruits of Margaritaria nobilis, Andira species, Anadenanthera species, Plathymenia foliolosa, Palicourea tetraphylla, Psychotria wamingii, Genipa americana and Carpotroche brasiliensis, as well as the seeds of Mabea fistulifera. The amount of what each group eats depends on seasonality, wherein they will consume foods higher in calories, which results in higher fruit consumption during the wet season, and increased leaf consumption in the dry season. This affect how groups of B. hypoxanthus travel as they forage for food, as bigger family groups need to travel further to attain adequate food sources. The muriqui also utilize vertical niches when foraging, as they can access all levels of forest, from the floor to the canopy. Muriqui group home ranges overlap, so unrelated groups of muriqui will avoid each other by traveling to or foraging for food by using these niche levels.

=== Social structure ===
Northern muriqui live in egalitarian, fission-fusion societies, where the males are philopatric, and females will leave the natal group to join other muriqui groups at an average age of 6 years old before they reach puberty. Male muriqui have been documented to form social cliques within their natal groups, with groups that are differentiated between older males and younger males. Males display tendencies to form cooperative associations between cliques, and therefore leads to diminished intragroup conflicts compared to other species of primate. These tendencies make themselves apparent during mating season as there is little to no aggression displayed between males vying for mating opportunities, or when dealing with other natal groups of muriqui when traveling or defending their own homerange. Different muriqui groups will interact with each other as group home ranges overlap. During these interactions, females can enter new groups by vocalizing and interacting with new group members by hugging or touching them. Female muriquis are more independent than males; they leave their natal groups at an age of about six years. Male muriquis have almost no interaction with infants. When there is an interaction between the two, the infant would be the one to initiate it. Muriqui social groups are dominated by females, and males will continue to associate closely with their mothers into adulthood. It is through their mothers that adult males gain access to more females.

=== Mating and reproduction ===
The Northern muriqui's reproductive cycle is based on the seasonality of their environment. Infants are generally born during the dry season so that when there is a high amount of fruit production during the wet season, they can access calorie dense foods as they are weaned off of their mother’s milk. Females will on average be ready to mate at the age of nine, wherein they can copulate with several partners in order to conceive, however, some males can be shown preferential treatment by females. Evidence points to having multiple partners in order to confuse paternity, limit male aggression, or improving odds of fertilization. The gestation period for northern muriquis is a little over 7 months. The visual determination of sex can be seen within a week or so of birth, based on the shape and positioning of their genitalia. Although there is no definitive research on the average life span of the northern muriqui, some individuals have reached more than 30 years of age.

== Conservation and status ==
B. hypoxanthus is one of the world's most critically endangered primates, according to the IUCN Red List of Threatened Species. It is threatened by hunting and (in common with most other primates of the region) destruction and fragmentation of its Atlantic Forest habitat. Among the scattered populations of northern muriqui, only one population, located in Caratinga, was determined in 2006 to be viable for the rest of the century. Northern muriqui survival is jeopardized by very low genetic diversity, and conservation efforts are hindered by a lack of research on the species. The estimated wild population of northern muriquis was raised from about 500 to 1000 individuals in 2005, due to new discoveries and research in other forests.

== Predation ==
Northern muriqui can be preyed upon by ocelots, tayra, and some birds of prey. If a threat or predator is observed, a group of muriqui will vocally call out to warn others.

== Human evolution relevance ==
The northern muriqui has been argued to be important to understanding human evolution, since it is one of the few primates that has tolerant, nonhierarchial relationships among and between males and females, a feature shared with hunter-gatherer humans, but which contrasts with the ranked relationships of most other primates. Group aggression is also rare. The success of males fathering offspring links to the maternal investment they gain from their mothers and coresident female kin. This provides support to the grandmother hypothesis.

== See also ==
- Feliciano Miguel Abdala Private Natural Heritage Reserve, long thought to be the only place where these monkeys still survive

== Gallery ==
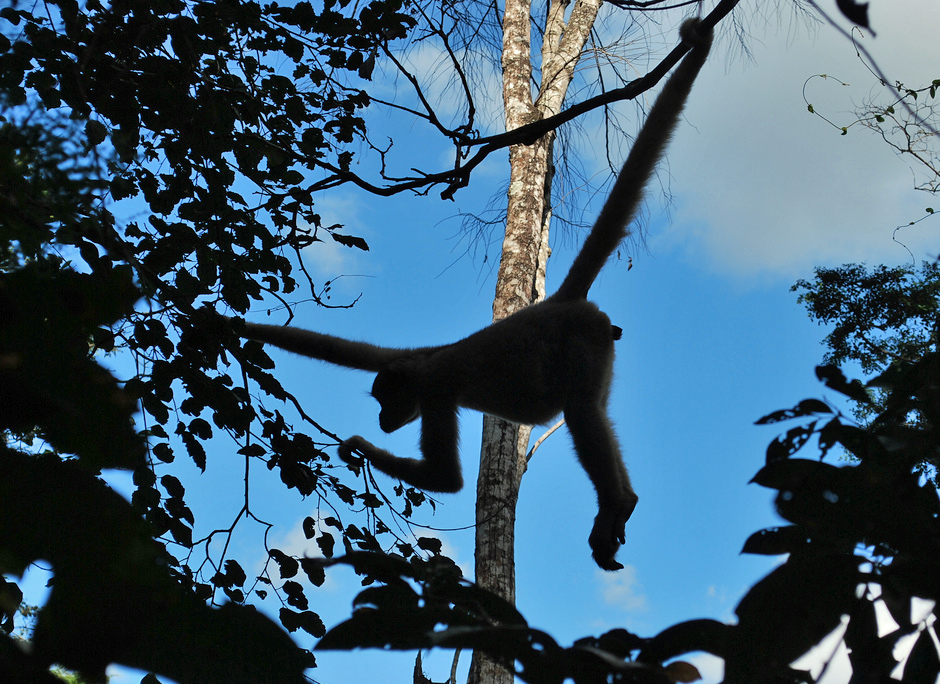
Silhouette of adult using its prehensile tail

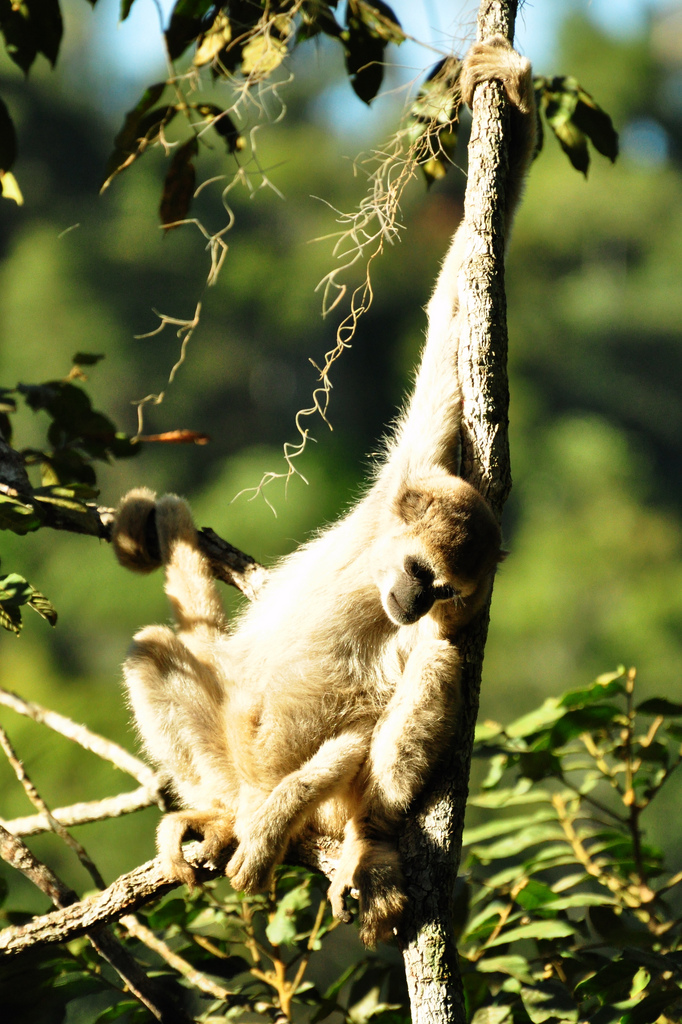
Sitting muriqui

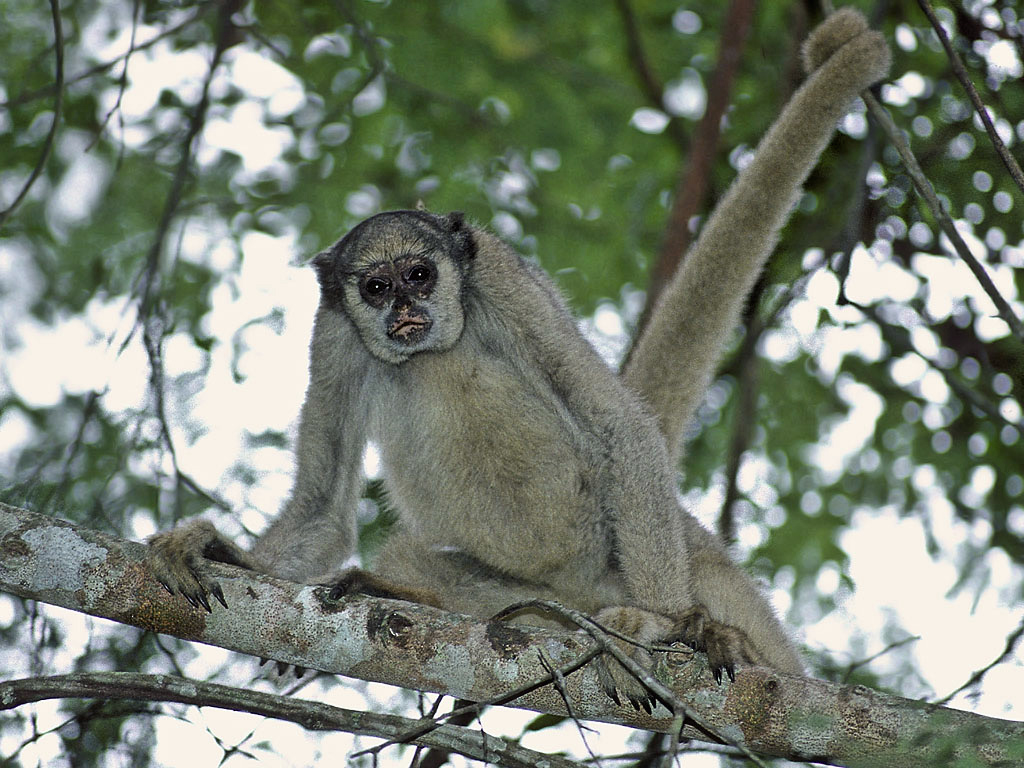
At Caratinga Biological Station
