= Stirtonia =

Stirtonia may refer to:

- Stirtonia (lichen), a genus of lichen in the family Arthoniaceae
- Stirtonia (mammal), a genus of extinct New World monkey
- Stirtonisorex, a genus of extinct shrew formerly known as Stirtonia
- Stirtonanthus, a genus of legumes formerly known as Stirtonia
