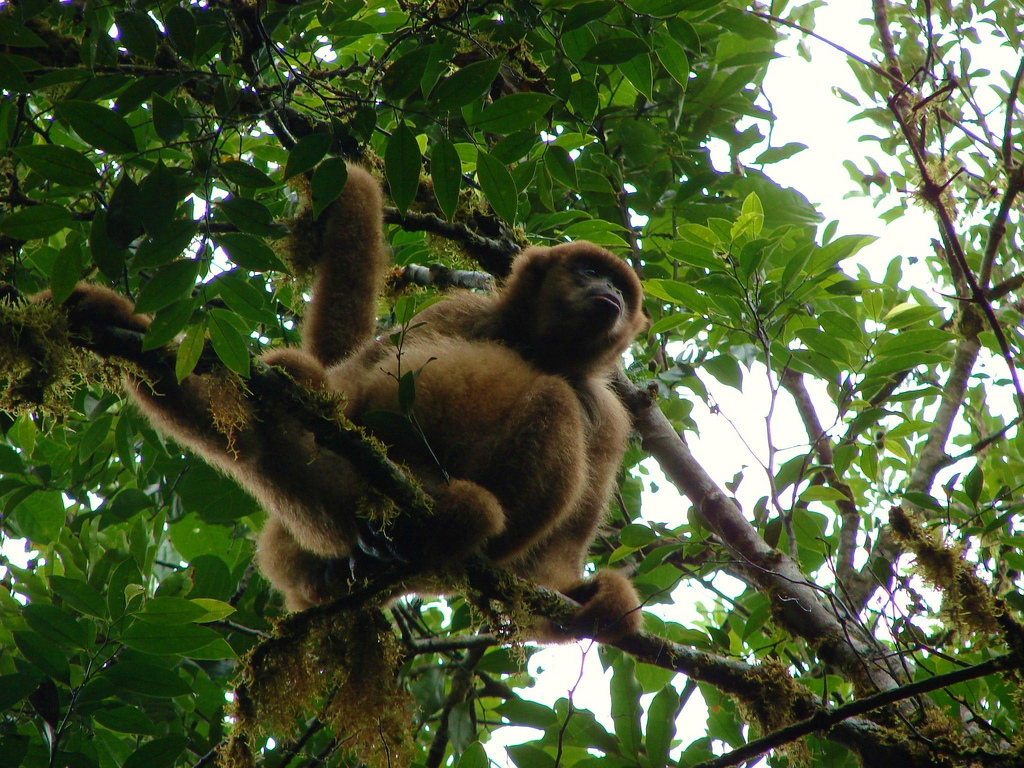

Conservation status
- Critically Endangered (IUCN 3.1)
- CITES Appendix I

Scientific classification
- Kingdom: Animalia
- Phylum: Chordata
- Class: Mammalia
- Infraclass: Placentalia
- Order: Primates
- Family: Atelidae
- Genus: Brachyteles
- Species: B. arachnoides

Binomial name
- Brachyteles arachnoides (É. Geoffroy, 1806)
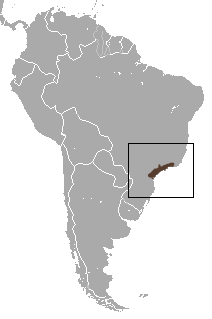
- Southern muriqui range

= Southern muriqui =

Species of New World monkey

The southern muriqui (Brachyteles arachnoides) is a muriqui (woolly spider monkey) species endemic to Brazil.

== Taxonomy ==
Taxonomy of muriquis is controversial because some scientists believe that they are a monotypic genus while others favor a 2-species classification system.

== Distribution and habitat ==
Southern muriquis are now found only in specific areas of the Atlantic rainforest located in Brazil, South America, more specifically they are found in the Brazilian states of Paraná, São Paulo, Rio de Janeiro, Espírito Santo and Minas Gerais. This New World monkey is known locally as mono carvoeiro, which translates to "charcoal monkey".

== Description ==
Muriquis are the largest New World monkeys and largest native primates in the Americas. Male muriquis have a head-body length of 55–78 cm (21.5–30.5 in), with a tail of 74–80 cm (29–31.5 in) and a body weight of 9.6–15 kg (21–33 lb). Females have a head-body length of 46–63 cm (18–25 in), a tail length of 65–74 cm (25.5–29 in) and a body weight of 8–11 kg (18–24 lb). The tails are fully prehensile.

The southern muriqui, B. arachnoides, has a solid black face, distinguishing it from the northern species, B. hypoxanthus, which has a black face mottled with pink.

== Diet ==
Southern muriqui are frugivores, which means that fruit is the preferred food type. They have been claimed to possess the most diverse fruit diet in the Atlantic, and also consume leaves, flowers and a few species of seeds (such as sapucaia, amexia-bicha, Inga, Bicuiba and jatobá). The southern muriqui rely on more than one food source to fulfill nutrient and energy needs. Muriquis play a major role in seed dispersal and are known to provide complementary foraging opportunities for tapirs.

== Behavior ==
Like chimpanzees, male southern muriquis are philopatric, while females immigrate to spread genetic diversity and avoid incestuous breeding with their relatives. They preferentially eat fruit, flowers, and buds and rely on tree bark and leaves as fallback food.

Males within a community are tolerant of each other and intergroup aggression is rare. Although this species is nicknamed the "hippie monkey", due to their relaxed intergroup relationships, their attitude towards outsider males is far from harmonious, as a group of males was observed killing a male from outside their group (a trait shared with chimpanzees), though it is not known if this degree of aggression is natural or induced due to a lack of resources. It is unclear if Northern muriquis also exhibit this degree of aggression.

== Predation ==
Predators of southern muriquis include grey-headed kites.

== Conservation ==
This species is considered endangered because of habitat destruction, hunting pressures, and historic population declines. Only two captive populations of the southern muriqui exist. They are housed at the zoos of Curitiba and Sorocaba. The latter is located 80 km from the only long-term investigation of the southern muriqui in continuous forest, the Carlos Botelho State Park. The wild population was estimated at 1,300 in 2005.

Muriquis are the largest neotropical primates and are considered a flagship species.

In 2005, scientists, zookeepers, NGOs, and many others discussed priorities and strategies to protect muriquis from extinction. The Brazilian government in 2010 recognized the National Action Plan for the Conservation of Muriquis.
