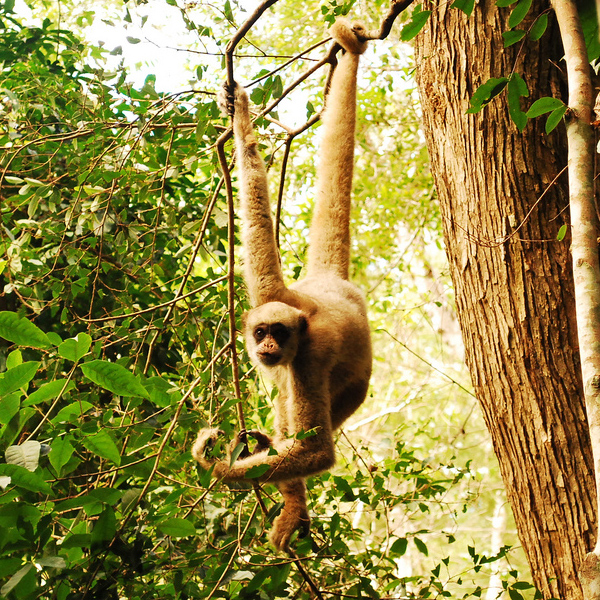
- Northern muriqui, Brachyteles hypoxanthus

Scientific classification
- Kingdom: Animalia
- Phylum: Chordata
- Class: Mammalia
- Order: Primates
- Family: Atelidae
- Subfamily: Atelinae
- Genus: Brachyteles; Spix, 1823

Type species
- Brachyteles macrotarsus Spix, 1823 (= Ateles arachnoides É. Geoffroy, 1806)

Species
- Brachyteles arachnoides Brachyteles hypoxanthus

= Muriqui =

Muriquis

Genus of New World monkeys

The muriquis, also known as woolly spider monkeys, are the monkeys of the genus Brachyteles. They are closely related to both the spider monkeys and the woolly monkeys.

== Species ==
The two species are:

Genus Brachyteles – Spix, 1823 – two species
Common name	Scientific name and subspecies	Range	Size and ecology	IUCN status and estimated population
Southern muriqui	Brachyteles arachnoides (É. Geoffroy, 1806)	Brazil (Paraná, São Paulo, Rio de Janeiro, Espírito Santo and Minas Gerais)	Size: Habitat: Diet:	CR
Northern muriqui	Brachyteles hypoxanthus (Kuhl, 1820)	Brazil (Rio de Janeiro, Espírito Santo, Minas Gerais and Bahia.)	Size: Habitat: Diet:	CR

They are the two largest species of New World monkeys, and the northern species is one of the most endangered of all the world's monkeys.

The muriqui lives primarily in coffee estates in southeastern Brazil. Males are the same size and weight as females.
