= Baro (surname) =

Baro or Baró is a Spanish surname and Boro surname. Notable people with the surname include:

== Baro ==
- Alexis Baro, Cuban-Canadian trumpet player and composer
- Alicia Baro (1918–2012), human rights activist
- Ana Baro (born 1992), Albanian footballer
- Balthazar Baro (1596–1650), French poet, playwright, and romance-writer
- Bhupen Baro, Indian politician
- Eguinaire Baron or Baro (1495–1550), French jurist
- Justin Damo Baro, Burkinabe economist and politician
- Maheswar Baro, Assam politician
- Peter Baro (1534–1599), French huguenot minister

== Baró ==
- Alan Baró (born 1985), Spanish footballer
- Albert Baró (born 1996), Spanish actor
- Alberto Rodríguez Baró (born 1997), Spanish professional footballer
- Amparo Baró (1937–2015), Spanish actress
- Andreu Veà Baró (born 1969), Spanish engineer
- Ángel Sánchez Baró (born 1997), Spanish footballer
- Antonio Baró, Spanish footballer
- Bernardo Baró (1896–1930), Cuban baseball player
- Carlota Baró (born 1989), Spanish actress
- Erlys García Baró (born 1985), Cuban footballer
- Gregorio Baró (1928–2012), Argentinian scientist
- Joaquim Veà Baró (1958–2016), Catalan primatologist
- Josep Tapiró Baró (1836–1913), Spanish painter
- Marc Baró (born 1999), Spanish footballer
- María Dámasa Jova Baró (1890–1940), Cuban writer, educator, and feminist
- Pere Baró (born 1991), Andorran politician
- Romário Baró (born 2000), Swiss professional footballer

== Báró ==
- Anna Báró (1920–1994), Hungarian stage, film, television, and voice actress

== Fictional characters ==
- Shōei Barō, a character from the manga/anime series Blue Lock

== See also ==
- Baro (disambiguation)
- Alfredo García-Baró (born 1972), Cuban sprinter
- Ignacio Martín-Baró (1942–1989), Spanish social psychologist
