= Joaquim Veà Baró =

Primatologist

- Joaquim Josep Veà i Baró
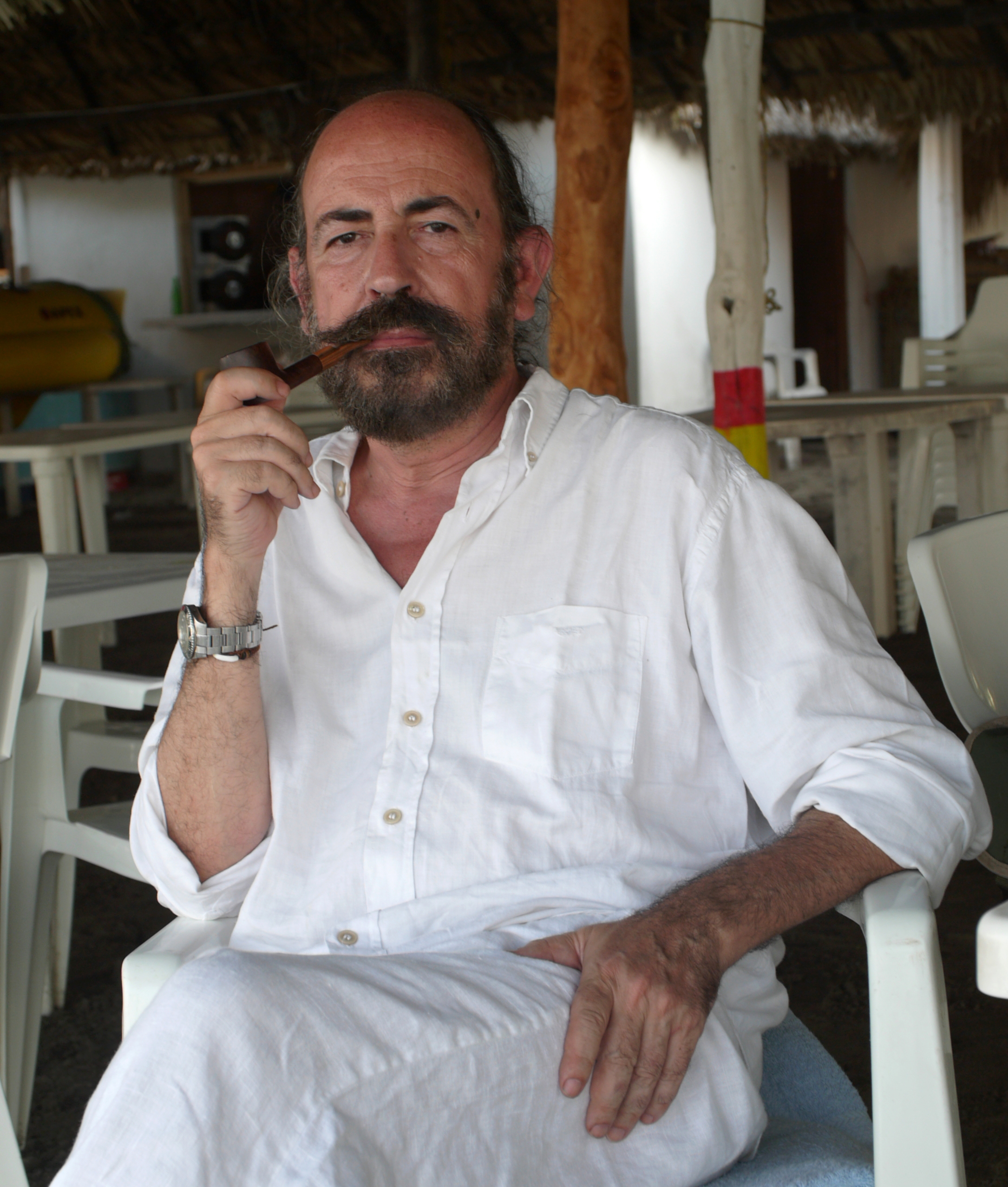
- Born: 11 October 1958; Barcelona, Spain
- Died: 23 February 2016 (aged 57); Barcelona, Spain
- Resting place: Cementiri Municipal de Sant Sebastià, Sitges, Barcelona. Nínxol 587; 41°14′11.7″N 1°49′03.2″E
- Other names: Ricard Baró, nickname as a photograph
- Education: Universitat de Barcelona
- Scientific career
- Fields: Primatology
- Thesis: Modelos funcionales en la conducta animal: Simulación de un sistema motivacional (in Spanish) (1986)
- Doctoral advisor: Jaume Arnau i Gras

Joaquim Veà Baró (11 October 1958 – 23 February 2016) was a Catalan primatologist.

Baró was a student of Jordi Sabater Pi, as well as a biopsychology professor at the University of Barcelona and the director of the university's Primate Research Centre. His research in the jungles of Zaire and Veracruz focused on the relationship between the environment and behavior of primates, and changes in their relationships due to human activity.

He died in Barcelona on 23 February 2016, two years after being diagnosed with cancer.

== Career ==
Joaquim Veà, was born on 11 October 1958, and grew up in the neighbourhood of Sant Andreu de Palomar in Barcelona. The Internet scholar Andreu Veà Baró is his brother. He completed his degree in Psychology at the University of Barcelona in 1983, and three years later, in 1986, his doctorate with a thesis on animal behavior, named "Functional models in animal behavior: simulation of a motivational system".

Before completing his degree he published “IQ and individual differences” (1982), and from 1983 he started to become interested in issues of animal behavior, a subject on which he developed his doctoral thesis after publishing “Cognitive processes in animal behavior: an psycho-linguistic application” (1983), and “Symbolic behavior in the white rat: simulation of the learning of words” (1986), pieces of work which analysed the possibilities of extrapolating to humans the results of behavioral experiments on lower animals.

Veà was a close associate and protégée of Jordi Sabater Pi, the discoverer of the white gorilla Copito de Nieve. Veà collaborated with Sabater Pi in research on bonobos (pygmy chimpanzees) in the jungle of Zaire in 1988. Research he conducted within the period of 1985-1996, focused on behavioral variability and the processes of adaption. On top of joint publications with Sabater Pi, various studies on primate behavior stand out from this period, including “Instrumental behavior of the chimpanzee (Pan troglodytes) in its natural habitat” (1988), and “Innovation and diffusion of behavior patterns in primate societies: the birth of culture” (1990). He also accompanied Sabater Pi in 1997 when he was president of the Spanish Association of Primatology, Veà acting as vice-president.

In 2000 he completed an award-winning project on the Conkouati-Douli National Park (Republic of the Congo).

=== Relationship with Veracruz ===
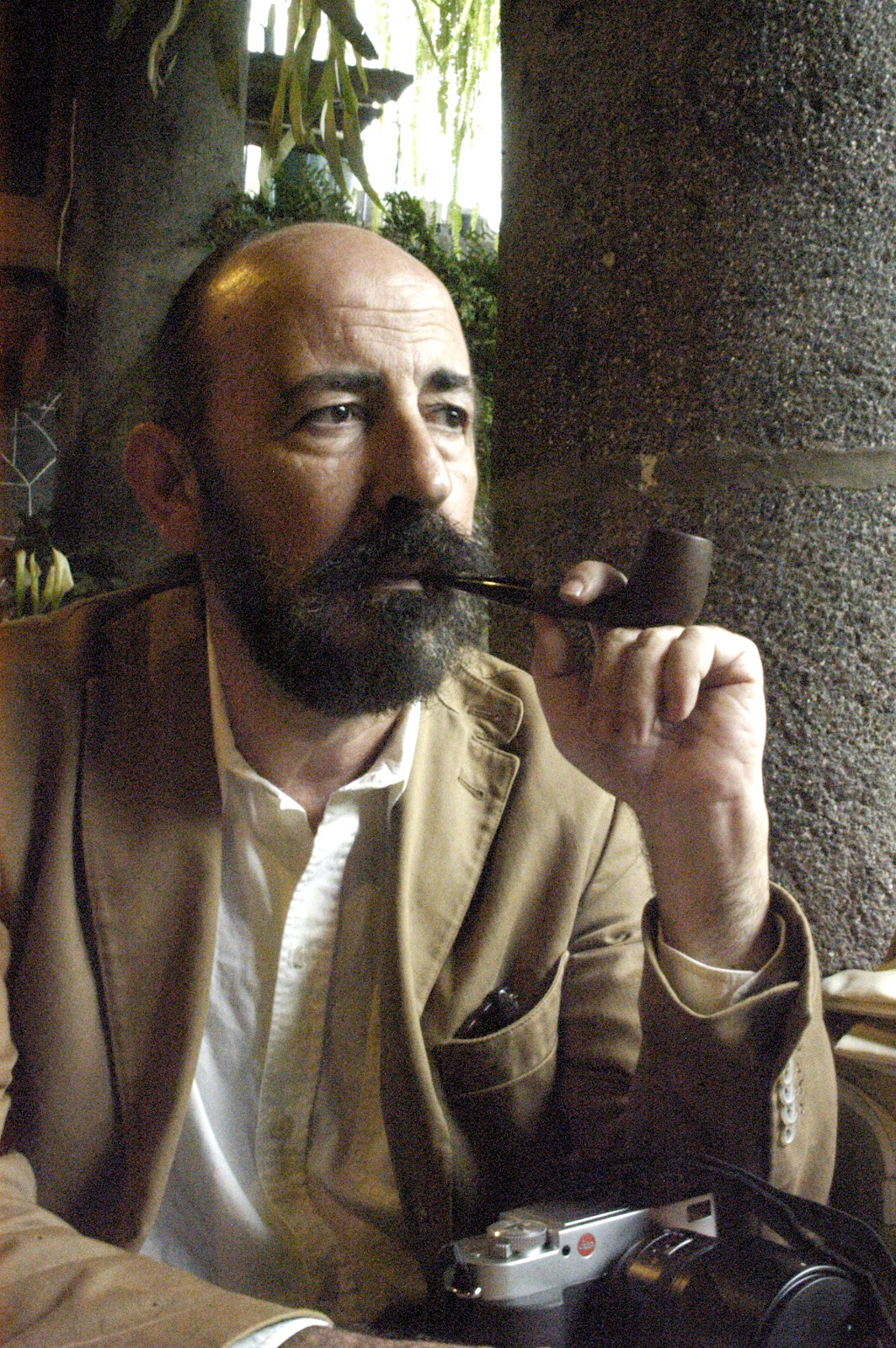
Veà in Veracruz, 2011

Veà's relationship with the University of Veracruz began in 1997 when he participated in an exchange program for university professors organised by the Spanish Agency for International Development Cooperation, which he repeated in 1998 and again in 1999. It was in Veracruz where he met Ernesto Rodríguez Luna, with whom he continued to collaborate later on.

This first contact made it possible to sign a collaboration agreement between the Faculty of Psychology at the University of Barcelona and the Institute of Neuroethology at the University of Veracruz in 2000.

In 2001, he first came into contact with Los Tuxtlas Biosphere Reserve in Veracruz, Mexico. Considered the most northern jungle on the planet and declared a biosphere reserve by UNESCO, Veà saw an opportunity to deepen the study of ethological factors initiated by Sabater Pi.

From 2002 he extended the institutional collaboration incorporating students from both universities in the investigation work in the jungle. This activity has allowed the participation of fifty students in the first ten years, whose work is summed up in twenty theses on aspects related to alouatta palliata populations, studied in-situ, half of which Joaquim Veà himself supervised.

In 2005 he began to research the effects of isolation in “fragments of rainforest” – caused by deforestation – on the populations of alouatta (howler monkeys). Alouatta are tree-dwelling animals that live virtually without touching the ground; the fragmentation of the rainforest causes them to become immobilized in one area.

In 2011 he undertook a new campaign in Los Tuxtlas at the San Martin Volcano, part of a joint project between the University of Barcelona and the University of Veracruz. The team, co-directed by Joaquim Veà and Ernesto Rodríguez Luna from the Mexican university, investigated the impact of territorial fragmentation on the conservation of the alouatta palliata. Although the species is not endangered on a global scale, within the jungle of Veracruz researchers have detected a decrease in the population, inspiring this collaborative work of analysis.

One of the reasons behind the decrease is due to the competition with humans for space. Speaking of this topic, Veà stated in 2011: “We have to plan how human populations are going to live alongside conservation policies in this habitat. We cannot trust in ‘sustainable’ use of natural resources, because when humans aren't able to extract the resources they want, the process intensifies, breaking the ecological equilibrium. It is therefore vital to include the human population in conservation policies”.

To monitor the possible migration of different isolated spaces within the jungle, they launched a program of genetic monitoring of populations in collaboration with the University of Cambridge.

The results of the studies on the fragmentation of populations identified an increase in stress, especially among females, when a male from outside the group approached the area, because they felt that their offspring are being threatened. In addition, food limitation in areas of reduced surface area was forcing individuals to adapt their diet to increased food deprivation. Veà highlighted that “although this situation revealed up to what point individuals have the capacity for adaption, in some cases, undernourishment can lead to health problems that would make the population inviable”. Results can be compared to humans who “do not always eat everything which they should, for example in underdeveloped countries that have problems with malnutrition, rickets, a range of illnesses, but this does not put an end to the population, but rather provokes them to change their characteristics”.

=== Special Centre of Primate Research ===
Since 1991, research groups at the University of Barcelona interested in the origin of the human species and primate behavior have been working in collaboration, a unique initiative in the international sphere. For the first time, the study of evolution and the behavior of the human species, as well as of other primates, was being conducted between research teams from different backgrounds: Evolution of Hominids and Other Primates; HOMINID, Human Origins Group, and Information Technology in behavioral Sciences. This collection of researchers constituted the Special Centre of Primate Research (CERP in Catalan), of which Joaquim Veà was director. It is from this centre, at the University of Barcelona, from which all field work on primates is coordinated.

=== Teaching activities ===
In the latter phase of his life, Veà was appointed tenured professor of the Department of Psychiatry and Clinical Psychobiology at the University of Barcelona.

He supervised twelve doctoral theses related to the research of primates in Veracruz, at the Autonomous University of Madrid and the University of Barcelona.

He was also part of the scientific council for different international postgraduate studies, such as “Animal behavior and Portugal Primatology” – Mexico 2008-2009.

== Other activities ==
Joaquim Veà was a multitalented person, an avid reader, concerned about the society that surrounded him. He was capable of combining activities such as being a voluntary fireman with educational actions on human communication. His cultural inquisitiveness allowed him to link with the Sitges Historical Studies Centre from its foundation in 1975, and he was appointed chair of the organisation in 1992.

Photography as a basic tool for any researcher became one of Veà's passions, and he was able to turn what only had functional and scientific value into works of art. For his photographic work, the scientist used the pseudonym Ricard Baró. He had held various exhibitions in Sitges, Barcelona and Mexico, where he had the support of Rosa María López, director of the Fototeca Juan Malpica Mimendi in the city of Veracruz, who he met on one of his trips and was later to be his wife. Dedicated to photography since the 1980s, he moved from analogue to digital and developed a style based on digital processing and the colour saturation to create magical photographs.

He often took photographs of the female nude, and of nature in the jungle of Veracruz. In an exhibition in Xalapa under the title “The naked tremor of slim trees”, Ricardo Baró used his images to demonstrate the human pressure on the jungle which he had observed in his research:

"The trees hold up the sky" said our ancestors
And they know, the sky is now falling on top of us
Is it possible to show the beauty of disaster? I think so.

— Ricard Baró (Joaquim Veà’s pseudonym)

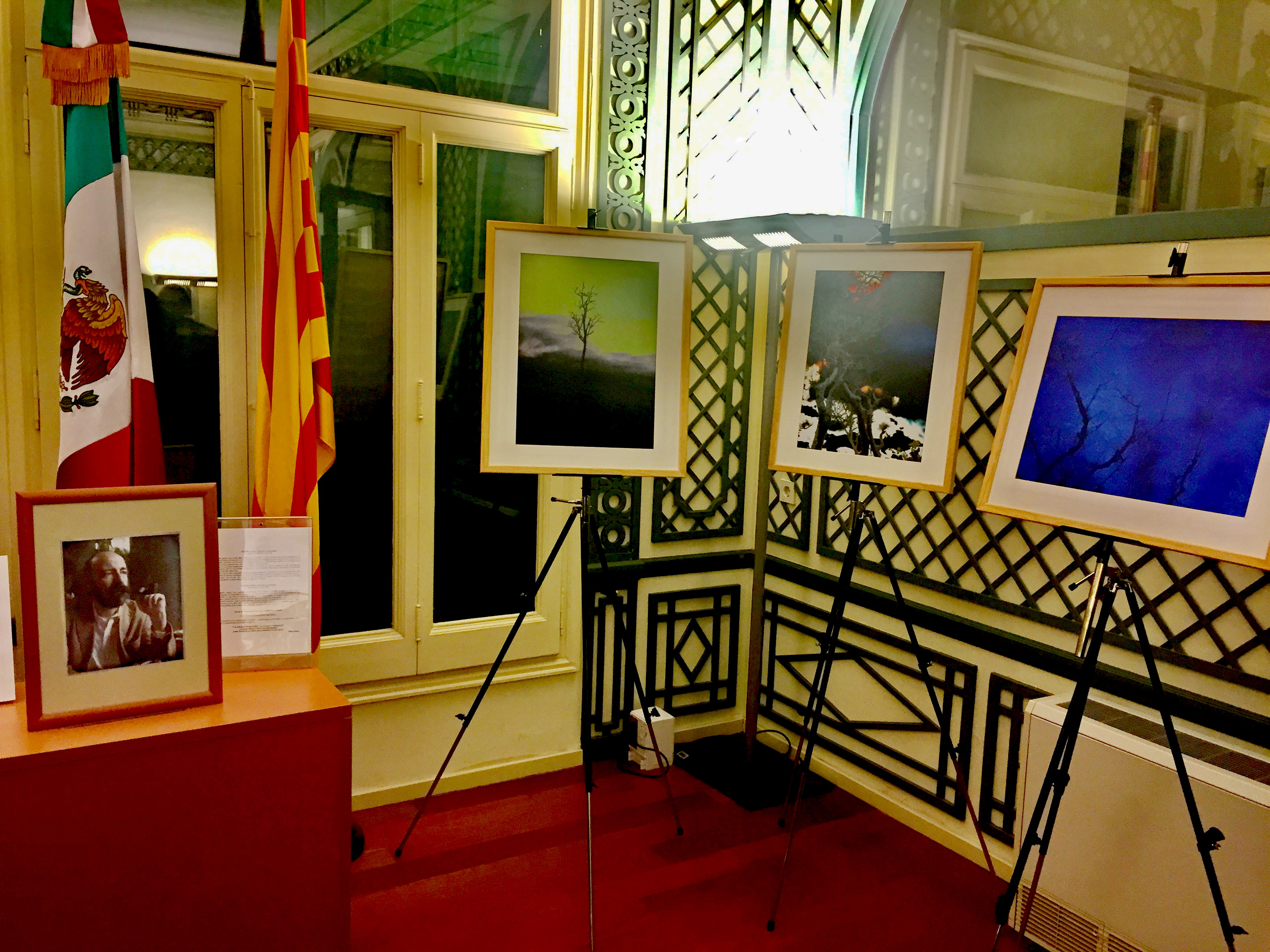
Joaquim Vea's last photographic exhibition at Mexico embassy of Barcelona. December 2015

The last exhibition was held at the Mexican embassy of Barcelona in December 2015, when Veà had advanced cancer which would end his life a year later; it was a special tribute from the Mexican authorities for his professional involvement with the state of Veracruz and its natural reserve over the last 15 years.

He died in Barcelona on February 23, 2016, two years after his illness was diagnosed.

== Notable publications ==
- Veà Baro, J.J. Cociente intellectual y differencias individuales (in Spanish). Oikos-Tau, 1982. ISBN 84-281-0508-1.
- Veà Baró, J.J.; Colell, Montserrat. Etología. Universidad de Barcelona, 1997. ISBN 84-922004-5-6.
- Sabater Pi, Jordi; Veà Baró, J.J.. Nest building and population estimates of the bonobo from the Lokofe-Lilungu-Ikomaloki Region of Zaire, 1990.
- Sabater Pi, Jordi; Veà Baró, J.J.. Estudio eto-ecológico del chimpance bonobo (Pan paniscus) de la región de Lokofe-Lilungu-Ikomakoli (Dist. de Ikela) Zaire (in Spanish), 1990.
- Veà Baró, J.J.; Sabater Pi, Jordi. Técnicas para el estudio de los primates en su hábitat natural (in Spanish). Universidad de Barcelona. Departamento de Psiquiatría y Psicobiologia Clínica, 1995.
- Veà Baró, J.J.; Colell Mimó, Montserrat. Etología. Ediciones Universitat Barcelona, 1997. ISBN 9788492200450 [Enquiry: 23 December 2015].
- Veà Baró, J.J.; Sabater Pi. «Técnicas para lo estudio de la conducta de los primates en su habitado natural». A: Observación en etología (animal-humana) (in Spanish). Ediciones Universidad Barcelona, 1999. ISBN 9788483381113 [Enquiry: 23 December 2015].
- Martínez Contreras, Jorge; Veà Baró, J.J.. Primates : evolución, cultura y diversidad : homenaje a Jordi Sabater Pí (in Spanish). México, D.F.: Centro de Estudios Filosóficos, Políticos y Sociales Vicente Lombardo Toledano, 2002.
- Veà Baró, J.J. Primates: Origin, Evolution and behavior. Parco Científico de Barcelona, 2003. ISBN 9788460766360.
