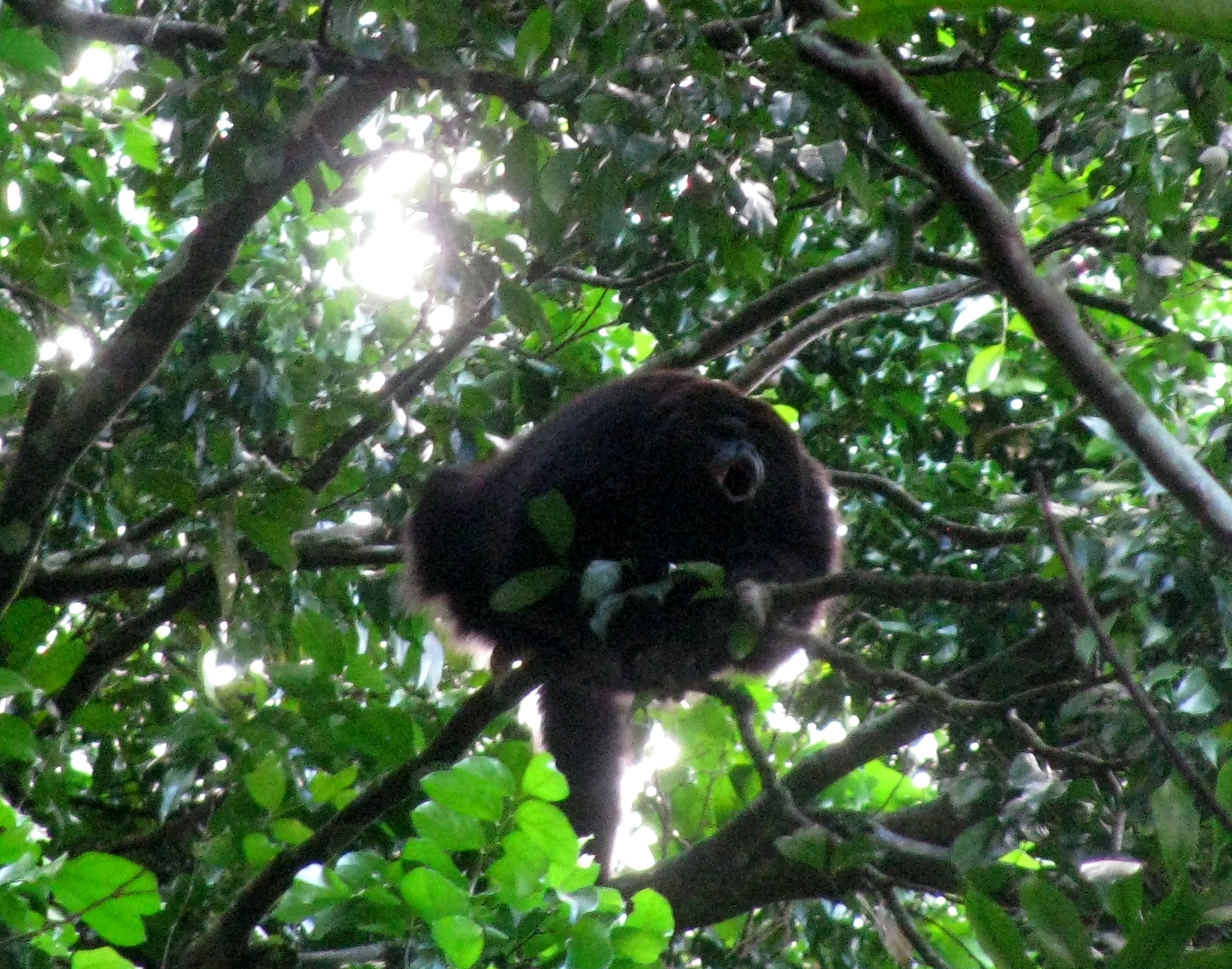
- A Mexican howler

Conservation status
- Endangered (IUCN 3.1)
- CITES Appendix I

Scientific classification
- Kingdom: Animalia
- Phylum: Chordata
- Class: Mammalia
- Order: Primates
- Family: Atelidae
- Genus: Alouatta
- Species: A. palliata
- Subspecies: A. p. mexicana

Trinomial name
- Alouatta palliata mexicana Merriam, 1902

= Mexican howler =

Subspecies of New World monkey

The Mexican howler (Alouatta palliata mexicana) is a subspecies of the mantled howler, A. palliata. This subspecies is found predominantly in forests between south eastern Mexico and north eastern Peru. Typical of its species, the Mexican howler monkey has a prehensile tail, a deep jaw, and a large pharynx which it uses to make characteristically deep and resonating howls. Mantled howler monkeys are known for forming unusually large cohorts averaging 14 members and sometimes extending to 40 members.

== Taxonomy ==
There are five subspecies of the A. palliata which are Alouatta palliata aequatorialis, Alouatta palliata coibensis, Alouatta palliata palliata, Alouatta palliata trabeata and Alouatta palliata mexicana. Compared with members of the howler monkey genus, the Mexican howler is sympatric with the Guatemalan black howler, A. pigra, in Tabasco, Mexico. The Mexican howler differs from the golden-mantled howler, A. palliata palliata, primarily in aspects of skull morphology, and in some differences in pelage. The golden-mantled howler's range includes parts of Guatemala and Honduras, and it is not clear if the Mexican and golden-mantled howler's ranges currently are in contact.

== Geography ==
The Mexican howler monkey is primarily located between south eastern Mexico and north eastern Peru. 2020, this subspecies was determined to be endangered by the International Union for Conservation of Nature. due to the loss of its natural habitat as a result of deforestation. It is now located only in patches of forestry within these regions because loss of habitat has been so extensive. Disturbances to the habitat of the Mexican howler have caused detrimental effects to the spatial organization of the different groups of howler monkeys. These groups are forced into closer proximity to each other contributing to the scarcity of food and depletion of nutrients as these monkeys are forced to scavenge.

== Diet ==
The Mexican howler can eat a remarkable variety of foods including leaves, flower, buds, petioles, and fruits. This subspecies of howler monkey is known to be a frugivore and a behavioural folivores. Their digestive system is slow and they have significantly fewer enzymes for protein and fiber digestion than other frugivores, but they compensate for this by selectively eating leaves with less fiber. Consequently, much of this the Mexican howler monkey's activity is dedicated for foraging for fruit and young leaves which it can easily digest. Frugivory is typically observed in New World monkeys instead of Old World monkeys, but howler monkeys are an exception to this categorization.

== Behavior ==
This howler monkey species has compensated for its adapted digestive system by minimizing energy output as much as possible. The Mexican howler exhibits limited interaction with members of its species and very minor aggressive behavior. There is evidence of physical aggression between members of the species during migratory periods or changes in dominance. Males, when fighting for dominance, have been observed to target juveniles, sometimes even killing them, and physically injuring older males. For a younger male to take control of a group, he must first kill the dominant male, exhibiting extensive aggression. Females also show aggression when asserting dominance, though this is usually limited to harassment behavior like hair pulling and biting.
