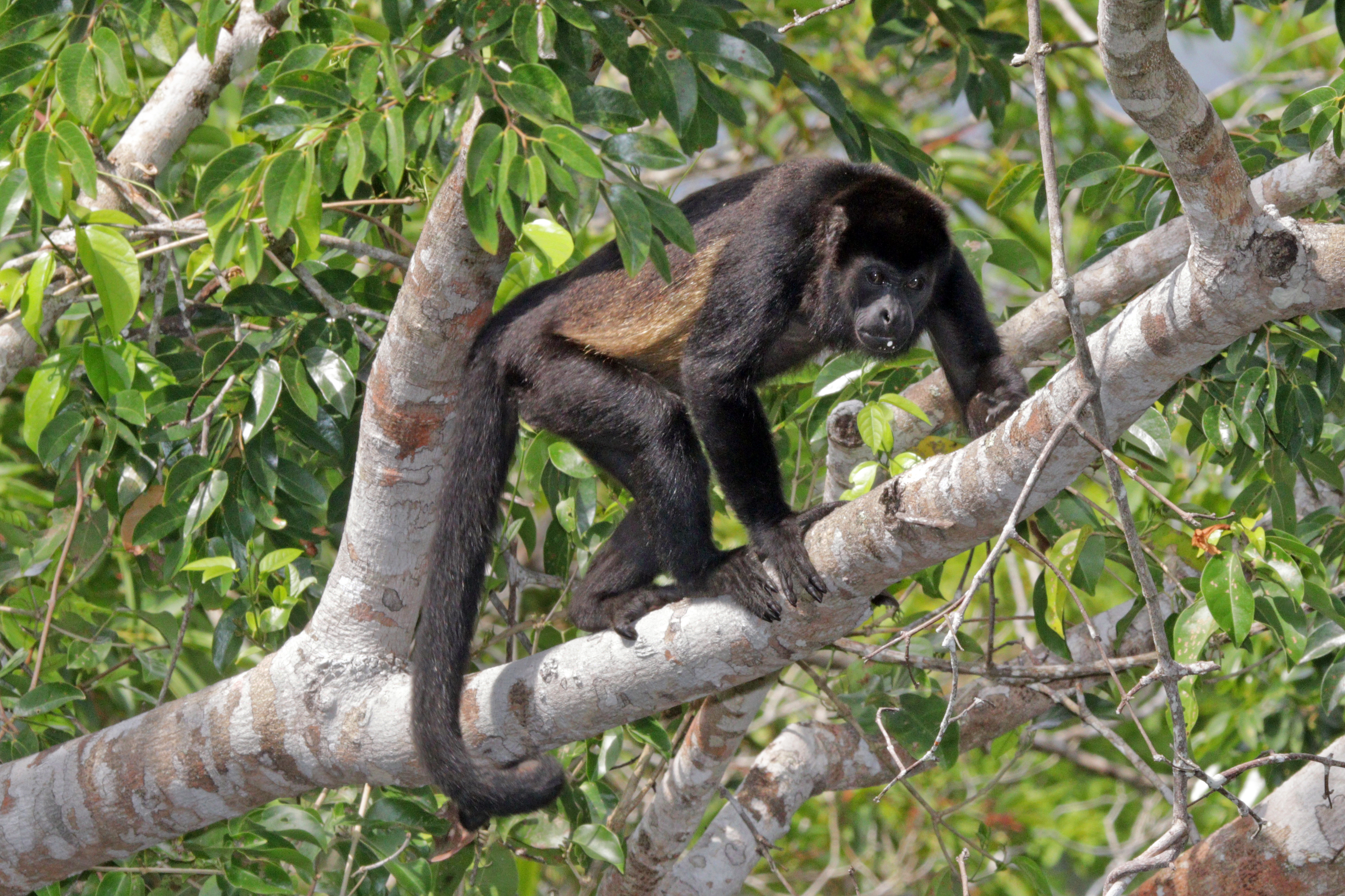
- In Gatun Lake, Panama

Conservation status
- Vulnerable (IUCN 3.1)
- CITES Appendix I (CITES)

Scientific classification
- Kingdom: Animalia
- Phylum: Chordata
- Class: Mammalia
- Order: Primates
- Suborder: Haplorhini
- Infraorder: Simiiformes
- Family: Atelidae
- Genus: Alouatta
- Species: A. palliata
- Subspecies: A. p. aequatorialis

Trinomial name
- Alouatta palliata aequatorialis Festa, 1903

= Ecuadorian mantled howler =

Subspecies of New World monkey

The Ecuadorian mantled howler (Alouatta palliata aequatorialis) is a subspecies of the mantled howler, A. palliata. It ranges from Panama (or possibly the eastern tip of Costa Rica) through Colombia and Ecuador into northern Peru. The range limits between the Ecuadorian mantled howler and the golden-mantled howler are not entirely clear. The Ecuadorian mantled howler replaces the Golden-mantled howler in either extreme eastern Costa Rica or western Panama. The Ecuadorian mantled howler differs from the golden-mantled howler primarily by being paler, with a more yellowish mantle.

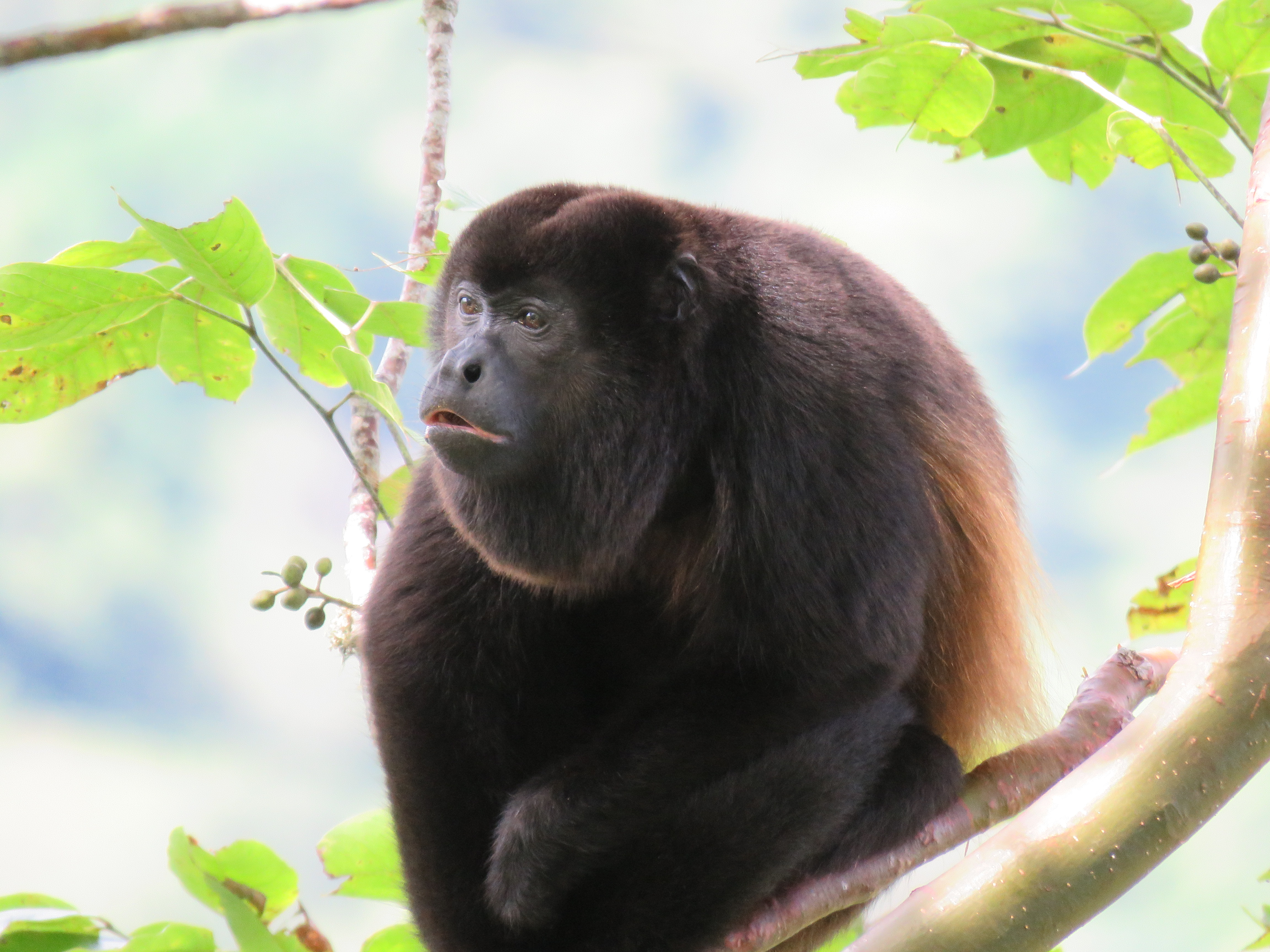
male

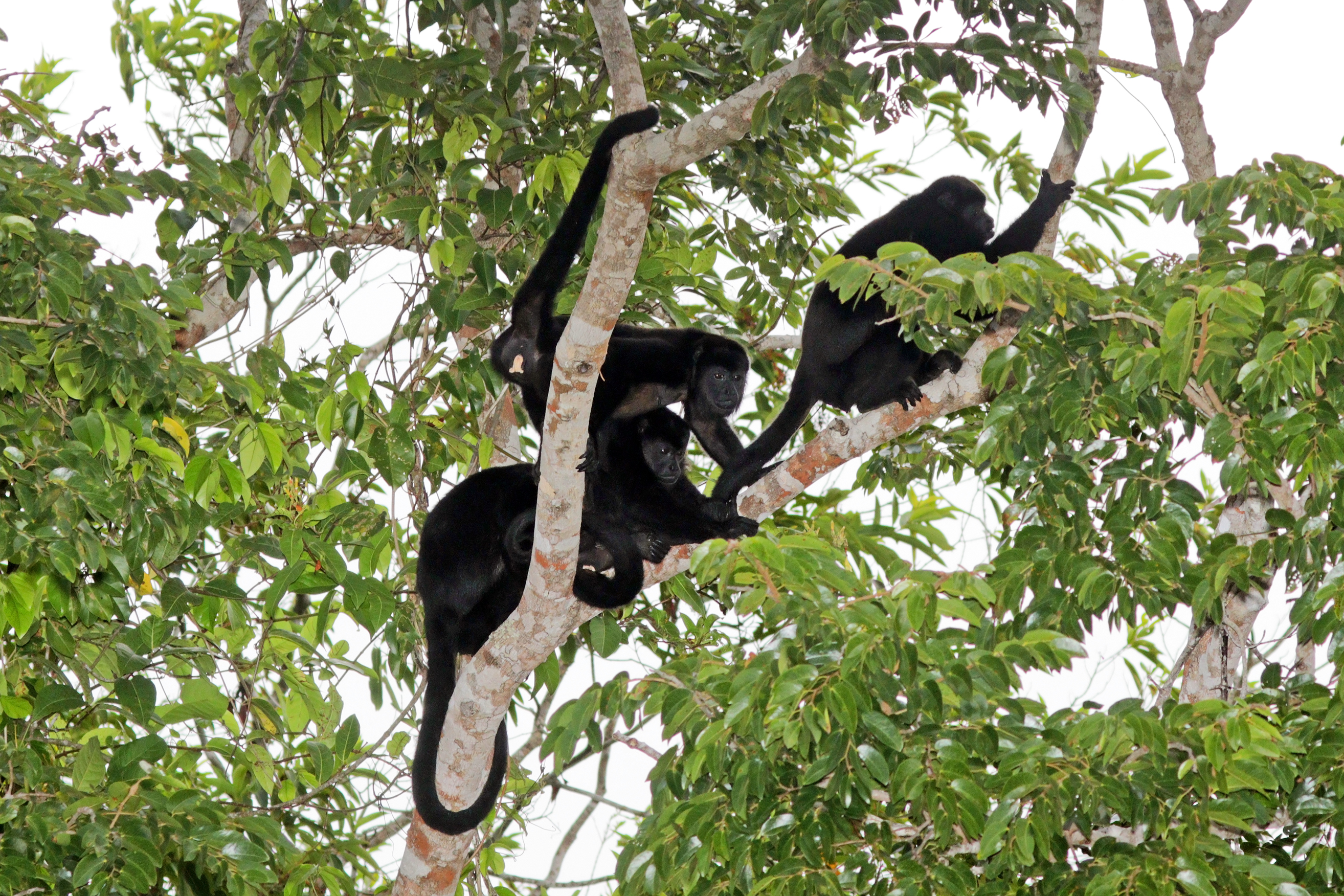
troop

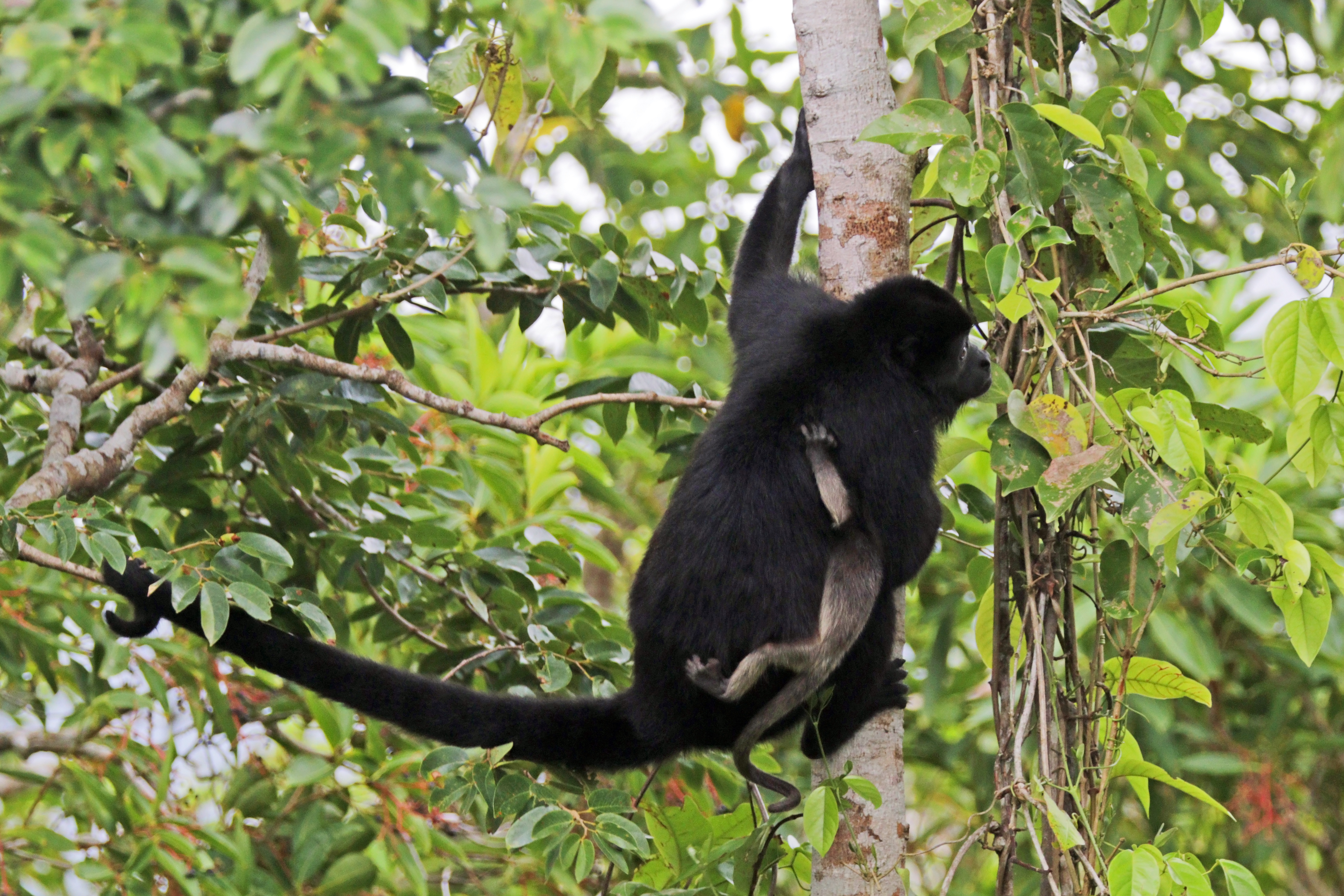
adult with infant

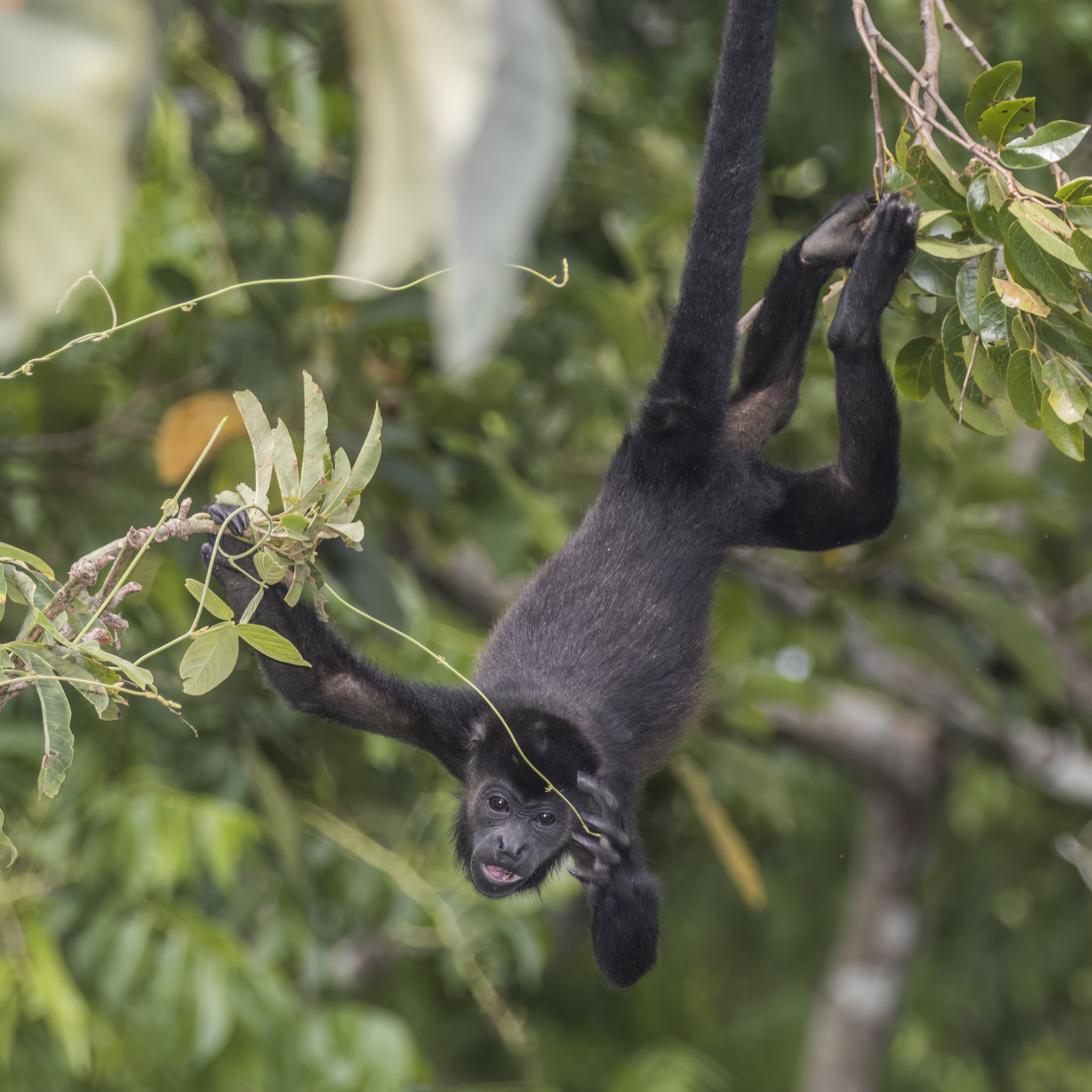
juvenile

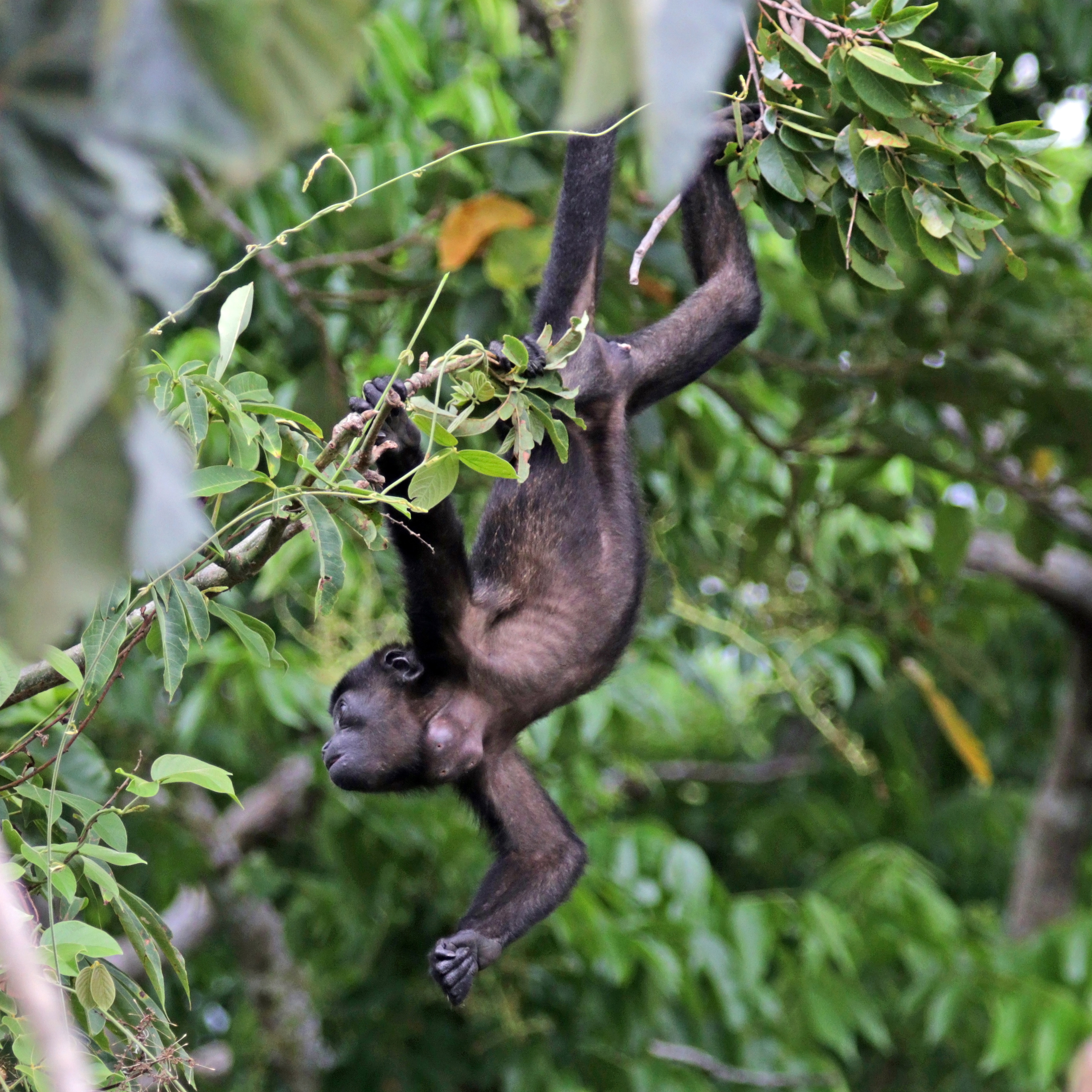
juvenile female with botfly parasite
