= Jordi Sabater Pi =

Spanish primatologist

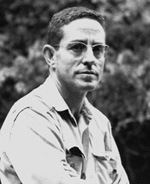
Jordi Sabater Pi

Jordi Sabater Pi (2 August 1922 – 5 August 2009) was a Spanish primatologist and specialist in ethology. Sabater was known for describing the cultural behaviors of several species, including the use of tools by chimpanzees. During the 1960s, he purchased Snowflake, a very rare albino gorilla and transported him to Barcelona Zoo, where he lived until his death in 2003.

Sabater Pi was born in Barcelona, Catalonia, Spain. He was professor of ethology at the Faculty of Psychology at the University of Barcelona and studied animal behaviour and primatology in Spain. His line of work has been continued by several of his disciples, such as Joaquim J. Veà Baró, Matthew Escobar Aliaga, and Montserrat Colell Mimó.

Sabater Pi once said that the decline in population and, in the case of some subspecies, their near extinction, was comparable to genocide among human beings. Sabater Pi advocated for the conservation of primates, supporting projects such as the Proyecto Gran Simio in Spain or Fundación Mona in Girona.

== See also ==
- Nonhuman Rights Project
- Jane Goodall
- USC Jane Goodall Research Center
- Washoe (chimpanzee)
- Joaquim Veà Baró
