= Baro =

Baro or Baró may refer to:

== Places ==
Bangladesh

- Baro Vatra, a village in Gopalganj District

Guinea

- Baro, Guinea

Iran

- Baro, Iran, a village in Zanjan Province

Nigeria

- Baro (Nigeria), a town in Niger state
- Baro-Kano Railway Station

Spain

- Torre Baró, a neighbourhood in Barcelona
- Baró de Viver, a neighbourhood in Barcelona
- Baró (Camaleño)

== People ==
- Baro (entertainer) (born 1992), South Korean idol and member of B1A4
- Baro (surname)
- Baro Urbigerus, seventeenth-century German writer on alchemy

== Clothing ==
Baro means "clothing" in the Tagalog language, and can refer to:

- Baro't saya, the Philippine national dress for women
- Barong tagalog, the Philippine national dress for men
- Maria Clara gown (also called terno), a formal version of the baro't saya

== Other uses ==
- Baro (album), by Habib Koité & Bamada
- Baro (Black Clover), a character in the manga series Black Clover
