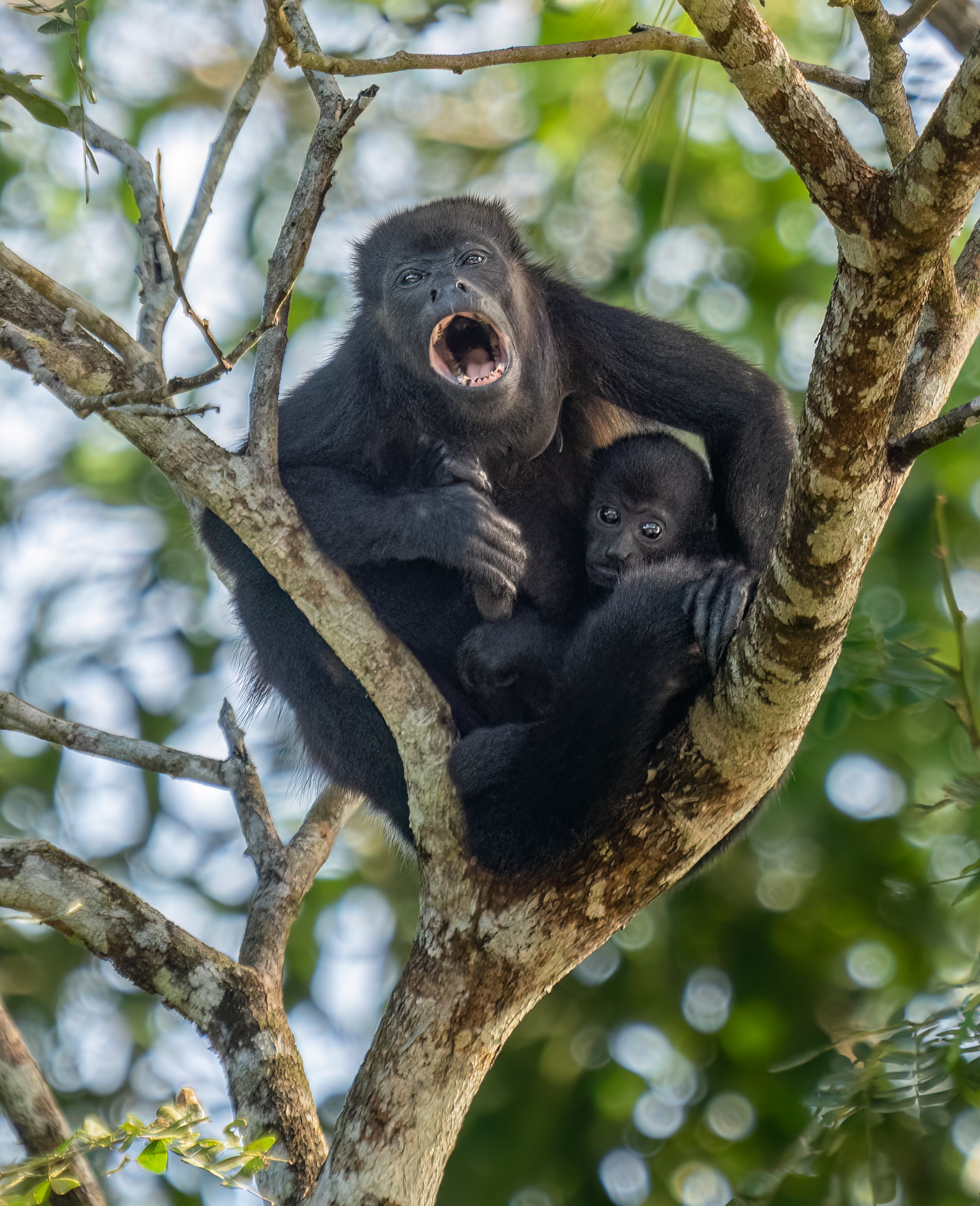

Conservation status
- Least Concern (IUCN 3.1)
- CITES Appendix I

Scientific classification
- Kingdom: Animalia
- Phylum: Chordata
- Class: Mammalia
- Order: Primates
- Family: Atelidae
- Genus: Alouatta
- Species: A. palliata
- Subspecies: A. p. palliata

Trinomial name
- Alouatta palliata palliata Gray, 1849

= Golden-mantled howler =

Subspecies of New World monkey

The golden-mantled howler (Alouatta palliata palliata) is a subspecies of the mantled howler, A. palliata. It ranges throughout much of Central America, in Guatemala, Honduras, Nicaragua and Costa Rica, and possibly Panama. The range limits between the golden-mantled howler and the Ecuadorian mantled howler are not entirely clear. The Ecuadorian mantled howler replaces the golden-mantled howler in either extreme eastern Costa Rica or western Panama.

The golden-mantled howler differs from the Ecuadorian mantled howler primarily by being darker, with a mantle that is more rufous than yellowish. The golden-mantled howler differs from the Mexican howler monkey primarily in aspects of skull morphology.
