= Snowflake (gorilla) =

Only known gorilla with albinism

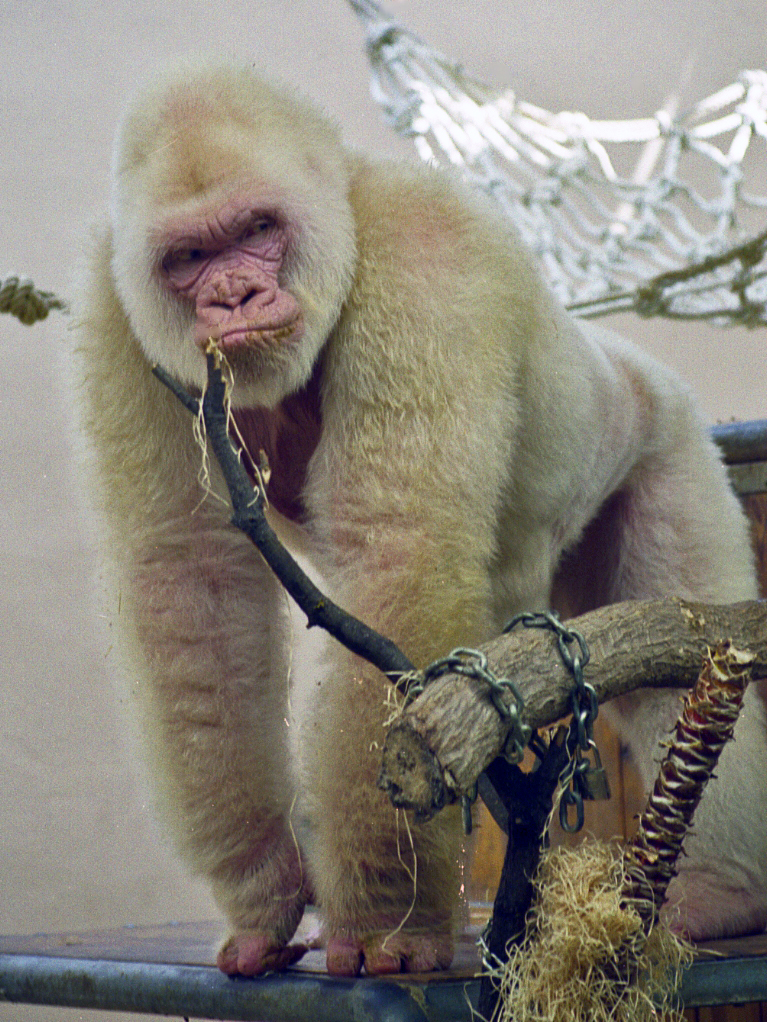
- Snowflake
- Species: Western lowland gorilla
- Sex: Male
- Born: c. 1964; Spanish Guinea
- Died: November 24, 2003 (aged 38–39); Barcelona Zoo, Barcelona, Catalonia, Spain
- Years active: 1966–2003
- Known for: Being the world's only known white gorilla

Snowflake (Catalan: Floquet de Neu, Spanish: Copito de Nieve, French: Flocon de Neige; c. 1964 – 24 November 2003) was a western lowland gorilla who is the world's only known white gorilla to date. He was kept at Barcelona Zoo in Barcelona, Catalonia, Spain, from 1966 until his death in 2003.

== History ==
Snowflake was captured in the Río Muni region in Spanish Guinea on 1 October 1966 by Benito Mañé, a farmer of the Fang people. Mañé had killed the rest of Snowflake's gorilla group, who were all typically colored gorillas. Mañé then kept Snowflake at his home for four days before transporting him to Bata, where he was purchased by primatologist Jordi Sabater Pi.

Originally named Nfumu Ngui in Fang language ("white gorilla") by his captor, he was then nicknamed Floquet de Neu (Catalan for "little snowflake") by his keeper, Jordi Sabater Pi.

== Characteristics ==
Snowflake was a western lowland gorilla with non-syndromic oculocutaneous albinism. He had poor vision, though tests to determine whether he had a central blind spot did not find one. Barcelona Zoo director Antonio Jonch wrote:

"The eye had a blueish sclera, a normal cornea, and a light blue iris which was very transparent to transillumination. Accommodation and refraction were normal. The media were transparent and the fundus of the eye normal and totally depigmented. The choroidal vessels were perfectly visible and the pupil was normal. The animal displayed marked photophobia, which caused it to close its eyes repeatedly when exposed to bright light. In diffuse light similar to that in its biotope, we calculated that it blinked on an average of 20 times a minute."

Study of Snowflake's genome determined that his parents had 12% of their DNA in common, leading researchers to believe that his parents were uncle and niece. The same study revealed that his albinism was caused by a mutation of the SLC45A2 gene. Snowflake received the recessive gene from both parents, causing his albinism.

== Life in Barcelona ==
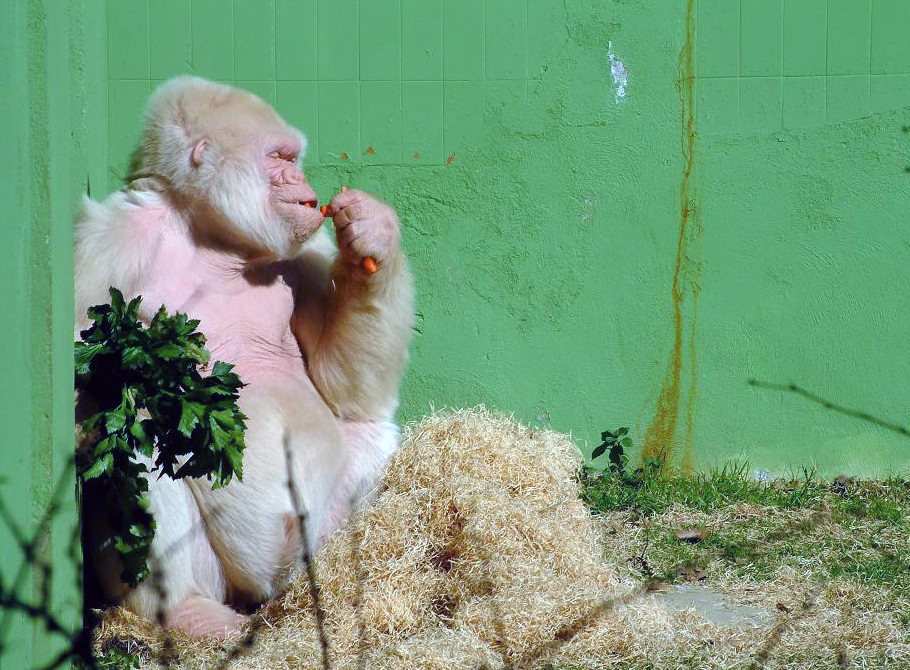
Snowflake resting in his enclosure

Floquet de Neu (August 1993)

Upon his arrival to Barcelona in November 1966, he was given an official reception by the then-mayor of Barcelona, Josep Maria de Porcioles, and called Blancanieves ("Snow White") in the newspaper Tele/Exprés. He became famous, though, with the name given to him by Sabater when National Geographic featured him on the cover in March 1967, with the English name Snowflake. This name spread among the press (Stern, Life, Paris-Match). Sabater himself called the gorilla Copi or Floquet, and in the later years Nfumu.

=== Offspring ===
Snowflake fathered 22 offspring by three different mates, or "dams". Six of his offspring survived to adulthood. None of Snowflake's offspring were albino, but all should be heterozygous, recessive carriers, for the albino gene. Half of his grandchildren likely carry the albino gene. If both parents were albino gene carriers, they have a 25% chance of producing an albino offspring and a 50% chance that the offspring will be a carrier of the gene.

As of September 2021, Snowflake had a total of 21 grandchildren (11 survived) and eight great-grandchildren (all living). Snowflake's great-grandson N'Kou has pink fingers, which is perhaps suggestive of partial albinism.

== Death ==
In 2001, Snowflake was diagnosed with an unusual form of skin cancer, almost certainly related to his albinism. By 2003, Snowflake's health began to deteriorate. After he began losing interest in his usual activities, isolating himself from other gorillas and exhibiting signs of pain, Snowflake's keepers decided to euthanize him. The decision was publicly announced in September 2003. Thousands of people visited Snowflake at the Barcelona Zoo before he was euthanized on 24 November 2003. At the time of his death, Snowflake was thought to be between 38 and 40 years old.

== Legacy ==
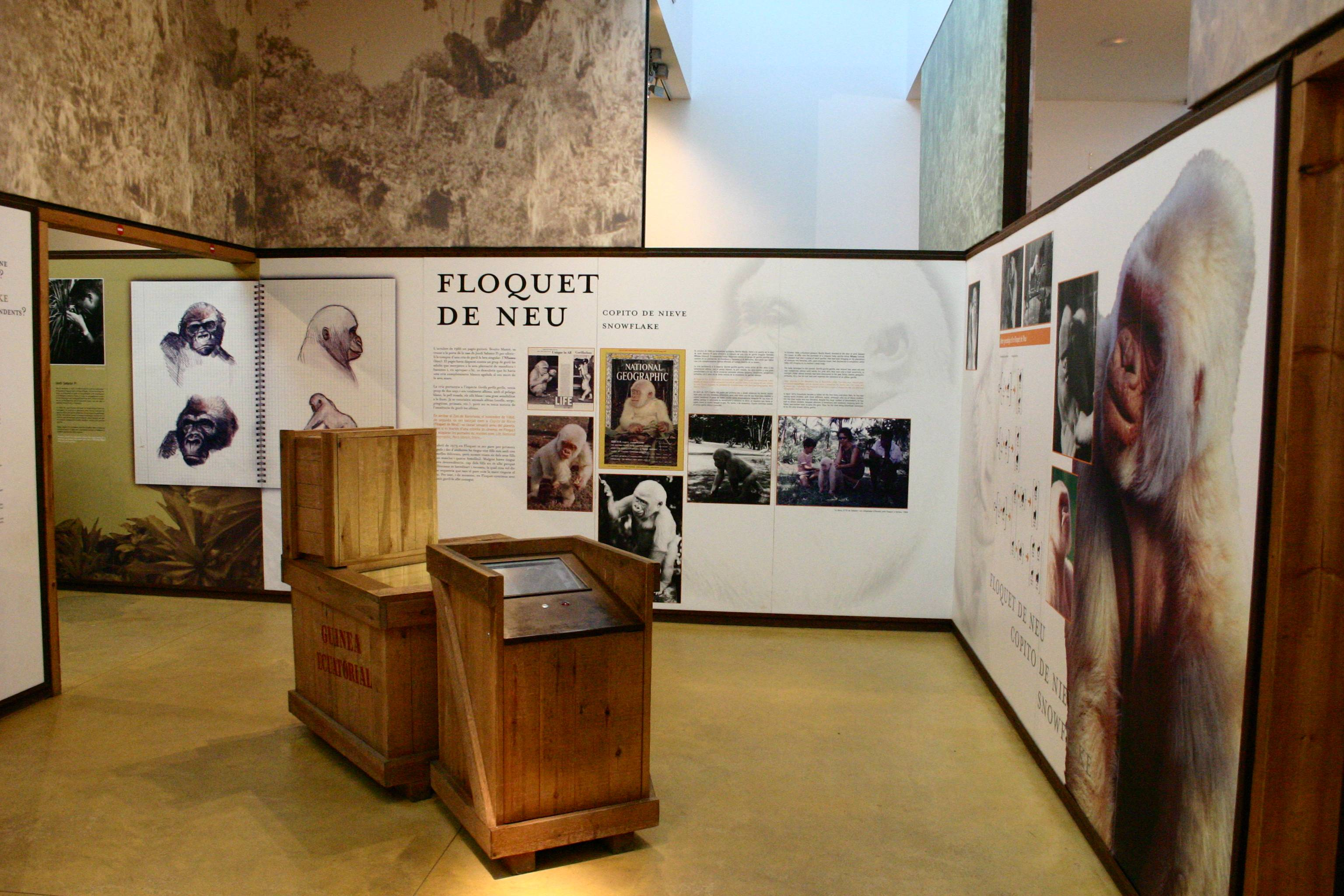
A room dedicated to Snowflake

- The asteroid 95962 Copito, discovered by Spanish astronomer J. Manteca, is named in his honour.
- A scholarship for research on primatology was created in memory of and homage to Snowflake. Snowflake's fame also helped to promote awareness of the endangered gorilla species.
- An illustration and brief description of Snowflake (as of 1969) appears in the Italian children nonfiction book series Guarda e Scopri Gli Animali.
- The gorilla became a main character in the novel Memòries d'en Floquet de Neu ("Snowflake's Memories") by Catalan writer Toni Sala.
- Sabater Pi also dedicated a book to the gorilla, under the title Copito para Siempre (Snowflake Forever).
- He also makes a brief appearance in Italo Calvino's novel Mr. Palomar – the passage is a meditation on loneliness, captivity, the burden of being unique in the world, and mortality.
- Nature on PBS devoted an episode to him.
- Former U.S. Poet Laureate Billy Collins wrote of Snowflake in his poem, "Searching," published in his 2008 collection, Ballistics.
- Snowflake appears on the front cover of dance music act Basement Jaxx's album Rooty.
- While playing at FC Barcelona, Dutch football player Ronald Koeman was nicknamed Copito de Nieve because of his blond hair.
- Snowflake appeared on The Triplets (Les Tres Bessones) episode "The Triplets meet King Kong" as a guest of honor for the appearance of King Kong in Barcelona's Olympic Stadium.
- In 2009 French musician Enzo Enzo released the album Toutim where the song Copito De Nieve De Barcelone is dedicated to Snowflake.
- In 2011, there was a live action/CGI film called Snowflake, the White Gorilla that depicts the fictional childhood of Snowflake (voiced by Kai Stroink in the original Spanish version and by Ariana Grande in the English dub).

== Albino gorillas in other media ==
Other albino (or white-furred) gorillas similar in appearance to Snowflake have appeared in different media.

- Prior to the birth of Snowflake, the film Son of Kong featured King Kong's son, which was a white gorilla that was twice the height of a human and was named "Little Kong".
- In Legends of Chima, the Gorilla Tribe member Grizzam has white fur similar to Snowflake.
- In Black Dynamite, there is a giant white gorilla who is a parody of King Kong named Honky Kong; one character says the ape was previously named Nfumu.
- A white-furred gorilla appears in the French superhero comic series Photonik (featuring in "African Devil"; Volume 1, Mustang #66, 1981), serving as the totem for an evil shaman who wishes to rule all of Africa. As was the case with Snowflake, his entire group is killed by an unscrupulous poacher, and the white gorilla sold into captivity.
- In The Flash, Solovar was depicted as a white gorilla.
- In the Planet of the Apes franchise, a white western lowland gorilla named Winter (voiced and motion-captured by Aleks Paunovic), appears in Caesar's tribe and defected to the Colonel's side out of fear.
- In the 2018 film Rampage (which is based on the video game series of the same name), George (motion-captured by Jason Liles) is white in the movie adaptation to differentiate him from King Kong. Dwayne Johnson stated that George is based on Snowflake.
- In World of Warcraft, Uhk'loc is a rare tamable gorilla NPC with a unique silver/white skin.

== See also ==
- List of individual apes
- Alba (orangutan) – Only known orangutan with albinism
