= Andreu Veà Baró =

Spanish engineer

Andreu Veà i Baró
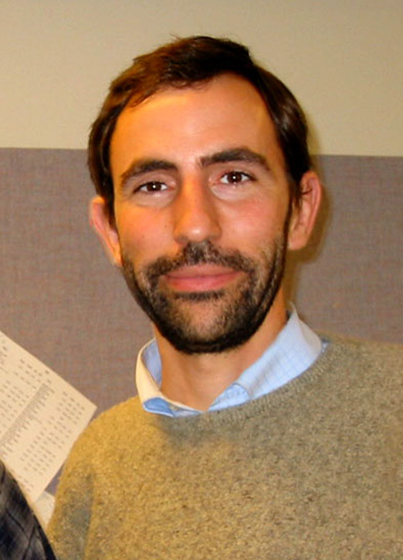
- Veà Baró in 2004
- Born: April 6, 1969 (age 57); Sant Feliu de Guíxols
- Citizenship: Spanish
- Education: Ramon Llull University
- Known for: The Internet Biographer
- Awards: National Award for Personal Career on the Internet (2017) Salvà and Campillo award for outstanding person (2018) Gaudí Gresol Award for Notoriety and Excellence in Technology.(2025)
- Scientific career
- Fields: Telecommunications & Internet
- Workplaces: Stanford University
- Thesis: History, Society, Technology and Network Development. An exposé of the most unknown face of the Internet (2002)
- Doctoral advisor: Jordi Dalmau
- Website: www.comocreamosinternet.com

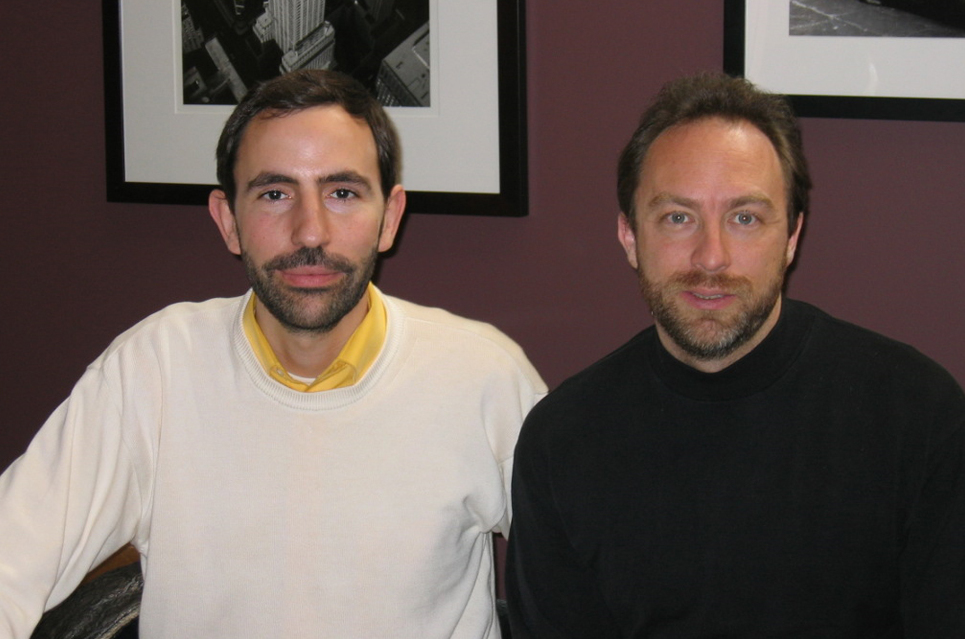
Andreu Veà and Jimbo Wales, co-founder of Wikipedia, in 2006

Andreu Veà interviewing Paul Mockapetris in 2013 (Berlin)

Andreu Veà (born 1969) is a Spanish engineer, president of the Internet Society (ISOC-ES) and member of the advisory board of the Internet Hall of Fame.

He has been appointed as Digital Champion for Spain in late 2014. Digital Champions are ambassadors for the Digital Agenda, appointed by their Members States to help every European become digital and reporting to the VP of the European Commission.

For all his activities, in 2017 he has been awarded with the "National Internet Personal-Trajectory Prize", summoned and failed by the Internet Day Impulse Committee, made up of more than 60 social Spanish organizations led by the Association of Internet Users. The prize is given by the President of the Senate of Spain during the World Internet Day (May 17), at the Spanish Senate Palace.

Born in Sant Feliu de Guíxols (Girona, Spain) in 1969. Telecom Engineer (’91) and Electronic Engineer (’93), Andreu Veà has an MBA in IT Management and a Ph.D. in computer networks ('02). He had his first computer (with 3KB memory) at the age of twelve, and his first international computer network experience dates from 1986. He's brother of the scientist and primatologist Joaquim Veà Baró (1958-2016).

Since 1992, he has had the word Internet on his business card, working in the private sector, in public administration, and at the university, where he has shared his knowledge with several generations of engineers. He discovered the magic power of the net early on, contributing to the local development of the incipient Spanish market in the mid ‘90s, providing first-time connections to many companies and individuals. He co-founded the 4th Spanish Internet service provider (ISP) in 1994.

In early 1998 the new telco Retevision recruited him to launch their own ISP (iddeo). There he designed the technical system that allowed this network operator to offer the first free access to the Internet and a year later the first flat telephone rate in Spain, doubling the base of Internet users in the country in less than a year.

He is a defender of the methods and uses of the Internet, antagonistic to the «classic PTT-telco way». He promoted and presided over ESPANIX (the major Spanish Internet exchange point) and the installation in Madrid and Barcelona of one of the 13 DNS global root servers.

After his doctoral dissertation thesis on the technology, history, and social structure of the Internet (which for 8 years was one of the top 25 most downloaded, 260,000 copies), he was invited by Vint Cerf (one of the “fathers of the Internet”) to continue his original research at Stanford University (California, USA), from which he launched the international research program WiWiW.org.

Nowadays he contributes to the launching and soft-landing of technology-based companies in Silicon Valley. He has been elected as Eminent Expert for Spain on the Grand Jury at the UNESCO’s World Summit Award (Global Awards for mobile apps).

He was the founder and President of the Spanish chapter of the Internet Society (ISOC-ES) between 2009-2017. He was member of the advisory board of the Internet Hall of Fame in 2013.

In 2018 he published «Tecnologia para andar por casa» (in spanish), an informative work to facilitate the "digital life" of the general public.

During the 2019-2020 coronavirus pandemic, he coined and organized the community of COVIDWarriors as an open initiative to shelter all kinds of civil society initiatives in order to alleviate the effects of the pandemic. From the Interesting People community that he leads, it materialized into a non-profit association formed by professional volunteers and proactive organizations, with entrepreneurial talent and technological initiatives, which obtained funding for the fight against COVID-19 through patronage. The initiative was worthy of several awards.

== Published works ==
- Veà Baró, Andreu (2002). Manual pràctic d'Internet a l'empresa (in Catalan). Barcelona: COPCA, Consorci de Promoció Comercial de Catalunya. ISBN 978-84-9313-511-9.
- Veà Baró, Andreu (2005). Qui és qui a Internet?: recull inèdit de fets i anècdotes (in Catalan) (1st. ed.). Barcelona: CIDEM, Centre d'Innovació i Desenvolupament Empresarial. ISBN 978-84-3936-876-2.
- Veà Baró, Andreu (2005). La historia oculta de Intern@t a través de sus personajes (in Spanish). Gijón: Fundación CTIC. ISBN 978-84-609-5566-5..
- Macía Rodríguez, Josep A.; Pardo, Joaquin; Veà Baró, Andreu (2012). !Papá no quiero ir al cole. Me aburro! (in Spanish). Barcelona: Amazon Digital Services, Inc. ASIN B007R59WX2.
- Veà, Andreu (2013). Cómo creamos internet (in Spanish) (1st. ed.). Ediciones Península S.A. ISBN 978-84-9942-275-6.
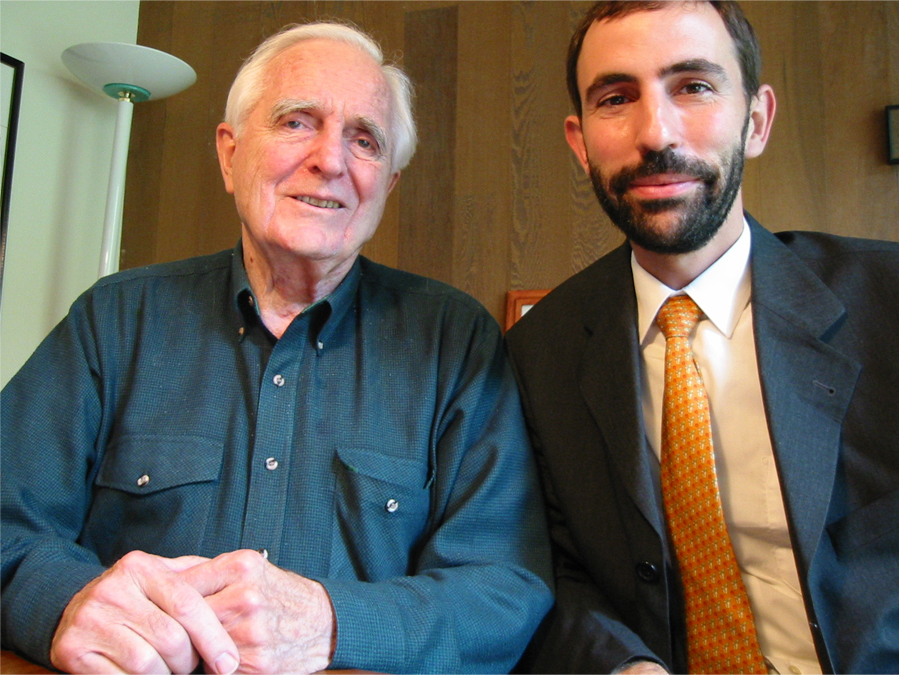
With Douglas Engelbart, inventor of the mouse, in 2003 in Atherton, California

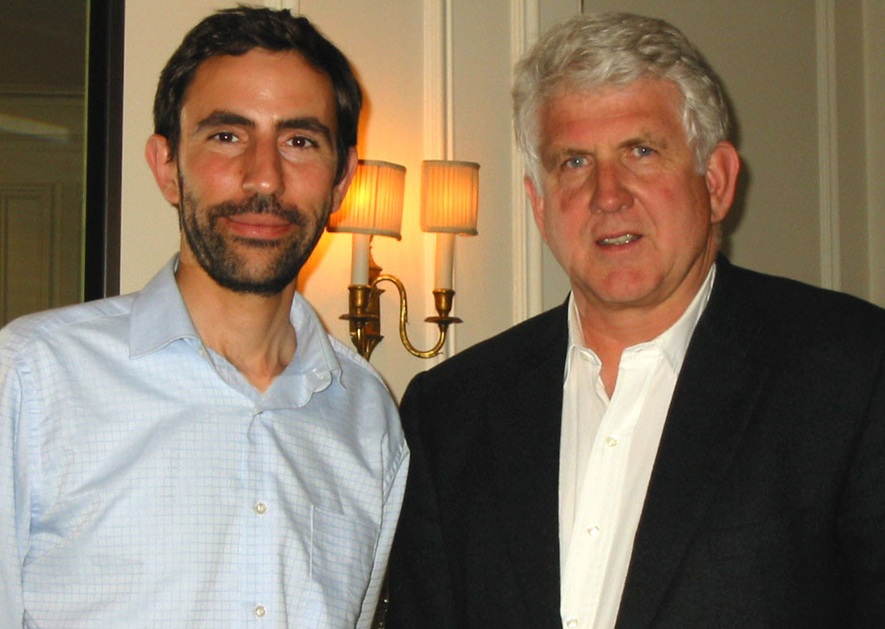
Interview of Robert Metcalfe, inventor of Ethernet, in Boston, Massachusetts

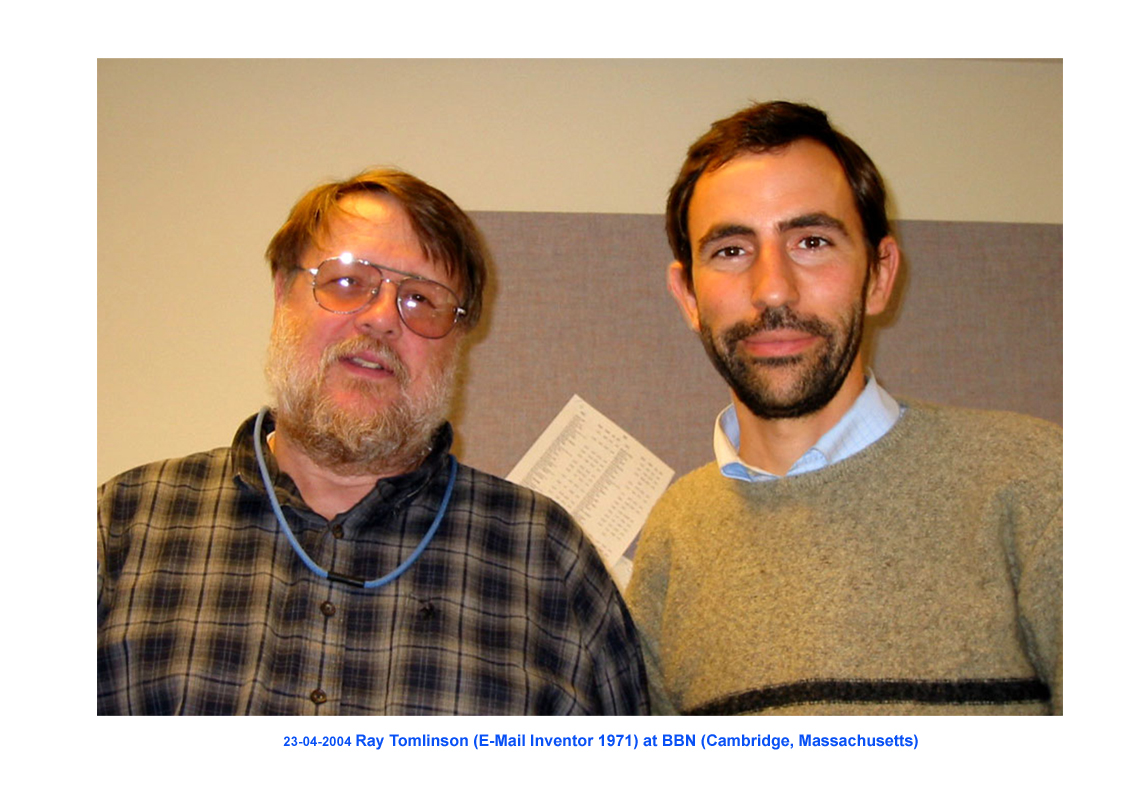
With Ray Tomlinson, who implemented an email system on the ARPANET
