= Canutama Extractive Reserve =

Extractive reserve in Amazonas, Brazil

- Reserva Extrativista Canutama
- IUCN category VI (protected area with sustainable use of natural resources)
- Location within Brazil
- Coordinates: 6.909550°S 64.687958°W
- Area: 197,986 hectares (489,230 acres)
- Designation: Extractive reserve
- Created: 27 March 2009
- Administrator: Secretaria de Estado do Meio Ambiente do Amazonas

The Canutama Extractive Reserve (Portuguese: Reserva Extrativista Canutama) is an extractive reserve in the state of Amazonas, Brazil.

== Location ==
Conservation units in the Purus-Madeira interfluvial.: 6. Canutama Extractive Reserve

The Canutama Extractive Reserve is in the municipality of Canutama, Amazonas. It has an area of 197,986 hectares (489,230 acres). The reserve lies along a stretch of the Purus River between the towns of Lábrea and Canutama. It adjoins the Canutama State Forest to the north and the Balata-Tufari National Forest to the east. The Médio Purus Extractive Reserve is upstream, to the southwest. To the west the reserve is bounded by the Banawá Indigenous Territory. Vegetation is 100% Amazon rainforest. The population of about 200 families includes gatherers, riverine farmers, fishermen and rubber tappers.

== History ==
The Canutama Extractive Reserve was created by Amazonas state decree 28421 of 27 March 2009. The conservation unit was created with five others totalling 23,000 square kilometres (8,900 sq mi) to help meet the requirements for granting an environmental license to reconstruction work on the BR-319 highway that connects Porto Velho to Manaus. The minister of the environment defended implementation of what he called a "green pocket" around the highway. On 16 November 2009 the Instituto Nacional de Colonização e Reforma Agrária (INCRA – National Institute for Colonization and Agrarian Reform) recognised the reserve as supporting 200 families who would be eligible for PRONAF.

The state-level conservation units in the BR-319 corridor are the Piagaçu-Purus, Rio Amapá, Rio Madeira, Igapó-Açu and Matupiri sustainable development reserves, Canutama Extractive Reserve, Canutama State Forest, Tapauá State Forest and Matupiri State Park. In December 2012 the Amazonas state government allocated more than R$6 million to these nine units, covering 30,000 square kilometres (12,000 sq mi) and 143 communities, to be coordinated by the State Center for Conservation Units (CEUC). The funding was for development of management plans, creation of management councils, environmental monitoring, land survey, and production and marketing.

The management plan was approved on 22 July 2014. As of 2016 the reserve was supported by the Amazon Region Protected Areas Program.

== Sources ==
- Full list: PAs supported by ARPA, ARPA
- RESEX Canutama (in Portuguese), ISA: Instituto Socioambiental
- Unidades de Conservação estaduais da BR-319 recebem incentivo de R$ 6 milhões para implementação, Amazonas State Government, 26 December 2012
