= Rio Amapá Sustainable Development Reserve =

Protected area in Amazonas, Brazil

- Reserva de Desenvolvimento Sustentável do Rio Amapá
- IUCN category VI (protected area with sustainable use of natural resources)
- Location within Brazil
- Nearest city: Manicoré, Amazonas
- Coordinates: 5°31′03″S 61°46′52″W
- Area: 216,109 hectares (534,020 acres)
- Designation: Sustainable development reserve
- Created: 1 June 2005

The Rio Amapá Sustainable Development Reserve (Portuguese: Reserva de Desenvolvimento Sustentável do Rio Amapá) is a sustainable development reserve in the state of Amazonas, Brazil.

== Location ==
Conservation units in the Purus-Madeira interfluvial.: 15. Rio Amapá Sustainable Development Reserve

The Rio Amapá Sustainable Development Reserve is in the municipality of Manicoré, Amazonas. It has an area of 216,109 hectares (534,020 acres). The BR-319 highway runs along the northwest border, and the AM-464 highway runs along the northeast border. To the northeast the reserve adjoins the Matupiri State Park on the other side of AM-464. The Madeira River flows some distance from the southeast border of the reserve. To the southwest it adjoins the Lago do Capanã Grande Extractive Reserve. The Nascentes do Lago Jari National Park and the Igapó-Açu Sustainable Development Reserve are on the opposite side of the BR-319 highway.

== Environment ==
The reserve is in the region between the Madeira and Purus rivers in an area drained by the Amapá and Jutaí rivers. The two rivers flow through the reserve from southwest to northeast. The Matupiri River forms in the reserve where the Jutaí and Novo rivers converge. The reserve is subject to seasonal floods. Vegetation includes terra firma forest with many Brazil nut trees, igapó, campina and campinarana. It is part of a complex of isolated savanna areas with high levels of endemic species, as well as species typical of the cerrado and the Amazona campina.

There is high biodiversity. Some species such as Roosmalen's dwarf porcupine (Sphiggurus roosmalenorum) are unique to the region. The rare Allobates caeruleodactylus frog is found in the reserve. Over 200 birds species have been recorded including four new species of the genera Leucopternis, Herpsilochmus, Hemitriccus and Cyanocorax. Traces of mammals such as the South American tapir (Tapirus terrestris), jaguar (Panthera onca) and cougar (Puma concolor) have been found, indicating that the environment is healthy. Large numbers of giant otters (Pteronura brasiliensis) are present in the Amapá River.

== Economy ==
There are no permanent residents in the reserve, but some families occupy the area seasonally to harvest Brazil nuts. There is high potential for scientific, ecological, educational and bird watching tourism. As of 2010 the reserve was used by 305 families with about 1,328 people in 19 communities. They are represented by the Central das Associações Agroestrativistas de Democracia (CAAD), which covers communities around the Madeira River and the AM-464 highway. By 2010 the Bolsa Floresta program was providing support to families using the reserve in exchange for commitment to conservation. As of 2016 the reserve was receiving support from the Amazon Region Protected Areas Program.

There has been some conflict with indigenous people of the Terra Preta community, who claim part of the reserve should be recognized as indigenous territory and at times have barred entry of others into the reserve.

== History ==
The Rio Amapá Sustainable Development Reserve was created by Amazonas decree 25.041 of 1 June 2005 with the objectives of preserving nature and ensuring the means and conditions for assuring and improving the quality of life of the traditional extractive population. At time of creation most of the land in the reserve was state property or untitled land, although there were four private properties that extended into about 10,585 hectares (26,160 acres) of the reserve. On 19 October 2005 the Instituto Nacional de Colonização e Reforma Agrária (INCRA – National Institute for Colonisation and Agrarian Reform) recognised the reserve as meeting the need of 300 families of small rural producers, who would qualify for PRONAF support. The deliberative council was created on 4 September 2007, and the management plan approved on 27 September 2010.

The state-level conservation units in the BR-319 corridor are the Piagaçu-Purus, Rio Amapá, Rio Madeira, Igapó-Açu and Matupiri sustainable development reserves, Canutama Extractive Reserve, Canutama State Forest, Tapauá State Forest and Matupiri State Park. In December 2012 the Amazonas state government allocated more than R$6 million to these nine units, covering 30,000 square kilometres (12,000 sq mi) and 143 communities, to be coordinated by the State Center for Conservation Units (CEUC). The funding was for development of management plans, creation of management councils, environmental monitoring, land survey, and production and marketing.

== Sources ==
- Costa, Sandra Regina da (March 2010), Plano de Gestão da Reserva de Desenvolvimento Sustentável do Rio Amapá (PDF) (in Portuguese), Manicoré - Amazonas: CEUC
- Full list: PAs supported by ARPA, ARPA
- RDS do Rio Amapá (in Portuguese), ISA: Instituto Socioambiental
- Unidades de Conservação estaduais da BR-319 recebem incentivo de R$ 6 milhões para implementação, Amazonas State Government, 26 December 2012
- Virgilio M. Viana (December 2008), "Bolsa Floresta (Forest Conservation Allowance): An innovative mechanism to promote health in traditional communities in the Amazon" (PDF), Estud. Av., 22 (64), São Paulo, ISSN 1806-9592
