= Canutama State Forest =

State forest in Amazonas, Brazil

- Floresta Estadual Canutama
- Location within Brazil
- Nearest city: Canutama, Amazonas
- Coordinates: 6.313760°S 64.428980°W
- Area: 150,588 hectares (372,110 acres)
- Designation: State forest
- Created: 27 March 2009
- Administrator: Secretaria de Estado do Meio Ambiente do Amazonas

The Canutama State Forest (Portuguese: Floresta Estadual Canutama) is a state forest in the state of Amazonas, Brazil.

== Location ==
Conservation units in the Purus-Madeira interfluvial.: 7. Canutama State Forest

The Canutama State Forest is divided between the municipalities of Tapauá (6.65%) and Canutama (93.35%) in the state of Amazonas. It has an area of 150,588 hectares (372,110 acres). The state forest lies on the left (west) bank of the Purus River between the towns of Canatuma and Nova Ação. It adjoins the Canutama Extractive Reserve to the south. The vegetation is 100% dense rainforest.

== History ==
The Canutama State Forest was created by decree 28422 of 27 March 2009 with the objective of promoting and managing multiple sustainable uses of forest resources, and scientific research with emphasis on methods of sustainable exploitation of native forests. The conservation unit was created with five others totalling 23,000 square kilometres (8,900 sq mi) to help meet the requirements for granting an environmental license to reconstruction work on the BR-319 highway that connects Porto Velho to Manaus. The minister of the environment defended implementation of what he called a "green pocket" around the highway. On 16 November 2009 the forest was recognised as supporting 200 families of small rural producers, who would be eligible for PRONAF. The management plan was approved on 22 July 2014.

The state-level conservation units in the BR-319 corridor are the Piagaçu-Purus, Rio Amapá, Rio Madeira, Igapó-Açu and Matupiri sustainable development reserves, Canutama Extractive Reserve, Canutama State Forest, Tapauá State Forest and Matupiri State Park. In December 2012 the Amazonas state government allocated more than R$6 million to these nine units, covering 30,000 square kilometres (12,000 sq mi) and 143 communities, to be coordinated by the State Center for Conservation Units (CEUC). The funding was for development of management plans, creation of management councils, environmental monitoring, land survey, and production and marketing.

== Sources ==
- FES Canutama (in Portuguese), ISA: Instituto Socioambiental
- Unidades de Conservação estaduais da BR-319 recebem incentivo de R$ 6 milhões para implementação, Amazonas State Government, 26 December 2012
