= Igapó-Açu Sustainable Development Reserve =

Sustainable development reserve in the state of Amazonas, Brazil

- Reserva de Desenvolvimento Sustentável Igapó-Açu
- IUCN category VI (protected area with sustainable use of natural resources)
- Location within Brazil
- Nearest city: Beruri, Amazonas
- Coordinates: 4.973374°S 61.552647°W
- Area: 397,557 hectares (982,380 acres)
- Designation: Sustainable development reserve
- Created: 27 March 2009
- Administrator: Secretaria de Estado do Meio Ambiente do Amazonas

The Igapó-Açu Sustainable Development Reserve (Portuguese: Reserva de Desenvolvimento Sustentável Igapó-Açu) is a sustainable development reserve in the state of Amazonas, Brazil. It is part of a "green barrier" created to prevent deforestation along the BR-319 highway.

== Location ==
Conservation units in the Purus-Madeira interfluvial.: 13. Igapó-Açu Sustainable Development Reserve

The Igapó-Açu Sustainable Development Reserve is divided between the municipalities of Manicoré (21.9%), Borba (21%) and Beruri (57.1%) in the state of Amazonas. It has an area of 397,557 hectares (982,380 acres). The reserve covers a corridor of land along both sides of a stretch of the BR-319 highway. The Matupiri State Park adjoins it to the south. In the southeast it adjoins the Rio Amapá Sustainable Development Reserve and the Nascentes do Lago Jari National Park. The vegetation is mainly Amazon rainforest. The residents are mainly farmers, either leaseholders or small landowners.

== History ==
The Igapó-Açu Sustainable Development Reserve was created by Amazonas state decree 28420 of 27 March 2009. The conservation unit, and five others, were formed as part of a plan to form a "green barrier" along the BR-319 highway, which links Porto Velho to Manaus, so as to contain the advance of agriculture and predatory extraction of natural resources in the south of Amazonas. On 16 November 2009 the Instituto Nacional de Colonização e Reforma Agrária (INCRA – National Institute for Colonization and Agrarian Reform) recognised the reserve as supporting 200 families, who would qualify for PRONAF support.

The state-level conservation units in the BR-319 corridor are the Piagaçu-Purus, Rio Amapá, Rio Madeira, Igapó-Açu and Matupiri sustainable development reserves, Canutama Extractive Reserve, Canutama State Forest, Tapauá State Forest and Matupiri State Park. In December 2012 the Amazonas state government allocated more than R$6 million to these nine units, covering 30,000 square kilometres (12,000 sq mi) and 143 communities, to be coordinated by the State Center for Conservation Units (CEUC). The funding was for development of management plans, creation of management councils, environmental monitoring, land survey, and production and marketing.

The management plan for the Igapó-Açu Sustainable Development Reserve was approved on 22 July 2014. As of 2016 the reserve was supported by the Amazon Region Protected Areas Program.

== Sources ==
- Full list: PAs supported by ARPA, ARPA
- RDS Igapó-Açu (in Portuguese), ISA: Instituto Socioambiental
- Unidades de Conservação estaduais da BR-319 recebem incentivo de R$ 6 milhões para implementação, Amazonas State Government, 26 December 2012, archived from the original on September 11, 2016
