= RBB =

RBB or rbb may refer to:

== Banking ==
- Rastriya Banijya Bank, the largest commercial bank in Nepal
- Westpac Retail and Business Banking, a business unit of Australian bank Westpac

== Broadcasting ==
- Rundfunk Berlin-Brandenburg, a national broadcaster for the German states of Berlin and Brandenburg
- Radio Broadcasting Board, precursor to the Philippine Broadcasting Service

== Music ==
- RBB (EP), a 2018 EP by South Korean girl group Red Velvet
  - "RBB (Really Bad Boy)", song from that EP

== Sports ==
- Real Betis Balompié, a Spanish football club
- Red Bull Barako (later Barako Bull Energy Boosters), a Philippine professional basketball team
- Red Bull Brasil, a Brazilian football club located in Campinas, São Paulo
- Red and Black Bloc, supporters of Western Sydney Wanderers FC

== Transport ==
- Rigid buoyant boat, a type of light-weight boat
- Rügensche Bäderbahn, a narrow gauge railway in Mecklenburg-Vorpommern, Germany
- Borba Airport, Borba, Amazonas, Brazil (IATA code RBB)

== Other uses ==
- RBB, another name for the NACC2 gene, which encodes a BEN domain protein
- RB Battles, a series of events on the platform, Roblox
- Richard Boyd Barrett (born 1967), Irish politician
- Richland-Bean Blossom Community School Corporation, in Monroe County, Indiana, US
- Rock Band Blitz, a video game released in 2012
- Rumai dialect of the Palaung language (ISO code rbb)

== See also ==
- RBBS (disambiguation)
