= Maués State Forest =

State forest in Amazonas, Brazil

- Floresta Estadual de Maués
- Location within Brazil
- Nearest city: Maués, Amazonas.
- Coordinates: 4°02′26″S 57°54′29″W
- Area: 438,440 hectares (1,083,400 acres)
- Designation: State forest
- Created: 19 July 2003
- Administrator: Secretaria de Estado do Meio Ambiente do Amazonas

The Maués State Forest (Portuguese: Floresta Estadual de Maués) is a state forest in the state of Amazonas, Brazil.

== Location ==
The Maués State Forest is in the municipality of Maués, Amazonas. It has an area of 438,440 hectares (1,083,400 acres). The reserve would be included in the proposed South Amazon Ecological Corridor. The forest is in the region between the Madeira and Tapajós rivers. It is bounded by the Apocuitaua, Pacoval and Parauari rivers. The forest adjoins the Pau-Rosa National Forest to the south.

The climate is hot and humid, typical of the Amazon. Rains are abundant, with more rainfall from January to July and less from August to December. The vegetation is mostly terra firma forest, but there are also areas of igapó, restinga and campina. Timber species include Aniba roseodora, Manilkara huberi, Hymenaea courbaril, Tabebuia species including Tabebuia impetiginosa and Tabebuia chysotricha, Licaria brasiliensis, Ficus species, Brosimum paraense and Astronium lecoientei. There are many species of fish, and a great many bird species. Primates include at least one endemic species, the Maués marmoset (Mico mauesi).

== Economy ==
In 2010 there were 420 families in 14 communities in the forest, and 7 communities in the surrounding region. The communities are distributed along the Igarapé Pacoval in the west, the Apoquitauá River and the Parauari River to the east. 10,700.7 hectares (26,442 acres) of land in the forest are used by the communities. As of 2004 there were 462 agricultural areas, with cassava grown in 51.08% and guarana in 43.29%. Between 2004 and 2010 there seems to have been a reduction of 29.8% in the area cultivated.

The main commercial crop is guaranaá (Paullinia cupana). The communities also engage in subsistence farming, mainly cassava. There is some animal husbandry, mostly pigs and birds. There is abundant fish. Extracted products include wood and turtle eggs, as well as honey and the oils of andiroba and copaíba among others. Native fruit trees are cultivated. The communities receive support from the Bolsa Floresta program.

== History ==
The municipality of Maués began studies on creation of a municipal forest in 2002. In 2003 responsibility was transferred to the state environmental department. The Maués State Forest was created by decree 23.540 of 19 July 2003. On 28 November 2005 the forest was recognized by the Instituto Nacional de Colonização e Reforma Agrária (INCRA – National Institute for Colonization and Agrarian Reform) as supporting 300 families of small rurals producers, who would be eligible for PRONAF support. This was adjusted to 620 families on 1 June 2009. The consultative council was created on 26 January 2010. The management plan was approved on 25 April 2012.

== Sources ==
- Ayres, José Márcio; Da Fonseca, Gustavo A. B.; Rylands, Anthony B.; Queiroz, Helder L.; Pinto, Luiz Paulo; Masterson, Donald; Cavalcanti, Roberto B. (2005), Os Corredores Ecológicos das Florestas Tropicais do Brasil (PDF) (in Portuguese), Sociedade Civil Mamirauá, archived from the original (PDF) on 2016-07-31
- FES de Maués (in Portuguese), ISA: Instituto Socioambiental
- Floresta Estadual de Maues recebe beneficios do Programa Bolsa Floresta, FAS: Fundacao Amazonas Sustentavel, 30 June 2011
- Koury, Carlos Gabriel; Freitas, Camila Carla de; Rizzo, Eduardo (March 2010), Mapeamento Participativo do Uso dos Recursos Naturais da Floresta Estadual de Maués (PDF) (in Portuguese), Maués – Amazonas: IDESAM: Instituto de Conservação e Desenvolvimento Sustentável do Amazonas
