= Uacari Sustainable Development Reserve =

Protected area in Amazonas, Brazil

- Reserva de Desenvolvimento Sustentável de Uacari
- IUCN category VI (protected area with sustainable use of natural resources)
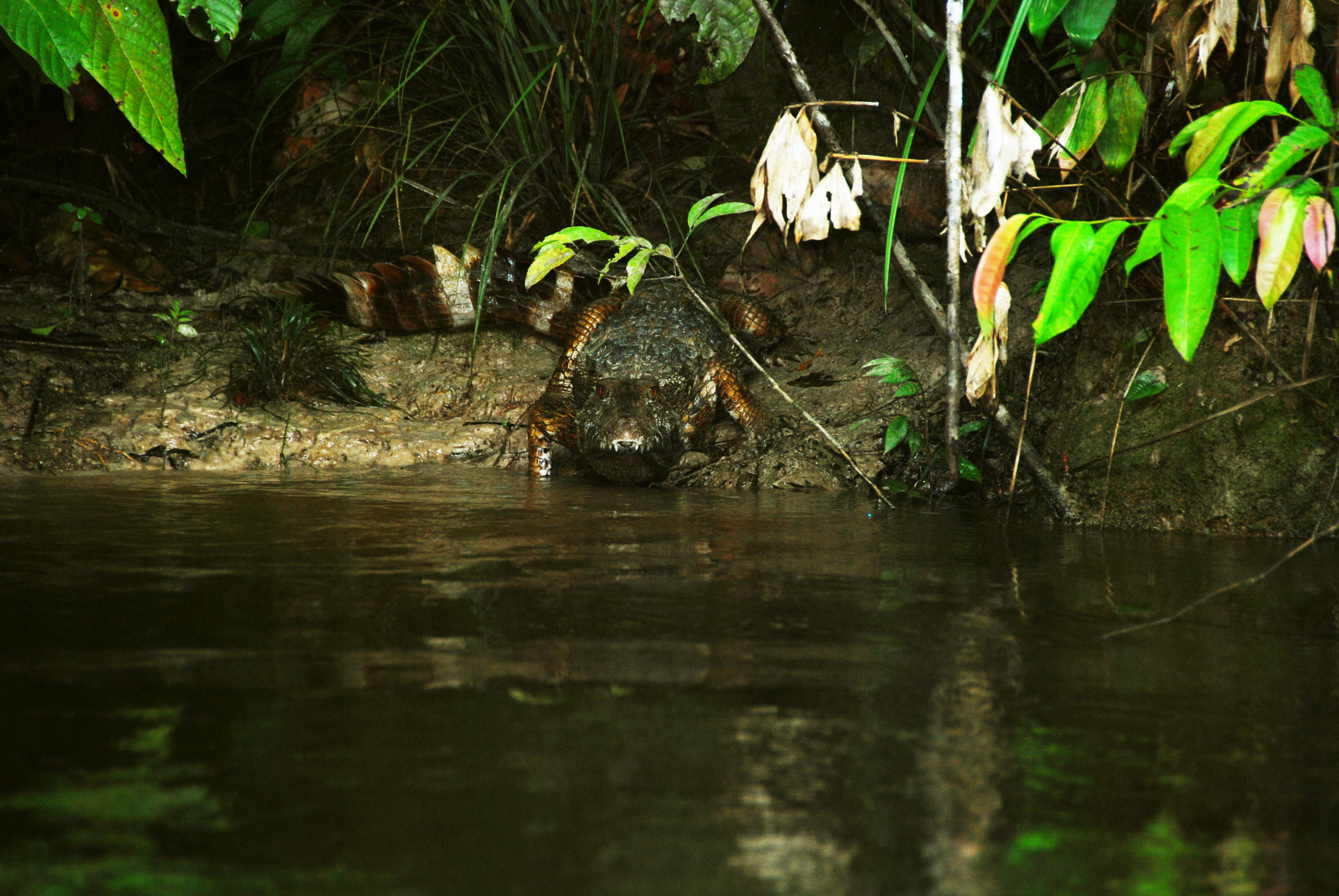
- Smooth-fronted caiman (Paleosuchus trigonatus) in the reserve

- Location within Brazil
- Nearest city: Carauari, Amazonas
- Coordinates: 5.768701°S 67.640978°W
- Area: 632,949 hectares (1,564,050 acres)
- Designation: Sustainable development reserve
- Created: 1 June 2005
- Administrator: Secretaria de Estado do Meio Ambiente do Amazonas

The Uacari Sustainable Development Reserve (Portuguese: Reserva de Desenvolvimento Sustentável de Uacari) is a sustainable development reserve in the state of Amazonas, Brazil. As of 2011 the reserve supported about 265 traditional extractive families.

== Location ==
The Uacari Sustainable Development Reserve is in the municipality of Carauari, Amazonas. It has an area of 632,949 hectares (1,564,050 acres). The Rio Biá Indigenous Territory lies to the north of the western part of the reserve. The Deni IndigenousTerritory is to the south. The Juruá River flows through the western part of the reserve from south to north, and forms the northern boundary of the eastern part, dividing it from the Médio Juruá Extractive Reserve. It takes seven days to reach the reserve by boat from Manaus.

The environment includes terra firma rainforest, várzea forest, small hills, campina and flooded land with grass and dead trees, small islands, lakes and streams. There are at least 19 species of primate, including the threatened bald uakari (Cacajao calvus). There are many turtles, a great many fish, a large population of alligators and at least 30 species of medium and large mammals. As of 2007 there were 29 communities in the reserve.

== History ==
The Uacari Sustainable Development Reserve was created by Amazonas state governor decree 25.039 of 1 June 2005 with the objectives of conserving nature and ensuring the conditions needed to sustain and improve the quality of life of the traditional extractive population. It became part of the Central Amazon Ecological Corridor, established in 2002. On 17 October 2005 the Instituto Nacional de Colonização e Reforma Agrária (INCRA – National Institute for Colonization and Agrarian Reform) recognised the reserve as meeting the needs of 200 families of small rural producers, who would qualify for PRONAF support. The deliberative council was created on 25 February 2008. The management plan was approved on 8 June 2008.

The reserve was covered by the Bolsa Floresta program by the end of 2008. In 2011 FAS and HRT Oil & Gas signed a partnership for investment in the reserve of R$4 million to be used for Bolsa Floresta and support programs. Funding would be directed to sustainable production, education and health of the extractive population of the reserve. In 2013 Bolsa Floresta Familiar support was going to 1,353 people in 265 families living in 30 communities.

A pioneering program on sustainable production in protected areas was launched in the reserve on 14 September 2013. The course consists of over a thousand hours of classes focused on the main products with economic potential in the Middle Juruá region such as rubber, flour, wood, andiroba oils, arapaima, liana-titica, turtles and alligators. Students prepare business plans at the end of the course for harvesting, processing and marketing the various types of product. The course was given at the Bauana Centre for Conservation and Support for Sustainable Entrepreneurship, built in 2011 on the right bank of the Juruá through the partnership between FAS and HRT Oil & Gas. The centre has two classrooms and a modern laboratory with computers connected to the internet.

As of 2016 the reserve was supported by the Amazon Region Protected Areas Program.

== Sources ==
- CEC Central da Amazônia (in Portuguese), ISA: Instituto Socioambiental
- Full list: PAs supported by ARPA, ARPA
- RDS de Uacari (in Portuguese), ISA: Instituto Socioambiental
- RDS Uacari ganha Núcleo de Conservação e apoio ao Empreendedorismo Sustentável (in Portuguese), FAS: Fundação Amazonas Sustentável, 16 September 2013, archived from the original on 2016-09-14
- Relatorio de Atividades 2012 (PDF) (in Portuguese), FAS: Fundação Amazonas Sustentável, archived from the original (PDF) on 2015-05-30
- Virgilio M. Viana (December 2008), "Bolsa Floresta (Forest Conservation Allowance): An innovative mechanism to promote health in traditional communities in the Amazon" (PDF), Estud. Av., 22 (64), São Paulo, ISSN 1806-9592
