= Alto Maués Ecological Station =

- Estação Ecológica Alto Maués
- IUCN category Ia (strict nature reserve)
- Location within Brazil
- Nearest city: Itaituba, Pará
- Coordinates: 5.662°S 58.141°W
- Area: 665,673.53 hectares (1,644,915.1 acres)
- Designation: Ecological station
- Created: 16 October 2014
- Administrator: ICMBio

Alto Maués Ecological Station (Portuguese: Estação Ecológica Alto Maués) is an ecological station, a fully protected area, in the state of Amazonas, Brazil. It contains about 6,656 square kilometres (2,570 sq mi) of Amazon rainforest.

== Location ==
The Alto Maués Ecological Station is in the municipality of Maués, Amazonas. It covers 665,673.53 hectares (1,644,915.1 acres) of Amazon rainforest. The terrain is relatively smooth with corrugated undulations and long, open V-shaped valleys. The Alto Maués conservation unit is bordered to the north west by the Pau-Rosa National Forest, and to the east by the Amanã National Forest in Pará. The Abacaxis River forms its western boundary. The Parauari River flows through the eastern part of the unit. The Urupadi National Forest borders the south of the unit.

The unit is between the basins of the Madeira and Tapajós rivers, and holds many lakes, ponds and streams. The Abacaxis River in the west of the unit has the Curauari, Caramuri and Paracati as tributaries. The Maués Açu basin in the centre of the unit contains the Maués-Mirim, Urupadi, Andirá, Abacaxis, Paraconi, Arari, Apoquitaua, Pupunham, Parauari and Amanã rivers. The Maués Açu forms where the Amanã and Parauari combine, and in turn joins the Paraná do Urariá in the seat of the Maués municipality.

== Formation ==
The unit was one of those listed to be created under ARPA (Amazon Region Protected Areas Program), a process that took some time. Creation of the Alto Maués Ecological Station was presented by the government as compensation for the impacts of the Tapajós hydroelectric complex on seven federal environmental units. There was political opposition in the state of Amazonas to creation of the unit since the municipality already had four protected units and the Andirá Marau Indigenous Territory. The protected units are the Amazônia National Park, Juruena National Park, Pau Rosa National Forest and Maués State Forest. It is thought that the area has high gold mining potential, which could create many jobs. The Alto Maués Ecological Station was created on 16 October 2014 and is administered by the Chico Mendes Institute for Biodiversity Conservation.

== Environment ==
Average annual rainfall is 2,101 millimetres (82.7 in) Temperatures ranges from 22 to 32 °C (72 to 90 °F) with an average of 27 °C (81 °F). About 78% of the unit is covered by dense submontane rainforest with emergent canopy, and 7% by dense submontane rainforest with uniform canopy. Smaller areas are covered by alluvial rainforest with uniform canopy and open submontane rainforest. The area is considered an ecological sanctuary, with an unusually high concentration of primates and more than 600 species of birds. It is a suitable habitat for survival of the jaguar. Of fourteen primate species, three are endemic. Threatened primates include the red-faced spider monkey, white-nosed saki and woolly monkey.

== Conservation ==
The Alto Maués Ecological Station is classed as IUCN protected area category Ia (strict nature reserve). The purpose is to protect a sample of the rain forest and associated vegetation types, ensure sustainability of the ecosystem and contribute to environmental stability of the region. The decree that created the unit did not delimit its buffer zone, an area where activities such as mining require authorization and controls to minimize environmental impact.

== Sources ==
- Estação Ecológica Alto Maués (in Portuguese), Chico Mendes Institute for Biodiversity Conservation.
- FLONA de Urupadi (in Portuguese), ISA: Instituto Socioaambiental
- Silvia de Melo Futada (17 October 2014), Dilma cria a Estação Ecológica Alto Maués (AM), a sétima Unidade Conservação esta semana (in Portuguese), ISA: Instituto Socioambiental
- Unidade de Conservação: Estação Ecológica Alto Maués (in Portuguese), MMA: Ministério do Meio Ambiente
