= Rio Gregório State Forest =

- Floresta estadual do Rio Gregório
- Location within Brazil
- Nearest city: Tarauacá
- Coordinates: 7°53′14″S 71°11′07″W
- Area: 216,062 hectares (533,900 acres)
- Designation: State forest
- Created: 9 March 2004
- Administrator: Instituto de Meio Ambiente do Acre

The Rio Gregório State Forest (Portuguese: Floresta estadual do Rio Gregório) is a state forest in the state of Acre, Brazil. The main economic activity is latex (rubber) extraction.

== Location ==
Conservation units in the west of Acre.: 5. Rio Gregório State Forest

The Rio Gregório State Forest is in the municipality of Tarauacá in the State of Acre. It has an area of 216,062 hectares (533,900 acres). The forest is bounded by the BR-364 highway to the south and the border with the state of Amazonas to the north. It adjoins the Rio Gregório Extractive Reserve in Amazonas. The Acurauá River forms the eastern boundary and the Gregório River forms the western boundary, separating the Rio Gregório State Forest from the Mogno State Forest.

The forest has a moist tropical climate, with average temperature above 18 °C (64 °F) in the coldest months. Annual rainfall is 2,191 to 2,296 millimetres (86.3 to 90.4 in), with least rain in the June–August period. Relative humidity is 80% to 90% throughout the year.

== History ==
The Rio Gregório State Forest was created by state governor decree 9718 of 9 March 2004 as part of a program of rational land use, which must be compatible with social, economic and biodiversity conservation objectives. It was recognised by the Instituto Nacional de Colonização e Reforma Agrária (National Institute for Colonization and Agrarian Reform – INCRA) as an agro-extraction project for 200 families on 28 April 2005. The consultative council for the Rio Gregório State Forest complex was created by decree on 19 September 2008. This covers the Rio Gregório, Mogno and Rio Liberdade state forests, all of which had been created on the same date. The governor installed the council members in April 2012. On 13 December 2010 INCRA corrected the number of families to 86.

== People and economy ==
In 2000 it was found that the forest had potential for agro-forestry or pastoral exploitation, including annual and perennial crops, livestock raising and fish culture. A study in 2005 identified 85 residences, of which 39 were along the BR-364, 24 along the left bank of the Acuraua and 12 along the right bank of the Gregório. Sustainable latex (rubber) extraction is the main form of extraction in the forest.

As of April 2012 there were 422 families in the Rio Gregório Forest Complex, which covered 480,000 hectares (1,200,000 acres) in total. The state's Department of Industry, Trade and Sustainable Services (SEDENS) had a number of plans for the complex. These included providing two new trucks to support the communities, making football fields in each community, providing coordinators to arrange meetings, resuming production of tree seedlings and providing assistance with family farming, small livestock and fish farming. Each family would get a concession of 100 hectares (250 acres) of which 20% could be cleared and the remainder used in a sustainable way. Wood processing factories were to be built in Cruzeiro do Sul and Tarauacá.

== Sources ==
- Emerson Magno Nantes Pereira Moulard (2005), Floresta estadual do Rio Gregório (Acre-Brasil): caracterização ambiental e análise de aspectos legais como subsídios à gestão de florestas públicas de produção (PDF) (Thesis) (in Portuguese), UFAC
- FES do Rio Gregório (in Portuguese), ISA: Instituto Socioambiental
- "Governo instala Conselho no Complexo Florestal do Rio Gregório", A Gazeta do Acre (in Portuguese), 30 April 2012
- MOS Complexo de Florestas Estaduais do Rio Gregório (in Portuguese), ISA: Instituto Socioambiental
