= Tapauá State Forest =

State forest in Amazonas, Brazil

- Floresta Estadual Tapauá
- Location within Brazil
- Coordinates: 6°27′11″S 63°26′49″W
- Designation: State forest

The Tapauá State Forest (Portuguese: Floresta Estadual Tapauá) is a state forest in the state of Amazonas, Brazil.

== Location ==
Conservation units in the Purus-Madeira interfluvial.: 9. Tapauá State Forest

The Tapauá State Forest is divided between the municipalities of Tapauá (97.9%) and Canutama (2.1%) in the state of Amazonas. It has an area of 881,704 hectares (2,178,740 acres). The state forest lies to the northwest of the BR-319 highway. It adjoins the Nascentes do Lago Jari National Park to the northeast and the Balata-Tufari National Forest to the southwest. The Ipixuna River, a tributary of the Purus River, runs through the state forest from south to north. The vegetation is 95.5% open rainforest and 4.5% dense rainforest.

== History ==
The Tapauá State Forest was created by Amazon state governor decree 28419 of 27 March 2009. It is part of a total of 28 protected areas that form a mosaic with which it is proposed to shield the Amazon rainforest against the effect of paving the BR-319 highway between Manaus and Porto Velho. On 16 November 2009 it was recognised as supporting 200 families, who qualified for PRONAF support.

The state-level conservation units in the BR-319 corridor are the Piagaçu-Purus, Rio Amapá, Rio Madeira, Igapó-Açu and Matupiri sustainable development reserves, Canutama Extractive Reserve, Canutama State Forest, Tapauá State Forest and Matupiri State Park. In December 2012 the Amazonas state government allocated more than R$6 million to these nine units, covering 30,000 square kilometres (12,000 sq mi) and 143 communities, to be coordinated by the State Center for Conservation Units (CEUC). The funding was for development of management plans, creation of management councils, environmental monitoring, land survey, and production and marketing.

The management plan for the Tapauá State Forest was approved on 22 July 2014.

== Sources ==
- FES Tapauá (in Portuguese), ISA: Instituto Socioambiental
- Unidades de Conservação estaduais da BR-319 recebem incentivo de R$ 6 milhões para implementação, Amazonas State Government, 26 December 2012
