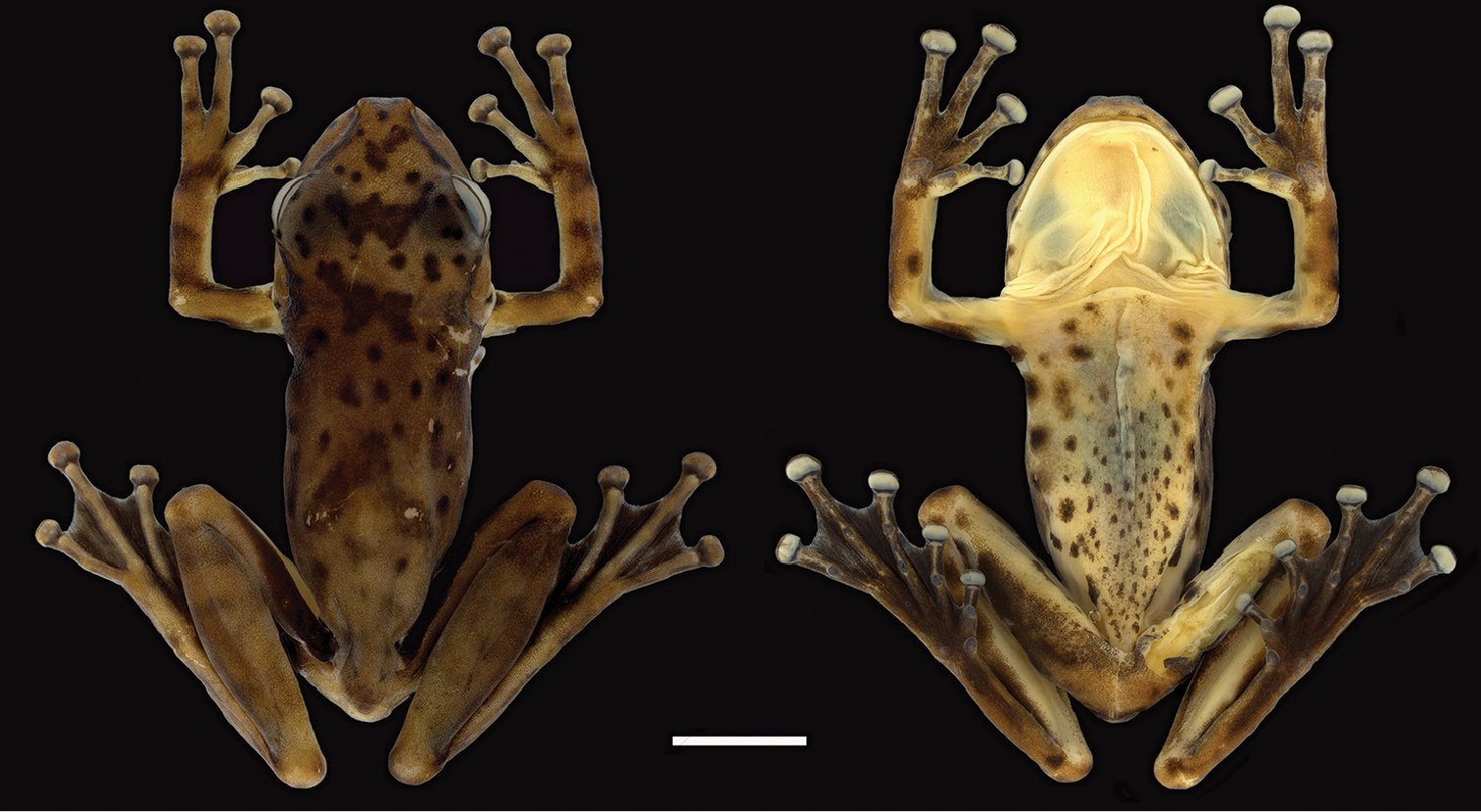
- Holotype of Scinax onca, an adult male

Scientific classification
- Kingdom: Animalia
- Phylum: Chordata
- Class: Amphibia
- Order: Anura
- Family: Hylidae
- Genus: Scinax
- Species: S. onca

Binomial name
- Scinax onca Ferrão, Moravec, Fraga, Pinheiro de Almeida, Kaefer, and Lima, 2017

= Scinax onca =

Species of frog

Scinax onca (common name: jaguar snouted tree frog) is a species of frog in the family Hylidae. It is endemic to Brazil and known from the middle and southern parts of the Purus-Madeira interfluvial region in the Amazonas and Rondônia states. The specific name onca is derived from the local common name for jaguar (Pantera onca) and refers to the frog's blotchy color pattern; jaguars were also frequently spotted in the Purus–Madeira interfluvial region during the field work.

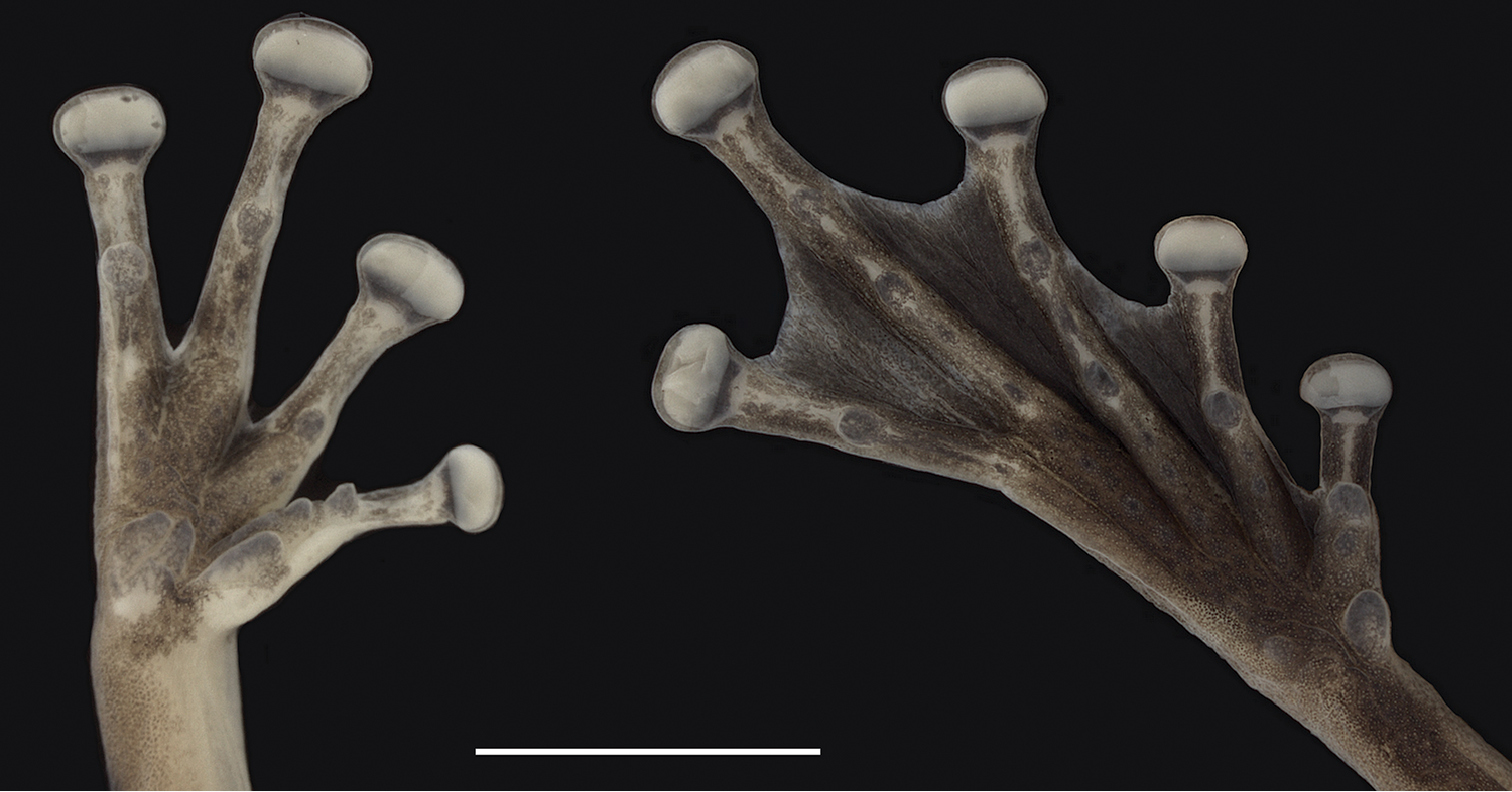
Hand and foot of holotype of Scinax onca. Scale bar 5 mm.

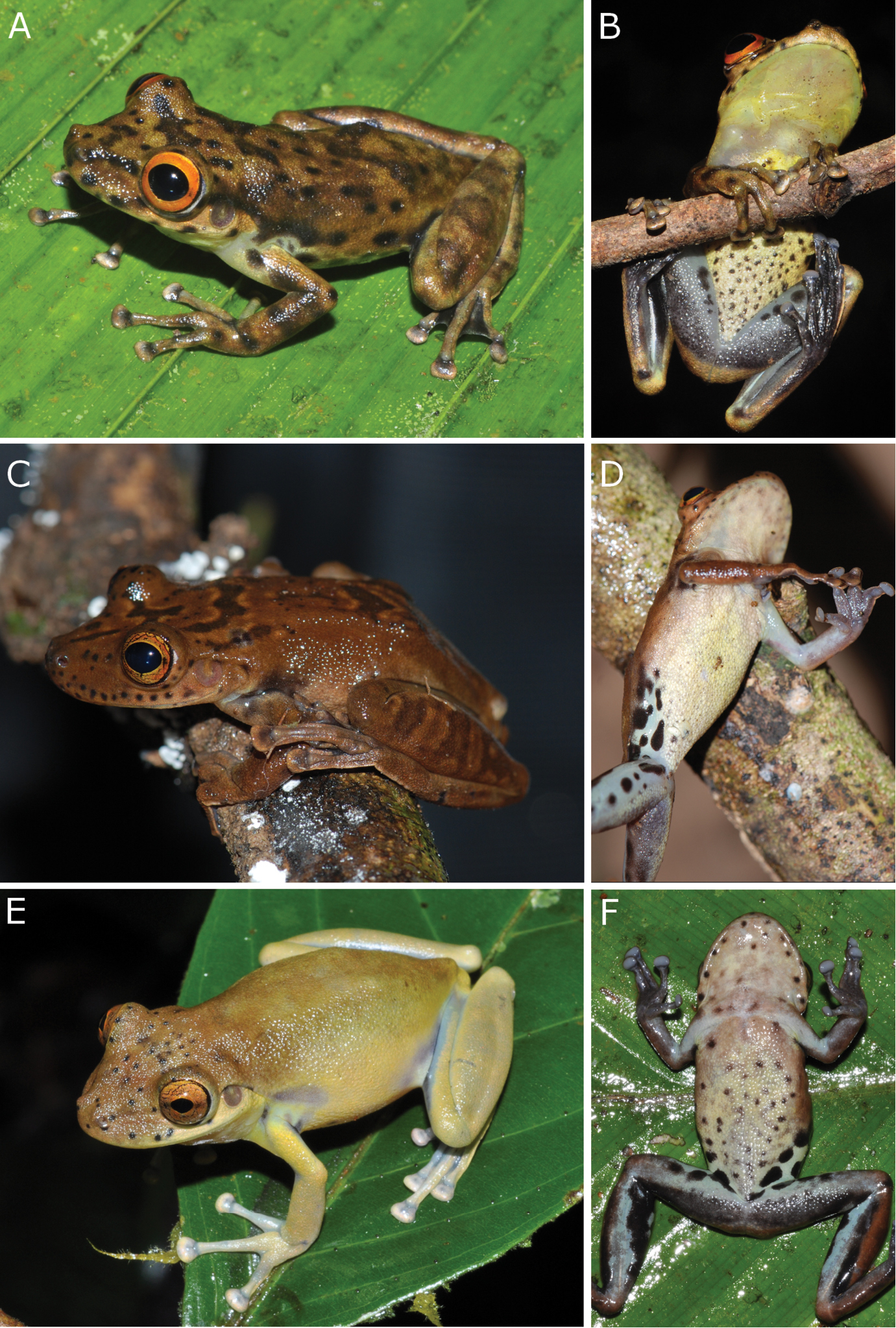
Color variation in Scinax onca. The specimen on the top row is a male while the others are females. Photographs A–D and F were taken after transport of the specimens to the camp, while the image of E was taken immediately in the field.

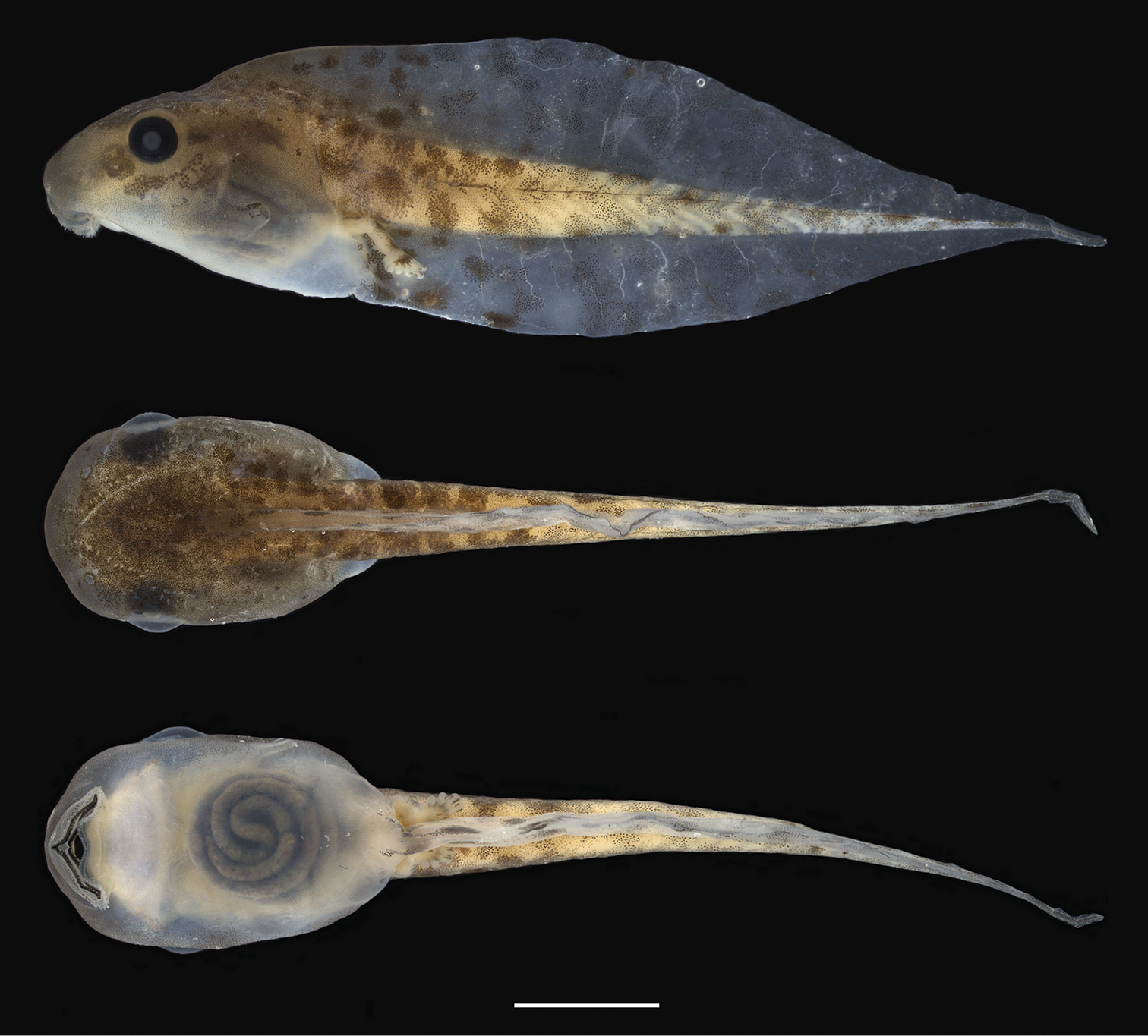
Tadpole of Scinax onca in dorsal, ventral, and lateral views. Scale bar 5 mm.

== Description ==
Adult males measure 31–35 mm (1.2–1.4 in) and adult females 36–40 mm (1.4–1.6 in) in snout–vent length. The snout is truncate in dorsal view and bluntly rounded in lateral view. The tympanum is distinct and a supra-tympanic fold is present but weak. The canthus rostralis is rounded. The forelimbs are slender with long fingers that have narrow lateral fringes and bear horizontally expanded discs; toes II–IV hase basal webbing. The hind limbs are long. The toe discs are more rounded than the finger discs. The toes are moderately webbed. The holotype has light brown dorsal ground colour. There is a W-shaped mark between the eyes, an irregular dark brown spot in scapular region, a Λ-shaped mark in sacral region, and numerous randomly distributed round dark brown spots on the head and body. A dark brown canthal stripe extends to tip of snout and a dark brown supra-tympanic stripe extends from corner of eye to anterior region of flanks. The limbs have brown transverse bars. The belly is yellowish laterally and white medially and has some randomly distributed round dark brown spots. The iris is bright orange. Manipulation of specimens changes their coloration: individuals became darker and spots and blotches became more conspicuous.

Males have a subgular, bilobate vocal sac. The male advertisement call is a single short, multipulsed note with duration of 102−121 ms.

The tadpole in stage 37 measure 35–38 mm (1.4–1.5 in) in total length, of which the tail makes more than two thirds.

== Habitat and conservation ==
Scinax onca is known from few lowland rainforest localities at elevations of 59–105 m (194–344 ft) above sea level. Breeding takes place during or after heavy rains at middle-sized or large temporary forest ponds. Males call from shrubs growing in water or next to water some 0.5–2 m (2–7 ft) above the ground.

As of late 2017, the International Union for Conservation of Nature (IUCN) has not assessed this species, but Ferrão and colleagues suggest that is should be considered "data deficient". Reconstruction of the Trans-Amazonian Highway BR-319 and the associated immigration and deforestation represent serious potential threats to it. One population, however, occurs in the Tapauá State Forest, representing a refuge.
