= Borba Municipality =

Borba Municipality may refer to:

- Borba Municipality, Portugal
- Borba, Amazonas (municipality)
