= Rio Gregório Extractive Reserve =

- Reserva Extrativista do Rio Gregório
- IUCN category VI (protected area with sustainable use of natural resources)
- Location within Brazil
- Nearest city: Ipixuna, Amazonas
- Coordinates: 7°31′58″S 71°12′11″W
- Area: 427,004 hectares (1,055,150 acres)
- Designation: Extractive reserve
- Created: 25 April 2007
- Administrator: Secretaria de Estado do Meio Ambiente do Amazonas

The Rio Gregório Extractive Reserve (Portuguese: Reserva Extrativista do Rio Gregório) is an extractive reserve in the state of Amazonas, Brazil. It supports about 200 families engaged in extraction of forest products, small-scale farming and animal husbandry.

== Location ==
The Rio Gregório Extractive Reserve is divided between the municipalities of Ipixuna (58.76%) and Eirunepé (41.22%) in the state of Amazonas. It has an area of 427,004 hectares (1,055,150 acres). To the north it is bounded by the Kulina do Médio Juruá Indigenous Territory. The border with the state of Acre defines the southern limit of the reserve.

The reserve adjoins the Rio Gregório State Forest and the Mogno State Forest in Acre. The reserve is south of the Juruá River, and southeast of the town of Ipixuna. The Gregório River runs through the reserve from Acre in a northeast direction. The Gregório River is a tributary of the middle section of the Juruá River. The reserve protects 80% of the sources of the river. The reserve may be reached by float plane or by river.

== History ==
The Rio Gregório Extractive Reserve was created by Amazonas state decree 26.586 of 25 April 2007 with an area of 477,042.3 hectares (1,178,797 acres). The Instituto Nacional de Colonização e Reforma Agrária (INCRA, National Institute for Colonization and Agrarian Reform) recognised the reserve on 12 November 2007 as supporting 157 families of small farmers, who would qualify for PRONAF assistance. This was adjusted to 200 families on 12 November 2008. When created the reserve included an area of territory disputed between the states of Acre and Amazonas. The supreme court of Brazil settled the case in favour of Acre in 2008, and the reserve was reduced to about 305,200 hectares (754,000 acres).

The deliberative council was created on 28 January 2009. The management plan was approved on 13 May 2013. On 15 December 2014 an area of privately owned property of 70,536 hectares (174,300 acres) was alienated by the state. The land had been owned by R. Pereira & Cia. since the early 20th century, but had not been identified in the 2010 management plan. The state did not have the money to pay compensation for the property. On 11 March 2016 the limits of the reserve were altered to now encompass 427,004 hectares (1,055,150 acres). 40,000 hectares (99,000 acres) of the R. Pereira & Cia. land was excluded from the reserve, but over 118,000 hectares (290,000 acres) of land to the west was added.

On 24 February and 3 March 2015 about 270 inhabitants of the reserve participated in a major event led by the Amazonas Sustainable Foundation promoting health, education and citizenship. This included pre-registration of 425 elementary school children and distribution of almost 4,000 sachets for purifying water on the reserve. In the next three weeks the number of cases of diarrhea dropped to zero, compared to four or five cases per week before. It was expected that 19 teachers would give lessons in 15 schools in the reserve built or renovated by the Bolsa Floresta over the previous four years.

As of 2016 the reserve was covered by the Amazon Region Protected Areas Program. On 21–22 May 2016 a meeting of 126 ribeirinhos (river people) from 27 locations in the reserve elected a new board for the Rio Gregório Extractive Reserve Association of Agroextractive Residents (Amarge). This is the main institution representing the people of the reserve, a partner of the Bolsa Floresta Program. The meeting was supported by the Amazonas Sustainable Foundation, Bradesco and the Amazonia Fund/Brazilian Development Bank.

== Environment ==
The reserve is about 77% covered by open rainforest and the remainder is covered by dense rainforest. The original forest is very well preserved, with only about 2,000 hectares (4,900 acres) modified by the settlements and their gardens. There is a wide range of extractive products such as rubber, copaiba oil, buriti fruit, tagua seed, vines, and the acai, andiroba and patauá fruits. Initial studies show that the reserve is an ecologically interesting area, with 13 species of monkeys. The Rio Tapajós saki (Pithecia irrorata vanzolini), emperor tamarin (Saguinus imperator subgriscenses), brown-mantled tamarin (Saguinus fuscicollis melanoleucus) and bald uakari (Cacajao calvus novaesi) are endemic to this area of the Amazon.

The region was exploited for rubber from the end of the 19th century. After the rubber boom ended there were 19 communities descended from the pioneer rubber tappers, who still extract forest products. The rubber tappers form small communities along the Gregório River. They are also engaged in agriculture, hunting, fishing and animal husbandry. The management plan allows no more than 5% of the total area to be used for farming or pasturage. Threats include possible release of buffalo, pigs and other exotic species that threaten the ecosystems, over-fishing, trade in wildlife and domestic livestock, and illegal logging.

== Sources ==
- Associação de Moradores Agroextrativistas da Resex Rio Gregório tem nova gestão, Fundação Amazonas Sustentável, 7 June 2016
- Full list: PAs supported by ARPA, ARPA
- Reserva Extrativista Rio Gregório recebe ações de saúde e educação (in Portuguese), Fundação Amazonas Sustentável, 18 March 2015
- RESEX do Rio Gregório, ISA: Instituto Socioambiental
- Sílvia Futada; Marina Spindel (22 March 2016), Reserva Extrativista do Rio Gregório (AM) é ampliada em mais de 118 mil hectares (in Portuguese), ISA: Instituto Socioambiental
