= Amapá River =

River in Brazil

- Location within Brazil
- Native name: Rio Amapa (Portuguese)

Location
- Country: Brazil

Physical characteristics
- Source
  - location: Amazonas
- Mouth
  - location: Matupiri River
  - coordinates: 5.249210°S 61.429082°W

The Amapá River (Portuguese: Rio Amapá) is a river of the state of Amazonas, Brazil. It is a tributary of the Matupiri River.

== Course ==
The Amapá River rises in the 304,146 hectares (751,560 acres) Lago do Capanã Grande Extractive Reserve, created in 2004. It flows across the reserve in an east-northeast direction, crosses the Rio Amapá Sustainable Development Reserve and then flows through the Matupiri State Park, where it joins the Matupiri River.

== See also ==
- List of rivers of Amazonas
