= Bolsa Floresta Program =

- Formation: 2007
- Type: State program
- Legal status: Replaced by the "Programa Floresta em Pé" ("Standing Forests")
- Purpose: Conservation through sustainable exploitation
- Headquarters: Rua Álvaro Braga, 351, Parque Dez de Novembro
- Location: Manaus, Amazonas
- Region served: Amazonas, Brazil
- Services: Education, organizational support
- Official language: Portuguese
- Parent organization: Amazonas Sustainable Foundation

The Bolsa Floresta Program (Programa Bolsa Floresta PBF) is a program run by the Amazonas Sustainability Foundation in the state of Amazonas, Brazil, to encourage conservation of forests through sustainable use. It provides direct financial assistance and indirect support to the residents of sustainable use protected areas of Brazil in exchange for their engaging in conservation measures.

== History ==
The Amazonas Sustainability Foundation (Fundação Amazonas Sustentável: FAS) is a private NGO based in Manaus, Amazonas, that promotes environmental conservation through sustainable development in state conservation units. It is a partnership between the government of the state of Amazonas and Banco Bradesco. The FAS was created in December 2007 to manage environmental products and services from State conservation units, and manage the Bolsa Floresta program. It is funded by affiliated NGOs, government bodies and private individuals and enterprises. Most of the funding comes from private sources such as Coca-Cola, Samsung, Grupo Abril and Marriott International.

The Bolsa Floresta (Note: Bolsa Floresta may be translated "Forest Allowance".) Program (Programa Bolsa Floresta: PBF) has its origins in the Zona Franca Verde initiatives launched in 2003 by The Amazonas State Secretariat of the Environment and Sustainable Development (SDS) to promote sustainable use of natural resources in order to increase the environmental benefits of the forests. The SDS initiated the program in September 2007 and assigned it to the FAS in March 2008. Bolsa Floresta is the main FAS program. The main funding comes from Bradesco and the Amazon Fund, which is supported by the Brazilian Development Bank (BNDES) and the Government of Norway. Deforestation is monitored annually by the FAS, SDS, and analysis of satellite images by partner organisations.

== Participation ==
The Bolsa Floresta program, which is voluntary, involves families living along the rivers within state-run conservation units in Amazonas. The initial focus on conservation units is due to the availability of an existing legal framework. It is planned is to later extend the program to other areas. The formal income of most of the eligible families would place them at the extreme poverty level. However, this is raised considerably after accounting for the value of slash-and-burn cultivation of cassava, hunting, fishing and collection of forest products.

The program provides social benefits and support for community associations in return for participation in workshops on environmental services, commitment not to open new areas of cultivation in the primary forest, and permanent enrolment of children in school. The basic goal is to improve the quality of life by valuing the standing forest. Bolsa Floresta imposes slightly more stringent rules than those set out in the conservation unit management plans. The family must join the reserve association and pay the association fee, must send their children to school, cannot increase the area under cultivation and can only clear secondary growth for crop rotation. However, enrolment in Bolsa Floresta by eligible families is close to 100%.

By the end of 2008, the program covered the Uatumã, Mamirauá, Piagaçu-Purus, Uacari and Cujubim sustainable development reserves and the Catuá-Ipixuna Extractive Reserve. There were plans to extend the program by 2010 to also include Maués State Forest, the Amanã, Juma, Rio Madeira, and Rio Amapá sustainable development reserves and the Rio Gregório Extractive Reserve. As of 2016 the program was operating in fifteen conservation units covering a total of more than 100,000 square kilometres (39,000 sq mi). Of these the Juma Sustainable Development Reserve was a certified REDD+ initiative and the other fourteen were in the REDD+ readiness phase.

== Program components ==
The program has four components: income, family, association and social. The income component of the program supports sustainable income-generation activities including local processing of products to add value, ecotourism, fish farming, natural honey production and breeding of small livestock. The family component gives a small monthly payment of R$50 (US$30) to each household in exchange for a commitment to preserve the forest. The stipend is paid to the mothers of families who live in conservation units as a reward for conserving the forest. The association component provides funds to associations of residents of the reserves, who may freely decide how they want to use the funds. The association component, which aims to strengthen community organisation and control of the program, is equal to about 10% of the family component.

The social component, coordinated with government institutions, improves education, sanitation, health, communications and transport infrastructure. Health is seen as an essential part of the program, since the other benefits have limited value if not accompanied by improved health. The program works with other state and private organisations to improve health among the Bolsa Floresta participants. Malaria, diarrhea, influenza and helminthiasis (worm infection) together make up about 95% of diseases in Bolsa Floresta conservation units. The FAS is involved in training health care workers in ways of preventing these diseases, and in developing plans for each conservation unit. For example, distribution of sachets for purifying water in Rio Gregório Extractive Reserve in 2015 resulted in a drastic drop in cases of diarrhea.

== Replacement of the program ==
In 2018, it was replaced by a new program called "Programa Floresta em Pé" ("Standing Forests").

== Sources ==
- Como funciona o Bolsa Floresta, FAS: Fundação Amazonas Sustentável
- Reserva Extrativista Rio Gregório recebe ações de saúde e educação (in Portuguese), Fundação Amazonas Sustentável, 18 March 2015
- Riyong Kim Bakkegaard; Sven Wunder (2014), "Bolsa Floresta, Brazil", in Erin O Sills (ed.), REDD+ on the ground, CIFOR: Center for International Forestry Research, ISBN 978-602-1504-55-0. Licensed under Creative Commons Attribution 4.0 International (CC BY 4.0)
- "The Forest Conservation Grant Fund (Bolsa Floresta)", Forest Carbon Portal, archived from the original on 2016-09-19
- Virgilio M. Viana (December 2008), "Bolsa Floresta (Forest Conservation Allowance): An innovative mechanism to promote health in traditional communities in the Amazon" (PDF), Estud. Av., 22 (64), São Paulo, ISSN 1806-9592
