= Matupiri Sustainable Development Reserve =

Protected area in Amazonas, Brazil

- Reserva de Desenvolvimento Sustentável do Matupiri
- IUCN category VI (protected area with sustainable use of natural resources)
- Location within Brazil
- Nearest city: Borba, Amazonas
- Coordinates: 4°53′40″S 60°36′30″W
- Area: 179,083 hectares (442,520 acres)
- Designation: Sustainable development reserve
- Created: 27 March 2009
- Administrator: Secretaria de Estado do Meio Ambiente do Amazonas

The Matupiri Sustainable Development Reserve (Portuguese: Reserva de Desenvolvimento Sustentável do Matupiri) is a sustainable development reserve in the state of Amazonas, Brazil.

== Location ==
Conservation units in the Purus-Madeira interfluvial.: 17. Matupiri Sustainable Development Reserve

The Matupiri Sustainable Development Reserve is in the municipality of Borba, Amazonas. It has an area of 179,083 hectares (442,520 acres). The reserve is in the basin of the Madeira River. The Cunhã-Sapucaia Indigenous Territory adjoins the reserve to the north. To the east it adjoins the Matupiri State Park. To the south it adjoins the Rio Madeira Sustainable Development Reserve. The Matupiri River crosses the western portion of the reserve from southwest to northeast and then forms part of the boundary between the reserve and the Cunhã-Sapucaia Indigenous Territory.

== History ==
The Matupiri Sustainable Development Reserve was created by decree 28423 of 27 March 2009. It was one of five conservation units created to meet some of the environmental licensing requirements for the work to upgrade the BR-319 highway from Porto Velho to Manaus, which was suspended by Carlos Minc, the Minister of the Environment. Minc defended what he called a "green pocket" around the highway.

Construction of roads in the forests elsewhere had often encouraged deforestation, with a "herringbone" pattern of logging roads radiating from the highway. Thus the paving of BR-163 from Cuiabá, Mato Grosso to Santarém, Pará had increased deforestation in the area by 500%.

The state-level conservation units in the BR-319 corridor are the Piagaçu-Purus, Rio Amapá, Rio Madeira, Igapó-Açu, and Matupiri sustainable development reserves, Canutama Extractive Reserve, Canutama State Forest, Tapauá State Forest, and Matupiri State Park. In December 2012 the Amazonas state government allocated more than R$6 million to these nine units, covering 30,000 square kilometres (12,000 sq mi) and 143 communities, to be coordinated by the State Center for Conservation Units (CEUC). The funding was for the development of management plans, creation of management councils, environmental monitoring, land survey, and production and marketing.

The management plan for the Matupiri Sustainable Development Reserve was approved on 22 July 2014.

== Sources ==
- Luana Lourenço (27 March 2009), Amazonas cria seis unidades de conservação em torno de rodovia do PAC (in Portuguese), Agência Brasil
- RDS do Matupiri (in Portuguese), ISA: Instituto Socioambiental
- Unidades de Conservação estaduais da BR-319 recebem incentivo de R$ 6 milhões para implementação, Amazonas State Government, 26 December 2012, archived from the original on 2016-09-11
