= Maués Açu River =

Coordinates: 3°22′S 57°44′W

Location
- Country: Brazil
- State: Amazonas

Physical characteristics
- Source: confluence of the Amanã and Paracori Rivers
- Mouth: Paraná Urariá
- Length: 370 km (230 mi)

Basin features
- Tributaries
  - right: Urupadi River (Maraú River)

Maués Açu River (Portuguese: Rio Maués-Açu) is a river of the northwest Brazilian state of Amazonas. The upper course of the river is known as Parauari River. It is located east of the Madeira River and south of the Amazon River. It is connected to both these, as well as several other smaller rivers, via the Paraná Urariá channel. The town of Maués is located on the eastern bank of the river near the point where it merges into Paraná Urariá.

== See also ==
- List of rivers of Amazonas
