= Ipixuna =

Municipality of Amazonas, Brazil

- Municipality
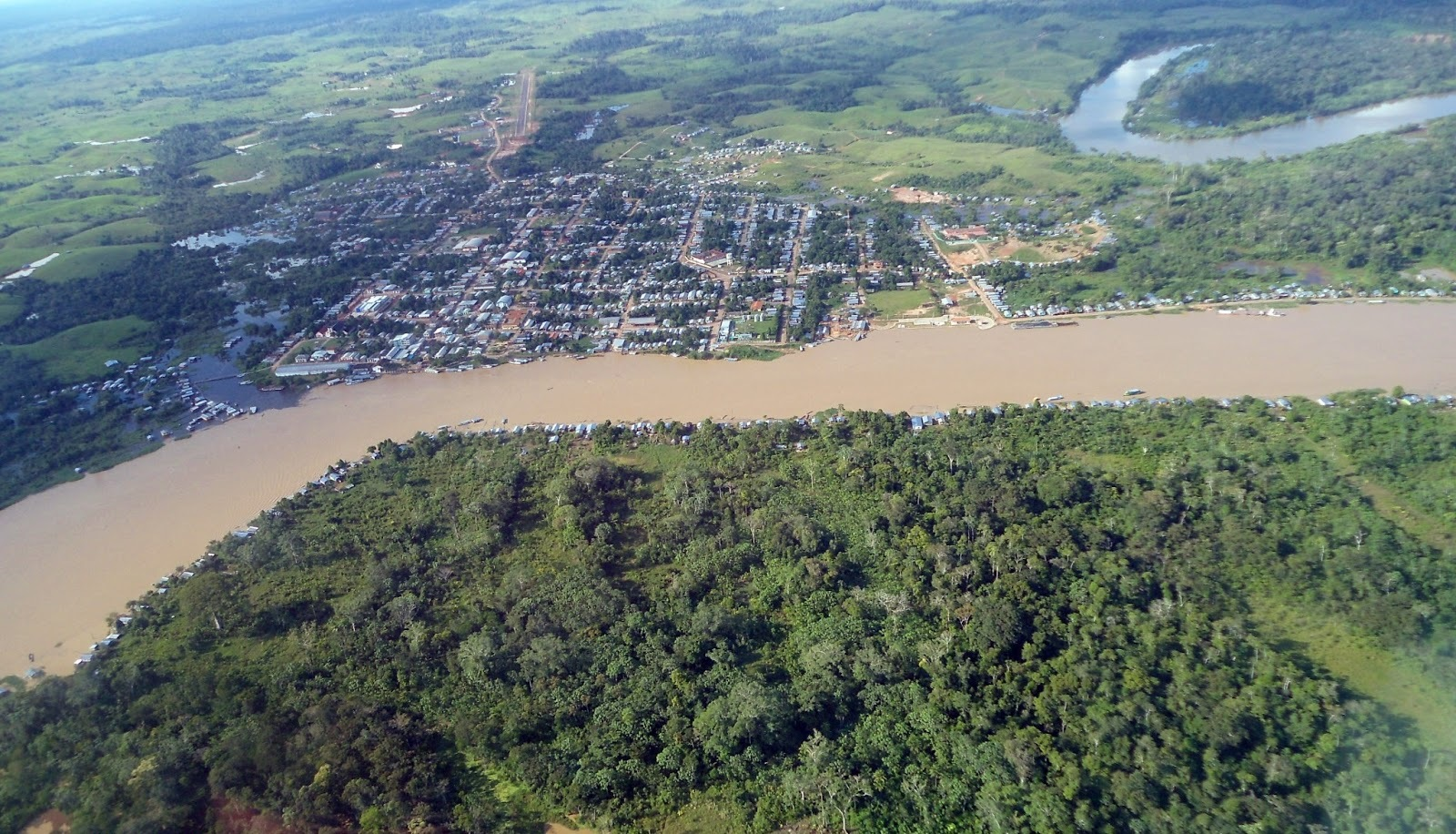

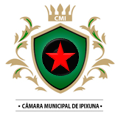
- Flag Coat of arms

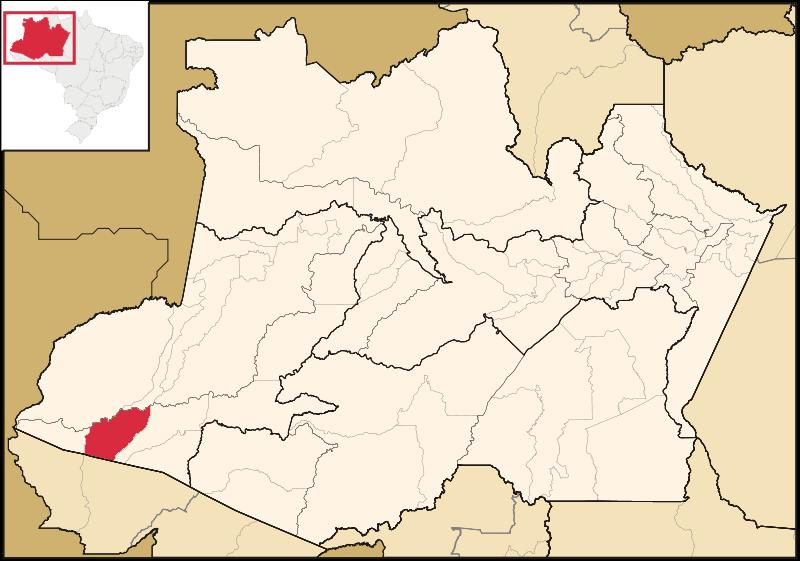
- Location of the municipality inside Amazonas
- Coordinates: 7°3′3″S 71°41′42″W
- Country: Brazil
- Region: North
- State: Amazonas

Population (2020)
  - Total: 30,436
- Time zone: UTC−4 (AMT)

Ipixuna is a municipality located in the Brazilian state of Amazonas. Its population was 30,436 (2020) and its area is 13,566 km^{2}.

The municipality contains 58.76% of the 427,004-hectare (1,055,150-acre) Rio Gregório Extractive Reserve.
