= Amanã River =

- Location within Brazil

Location
- Country: Brazil

Physical characteristics
- Source
  - location: Pará state
- Mouth
  - coordinates: 4.386620°S 57.584109°W

Basin features
- River system: Maués Açu River

Amanã River is a river of Amazonas and Pará states in north-western Brazil.

The Amanã River flows through the Alto Maués Ecological Station. It joins the Parauari River to form the Maués Açu River.

== See also ==
- List of rivers of Amazonas
- List of rivers of Pará
