= Allobates caeruleodactylus =

Conservation status
- Least Concern (IUCN 3.1)

Scientific classification
- Kingdom: Animalia
- Phylum: Chordata
- Class: Amphibia
- Order: Anura
- Family: Aromobatidae
- Genus: Allobates
- Species: A. caeruleodactylus

Binomial name
- Allobates caeruleodactylus (Lima & Caldwell, 2001)

Synonyms
- Colostethus caeruleodactylus Lima & Caldwell, 2001

Species of frog

Allobates caeruleodactylus is a species of frog in the family Aromobatidae. It is endemic to Amazonas in Brazil.

== Habitat ==
These frogs have been found in igapó forests in which the streams seasonally flood to form interconnected pools.

This frog has been observed within the borders of three protected areas: Floresta Nacional de Balata-Tufari, Floresta Nacional de Carajás, and Reserva de Desenvolvimento Sustentável Rio Amapa.

== Young ==
The male frogs perch on top of the leaf litter or twigs and call to the female frogs, primarily in April and May. The male frogs exhibit territorial behavior, possibly related to the long duration of courtship.

The tadpoles develop in the pools of water that form when the streams flood.

== Threats ==
The IUCN classifies this frog as least concern of extinction. It is subject to some localized threat from logging in the southern portion of its range and from patches of urbanization and mining.

There have been no reported sightings of this frog on the international pet trade, but frogs in Colostethus that share its coloration have appeared there.
