= Scinax sateremawe =

Conservation status
- Least Concern (IUCN 3.1)

Scientific classification
- Kingdom: Animalia
- Phylum: Chordata
- Class: Amphibia
- Order: Anura
- Family: Hylidae
- Genus: Scinax
- Species: S. sateremawe

Binomial name
- Scinax sateremawe Sturaro and Peloso, 2014

Species of frog

Scinax sateremawe is a frog in the family Hylidae. It is endemic to Brazil. Scientists know it from its type locality in the Floresta Nacional de Pau-Rosa.

== Description ==
The adult male frog measures 36.3 mm (1.43 in) in snout-vent length. This frog has large, black-lined orange spots.

== Habitat ==
This frog lives in primary and secondary forests. Scientists have seen it on perched on tree branches and shrubs near permanent ponds and flooded areas. Scientists observed the frog 45 m (150 ft) above sea level.
