= Jutaí River (Matupiri) =

- Location within Brazil
- Native name: Rio Jutaí (Portuguese)

Location
- Country: Brazil

Physical characteristics
- Mouth
  - coordinates: 5.300226°S 61.852141°W

The Jutaí River (Portuguese: Rio Jutaí is a river of the state if Amazonas, Brazil. It is one of the headwaters of the Matupiri River.

The Matupiri River forms in the 217,109 hectares (536,490 acres) Rio Amapá Sustainable Development Reserve where the Jutaí and Novo rivers converge.

== See also ==
- List of rivers of Amazonas
