= Pau-Rosa National Forest =

National forest in Amazonas, Brazil

- Floresta Nacional de Pau-Rosa
- IUCN category VI (protected area with sustainable use of natural resources)
- Location within Brazil
- Nearest city: Maués, Amazonas
- Coordinates: 4°43′26″S 57°59′50″W
- Area: 827,877 hectares (2,045,730 acres)
- Designation: National forest
- Created: 7 August 2001
- Administrator: ICMBio

The Pau-Rosa National Forest (Portuguese: Floresta Nacional de Pau-Rosa) is a national forest in the state of Amazonas, Brazil.

== Location ==
The Pau-Rosa National Forest is divided between the municipalities of Maués (98.63%) and Nova Olinda do Norte (1.37%) in Amazonas. It has an area of 827,877 hectares (2,045,730 acres). The national forest adjoins Maués State Forest to the north, Amazônia National Park to the east, Amaná National Forest to the southeast and Alto Maués Ecological Station to the southwest. The Abacaxis River forms the western boundary of the southern section, and the Paraconi River forms the western boundary of the northern section.

Initial samples of the fauna have found 40 species of amphibians, 20 of reptiles and almost 270 of birds. A new species of frog, Scinax sateremawe, was found in 2009 with an abundant population.

== History ==
The Pau-Rosa National Forest was created by federal decree of 7 August 2001 with the objective of promoting management of multiple use of natural resources, maintenance and protection of biodiversity and water resources, recovery of degraded area, and environmental education, as well as support for sustainable development of natural resources. It had an area of about 827,877 hectares (2,045,730 acres). The forest is administered by the Chico Mendes Institute for Biodiversity Conservation. It is classed as IUCN protected area category VI (protected area with sustainable use of natural resources).

On 30 November 2009, the forest was recognized as supporting the needs of 300 families of small rural producers, who would be eligible for PRONAF support. The advisory council was created on 24 May 2012. On 26 February 2015, ICMBio assigned the right to use about 311,634.26 hectares (770,065.0 acres) of the total of 1,108,413 hectares (2,738,950 acres) to the Associação dos Trabalhadores Rurais da Comunidade de Santa Maria do Caiaué - Atrasmacurapa (Association of Rural Workers of the Community of Santa Maria do Caiaué).

== Sources ==
- Flona de Pau-Rosa (in Portuguese), ICMBio: Chico Mendes Institute for Biodiversity Conservation
- FLONA de Pau-Rosa (in Portuguese), ISA: Instituto Socioambiental
- Peloso, Pedro; Sturaro, Marcelo José (14 May 2014), Inventário na Flona Pau Rosa revelou novas espécies de sapo, Belém: Conservação Internacional (CI-Brasil)
- Unidade de Conservação: Floresta Nacional de Pau-Rosa (in Portuguese), MMA: Ministério do Meio Ambiente
