= Homero de Miranda Leão =

Brazilian politician and poet (1913–1987)

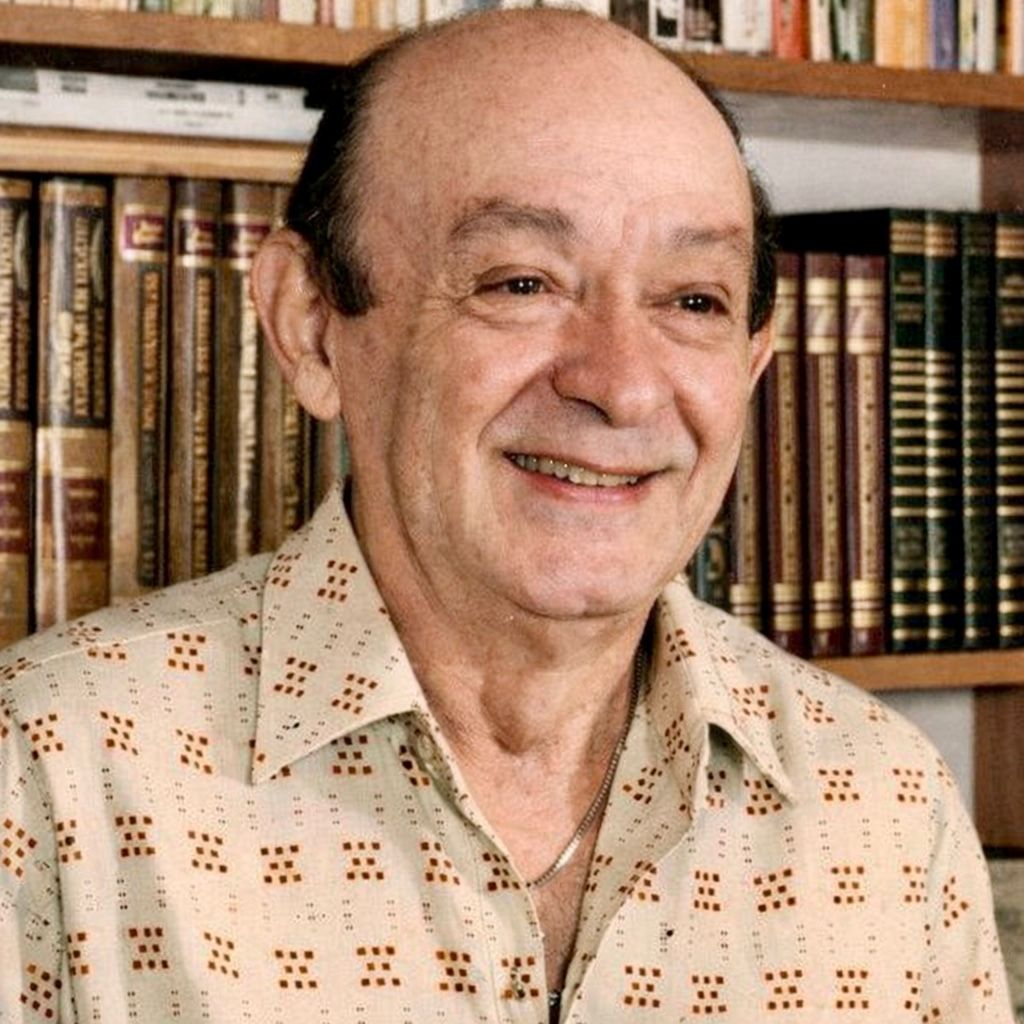
Miranda Leão in 1985

Homero de Miranda Leão (1 January 1913 – 8 August 1987) was a brazilian politician and poet.

He was born in Maués, Amazonas, Brazil, the son of Manuel José de Miranda Leão and Eponina Martins de Miranda Leão, he was married to Letícia Faraco de Miranda Leão.

== Politics ==
=== Estado Novo ===
During the Vargas dictatorship, without elections, in 1938 he was declared Mayor of Urucará. In 1941 he was declared Mayor of Manacapuru, and in the same year he would be transferred to Manicoré.

=== Democratic Period ===
In 1946 he was elected with 460 votes to the State Legislature as part of the National Democratic Union (UDN), a party aligned with conservatism. In the 1950 elections he would be elected with 587 votes, again for the UDN. He would again be elected in the 1962 elections, this time with 1,189 votes, for the Social Democratic Party (PSD).

=== Military Regime ===
In 1967 he was a signatory of "Em Defesa da Zona Franca de Manaus"(English: In defense of the Free Zone of Manaus) a manifesto against the altering of the law number 268 of the 28 february 1967, and the taking away of financial incentives for the Zone.

He was interim governor for Amazonas in 1970.

He was the leader of National Renewal Alliance (ARENA) in the state legislature in 1976, when he called for the replacement for the chief of the Superintendency of Development for the Amazon (SUDAM) due to floodings.

== Literature ==
He was a member of the Union of Brazilian Writers and the Amazonian Academy of Letters

In 1960 he published a book of poems titled Mundurucânia.

== Honors ==
There is a school named in his honor located in the north of Manaus.
