= Sustainable development reserve (Brazil) =

A sustainable development reserve (Portuguese: Reserva de Desenvolvimento Sustentável, RDS) in Brazil is a type of protected area inhabited by a traditional population that seeks to preserve nature while maintaining and improving the life of the population through sustainable development.

== Background ==
The concept of Sustainable Development Reserves originated in the Projeto Mamirauá launched in the early 1990s by the Sociedade Civil Mamirauá. The project followed the principle of management based on scientific research and controlled use of natural resources. The local population participates actively in the planning process and in responsible for managing and monitoring the area. Key aspects are that the strategy can adapt to changes in the market, private property is maintained, plans are implemented to improve living conditions, and the local people partner with government agencies and NGOs to develop proposals for sustainable use.

The Mamirauá Sustainable Development Reserve was established in 1996, the first such reserve in Brazil. The adjacent Amanã Sustainable Development Reserve was established in 1998 after the successful implementation of the Mamirauá reserve, and was fully supported by the local people. They already recognized the importance of preserving the vegetation and animals that they depend upon for their livelihood. The new category of protected area was included in the National Protected Areas System (SNUG), which defined types of protected area of Brazil in 2000.

== Structure ==
A Sustainable Development Reserve (RDS) holds traditional populations that live by sustainable exploitation of natural resources, developed over generations and adapted to the local ecology, and that protect nature and maintain biological diversity. The goals are to preserve nature while preserving and improving the quality of life of the traditional populations, and to advance scientific knowledge and understanding of traditional techniques for managing the environment.

The land in an RDS is in the public domain, and may be expropriated. Land use is regulated according to Law 9985 article 23 (2000) and in specific regulations. A board of directors is chaired by the administrative agency and includes representatives of public bodies, civil society organizations and traditional populations living in the area. A management plan is created by the administrative agency, which recognises the dynamic balance between conservation goals and the size of the population. Natural ecosystems may be exploited sustainably, and cultivation of introduced species is allowed, subject to the management plan. The plan defines areas where the ecology is fully protected, buffer zones, zones of sustainable use and ecological corridors. Public visits to the RDS are allowed and encouraged where compatible with local interests and the management plan. Scientific research and education with focus on conservation of nature are also encouraged.

== Selected reserves ==
Conservation Unit	Level	State	Area (ha)	Created	Biome
Alcobaça	State	Pará	36,128	2002	
Amanã	State	Amazonas	2,350,000	1998	Amazon
Aripuanã	State	Amazonas	224,291	2005	Amazon
Aventureiro	State	Rio de Janeiro	1,312	2014	Coastal Marine
Bararati	State	Amazonas	113,606	2005	Amazon
Barra do Una	State	São Paulo	1,487	2006	Coastal Marine
Barreiro/Anhemas	State	São Paulo	3,175	2008	Atlantic Forest
Canumã	State	Amazonas	22,355	2005	Amazon
Concha D'Ostra	State	Espírito Santo	953	2003	Atlantic Forest
Cujubim	State	Amazonas	2,450,380	2003	Amazon
Despraiado	State	São Paulo	3,953	2006	Atlantic Forest
Igapó-Açu	State	Amazonas	397,557	2009	Amazon
Itapanhapima	State	São Paulo	1,243	2008	Atlantic Forest
Itatupã-Baquiá	Federal	Pará	64,735	2005	
Juma	State	Amazonas	589,611	2006	Amazon
Lavras	State	São Paulo	890	2008	Atlantic Forest
Mamirauá	State	Amazonas	1,124,000	1990	Amazon
Matupiri	State	Amazonas	179,083	2009	Amazon
Nascentes Geraizeiras	Federal	Minas Gerais	38,177	2014	Cerrado
Piagaçu-Purus	State	Amazonas	1,008,167	2003	Amazon
Pinheirinhos	State	São Paulo	1,531	2008	Atlantic Forest
Pucuruí-Ararão	State	Pará	29,049	2002	
Puranga Conquista	State	Amazonas	76,936	2014	Amazon
Quilombos de Barra do Turvo	State	São Paulo	5,826	2008	Atlantic Forest
Rio Amapá	State	Amazonas	216,109	2005	Amazon
Rio Iratapuru	State	Amapá	806,184	1997	
Rio Madeira	State	Amazonas	283,117	2006	Amazon
Rio Negro	State	Amazonas	103,086	2008	Amazon
Tupé	Municipal	Amazonas	11,930	2005	Amazon
Uacari	State	Amazonas	632,949	2005	Amazon
Uatumã	State	Amazonas	424,430	2004	Amazon
Urariá	Municipal	Amazonas	59,137	2001	Amazon

== Sources ==
- Luiz Claudio Marigo (January–February 1999), "Reserva de Desenvolvimento Sustentável Amanã", AO (in Portuguese) (87), Rio de Janeiro
- Reserva de Desenvolvimento Sustentáve (in Portuguese), ISA: Instituto Socioambiental
- Reservas de Desenvolvimento Sustentável (in Portuguese), Sociedade Civil Mamirauá
