= Urariá Sustainable Development Reserve =

Protected are in Amazonas, Brazil

- Reserva de Desenvolvimento Sustentável Urariá
- IUCN category VI (protected area with sustainable use of natural resources)
- Location within Brazil
- Nearest city: Maués, Amazonas
- Coordinates: 3.421300°S 57.987599°W
- Area: 59,137 hectares (146,130 acres)
- Designation: Sustainable development reserve
- Created: 20 November 2001
- Administrator: Instituto de Desenvolvimento Sustentável de Maués

The Urariá Sustainable Development Reserve (Portuguese: Reserva de Desenvolvimento Sustentável Urariá) is a sustainable development reserve in the state of Amazonas, Brazil.

== Location ==
The Urariá Sustainable Development Reserve in the municipality of Maués, Amazonas. It has an area of 59,137 hectares (146,130 acres). The reserve is on the left bank of the Paraná do Urariá in the northwest of the municipality of Maues. It is about 260 kilometres (160 mi) in a straight line or 356 kilometres (221 mi) by river from Manaus.

The reserve has the capacity to support 750 families. There are eleven scattered communities in the reserve. The Grande da Barreira Lake area has seven communities, the Curuçá Lake area has two communities and there are two communities on the Paraná do Urariá. Most of the residents are engaged in farming, fishing or extraction of forest resources. They gain income from sale of cassava flour, fish, Brazil nuts and guaraná fruit, and raise cattle on a small scale.

== History ==
The Urariá Sustainable Development Reserve was created by municipal decree 40 of 20 November 2001. The main purpose was to manage the intense exploitation of fish stocks in the lake area, while relieving the poverty of the residents. From the start, the reserve followed the principles of sustainable development, improvements to the quality of life of the residents and respect for the environment. The municipality created the Instituto de Desenvolvimento Sustentável de Maués (IDS Maués) to manage the reserve, and the Agroambiental Consultoria e Organização Projetos Ltda., a social organization with an office in Manaus. The reserve would be included in the proposed South Amazon Ecological Corridor.

== Sources ==
- Ayres, José Márcio; Da Fonseca, Gustavo A. B.; Rylands, Anthony B.; Queiroz, Helder L.; Pinto, Luiz Paulo; Masterson, Donald; Cavalcanti, Roberto B. (2005), Os Corredores Ecológicos das Florestas Tropicais do Brasil (PDF) (in Portuguese), Sociedade Civil Mamirauá, archived from the original (PDF) on 2016-07-31
- Paese, Adriana; Uezu, Alexandre; Lorini, Maria Lucia; Cunha, André (2015-10-09), Conservação da biodiversidade com SIG, Oficina de Textos, ISBN 978-85-7975-115-8
- Silva, Michele Andreza P. da (August 2010), Plano Territorial de Desenvolvimento Rural Sustentável (PDF) (in Portuguese), Amazonas: Cáritas Arquidiocesana de Manaus
