= Rio Liberdade State Forest =

State forest in Acre, Brazil

- Location within Brazil
- Nearest city: Tarauacá, Acrel
- Coordinates: 8°03′36″S 71°49′16″W
- Area: 126,360 hectares (312,200 acres)
- Designation: State forest is a state forest in the state of Acre, Brazil.
- Created: 9 March 2004
- Administrator: Instituto de Meio Ambiente do Acre

The Rio Liberdade State Forest (Portuguese: Florestal Estadual do Rio Liberdade) is a state forest in the state of Acre, Brazil.

== Geography and ecology ==
Conservation units in the west of Acre.: 3. Rio Liberdade State Forest

The Rio Liberdade State Forest is in the municipality of Tarauacá in the state of Acre. It has an area of 126,360 hectares (312,200 acres). The forest is bounded to the north by the BR-364 highway and the Mogno State Forest. To the west it adjoins the Riozinho da Liberdade Extractive Reserve. The Igarapé Tarauaê, a tributary of the Gregório River, rises in the forest and flow to the northeast.

The climate is equatorial humid, with high rainfall distributed throughout the year and a marked rainy season between November and April.

The vegetation is dominated by dense tropical rainforest rich in hardwood species such as mahogany (*Swietenia macrophylla*), cedar (*Cedrela odorata*), and Brazil nut (*Bertholletia excelsa*). Non-timber forest products like natural rubber (*Hevea brasiliensis*) and açaí (*Euterpe precatoria*) are also widespread. The area provides habitat for a wide range of Amazonian fauna, including primates, tapirs, peccaries, macaws, and numerous amphibians and reptiles, reflecting the high biodiversity typical of Acre’s forests.

== History ==
The Rio Liberdade State Forest was created on 9 March 2004. The consultative council for the Rio Gregório State Forest complex was created by decree on 19 September 2008. This covers the Rio Gregório, Mogno and Rio Liberdade state forests, all of which had been created on the same date. The governor installed the council members in April 2012.

== People and economy ==
As of April 2012 there were 422 families in the Rio Gregório Forest Complex, which covered 480,000 hectares (1,200,000 acres) in total. The state's Department of Industry, Trade and Sustainable Services (SEDENS) had a number of plans for the complex. These included providing two new trucks to support the communities, making football fields in each community, providing coordinators to arrange meetings, resuming production of tree seedlings and providing assistance with family farming, small livestock and fish farming. Each family would get a concession of 100 hectares (250 acres) of which 20% could be cleared and the remainder used in a sustainable way. Wood processing factories were to be built in Cruzeiro do Sul and Tarauacá.

== Sources ==
- FES do Rio Liberdade (in Portuguese), ISA: Instituto Sociambiental
- "Governo instala Conselho no Complexo Florestal do Rio Gregório", A Gazeta do Acre (in Portuguese), 30 April 2012
- MOS Complexo de Florestas Estaduais do Rio Gregório (in Portuguese), ISA: Instituto Socioambiental
