= Tarauacá =

Municipality of Acre, Brazil

- Municipality
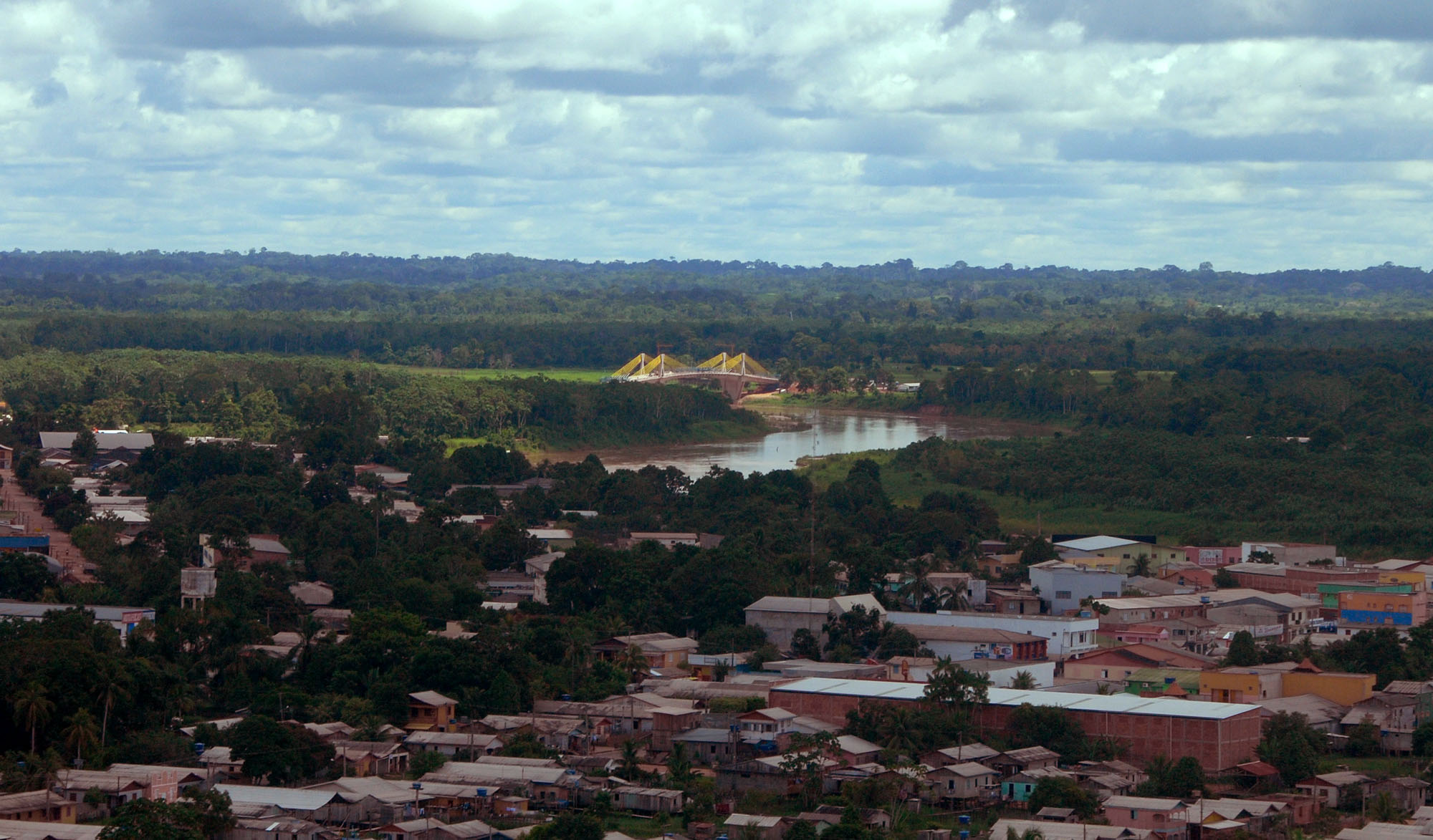
- Panoramic view of Downtown Tarauacá and Tarauacá River, Acre

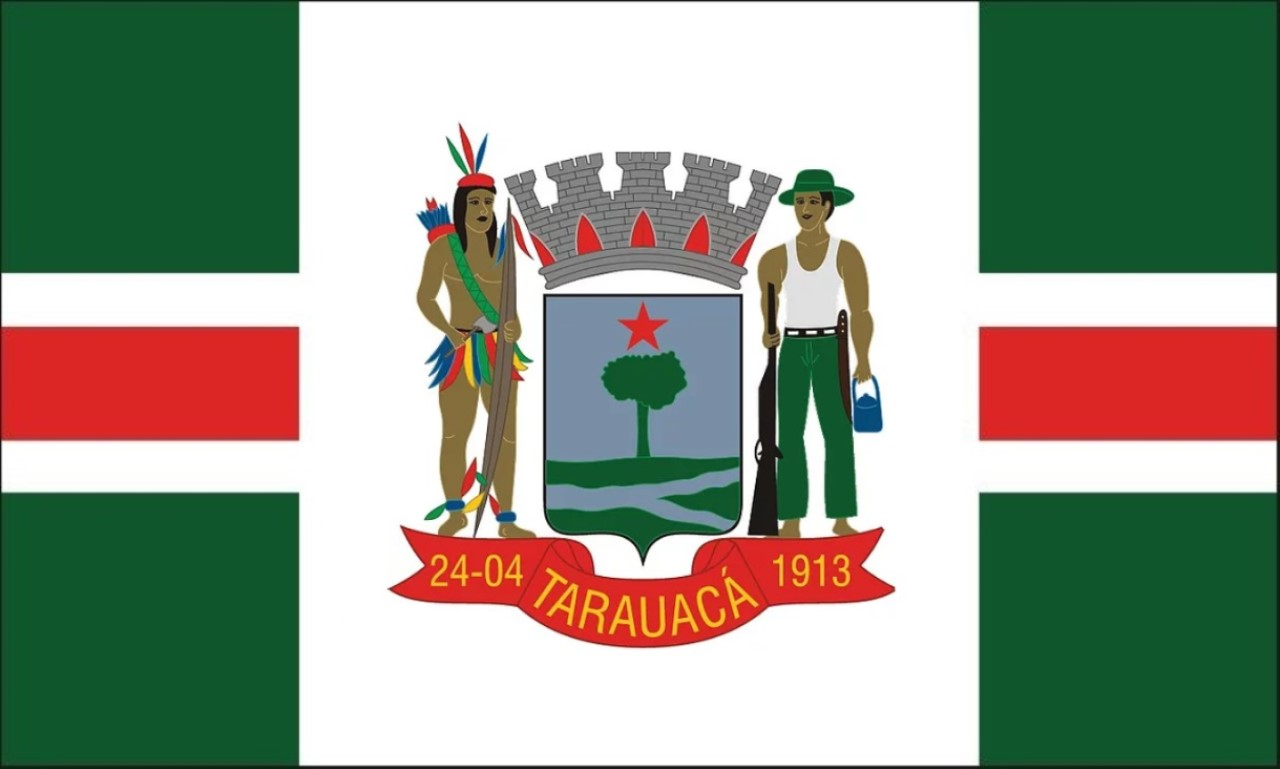
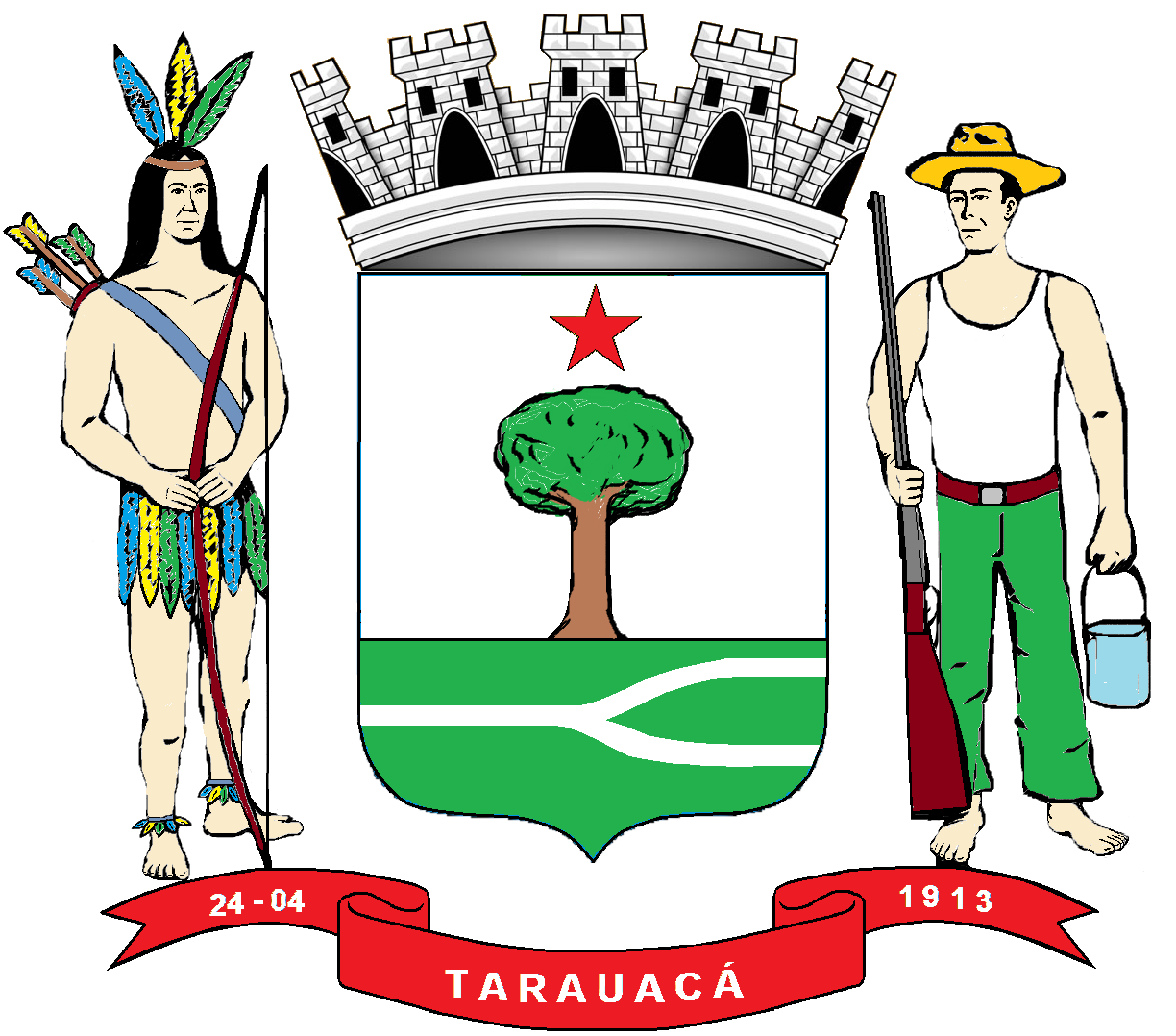
- Flag Coat of arms

- Location of municipality in Acre State

- Location in Brazil
- Coordinates: 08°09′39″S 70°45′57″W
- Country: Brazil
- Region: North
- State: Acre
- Demonym: tarauacaense
- Founded: January 1, 1907

Government
  - Mayor: Marilete Vitorino (SDP)

Area
  - Total: 6,005.213 sq mi (15,553.430 km^{2})
- Elevation: 551 ft (168 m)

Population (2020 est)
  - Total: 43,151
  - Density: 4.6/sq mi (1.76/km^{2})
- Time zone: UTC−5 (ACT)
- Postal code: 69970
- Area code: +55 (68)

Tarauacá (Brazilian Portuguese pronunciation: [taɾɐwaˈka]) is a municipality located in the northwest of the Brazilian state of Acre. Tarauacá has a population of 43,151 people and has an area 20,171 square kilometers (7,788 sq mi).

== Geography ==
The municipality contains 38% of the Alto Tarauacá Extractive Reserve, created in 2000. It contains the 216,062-hectare (533,900-acre) Rio Gregório State Forest, a sustainable use conservation unit created in 2004. It also contains the 143,897-hectare (355,580-acre) Mogno State Forest and the 126,360-hectare (312,200-acre) Rio Liberdade State Forest, two other sustainable use units created on the same date.

=== Climate ===
Climate data for Tarauaca, Acre, Brazil (1981–2010, extremes 1969–present)
| Month | Jan | Feb | Mar | Apr | May | Jun | Jul | Aug | Sep | Oct | Nov | Dec | Year |
|---|---|---|---|---|---|---|---|---|---|---|---|---|---|
| Record high °C (°F) | 36.0 (96.8) | 35.9 (96.6) | 35.7 (96.3) | 36.6 (97.9) | 34.8 (94.6) | 35.2 (95.4) | 38.1 (100.6) | 37.2 (99.0) | 39.7 (103.5) | 37.9 (100.2) | 36.5 (97.7) | 36.5 (97.7) | 39.7 (103.5) |
| Mean daily maximum °C (°F) | 31.1 (88.0) | 31.1 (88.0) | 31.3 (88.3) | 31.5 (88.7) | 30.9 (87.6) | 30.8 (87.4) | 31.8 (89.2) | 32.9 (91.2) | 33.2 (91.8) | 32.6 (90.7) | 31.8 (89.2) | 31.3 (88.3) | 31.7 (89.1) |
| Daily mean °C (°F) | 25.8 (78.4) | 25.9 (78.6) | 26.0 (78.8) | 25.8 (78.4) | 25.2 (77.4) | 24.7 (76.5) | 24.6 (76.3) | 25.5 (77.9) | 26.0 (78.8) | 26.4 (79.5) | 26.1 (79.0) | 25.9 (78.6) | 25.7 (78.3) |
| Mean daily minimum °C (°F) | 22.5 (72.5) | 22.4 (72.3) | 22.5 (72.5) | 22.2 (72.0) | 21.2 (70.2) | 20.0 (68.0) | 19.1 (66.4) | 19.5 (67.1) | 20.8 (69.4) | 22.0 (71.6) | 22.2 (72.0) | 22.5 (72.5) | 21.4 (70.5) |
| Record low °C (°F) | 11.8 (53.2) | 17.2 (63.0) | 16.6 (61.9) | 14.0 (57.2) | 13.5 (56.3) | 10.2 (50.4) | 6.5 (43.7) | 9.7 (49.5) | 10.0 (50.0) | 2.2 (36.0) | 2.4 (36.3) | 17.8 (64.0) | 2.2 (36.0) |
| Average precipitation mm (inches) | 281.7 (11.09) | 257.6 (10.14) | 326.8 (12.87) | 200.9 (7.91) | 135.9 (5.35) | 60.9 (2.40) | 48.7 (1.92) | 62.5 (2.46) | 112.0 (4.41) | 193.1 (7.60) | 262.3 (10.33) | 270.5 (10.65) | 2,212.9 (87.12) |
| Average precipitation days (≥ 1.0 mm) | 19 | 17 | 19 | 15 | 13 | 7 | 5 | 6 | 8 | 14 | 15 | 19 | 157 |
| Average relative humidity (%) | 87.1 | 87.5 | 88.0 | 86.7 | 86.2 | 85.5 | 82.4 | 80.0 | 80.4 | 83.7 | 86.1 | 87.0 | 85.1 |
| Mean monthly sunshine hours | 104.2 | 87.3 | 96.9 | 122.6 | 141.8 | 155.5 | 204.6 | 187.0 | 163.3 | 159.2 | 129.1 | 104.7 | 1,656.2 |
Source 1: Instituto Nacional de Meteorologia
Source 2: Meteo Climat (record highs and lows)

== Economy ==
In 2017, Tarauacá had per capita GDP of 11.763,89 R$, total revenue of 71.657.950 R$, and total expenses of 63.519.410 R$.

== Transportation ==
Tarauacá is served by José Galera dos Santos Airport. It is a small airport.
