= Concha d'Ostra Sustainable Development Reserve =

- Reserva Estadual de Desenvolvimento Sustentável Concha d'Ostra
- IUCN category VI (protected area with sustainable use of natural resources)
- Location within Brazil
- Nearest city: Guarapari, Espírito Santo
- Coordinates: 20.678562°S 40.528232°W
- Area: 953.5 hectares (2,356 acres)
- Designation: Sustainable development reserve
- Administrator: IEMA: Instituto Estadual de Meio Ambiente e Recursos Hídricos

The Concha d'Ostra Sustainable Development Reserve (Portuguese: Reserva Estadual de Desenvolvimento Sustentável Concha d'Ostra) is a sustainable development reserve in the state of Espírito Santo, Brazil.

== Location ==
The Concha d'Ostra Sustainable Development Reserve is in the municipality of Guarapari, Espírito Santo. It has an area of 953.5 hectares (2,356 acres). The area is mainly covered by mangroves but also includes some coastal forest. Economically important fauna are crustaceans and molluscs, and fish such as sea bass and mullet. The proximity to the city of Guarapari makes it a challenge to manage the reserve and maintain its integrity. During the closed season the capture, transport and marketing of crabs is prohibited, and surveillance by SEMA is increased.

== History ==
The Concha d'Ostra Sustainable Development Reserve was originally created as an ecological station in 2003. It became part of the Central Atlantic Forest Ecological Corridor, created in 2002. It was recategorized as a sustainable development reserve by state law 8464 of March 2007. The purpose is to protect the estuarine mangroves of the Bay of Guarapari, an important breeding area for several species of fish and crustaceans, while allowing the sustainable use of these natural resources by the traditional residents.

The management council was formed in October 2010. In December 2012 IEMA and the municipality of Guarapari agreed on a R$2 million project to build physical barriers, wooden walkways and gardens in an effort to stem the constant invasions and illegal housing construction that was threatening the reserve.

== Sources ==
- Cacá Lima (October 2010), Conselho Gestor é criado para a Reserva de Concha D’Ostra (in Portuguese)
- "Iema repassa R$ 2 milhões para Guarapari investir na proteção de manguezais", Folha Vitória (in Portuguese), 8 January 2013
- Lamas, Ivana Reis; Crepaldi, Maria Otávia; Mesquita, Carlos Alberto Bernardo (2015), Uma Rede no Corredor (PDF) (in Portuguese), Conservação Internacional (CI-Brasil), ISBN 978-85-98830-28-5
- Manguezal do Concha D’Ostra, um jardim suspenso sobre as águas de Guarapari (in Portuguese), Prefeitura de Guarapari, archived from the original on 2016-10-28
- RDS de Concha D'Ostra (in Portuguese), IEMA: Instituto Estadual de Meio Ambiente e Recursos Hídricos, archived from the original on 2016-10-28
