= Novo River (Matupiri) =

River in Brazil

- Location within Brazil
- Native name: Rio Novo (Portuguese)

Location
- Country: Brazil

Physical characteristics
- Mouth
  - coordinates: 5.299638°S 61.853523°W

The Novo River (Portuguese: Rio Novo is a river of the state of Amazonas, Brazil. It is one of the headwaters of the Matupiri River.

The Matupiri River forms in the 217,109 hectares (536,490 acres) Rio Amapá Sustainable Development Reserve where the Jutaí River and Novo rivers converge.

== See also ==
- List of rivers of Amazonas
