= Borba, Amazonas =

Municipality of Amazonas, Brazil

Borba
- Municipality
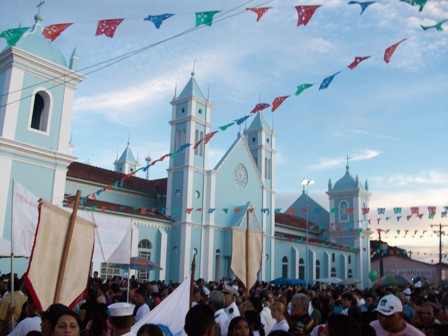

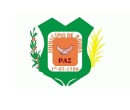
- Flag Coat of arms

- Amazonas state with Borba municipality in red

- Location in Brazil
- Coordinates: 4°23′16″S 59°35′38″W
- Country: Brazil
- Region: North
- State: Amazonas

Area
  - Total: 44,251 km^{2} (17,085 sq mi)

Population (2020)
  - Total: 41,748
- Time zone: UTC−4 (AMT)

Borba is a municipality in the state of Amazonas in northern Brazil.

== Geography ==
Borba is located on the banks of the Madeira River around 150 km (93 mi) south of Manaus. Its population was 41,748 (2020) and its area is 44,251 km^{2}. The city is the seat of the Territorial Prelature of Borba.

The municipality contains 46% of the 283,117-hectare (699,600-acre) Rio Madeira Sustainable Development Reserve, created in 2006. It contains about 10% of the 513,747-hectare (1,269,500-acre) Matupiri State Park, created in 2009 along the Matupiri River. It fully contains the 179,083-hectare (442,520-acre) Matupiri Sustainable Development Reserve, created in 2009. It contain 21% of the 397,557-hectare (982,380-acre) Igapó-Açu Sustainable Development Reserve, also created in 2009. Borba also contains about 60% of the 896,411-hectare (2,215,080-acre) Acari National Park created by president Dilma Rousseff in 2016 in the last week before her provisional removal from office.

== History ==
Founded in 1728 as the Jesuit mission Aldea Trocano by Portuguese Padre João Sampaio. In 1755, it became the first vila (Portuguese town) in what was then the new captaincy of Rio Negro, named Borba.

== Economy ==
The economy of Borba depends largely on fishing, agriculture, and extractive activities like rubber extraction and cocoa harvesting.

The city is served by Borba Airport.
