= Maués =

Municipality of Amazonas, Brazil

- Municipality
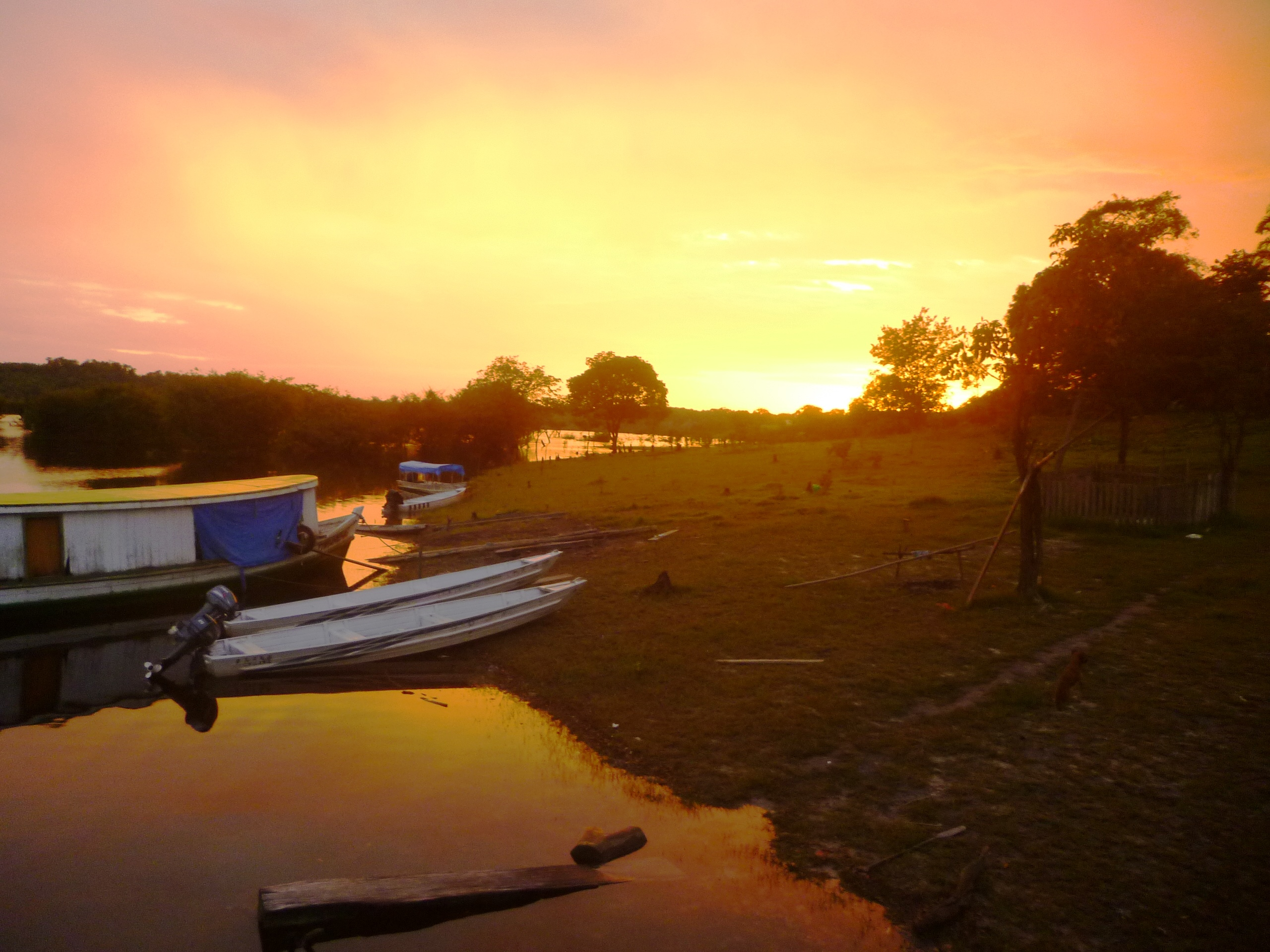
- Sunset on the island Michilhes, within the municipality of Maués, Brazil.

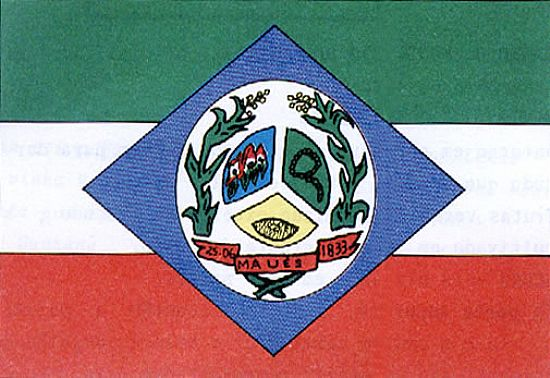
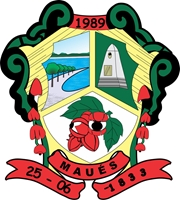
- Flag Coat of arms
- Motto(s): Terra do guaraná Land of Guaraná
- Location of the municipality inside Amazonas

- Location in Brazil
- Coordinates: 3°23′1″S 57°43′7″W
- Country: Brazil
- Region: North
- State: Amazonas

Government
  - Mayor: Carlos Roberto de Oliveira Júnior (PROS)

Area
  - Total: 39,988.394 km^{2} (15,439.605 sq mi)

Population (2020)
  - Total: 65,040
  - Density: 1.31/km^{2} (3.4/sq mi)
- Time zone: UTC−4 (AMT)

Maués is a municipality located in the Brazilian state of Amazonas. Its population was 65,040 (2020) and its area is 39,988 km^{2}.

== Geography ==
Maués is located on the eastern bank of the Maués-Açu River. It is known as the "Land of Guaraná". There are sandy beaches, and Maues summer festival and Guarana festival. The Mundurucus and Maues Indians cultivated the guarana fruit, which is the basis for the famous Brazilian soft drink. Maués means "talking parrots" and it is originated from one of the Indian clans in the region. Maués has 22.000 inhabitants with another 20.000 natives spread along 140 river villages. The area's 20.000 people are distributed within 140 villages spread along the rivers.It can be reached from Manaus (267 km away) by regional boat (18 hours), fast boat (7 hours) or plane (45 min.). Maués is used as a starting point for adventure trekking including visit to the Amana waterfall, old goldmines, caves, exploration of primary jungle with Indian guides and visit to the Uraira developing reserve.

Maués Airport serves the region.

=== Conservation ===
The municipality contains all or part of the Alto Maués Ecological Station, Amazônia National Park, Juruena National Park, Pau-Rosa National Forest, Maués State Forest and Andirá Marau Indigenous Territory. It is thought that the area has high gold mining potential. The municipality contains the 538,081-hectare (1,329,630-acre) Urupadi National Forest, a sustainable use conservation unit created in 2016. It includes the 59,137-hectare (146,130-acre) Urariá Sustainable Development Reserve, created in 2001.

== Cultivation of guaraná ==
One of the things Maués is known for is guaraná, and every year they celebrate this with the Guaraná festival. The festival typically includes live music, especially the local pagode dance which will involve the whole city in the festivities. The guarana fruit is used in the traditional Brazilian soft drink, sold in several varieties in Brazil. These soft drinks are now also exported to outside countries, and the guaraná is becoming a known ingredient in drinks for boosting energy.

== Notable people ==
- Homero de Miranda Leão (1913–1987), poet, teacher and politician
