= Borba Airport =

Borba Airport Aeroporto de Borba
- IATA: RBB; ICAO: SWBR; LID: AM0018

Summary
- Airport type: Public
- Serves: Borba
- Time zone: BRT−1 (UTC−04:00)
- Elevation AMSL: 30 m (98 ft)
- Coordinates: 04°24′22″S 059°36′09″W

Map
- Location in Brazil

Runways
| Direction | Length | | Surface |
| Direction | m | ft | Surface |
|---|---|---|---|
| 12/30 | 1,200 | 3,937 | Asphalt |
- Sources: ANAC, DECEA

Borba Airport (IATA: RBB, ICAO: SWBR) is the airport serving Borba, Brazil.

== Access ==
The airport is located 3 km (2 mi) from downtown Borba.

== See also ==
- List of airports in Brazil
