= Matupiri State Park =

State park in Amazonas, Brazil

- Parque Estadual do Matupiri
- IUCN category II (national park)
- Location within Brazil
- Location: Brazil
- Nearest city: Manicoré, Amazonas
- Coordinates: 5°13′20″S 61°18′52″W
- Area: 513,747 hectares (1,269,500 acres)
- Designation: State park
- Created: March 27, 2009
- Administrator: Secretaria de Estado de Meio Ambiente e Desenvolvimento Sustentável do Amazonas

Matupiri State Park (Portuguese: Parque Estadual do Matupiri) is a state park in the state of Amazonas, Brazil. It protects a rich area of Amazon rainforest and an ecologically important area of woodland savanna along the Matupiri River. Unusually for a state park, it includes an "indigenous special use zone" that allows the Mura people to continue to fish and extract forest products, as they have for many generations.

== Location ==
Conservation units in the Purus-Madeira interfluvial.: 16. Matupiri State Park

Matupiri State Park is divided between the municipalities of Borba (9.95%) and Manicoré (90.05%) in the state of Amazonas. It has an area of 513,747 hectares (1,269,500 acres). The park is to the south of the BR-319 highway. It is in the Médio Madeira microregion of Amazonas.

The park is in the Purus - Madeira inter-fluvial region, in the basins of the Matupiri and Amapá rivers. The Matupiri river runs through the centre of the park from southwest to northeast, and provides the main way to access the interior of the park. To the southeast it adjoins the Rio Madeira Sustainable Development Reserve. To the south it adjoins the PAE Jenipapo settlement. To the southwest it is bounded by the AM-464 highway, and borders the Rio Amapá Sustainable Development Reserve. To the north it borders the Igapó-Açu Sustainable Development Reserve, which contains the zone affected by BR-319. To the northeast it adjoins the Cunhã-Sapucaia Indigenous Territory and the Matupiri Sustainable Development Reserve.

== Environment ==
The park is part of an important ecological corridor in the region between the Purus and Madeira rivers in combination with the Nascentes do Lago Jari National Park, Apurinã do Igarapé Tauamirim Indigenous Territory, Abufari Biological Reserve and Piagaçu-Purus Sustainable Development Reserve on the Purus River and the Lago do Capanã Grande Extractive Reserve and Rio Amapá Sustainable Development Reserve near the Madeira.

The park is 91% covered by dense lowland rainforest with emergent canopy, and 7% by grassy wooded savanna, or Amazon campina, without gallery forest. The savannah/campina area is ecologically very important, holding species unique to this type of environment. As of 2005 just 407 hectares (1,010 acres) had been deforested, or 0.08% of the total area. No further deforestation was observed from then until 2010.

Two possibly new species of fish have been identified and three possibly new species of herpetofauna. There are six species of birds endemic to the Purus-Madeira inter-fluvial. There are healthy populations of species that are extensively hunted such as South American tapir (Tapirus terrestris), white-lipped peccary (Tayassu pecari), collared peccary (Pecari tajacu), brocket deer (Mazama species) and gray woolly monkey (Lagothrix cana).

== History ==
Matupiri State Park was created by Amazonas state decree 28424 of 27 March 2009. The park was created with participation of the Mura, who occupy the Cunhã-Sapucaia Indigenous Territory adjacent to the east of the park, with an innovative model of sharing management of the park with the indigenous people. A zone of special indigenous use was defined in the management plan. The management plan was approved on 22 July 2014. As of 2016 the park was supported by the Amazon Region Protected Areas Program.

== Indigenous special use zone ==
The Mura people occupy the Cunhã-Sapucaia Indigenous Territory lower down along the Matupiri River, the primary route for accessing the park. The 2006 study of the creation of the Matupiri Igapó-Açu Mosaic of Conservation Areas did not account for these people, who were noted only for "invading" fishing lakes in the Igapó-Acu Sustainable Development Reserve. The Mura claimed they should be recognised as historical protectors of the Matupiri river basin and users of its natural resources. When monitoring of the park began in 2011 traces of Mura presence were indeed found, including house structures, wood work areas and capoeira vegetation in early succession stages.

The Mura have traditionally used the park as a source of wood for their homes and boats, and of Brazil nuts, lianas, copaiba and andiroba oils, açaí, buriti, bacaba, patauá and honey. They have also used it for fishing, and have acted as guides for sports fishing tourists. Creation of the park has caused a drop by almost 50% of tourism revenue. There was no legal precedent in Brazil for allowing indigenous people to use the resources of a state park, but Colombia and Peru had defined relevant principles. To avoid ongoing conflicts and to recognise the conservation role of the Mura people, the management plan recognised the Indigenous Special Use Zone (ZUEI) in the park, basically consisting of land along the major rivers and streams upstream from the indigenous territory.

== Sources ==
- Full list: PAs supported by ARPA, ARPA
- PARNA Nascentes do Lago Jari (in Portuguese), ISA: Instituto Socioambiental
- Paulo Amaral; Andréia Pinto; Izabella da Paixão Gomes; Carlos Alexandre da Cunha; Rodney Salomão; Gabriela Galetti (2012), "Parque Estadual do Matupiri" (PDF), Áreas Protegidas no Sul do Estado do Amazonas (in Portuguese), Belém, PA: Imazon, archived from the original (PDF) on 2016-08-18
- PES do Matupiri (in Portuguese), ISA: Instituto Socioambiental
- Sakagawa, Sergio; Pereira dos Santos & Stancik, Henrique; Franzen, Juliane, Deposition: Indigenous special use zone in Matupiri State Park (AM), ISA
