= Gregório River (Amazonas) =

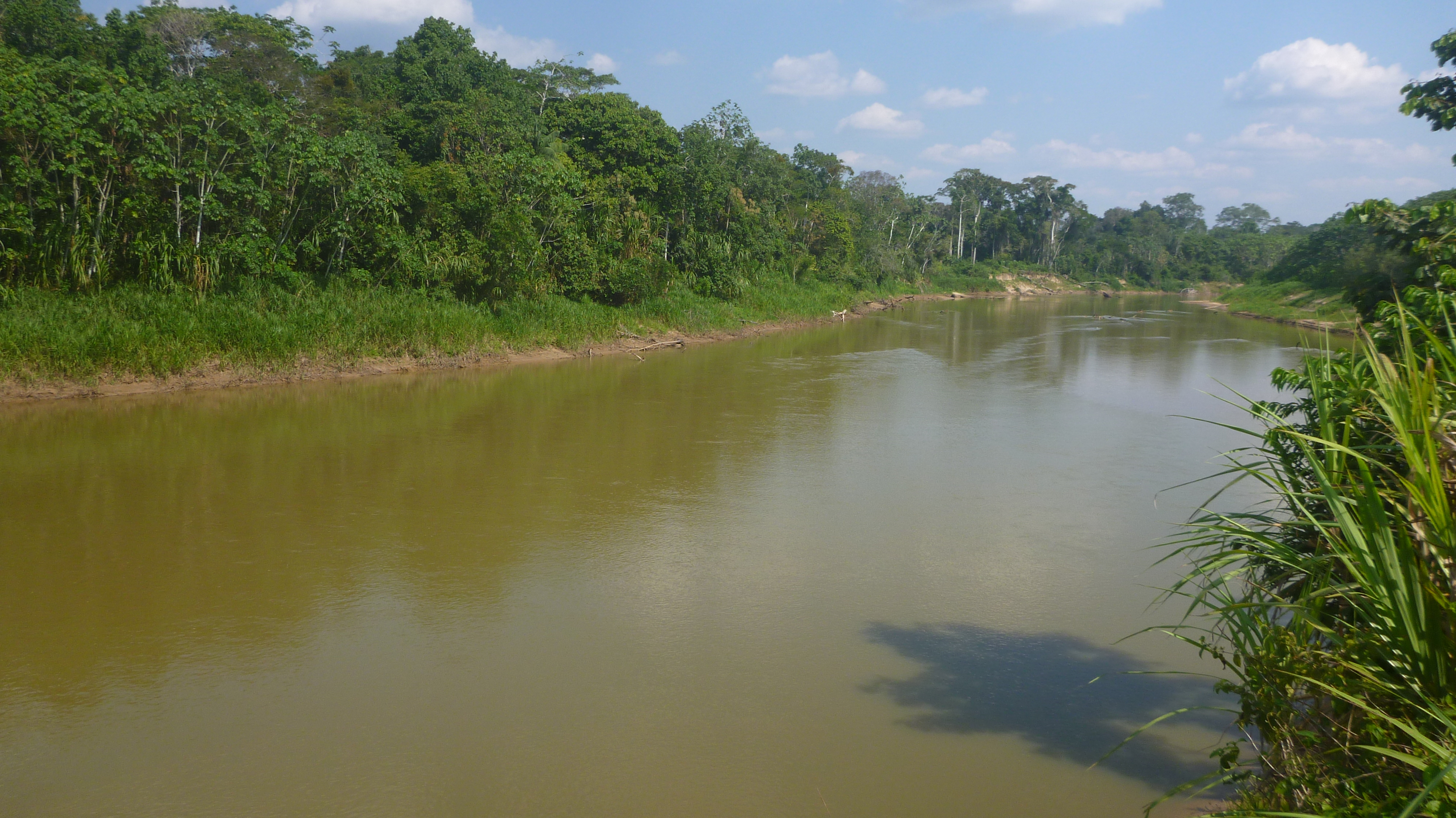

- Location within Brazil
- Native name: Rio Gregório (Portuguese)

Location
- Country: Brazil

Physical characteristics
- Source
  - location: Acre
- Mouth
  - location: Eirunepé, Amazonas
  - coordinates: 6.815919°S 70.642425°W
- Length: 350 kilometres (220 mi)

The Gregório River (Portuguese: Rio Gregório) is a river of Amazonas and Acre states in western Brazil. It is a tributary of Juruá River.

== Course ==
The Gregório River runs in a northeast direction through the Brazilian states of Acre and Amazonas. It has a length total of 350 km (220 mi). In Acre between the BR-364 highway and the Amazonas border the river forms the boundary between the 216,062 hectares (533,900 acres) Rio Gregório State Forest to the east and the 143,897 hectares (355,580 acres) Mogno State Forest to the west, two sustainable use conservation units created in 2004. Across the border in Amazonas the river runs through the 427,004 hectares (1,055,150 acres) Rio Gregório Extractive Reserve, which protects 80% of the sources of the river.

== See also ==
- List of rivers of Acre
- List of rivers of Amazonas (Brazilian state)
