= RBBS =

RBBS may refer to:

- Robert Bradley's Blackwater Surprise
- Republic Bashkir Boarding School
- RBBS-PC, a bulletin board system
