= Parauari River =

- Location within Brazil
- Native name: Rio Parauari (Portuguese)

Location
- Country: Brazil

Physical characteristics
- Source
  - location: Amazonas
- Mouth
  - coordinates: 4.375692°S 57.593404°W

Basin features
- River system: Maués Açu River

Parauari River is a tributary of the Maués Açu River of Amazonas state in north-western Brazil. It lies about 300 km southeast of Manaus, the capital.

The river flows through the eastern part of the Alto Maués Ecological Station. It combines with the Amanã River to form the Maués Açu River.

== See also ==
- List of rivers of Amazonas
