= Matupiri River =

River in Brazil

- Location within Brazil
- Native name: Rio Matupiri (Portuguese)

Location
- Country: Brazil

Physical characteristics
- Source
  - location: Amazonas state
  - coordinates: 5.299045°S 61.852710°W
- Mouth
  - coordinates: 4.539598°S 60.469697°W

The Matupiri River (Portuguese: Rio Matupiri) is a river of Amazonas state in north-western Brazil. It is a tributary of the Igapó-Açu River.

== Course ==
The Matupiri River forms in the 217,109 hectares (536,490 acres) Rio Amapá Sustainable Development Reserve where the Jutaí and Novo rivers converge. The Matupiri River runs through the centre of the Matupiri State Park from southwest to northeast, and provides the main way to access the interior of the park. It then runs through the northwest corner of the Matupiri Sustainable Development Reserve and then through the Cunhã-Sapucaia Indigenous Territory, within which it enters the Igapó-Açu River.

== See also ==
- List of rivers of Amazonas
