= Rio Madeira Sustainable Development Reserve =

Sustainable development reserve in Amazonas, Brazil

- Reserva de Desenvolvimento Sustentável do Rio Madeira
- IUCN category VI (protected area with sustainable use of natural resources)
- Location within Brazil
- Nearest city: Novo Aripuanã, Amazonas
- Coordinates: 5°04′33″S 60°29′31″W
- Area: 283,117 hectares (699,600 acres)
- Designation: Sustainable development reserve
- Created: 3 July 2006
- Administrator: Secretaria de Estado do Meio Ambiente do Amazonas

The Rio Madeira Sustainable Development Reserve (Portuguese: Reserva de Desenvolvimento Sustentável do Rio Madeira) is a sustainable development reserve in the state of Amazonas, Brazil.

== Location ==
Conservation units in the Purus-Madeira interfluvial.: 18. Rio Madeira Sustainable Development Reserve

The Rio Madeira Sustainable Development Reserve is divided between the municipalities of Manicoré (15.22%), Borba (46.1%) and Novo Aripuanã (38.68%) in the state of Amazonas. It has an area of 283,117 hectares (699,600 acres). The reserve is contiguous to other conservation units that make up the Matupiri-Igapó Açu mosaic. The reserve extends along the left (northwest) bank of the Madeira River. The town of Novo Aripuanã on the right bank is opposite the centre of the reserve. It adjoins the Matupiri State Park to the north of the western section, and the Matupiri Sustainable Development Reserve to the north of the eastern section. It is bounded to the east by the Arary Indigenous Territory.

== Environment ==
The reserve is drained by the "white water" Madeira River, which flows from Porto Velho in the state of Rondônia to the Amazon River below Manaus in Amazonas. The vegetation of the Madeira-Purus interfluvial, in which the reserve is located, is of great importance for conserving biodiversity, with endemic species that are potentially vulnerable to anthropogenic threats, particularly birds. The varied environments include campinas and campinaranas, which conserve a variety of species of flora and fauna and are refuges of the Pleistocene. Vegetation in the reserve includes dense lowland rainforest with emergent canopy and alluvial forests along the streams.

== Economy ==
The reserve has 25 communities with about 480 families. The traditional populations are descendants of rubber tappers. The main economic activity is agriculture, with bananas being the main commercial crop, and Brazil nuts also gathered for sale. Other possible economic resources include timber, copaiba and cumara. The area has high potential for ecotourism.

== History ==
The Rio Madeira Sustainable Development Reserve was created by Amazonas state decree 26.009 of 3 July 2006 with the objectives of preserving nature, ensuring continuation and improvement of methods of extracting natural resources and quality of life of the traditional populations, and preserving and enhancing knowledge and techniques for managing the environment developed by the traditional population and others.

On 12 November 2007 the Instituto Nacional de Colonização e Reforma Agrária (INCRA – National Institute for Colonisation and Agrarian Reform) recognised the reserve as meeting the needs of 388 small families, who would qualify for PRONAF support. This was revised to 550 families on 11 December 2007. The deliberative council was created on 1 February 2010. The Bolsa Floresta program was extended to the residents in 2010, providing some income to families and community associations and other support in exchange for environmental stewardship. The management plan was approved on 22 July 2014. As of 2016 the reserve was supported by the Amazon Region Protected Areas Program.

== Sources ==
- Full list: PAs supported by ARPA, ARPA
- RDS do Rio Madeira (in Portuguese), ISA: Instituto Socioambiental
- Virgilio M. Viana (December 2008), "Bolsa Floresta (Forest Conservation Allowance): An innovative mechanism to promote health in traditional communities in the Amazon" (PDF), Estud. Av., 22 (64), São Paulo, ISSN 1806-9592
