= Campina (biome) =

Neotropical ecoregion in the Amazon biome

Campina is a Neotropical ecoregion found in the Amazon biome. It refers to vegetation that grows on infertile sandy soil with poor drainage. The term may be used to include open forest, shrubland and meadow, or may be restricted to treeless meadows.

== Open forest ==
The term campina is related to campinarana. The meaning of both is "wild field", and some consider that they are the same. The terms campina and campinarana both describe white sand savannas that are very poor in nutrients. They may be flooded periodically or seasonally, in which case the roots suffer from lack of aeration. The vegetation is stunted. Amazon campinas are defined as open forest on sandy soil where sunlight can reach the ground. More than half the species of orchid in the Amazon lowlands are found in this type of forest. The campina areas of the Amazon have a flowering peak in the dry season.

== Treeless shrubland or meadow ==
For others, campina is distinguished as being completely treeless. The term "campinarana" is used for the transition between campina and the rainforest. One author distinguishes between a campina shrubland and scrubby campinarana forest, both of which grow on white sand soil typically associated with large stream gullies. In this view the campinarana is a pseudo-campina and, "is, in fact, neither a campina nor a true, dense forest...".

A Brazilian forestry institute defines campina as a type of terrestrial biome consisting of open fields, completely denuded of trees. The meadows may occur in natural conditions, or may be man-made. These areas are low in varieties of species, but have high numbers of endemic species. A description of the Uatumã Sustainable Development Reserve states that campinas and campinaranas are abundant but very fragile, mainly due to their sandy soil. They have many endemic species. The campinas have tourist potential due to their scenic beauty and large numbers of bromeliads and orchids.

== Sources ==
- Ab'Sáber, Aziz Nacib (1996), Amazônia: do discurso à práxis, EdUSP, ISBN 978-85-314-0091-9
- Instituto Florestal (1977), Publicacão I.F., Secretaria de Estado dos Negócios da Agricultura, Coordenadoria da Pesquisa de Recursos Naturais
- Kahn, Francis; Granville, Jean-Jacques de (2012-12-06), Palms in Forest Ecosystems of Amazonia, Springer Science & Business Media, ISBN 978-3-642-76852-1
- Laurance, William F. (2001), "The Hyper-Diverse Flora of the Central Amazon", Lessons from Amazonia: The Ecology and Conservation of a Fragmented Forest, Yale University Press, ISBN 978-0-300-12749-2
- Miranda, Francisco (2014), "Habitats of the large-flowered Cattleya species in Brazil", Renziana Vol. 4: Cattleya, vol. 4, Schweizerische Orchideenstiftung, GGKEY:SYBKXNW1QC1
- "Regiões Fitoecológicas - Campinarana", Ambiente Brasil (in Portuguese), 9 January 2009
- Schulte, Andreas; Ruhiyat, Daddy (2013-03-14), Soils of Tropical Forest Ecosystems: Characteristics, Ecology and Management, Springer Science & Business Media, ISBN 978-3-662-03649-5
- Schwartz, Mark (2013-07-30), Phenology: An Integrative Environmental Science, Springer Science & Business Media, ISBN 978-94-007-6925-0
- Secretaria de Planejamento (1975), Tipos e aspectos do Brasil: excertos da Revista brasileira de geografia, Secretaria de Planejamento da Presidência da República, Fundação Instituto Brasileiro de Geografia e Estatística, Directoria Técnica, Departamento de Documentação e Divulgação Geográfica e Cartográfica
- Sioli, H. (2012-12-06), The Amazon: Limnology and landscape ecology of a mighty tropical river and its basin, Springer Science & Business Media, ISBN 978-94-009-6542-3
- Smith, Nigel (2014-09-26), Palms and People in the Amazon, Springer, ISBN 978-3-319-05509-1
- Sobre a RDS (in Portuguese), RDS do Uatumã, archived from the original on 2016-09-17
