= Piagaçu-Purus Sustainable Development Reserve =

- Reserva de Desenvolvimento Sustentável Piagaçu-Purus
- IUCN category VI (protected area with sustainable use of natural resources)
- Location within Brazil
- Nearest city: Anori, Amazonas
- Coordinates: 4°52′27″S 62°39′39″W
- Area: 1,008,167 hectares (2,491,230 acres)
- Designation: Sustainable development reserve
- Created: 5 September 2003
- Administrator: Secretaria de Estado do Meio Ambiente do Amazonas

Piagaçu-Purus Sustainable Development Reserve (Portuguese: Reserva de Desenvolvimento Sustentável Piagaçu-Purus) is a sustainable development reserve in the state of Amazonas, Brazil.

== Location ==
Conservation units in the Purus-Madeira interfluvial.: 12. Piagaçu-Purus Sustainable Development Reserve

The Piagaçu-Purus Sustainable Development Reserve (RDS) is divided between the municipalities of Tapauá (30.35%), Coari (1.37%), Anori (40.11%) and Beruri (28.17%) in the state of Amazonas. It covers an area of 1,008,167 hectares (2,491,230 acres). The name comes from the Tupi language: pi'á (guts, heart or stomach) and wa'su (large, wide), and means "great heart of the Purus". There are about 85 communities of people in the reserve, who live by fishing, agriculture, hunting and extraction of timber and non-timber products.

The RDS adjoins the Abufari Biological Reserve to the southwest and the Nascentes do Lago Jari National Park to the south. The southern part of the RDS surrounds the Itixi Mitari Indigenous Territory, and further north the RDS surrounds the Lago Aiapuá Indigenous Territory. The Purus River runs through the RDS from southwest to northeast. The RDS contains Lago Jarí, which forms part of the eastern boundary of the southern section. The northern part of the RDS includes Lago Aiapuá. The RDS is accessible by boat.

== History ==
The Piagaçu-Purus Sustainable Development Reserve was created by decree 23.723 of 5 September 2003, incorporating the Lago do Ayapuá Environmental Protection Area of the middle Purus River. It covered parts of the Anori, Beruri and Tapauá municipalities on the banks of the Purus, and part of the Coari municipality on the banks of the Solimões River. It increased the protected area from 610,000 hectares (1,500,000 acres) to 1,008,167 hectares (2,491,230 acres). Indigenous territories were excluded from the area of the RDS.

On 27 December 2006 the Instituto Nacional de Colonização e Reforma Agrária (INCRA: National Institute for Colonization and Agrarian Reform) recognised the reserve with an area of 617,371 hectares (1,525,560 acres) as meeting the needs of 700 families of rural farmers, who could thus participate in PRONAF. This was amended to 990 families on 10 October 2008. The consultative council was created on 11 March 2010. The management plan was published on 31 December 2010, although it was not made official through an ordinance or legislative instrument.

Scientific research is conducted through cooperation between IPAAM/SDS and the Instituto Piagaçu, with a floating support base on Lago Ayapuá. As of 2016 the reserve was covered by the Amazon Region Protected Areas Program.

== Environment ==
The RDS a large part of the 2,100,000 hectares (5,200,000 acres) of floodplain of the Purus River, and contains over 200 lakes. About 40% of the RDS is floodplain and 60% terra firma forest, but the flat relief and homogeneous vegetation suggest that the dry land has been flooded in the recent past. The RDS has high biological importance, with great biodiversity of fish and all the known species of aquatic mammals in the Amazon including Amazon river dolphin (Inia geoffrensis), tucuxi (Sotalia fluviatilis), Amazonian manatee (Trichechus inunguis), neotropical otter (Lontra longicaudis) and giant otter (Pteronura brasiliensis). There are large populations of turtles and alligators. The wetlands and várzea fields are feeding areas for migratory birds, of which 40 species have been registered including 17 species that eat only fish. It holds the most species of primates of any Amazon reserve, with at least 13 identified species.

== Sources ==
- Full list: PAs supported by ARPA, ARPA
- RDS Piagaçu-Purus (in Portuguese), ISA: Instituto Socioambiental
