= Instituto Nacional de Colonização e Reforma Agrária =

Brazilian federal government agency

- Instituto Nacional de Colonização e Reforma Agrária

Agency overview
- Formed: July 9, 1970
- Headquarters: Brasília
- Agency executive: Profª.Maria Lucia de Oliveira Falcón Ph.D., President
- Parent department: Ministry of Agrarian Development
- Website: http://www.gov.br/incra/

The Instituto Nacional de Colonização e Reforma Agrária - INCRA (National Institute for Colonization and Agrarian Reform) is a federal government authority of the public administration of Brazil. INCRA administers the land reform issues.

Its headquarters is at Edifício Palácio do Desenvolvimento in the federal capital of Brasília.

== Structure ==
- Directorate of Development and Consolidation of Settlement Projects
- Strategic Management Department
- Operational Management Department
- Directorate of Land Governance
- Directorate of Quilombola Territories
