= Curuçá River (Javari River tributary) =

Location
- Country: Brazil

Physical characteristics
- Source: Vale do Javari Indigenous Land, Atalaia do Norte, State of Amazonas
  - location: Sierra del Divisor
  - coordinates: 6°53′19.3776″S 72°58′9.8004″W
  - elevation: 180 m (590 ft)
- Mouth: Javary River
  - coordinates: 4°26′47″S 71°24′16″W
  - elevation: 75 m (246 ft)
- Length: 530 km (330 mi)
- Basin size: 24,351 km^{2} (9,402 sq mi)
- Discharge
  - location: Seringal Santa Maria, Amazonas (near mouth)
  - average: (Period: 1970-1996) 942 m^{3}/s (33,300 cu ft/s)

Basin features
- Tributaries
  - left: Pardo
  - right: Arrojo

The Curuçá River is a river in Amazonas state in northwestern Brazil. It flows entirely within the municipality of Atalaia do Norte. The Curuçá is a left tributary of the Javary River.

== 1930 Curuçá River event ==
On August 13, 1930, the area near latitude 5° S and longitude 71.5° W experienced a meteoric air burst, also known as the Brazilian Tunguska event. The mass of the meteorite was estimated at between 1,000 and 25,000 short tons (910 and 22,680 t), with an energy release estimated between 0.1 and 5 megatons, significantly smaller than the Tunguska event.

== See also ==
- Curuçá
- List of rivers of Amazonas (Brazilian state)
