= List of rivers of Amazonas (Brazilian state) =

A list of rivers in Amazonas (Brazilian state).

The list is arranged by drainage basin, with respective tributaries indented under each larger stream's name and ordered from downstream to upstream. Amazonas is located entirely within the Amazon basin.

== By drainage basin ==
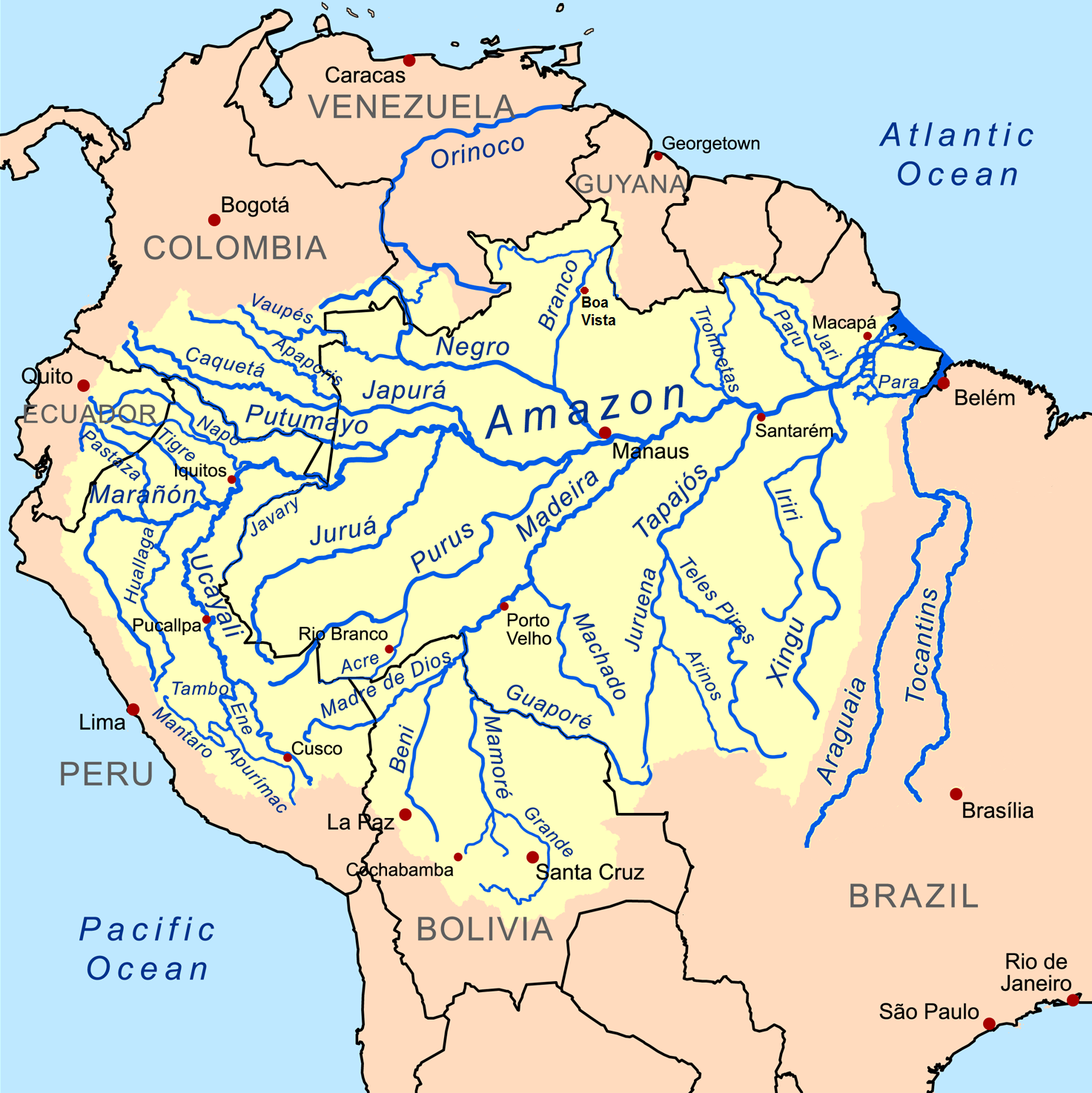
Amazon River basin

- Amazon River (includes the Solimões River)
  - Tapajós River
    - Juruena River
      - Bararati River
  - Nhamundá River
    - Piratucu River
  - Mamuru River
    - Uaicurapa River
  - Andirá River
  - Paraná Urariá (Amazon and Madeira side channel)
    - Maués Açu River
      - Urupadi River
      - Amanã River
      - Paracori River
      - Parauari River
    - Apoquitaua River
    - Paraconi River
    - Abacaxis River
      - Marimari River
    - Canumã River
      - Mapiá Grande River
      - Acari River
      - Camaiú River
      - Sucunduri River
  - Uatumã River
    - Jatapu River
      - Capucapu River
    - Pitinga River
  - Urubu River
  - Madeira River
    - Prêto do Igapó-Açu River
      - Autaz-mirim River
      - Tupana River
      - Matupiri River
        - Amapá River
      - Luna River
    - Aripuanã River
      - Arauá River
      - Juma River
      - Roosevelt River
        - Madeirinha River
      - Guaribe River
      - Maracanã River
    - Mariepauá River
    - Mataurá River
      - Uruá River
    - Manicoré River
      - Manicorezinho River
      - Jatuarana River
    - Dos Marmelos River
      - Maici River
      - Sepoti River
    - Ipixuna River
  - Preto da Eva River
  - Rio Negro
    - Tarumã Açu River
    - Tarumã Mirim River
    - Cuieiras River
    - Apuaú River
    - Puduari River
    - Curiuaú River
      - Camanaú River
    - Jaú River
      - Carabinani River
    - Unini River
      - Papagaio River
      - Pauini River
        - Guariba River
      - Arara River
      - Preto River
    - Jauaperi River
      - Alalaú River
    - Jufari River
    - Caurés River
    - Cuini River
    - Demini River
      - Araçá River
        - Curuduri River
        - Marari River
      - Toototobi River
      - Cuieiras River
    - Ararirá River
    - Padauari River
      - Preto River
    - Daraá River
    - Urubaxi River
    - Uneiuxi River
    - Tea River
    - Marauiá River
    - Cauaburi River
      - Maiá River
    - Marié River
      - Iá River
    - Curicuriari River
    - Uaupés River
      - Papuri River
    - Içana River
      - Cubate River
      - Cuiari River
      - Aiari River
    - Xie River
  - Manacapuru River
  - Purus River
    - Jari River
    - Ipixuna River
      - Itaparaná River
    - Jacaré River
    - Tapauá River
      - Cuniuá River
        - Pinhuã River
    - Mucum River
      - Açuã River
    - Umari River
    - Paciá River
    - Ituxi River
      - Jamicia River
      - Arauã River
      - Ciriquiri River
      - Curuquetê River
        - Coti River
      - Endimari River
    - Sepatini River
    - Tumiã River
    - Mamoriá River
    - Seruini River
    - Pauini River
      - Atucatiquini River
      - Muaco River
    - Inauini River
    - Acre River
      - Antimary River
      - Andirá River
    - Iaco River
  - Piorini River
    - Badajós River
  - Mamiá River
  - Coari River
    - Arauá River
    - Urucu River
    - Itanhauá River
  - Tefé River
  - Japurá River
    - Atiparaná River
    - Mapari River
    - Juami River
    - Puruê River
    - Traira River
  - Uarini River
  - Juruá River
    - Mineruázinho River
    - Xeruã River
    - Tarauacá River
      - Itucumã River
      - Envira River
        - Jurupari River
      - Acurauá River
    - Eiru River
    - Gregório River
    - Liberdade River
    - Ipixuna River
  - Jutai River
    - Copatana River
    - Riozinho River
    - Zinho River
    - Biá River
    - Pati River (Bóia River)
    - Mutum River
    - Jutaizinho River
  - Tonantins River
  - Içá River
    - Pureté River
  - Jandiatuba River
  - Javary River
    - Itaquai River
      - Quixito River
      - Ituí River
    - Curuçá River
      - Pardo River
      - Arrojo River
    - Jaquirana River

== By alphabetical order ==
- Abacaxis River
- Acari River
- Acre River
- Açuã River
- Acurauá River
- Aiari River
- Alalaú River
- Amanã River
- Amapá River
- Amazon River
- Andirá River
- Andirá River
- Antimary River
- Apoquitaua River
- Apuaú River
- Araçá River
- Arara River
- Ararirá River
- Arauá River
- Arauá River
- Arauã River
- Aripuanã River
- Arrojo River
- Atiparaná River
- Atucatiquini River
- Autaz-mirim River
- Badajós River
- Bararati River
- Biá River
- Camaiú River
- Camanaú River
- Canumã River
- Capucapu River
- Carabinani River
- Cauaburi River
- Caurés River
- Ciriquiri River
- Coari River
- Copatana River
- Coti River
- Cubate River
- Cuiari River
- Cuieiras River
- Cuieiras River
- Cuini River
- Cuniuá River
- Curicuriari River
- Curiuaú River
- Curuçá River
- Curuduri River
- Curuquetê River
- Daraá River
- Demini River
- Eiru River
- Endimari River
- Envira River
- Gregório River
- Guariba River
- Guaribe River
- Iá River
- Iaco River
- Içá River
- Içana River
- Inauini River
- Ipixuna River
- Ipixuna River
- Ipixuna River
- Itanhauá River
- Itaparaná River
- Itaquai River
- Itucumã River
- Ituí River
- Ituxi River
- Jacaré River
- Jamicia River
- Jandiatuba River
- Japurá River
- Jaquirana River
- Jari River
- Jatapu River
- Jatuarana River
- Jaú River
- Jauaperi River
- Javary River
- Juami River
- Jufari River
- Juma River
- Juruá River
- Juruena River
- Jurupari River
- Jutai River
- Jutaizinho River
- Liberdade River
- Luna River
- Madeira River
- Madeirinha River
- Maiá River
- Maici River
- Mamiá River
- Mamoriá River
- Mamuru River
- Manacapuru River
- Manicoré River
- Manicorezinho River
- Mapari River
- Mapiá Grande River
- Maracanã River
- Marari River
- Marauiá River
- Marié River
- Mariepauá River
- Marimari River
- Dos Marmelos River
- Mataurá River
- Matupiri River
- Maués Açu River
- Mineruázinho River
- Muaco River
- Mucum River
- Mutum River
- Rio Negro
- Nhamundá River
- Paciá River
- Padauari River
- Papagaio River
- Papuri River
- Paraconi River
- Paracori River
- Paraná Urariá
- Parauari River
- Pardo River
- Pati River (Bóia River)
- Pauini River
- Pauini River
- Pinhuã River
- Piorini River
- Piratucu River
- Pitinga River
- Preto River
- Preto River
- Preto da Eva River
- Prêto do Igapó-Açu River
- Puduari River
- Pureté River
- Puruê River
- Purus River
- Quixito River
- Riozinho River
- Roosevelt River
- Sepatini River
- Sepoti River
- Seruini River
- Sucunduri River
- Tapajós River
- Tapauá River
- Tarauacá River
- Tarumã Açu River
- Tarumã Mirim River
- Tea River
- Tefé River
- Tonantins River
- Toototobi River
- Traira River
- Tumiã River
- Tupana River
- Uaicurapa River
- Uarini River
- Uatumã River
- Uaupés River
- Umari River
- Uneiuxi River
- Unini River
- Uruá River
- Urubaxi River
- Urubu River
- Urucu River
- Urupadi River
- Xeruã River
- Xie River
- Zinho River
