= Ituí River =

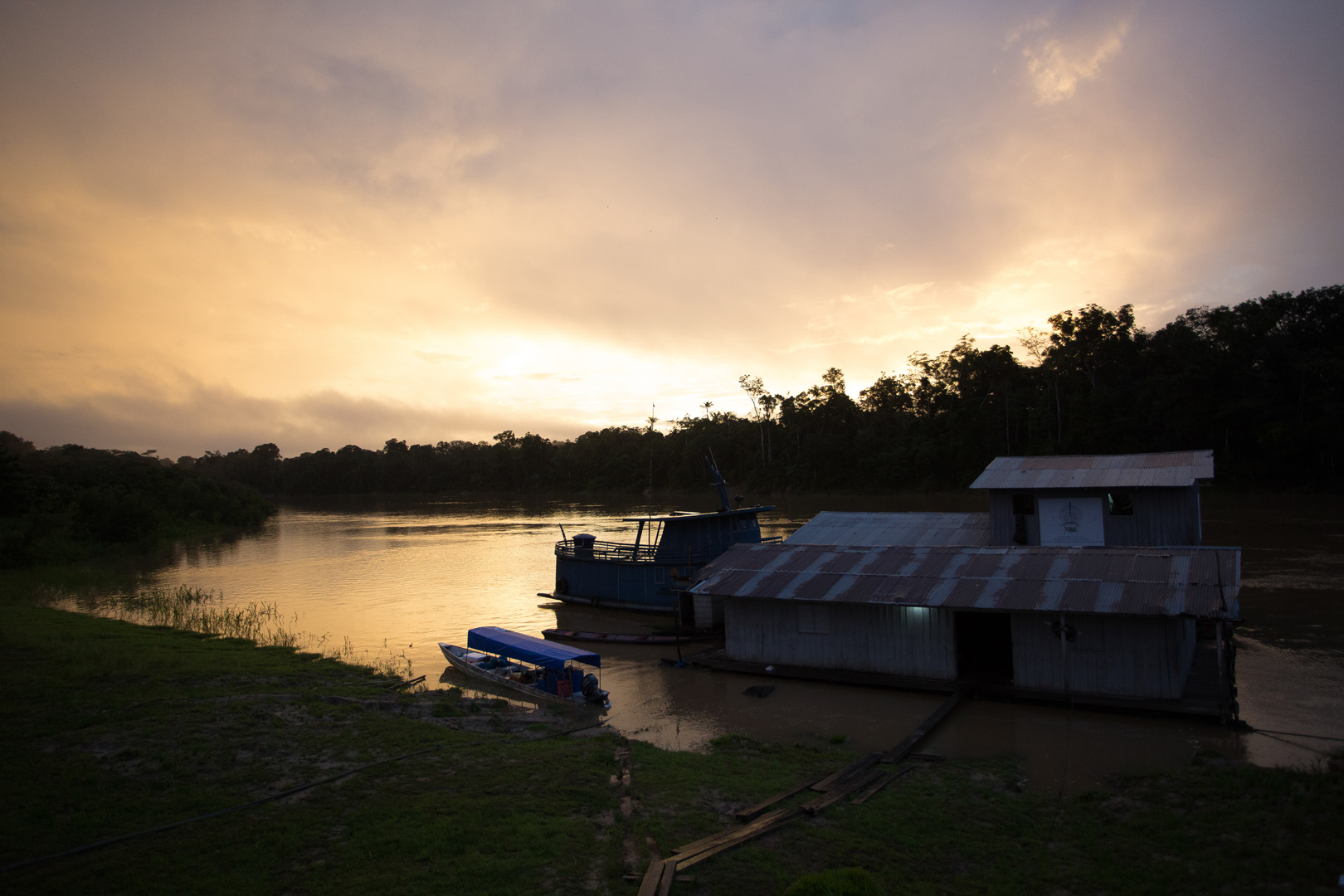

Location
- Country: Brazil
- State: Amazonas

Physical characteristics
- Source
  - location: Sierra del Divisor
  - coordinates: 7°5′4.8372″S 72°34′7.4028″W
  - elevation: 198 m (650 ft)
- Mouth: Javary River
  - location: Atalaia do Norte, Amazonas
  - coordinates: 4°22′19″S 70°11′31″W
  - elevation: 62 m (203 ft)
- Length: 480 km (300 mi) to 558 km (347 mi)
- Basin size: 43,035 km^{2} (16,616 sq mi) to 43,403.1 km^{2} (16,758.0 mi^{2})
- Discharge
  - location: Atalaia do Norte (near mouth)
  - average: (Period: 1970–2000)2,322.6 m^{3}/s (82,020 cu ft/s) (Period: 1979–2015)2,422.1 m^{3}/s (85,540 cu ft/s)

Basin features
- Tributaries
  - left: Rio Negro, Branquinho, Quixito
  - right: Novo, Itaquai

The Ituí River is a river of the upper Amazon Basin. It traverses some 370 km of the Atalaia do Norte municipality in the Amazonas state of north-western Brazil. The Ituí is a left tributary of the Javary River. It drains a very low gradient, dropping hardly 100 m over its whole extent, which results in extensive meandering. The Rio Negro, Beija-flor and Branquinho are some of its western tributaries, while the Rio Novo is its main eastern tributary. Downstream it joins the Itaquai River to form the upper Solimões.

== See also ==
- Korubo
- List of rivers of Amazonas
- Vale do Javari
