= Puduari River =

River in Brazil

- Location within Brazil
- Native name: Rio Puduari (Portuguese)

Location
- Country: Brazil

Physical characteristics
- Mouth
  - location: Rio Negro
  - coordinates: 2.10475°S 61.22015°W

Basin features
- River system: Rio Negro

The Puduari River (Portuguese: Rio Puduari) is a river in the state of Amazonas, Brazil. It is a tributary of the Rio Negro.

== Course ==
The river runs in a northeast direction to join the right bank of the Rio Negro to the north of the town of Novo Airão. It forms the boundary between the Rio Negro State Park North Section on its left (north west) bank and the Rio Negro Right Bank Environmental Protection Area along its right (south east) bank. The terra firma forest in the river basin has abundant Manicaria saccifera palms.

== Fauna ==
The river is a blackwater river, as are the nearby Rio Negro tributaries the Unini, Jaú and Carabinani rivers, and has similar fauna and flora to those rivers. Forty species of fish have been recorded in the river and thirty species in the streams that feed it from the state park. The most common species in the river are Auchenipterichthys longimanus, Ageneiosus species, Bryconops species, Cyphocharax abramoides, Serrasalmus gouldingi and Hemiodus goeldi, while the most common species in the streams are Bryconops species, Hemigrammus pretoensis, Pyrrhulina brevis, Copella nigrofasciata, Microcharacidium eleotrioides and Poeciloharax weitzmani.

== See also ==
- List of rivers of Amazonas

== Sources ==
- PES do Rio Negro Setor Norte (in Portuguese), ISA: Instituto Socioambiental
- Sérgio Henrique Borges; Yara da Rocha Camargo; Clarice Bassi; Marcelo Paustein Moreira; Simone Iwanaga; Marcelo Garcia (August 2008), Plano de Gestão do Parque Estadual Rio Negro Setor Norte (PDF) (in Portuguese), vol. I - Diagnóstico da Unidade de Conservação, Manaus, archived from the original (PDF) on 2023-03-24
