= Arauá River =

Arauá River may refer to the following rivers in Brazil:

== Brazil ==
- Arauá River (Aripuanã River tributary), Amazonas
- Arauá River (Coari River tributary), Amazonas
- Arauá River (Sergipe)
- Arauã River, Amazonas
