= Ipixuna River =

Ipixuna River may refer to:

- Ipixuna River (Juruá River)
- Ipixuna River (Madeira River)
- Ipixuna River (Purus River)

== See also ==
- Ipixuna
