= Pauini River =

Pauini River may refer to:

- Pauini River (Purus River), a river of Brazil
- Pauini River (Unini River), a river of Brazil
