= Vale do Javari =

Indigenous territory in Amazonas, Brazil

Terra Indígena do Vale do Javari
- Indigenous Territory
- Nickname: Vale do Javari
- Location in Brazil = Vale do Javari
- Coordinates: 5°21′32″S 70°59′10″W
- Country: Brazil
- State: Amazonas

Area
  - Total: 32,990.43 sq mi (85,444.82 km^{2})

Vale do Javari (English: Javari Valley) is one of the largest indigenous territories in Brazil, encompassing 85,444.82 km^{2} (32,990 mi^{2}) – an area larger than Austria. It is named after the Javari River, the most important river of the region, which since 1851 has formed the border with Peru. It includes much of the Atalaia do Norte municipality as well as adjacent territories in the western section of Amazonas state. Besides the Javari it is transected by the Pardo, Quixito, Itaquai and Ituí rivers.

== Inhabitants ==
Vale do Javari is home to 3,000 indigenous peoples of Brazil with varying degrees of contact, including the Matis, the Matses, the Kulina, and others. The uncontacted indigenous peoples are estimated to be more than 2,000 individuals belonging to at least 14 tribes including the Isolados do Rio Quixito, Isolados do Itaquai (Korubo), Isolados do Jandiatuba, Isolados do Alto Jutai, Isolados do Sao Jose, Isolados do Rio Branco, Isolados do Medio Javari and Isolados do Jaquirana-Amburus. These are believed to be living deep inside its reservation areas. The uncontacted tribes live in some 19 known villages identified by air. According to Fabricio Amorim from the Brazilian National Indigenous People Foundation (FUNAI), the region contains "the greatest concentration of isolated groups in the Amazon and the world".

The Brazilian government has made it illegal for non-indigenous people to enter the territory; the area (along with its inhabitants) is observed by the government from the air with rare overland treks by FUNAI officials and local guides. Non-indigenous people living in the area at the time were forcibly removed, sometimes without fair compensation.

== Illegal economic activities ==
The region is known for being a trafficking route for cocaine. Illegal activities, such as fishing (mostly to export pirarucu and piracatinga), logging and mining, help criminal groups linked to drug trafficking to launder money and import more drugs to Brazil.

"Contacted" native tribes additionally have been reported to make illegal contact with "uncontacted" tribes to exploit their superior hunting skills.

=== Rubber boom ===
During the Amazon rubber boom, natives along the Javari River were subjected to slave raids, which were aimed at acquiring a workforce to extract rubber.

"During the time of the great rubber boom the Indians were often relentlessly hunted, either as labor material or as irreconcilable opponents of the invaders of their tribal lands. This occurred on a large scale in the valley of the Javery, in the Acre country, and in the Itenez basin in Bolivia...."

== In the media ==
In October 2009, a plane with eleven people aboard emergency-landed in the middle of the reservation. People from the Matis tribe found the wreckage and alerted local authorities, who dispatched a rescue mission that flew nine survivors out of the reservation.

In June 2022, British freelance journalist Dom Phillips and Bruno Pereira, a Brazilian expert on indigenous peoples of Amazonas, were murdered by poachers for helping to protect indigenous people from illegal drug traffickers, miners, loggers, and hunters.
