= Cujubim Sustainable Development Reserve =

- Reserva de Desenvolvimento Sustentável Cujubim
- IUCN category VI (protected area with sustainable use of natural resources)
- Location within Brazil
- Nearest city: Jutaí, Amazonas
- Coordinates: 5.535°S 69.109°W
- Area: 24,503.80 km^{2} (9,460.97 mi^{2})
- Designation: Sustainable development reserve
- Created: 5 September 2003

The Cujubim Sustainable Development Reserve (Portuguese: Reserva de Desenvolvimento Sustentável Cujubim) is a sustainable development reserve in the state of Amazonas, Brazil.

== Location ==
The Cujubim Sustainable Development Reserve (RDS) takes its name from the Blue-throated piping guan (Aburria cumanensis), locally called the Cujubim and a common bird in the region. The reserve is in the municipality of Jutaí, Amazonas and has an area of 24,503.80 km^{2} (9,460.97 mi^{2}). It is the largest conservation unit in Amazonas and the largest sustainable development reserve in the world. It lies along the Jutaí River, a tributary of the Solimões River that flows in a northeast direction to the west of the Juruá River. The conservation unit also contains the Biá and Mutum rivers, tributaries of the Jutaí.

The reserve may be reached by boat from Manaus, the capital of Amazonas, 918 kilometres (570 mi) distant. The trip would typically take about eight days. A flight to Fonte Boa Airport, the nearest commercial airport, cuts the boat journey to three and a half days.

The Cujubim Sustainable Development Reserve is part of the Central Amazon Biodiversity Corridor, along with other conservation units on either side of the Solimões. It is upstream from the Rio Jutaí Extractive Reserve. The Vale do Javari Indigenous Territory adjoins the reserve to the west and the Rio Biá Indigenous Territory adjoins it to the east. The Rio Biá Indigenous Territory in turn adjoins the Uacari Sustainable Development Reserve and the Médio Juruá Extractive Reserve on the Juruá.

== History ==
The Cujubim Sustainable Development Reserve was created by decree 23.724 of 5 September 2003. It became part of the Central Amazon Ecological Corridor, established in 2002. The deliberative council was created on 3 April 2008. The management plan was approved on 13 March 2009. The conservation unit is supported by the Amazon Region Protected Areas Program.

== Environment ==
The weather is hot and humid. Average annual rainfall is 2,460 millimetres (97 in). Average temperatures range from 22 to 32 °C (72 to 90 °F). The land is flat, with maximum elevation of 70 metres (230 ft). Vegetation is mainly open alluvial forest with palms, but there is great diversity. The land along the rivers includes seasonally flooded várzea or igapó forests. Higher up the forest is terra firma, and is more dense or open depending on variations in relief. In some areas there is succession forest regenerating after human activities such as mining and oil prospecting.

The reserve is in the Inambari area of endemism, one of the most diverse of the Amazon forest. More than 700 species of plant have been recorded. Further studies are needed, but the reserve is estimated to harbour at least 600 species of birds, 90 bats and 16 primates. The reserve hosts populations of threatened or endangered species such as the giant otter (Pteronura brasiliensis), South American tapir (Tapirus terrestris), jaguar (Panthera onca), cougar (Puma concolor) and Amazonian manatee (Trichechus inunguis). The first record in Brazil of the eastern lowland olingo (Bassaricyon alleni) was made in the reserve. Other species include white-lipped peccary (Tayassu pecari), big-headed Amazon River turtle (Peltocephalus dumerilianus), six-tubercled Amazon River turtle (Podocnemis sextuberculata) and pirarucu (Arapaima gigas).

== Economy ==
The reserve is in a very isolated area, with high levels of poverty and low human development indices. Most of the residents are descended from the "rubber soldiers" who moved to Amazonia from the north east of Brazil during World War II (1939–45) to work as rubber tappers. Due to lack of health and education infrastructure many families left the region for the cities in the 1980s, but many could not adapt to city life and later returned. A survey before the reserve was created showed that about 56% of residents were illiterate, while the remainder had no more than 4th grade elementary education. 39% of residents were children under ten years old and less than 1% were over 70 years old. In April 2008 there were 36 households registered in the Bolsa Floresta program of the Amazonas Sustainable Foundation.

In 2015 there were almost 290 people from 56 families in the reserve. They engage in extraction, fishing, hunting and farming. The main sources of income are marketing salmorado fish, particularly surubi, logging and capture of turtles. Extracted products include oils, straw, vines, fruits, honey and rubber. The most common timber species are Ceiba pentandra, Copaiba, Virola, Calophyllum brasiliense, Ocotea cymbarum, Carapa, Virola sebifera and Cedrela odorata.

The residents have traditionally depended on "regatões" (middlemen) who purchase their products and bring supplies from the city, often at unfair prices. Credit is being supplied so the residents can break free of debt to the "regatões" and market their products directly. As an alternative to logging the agencies involved in managing the reserve are encouraging extraction of resins, copaiba and andiroba oils and rubber. Fruit, vegetables and medicinal plants are also potential sources of income.

== Sources ==
- CEC Central da Amazônia (in Portuguese), ISA: Instituto Socioambiental
- Full list: PAs supported by ARPA, ARPA
- RDS Cujubim (in Portuguese), ISA: Instituto Socioambiental
- Taketa, Brenda; MacDowell, Megan; Carvalho, Raquel (2015), Reserva de Desenvolvimento Sustentável Cujubim (PDF), CI-Brasil
