= Preto River (Padauari River tributary) =

Location
- Country: Brazil

Physical characteristics
- Source
  - location: Amazonas state
- Mouth: Padauari River
  - coordinates: 0°8′S 64°6′W

Preto River is a river of Amazonas state in north-western Brazil. It is a tributary of the Padauari River.

== See also ==
- List of rivers of Amazonas
