= Camanaú River =

- Location within Brazil
- Native name: Rio Camanaú (Portuguese)

Location
- Country: Brazil

Physical characteristics
- Source
  - location: Amazonas
- Mouth
  - location: Curiuaú River
  - coordinates: 1.821478°S 61.229063°W

Basin features
- River system: Curiuaú River

Camanaú River is a river of Amazonas state in north-western Brazil, a tributary of the Curiuaú River.

Most of the river basin is in the 2,585,910 hectares (6,389,900 acres) Waimiri Atroari Indigenous Territory.

== See also ==
- List of rivers of Amazonas

== Sources ==
- Contemporary Waimiri Atroari society, ISA: Instituto Socioambiental
