= Guariba River =

There are several rivers named Guariba River in Brazil:

- Guariba River (Aripuanã River tributary), in Amazonas & Mato Grosso
- Guariba River (Pauini River tributary), in Amazonas
