= Dos Marmelos River =

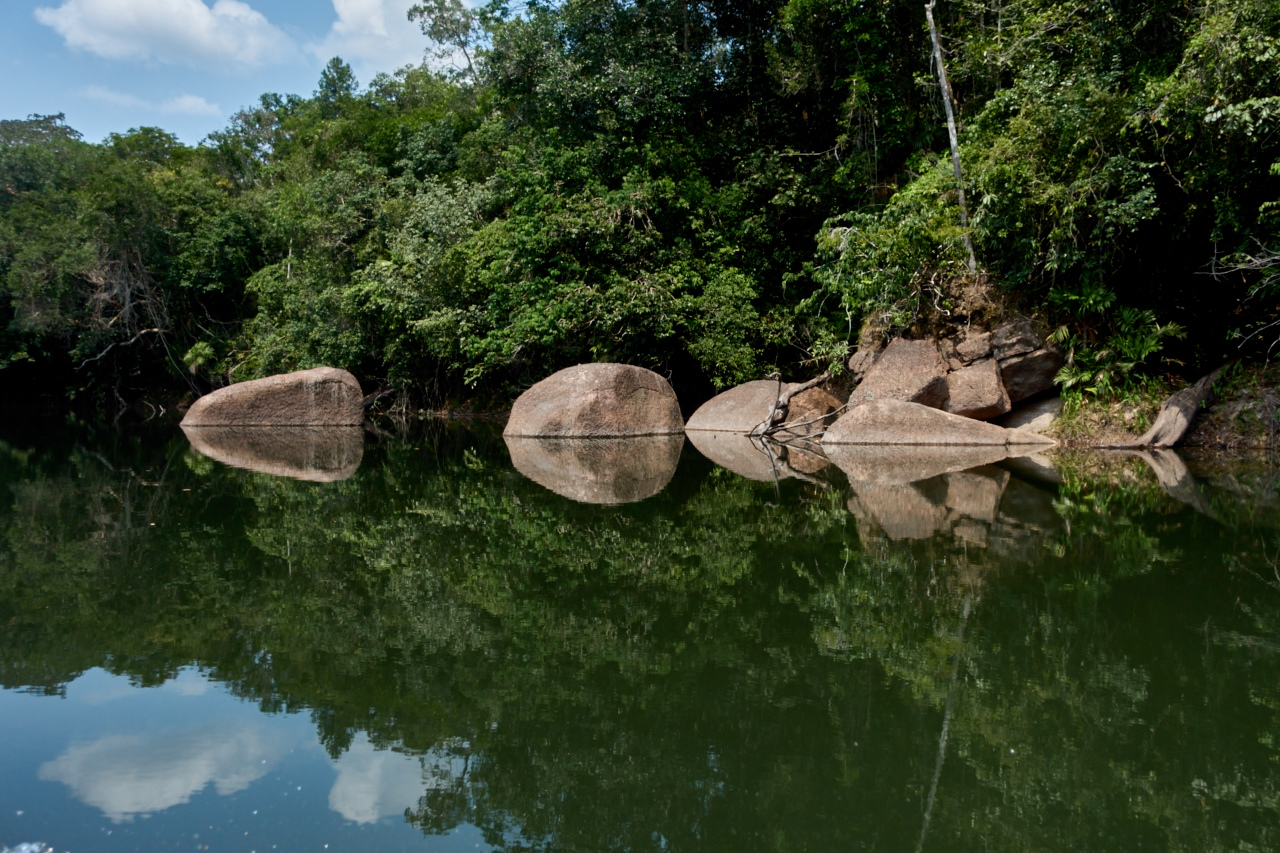

- Location within Brazil
- Native name: Rio dos Marmelos (Portuguese)

Location
- Country: Brazil

Physical characteristics
- Source
  - location: Campos Amazônicos National Park, Amazonas
  - coordinates: 8°39′4.806″S 61°58′22.0944″W
  - elevation: 120 m (390 ft)
- Mouth
  - location: Madeira
  - coordinates: 6.147621°S 61.786841°W
  - elevation: 30 m (98 ft)
- Length: 510 km (320 mi)
- Basin size: 27,572.2 km^{2} (10,645.7 mi^{2})
- Discharge
  - location: Confluence of Madeira, Amazonas
  - average: (Period: 1971–2000)1,556.5 m^{3}/s (54,970 cu ft/s)

Basin features
- Progression: Madeira → Amazon → Atlantic Ocean
- River system: Amazon
- Tributaries
  - left: Preto, Maici
  - right: Branco, Sepoti

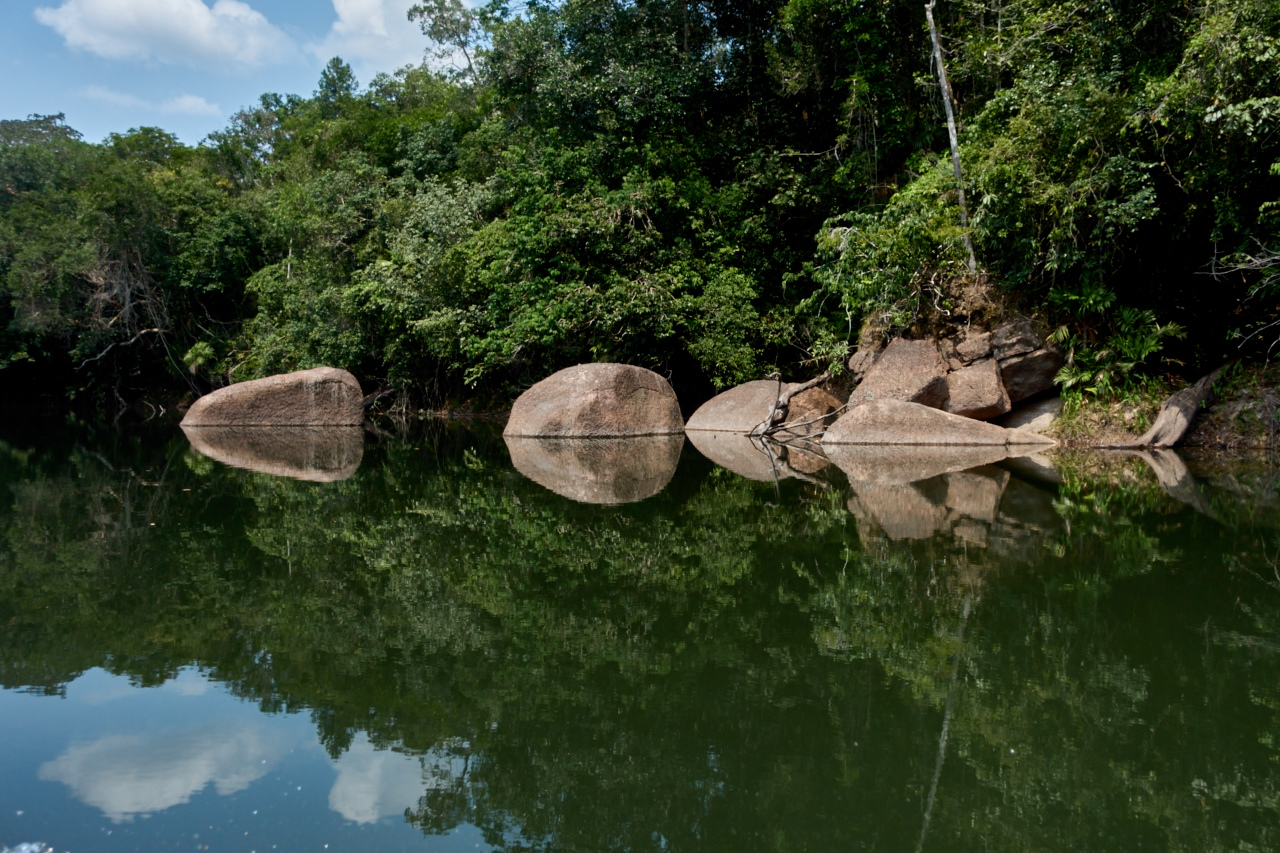
Stone formation on Dos Marmelos

Dos Marmelos River (Portuguese: Rio dos Marmelos) is a river of Amazonas state in north-western Brazil. It is a tributary of the Madeira River, and merges into this river about 80 km (50 mi) upstream from the town of Manicoré.

The headwaters of the river are in the Campos Amazônicos National Park, a 961,318 hectares (2,375,470 acres) protected area created in 2006 that holds an unusual enclave of cerrado vegetation in the Amazon rainforest.

== See also ==
- List of rivers of Amazonas
