= Badajós River =

Location
- Country: Brazil

Physical characteristics
- Source
  - location: Amazonas state
  - coordinates: 3°12′2.5092″S 63°47′33.1836″W
  - elevation: 59 m (194 ft)
- Mouth
  - coordinates: 3°44′47.022″S 62°16′37.3116″W
  - elevation: 16 m (52 ft)
- Length: 413 km (257 mi)
- Basin size: 21,740 km^{2} (8,390 sq mi)
- Discharge
  - location: Confluencia of Solimões, Amazonas
  - average: 1,700 m^{3}/s (60,000 cu ft/s)

Basin features
- Tributaries
  - left: Cunauaru
  - right: Piorini

Badajós River is a river of Amazonas state in north-western Brazil.

== See also ==
- List of rivers of Amazonas
