= Pitinga mine =

Open pit tin mine in Brazil

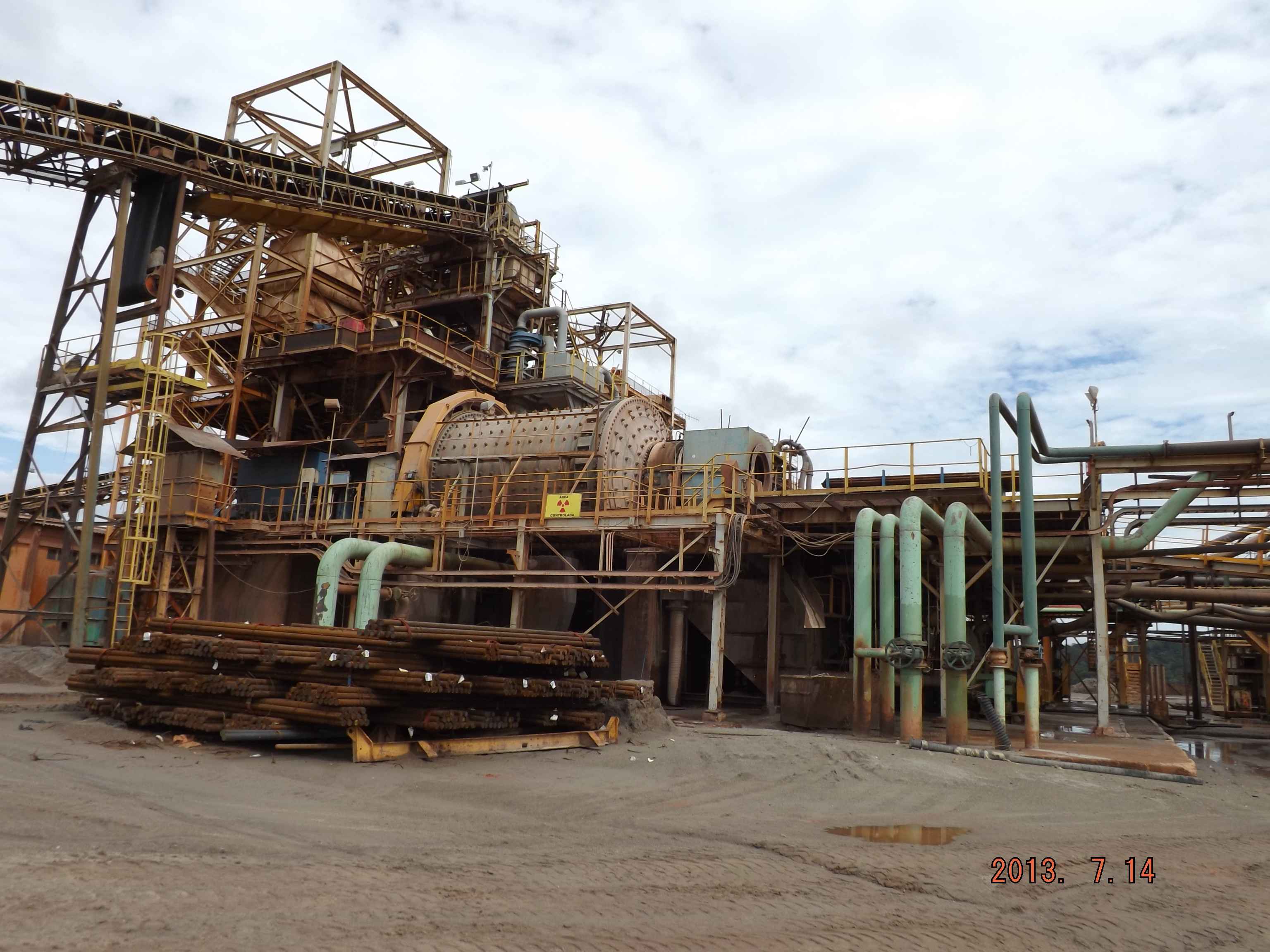
- The Pitinga mine, circa 2013

- Location within Brazil
- Location: Presidente Figueiredo, Amazonas, Brazil; 0°45′12.5″S 60°06′05″W
- Products: Tin
- Company: Minsur

The Pitinga mine is an open pit tin mine in Brazil. It is thought to have the largest undeveloped tin deposit in the world. A complete community of 5,000 people was established in the remote location in the Amazon rainforest to support the mining operations, which began in 1982. There have been accidents, but efforts have been made to minimise environmental damage and to restore areas that were mined. As of 2014 the more accessible alluvial deposits were exhausted, but mining of primary rock was continuing.

== Discovery ==
In 1976 the Brazilian Geological Survey detected deposits of cassiterite (tin ore) to the east of the Waimiri Atroari Indigenous Reservation. Geologists of the Brazilian Geological Survey found traces of cassiterite in 1976 in tributaries of the Pitinga River that is outside the Indian reserve. The ore was reported to assay 2.1 kg/m^{3}, much higher than typical deposits in Rondônia to the southwest. Paranapanema, assisted by FUNAI and the National Department of Mineral Production, managed to have the reservation downgraded in 1981 to the Temporary Restricted Area for the Attraction and Pacification of the Waimiri Atroari Indians, with a reduced area that excluded the cassiterite deposits. Presidential decree 86.630 of 23 November 1981 removed 526,800 hectares (1,302,000 acres) from the reserve for the tin mining operations.

In 1982 the US Bureau of Mines estimated Brazil had total reserves of 67,000 tonnes of contained tin. In 1986 the Pitinga reserves alone were estimated at 575,000 tonnes of contained tin. The Mineração Taboca concession covers 130,000 hectares (320,000 acres) in 14 lots, but as of 1992 only 7,200 hectares (18,000 acres) were being actively exploited. Primary deposits are found in the hills of the Serra da Madeira and alluvium deposits have been washed down into the forested valleys. The alluvial deposits, now exhausted, consisted of greisens associated with the Água Boa biotite granite and the Madeira niobium-tantalum-tin deposit. The coarse-grained porphyritic albite granite has intruding paleoproterozoic acid volcanic and pyroclastic rocks. It includes Rapakivi granite and Biotite granite.

== Operations ==
The Pitinga mine began operations in 1982. Mineração Taboca built a community in the Amazon forest 300 kilometres (190 mi) from Manaus. The complex includes roads, treated water, sanitation and a housing estate with 5,000 people. It has schools, restaurants, health facilities, a bank branch, post office, telephone exchange and supermarket. In 1985 Paranapanema invested US$15 million in infrastructure upgrades, including a 10,000 kilowatt hydroelectric power plant on the Pitinga River, expected to reduce energy costs by US$4 million annually. By 1990 the mine directly employed 2,000 people, and indirectly perhaps as many as 40,000.

Trees were cleared, the river diverted and dams and ponds built before the alluvium deposits were processed. Bucketwheel excavator dredges extracted material rich in cassiterite, which was pumped through pipes to floating processing plants that separated the tin ore. The cassiterite is concentrated on site, then shipped to Mamoré Mineração e Metalurgia in the southern state of São Paulo for casting. Columbite ore is also mined, concentrated and processed on site for use in production of FeNbTa metallic alloy. Up to 1990 a total of 120,000 tonnes of metallic tin were produced. Mamoré Mineração e Metalurgia produced 18,000 tonnes of metallic tin in 1991. About US$200 million had been invested in the Pitinga complex by then, and the mine had earned US$915 million in foreign currency. The mine was thought to be the world's most productive.

In 2006 Mineração Taboca began to extract ore from primary rock in place of the alluvial deposits. Mineração Taboca and Mamoré Mineração e Metalurgia were acquired by the Peruvian company Minsur in 2008. In 2014 Minsur had plans to develop the lower deposits, thought to be the largest undeveloped tin mine in the world with deposits estimated at 420,000t. In 2014 the Pitinga mine produced 5,532 tonnes of tin-in-concentrate, and 3,256 tonnes in the first half of 2015. Net costs per tonne of tin in 2015 were US$14,481, allowing for revenues from co-production of tantalum and niobium. At the start of August 2015 water filtrations were found in the dyke of the hydroelectric plant 80 kilometres (50 mi) away that supplies power to the plant, and operations had to slow down while repairs were made.

== Environmental impact ==
Mineração Taboca made efforts to minimise environmental damage and to assist recovery of the mined areas. This includes building dams and dykes to hold tailings and to clarify water, replanting areas cleared for mining or road construction, creating drainage systems and so on. Tailings are held in holding ponds as a reserve that may be further processed if justified by a rise in the price of tin. In 1987 the dykes of four ponds broke. The sediment was released into the Alalaú River, and the pollution affected the fish downstream in the Waimiri-Atroari Indian Reserve. The Indians reported the polluted water had made them ill. The company has researched ways of restoring the degraded areas, and has worked with environmental agencies on plans for recovery. The plans include work by universities, research institutes and specialised companies. As of March 1991 the cost of environmental recovery was estimated at US$50 million.

== Pitinga village ==
Pitinga or Vila Pitinga is a village in the municipality of Presidente Figueiredo, in the state of Amazonas. It was created from the opening of the Pitinga mine, an open mineral exploration area on the site, where various minerals are extracted, but the main ones are tin and the metallic alloy of iron, niobium and tantalum. Belonging to the mining company Taboca (Peruvian group Minsur).

The village is located 320 kilometers from Manaus, in the direction of Boa Vista (RR, BR-174). It has approximately 2,500 residents and has very low rates of crime and infant mortality.

== Sources ==
- Baines, Stephen G. (2008-10-27). "The Reconstruction of Waimiri-Atroari Territory". In Adolfo de Oliveira (ed.). Decolonising Indigenous Rights. Routledge. ISBN 978-1-134-30076-1.
- "Ellicott® Dredges working on Pitinga Tin Mine in Brazil for Taboca". World Dredging Mining & Construction. 30 July 2008.
- Emery, Alex (3 April 2014). "Minsur seeking to develop Brazil's Pitinga tin mine, boost Peru reserves". Business News Americas.
- Hall, A.; Goodman, D. (1990-11-09). The Future of Amazonia: Destruction or Sustainable Development?. Palgrave Macmillan UK. ISBN 978-1-349-21068-8.
- "Minsur cuts production at Pitinga mine". ITRI. 19 August 2015. Archived from the original on August 20, 2016.
- "Pitinga Mine, Presidente Figueiredo, Amazonas, Brazil", Mindat
- Smale-Adams, K. B. (1986). Mining Latin America / Minería Latinoamericana. Springer Science & Business Media. ISBN 978-94-017-2286-5.
- "The Company - History". Mineração Taboca. Archived from the original on 2016-08-17.
- Treece, Dave (1987). Bound in Misery and Iron: The Impact of the Grande Carajás Programme on the Indians of Brazil. Survival International. ISBN 978-0-946592-01-2. UOM:39015018820574.
- "Waimiri Atroari: Contact Situation". ISA: Instituto Socioambiental.
- Warhurst, Alyson (1999). Mining and the Environment: Case Studies from the Americas. IDRC. ISBN 978-0-88936-828-6.
