= Marimari River =

Coordinates: 3°58′20″S 58°49′30″W

Location
- Country: Brazil

Physical characteristics
- Source
  - location: Amazonas state
- Mouth
  - location: Abacaxis River

Marimari River is a tributary of the Abacaxis River in Amazonas state in north-western Brazil. It merges into the Abacaxis River shortly before the latter merges into the Paraná Urariá.

== See also ==
- List of rivers of Amazonas
