= Arara River (Unini River tributary) =

River in Amazonas, Brazil

Location
- Country: Brazil

Physical characteristics
- Source
  - location: Amazonas state
- Mouth: Unini River
  - coordinates: 1°39′01″S 63°32′09″W

Arara River is a river of Amazonas state in north-western Brazil. It is a tributary of the Unini River, which stems from Negro River. This is not to be confused with Arara River in the Acre state of western Brazil.

== See also ==
- List of rivers of Amazonas
