= Coari River =

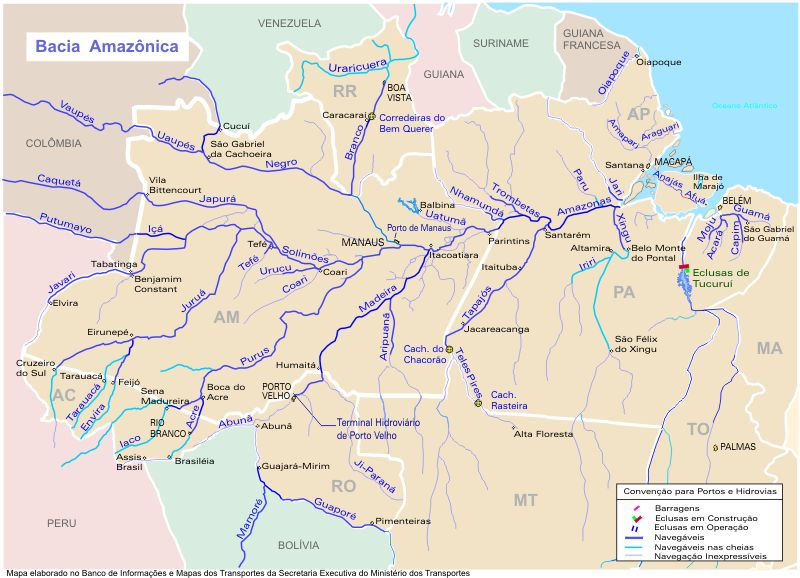
- Coari River center-left (west of Manaus)

Location
- Country: Brazil
- State: Amazonas

Physical characteristics
- Source
  - location: Amazonas
  - coordinates: 5°24′24.3216″S 65°45′23.7852″W
  - elevation: 96 m (315 ft)
- Mouth: Solimões
  - location: Coari, Amazonas
  - coordinates: 4°4′34.7808″S 63°8′9.6864″W
  - elevation: 21 m (69 ft)
- Length: 530 km (330 mi)
- Basin size: 37,500 km^{2} (14,500 sq mi)
- Discharge
  - location: Coari (near mouth)
  - average: 1,850 m^{3}/s (65,000 cu ft/s)

Basin features
- River system: Solimões
- Tributaries
  - left: Itanhauã, Muã, Urucu, Aruã

Coari River is a tributary of the Amazon River (Solimões section) in the Amazonas state in north-western Brazil.

== See also ==
- List of rivers of Amazonas
