= Riozinho River (Amazonas) =

- Location within Brazil
- Native name: Rio Riozinho (Portuguese)

Location
- Country: Brazil

Physical characteristics
- Source
  - location: Amazonas state
- Mouth
  - coordinates: 2°54′S 66°57′W

Basin features
- River system: Jutaí River

The Riozinho River (Portuguese: Rio Riozinho) is a river of Amazonas state in north-western Brazil. It is a tributary of the Jutaí River.

The Riozinho River forms the eastern boundary of the 275,533 hectares (680,860 acres) Rio Jutaí Extractive Reserve, flowing north to join the Jutaí River.

== See also ==
- List of rivers of Amazonas

== Sources ==
- RESEX do Rio Jutaí (in Portuguese), ISA: Instituto Socioambiental
