= Jamicia River =

Location
- Country: Brazil

Physical characteristics
- Source
  - location: Amazonas state
- Mouth
  - coordinates: 7°27′S 64°54′W

Jamicia River is a river of Amazonas state in north-western Brazil.

== See also ==
- List of rivers of Amazonas
