= Uruá River =

Location
- Country: Brazil

Physical characteristics
- Source
  - location: Amazonas state
- Mouth
  - coordinates: 5°40′S 60°49′W

Uruá River is a river of Amazonas state in north-western Brazil. The river is located between the Negro River and the Amazon River. The river has been tested for populations of giant otter.

== See also ==
- List of rivers of Amazonas

== Bibliography ==
- Brazilian Ministry of Transport
