= Copatana River =

Location
- Country: Brazil

Physical characteristics
- Source
  - location: Amazonas state
- Mouth
  - location: Jutaí River
  - coordinates: 2°51′S 66°56′W

Copatana River is a river of Amazonas state in north-western Brazil. It is a tributary of the Jutaí River, and flows into this river about 20 km (12 mi) before the Jutai merges into the Amazon River.

== See also ==
- List of rivers of Amazonas
