= Quixito River =

Coordinates: 04°31′52″S 70°34′36″W

Location
- Country: Brazil

Physical characteristics
- Source
  - location: Amazonas state

Quixito River is a river of Amazonas state in north-western Brazil. It is a tributary of the Solimões near the village of Atalaia do Norte.

== See also ==
- List of rivers of Amazonas
- Vale do Javari
