= Tonantins River =

River of the Amazonas state in north-western Brazil

Coordinates: 2°52′08″S 67°46′37″W

Location
- Country: Brazil

Physical characteristics
- Source
  - location: Amazonas

The Tonantins River is a river of the Amazonas state in north-western Brazil.

== See also ==
- List of rivers of Amazonas (Brazilian state)
