= Mineruázinho River =

Coordinates: 3°03′S 66°04′W

Location
- Country: Brazil

Physical characteristics
- Source
  - location: Amazonas state

Mineruázinho River is a river of Amazonas state in north-western Brazil.

== See also ==
- List of rivers of Amazonas
