= Sepatini River =

Coordinates: 7°32′S 65°17′W

- Location within Brazil

Location
- Country: Brazil

Physical characteristics
- Mouth: Purus River
- Length: 310 km (190 mi)

Sepatini River is a river of Amazonas state in north-western Brazil.

== See also ==
- List of rivers of Amazonas
