= Pati River =

Coordinates: 3°12′50″S 67°23′51″W

Location
- Country: Brazil

Physical characteristics
- Source
  - location: Amazonas state
- Mouth
  - location: Jutaí River

Pati River is a river of Amazonas state in north-western Brazil. It is a tributary of the Jutaí River

== See also ==
- List of rivers of Amazonas
