= Arauá River (Coari River tributary) =

Location
- Country: Brazil

Physical characteristics
- Source
  - location: Amazonas state
- Mouth: Coari River
  - coordinates: 4°6′S 63°37′W

Arauá River is a river of Amazonas state in northwestern Brazil. It is a tributary of the Coari River.

== See also ==
- List of rivers of Amazonas
