= Luna River (Brazil) =

Location
- Country: Brazil

Physical characteristics
- Source
  - location: Amazonas state
- Mouth
  - coordinates: 4°32′S 60°45′W

Luna River is a river of the Amazonas state in north-western Brazil.

== See also ==
- List of rivers of Amazonas
