= Maici River =

- Maici River (Brazil)

Location
- Country: Brazil

Physical characteristics
- Source
  - location: Amazonas state
  - coordinates: 6.514166°S 61.729860°W

Basin features
- River system: Marmelos

Maici River is a river of Amazonas state in north-western Brazil.

The Maici River is a left tributary of the dos Marmelos River. It flows through the Humaitá National Forest, a 473,155 hectares (1,169,190 acres) sustainable use conservation unit created in 1998.

== See also ==
- List of rivers of Amazonas
