= Waimiri Atroari Indigenous Territory =

Indigenous territory in Amazonas and Roraima, Brazil

- Terra Indígena Waimiri Atroari
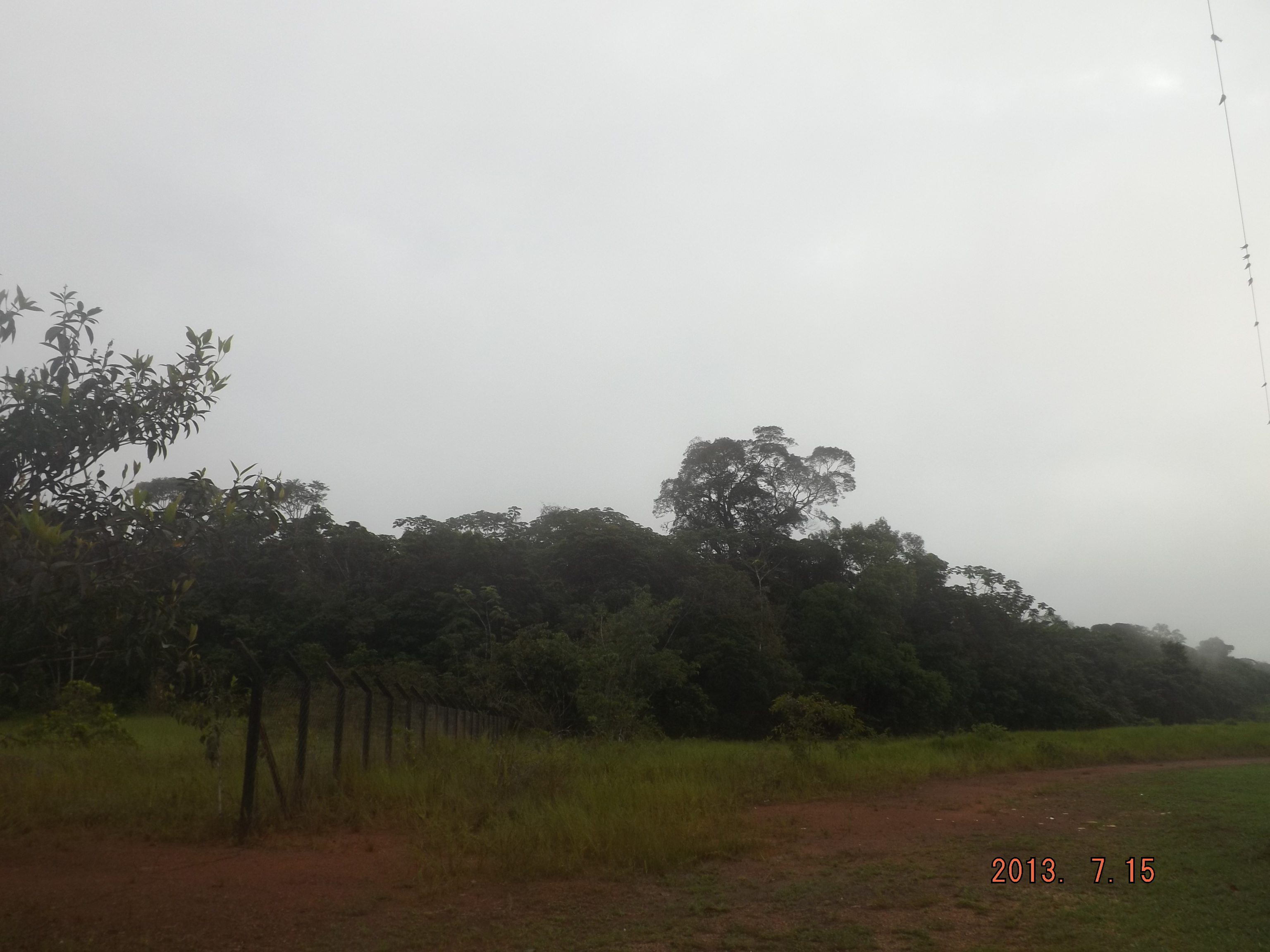
- Entry to the Indigenous Territory

- Location within Roraima Location within Brazil
- Nearest city: Presidente Figueiredo, Amazonas
- Coordinates: 0.860553°S 60.522396°W
- Area: 2,585,910 hectares (6,389,900 acres)
- Designation: Indigenous territory
- Created: 1989
- Administrator: Funai

The Waimiri Atroari Indigenous Territory (Portuguese: Terra Indígena Waimiri Atroari) is an Indigenous territory in the states of Amazonas and Roraima, Brazil. There has been a long history of violent conflict between the Indigenous Waimiri-Atroari people and newcomers from other parts of Brazil. Since the 1960s there have been many efforts to "civilise" the Waimiri-Atroari to avoid problems with the BR-174 highway, which cuts across the territory, and with tin mines and the huge Balbina Dam. The territory is now considerably smaller, but there have been improvements in living standards.

== Location ==
The territory has an area of 2,585,910 hectares (6,389,900 acres), divided between the states of Amazonas and Roraima. It lies to the northwest of the massive reservoir of the Balbina Dam and to the east of the Rio Negro. The reserve contains the basins of the Jauaperi and Camanaú rivers and their tributaries, the Alalaú, Curiaú, Pardo and Santo Antonio do Abonari rivers. The BR-174 federal highway from Manaus to Boa Vista runs through the reserve from south to north.

== Background ==
The first recorded European contact with the Waimiri-Atroari was when the botanist João Barbosa Rodrigues travelled through various villages in the region in 1884. He was followed by woodsmen looking for animal pelts, Brazil nuts, rosewood, rubber and other natural resources. The intruders were attacked by Indians armed with bows and arrows. In response, the government mounted military expeditions in which many Indians were killed. A rough estimate of the population at the start of the 20th century is 2000–6000. Alípio Bandeira of the Indian Protection Service (SPI) travelled in the Jauaperi River region in 1911 and established the first Indian attraction station on the river in 1912, where he made the first friendly contacts with people then called the Uaimirys. However, gatherers of natural products continued to invade the territory and the cycle of attacks on the gatherers and government reprisals continued. Entire villages were destroyed.

The SPI was replaced by the Fundação Nacional do Índio (National Indian Foundation – Funai) in 1967. Gilberto Pinto Figueiredo of Funai began friendly contacts with the indigenous people to prepare them for construction of the BR-174 highway across their land, then was replaced by Italian priest Giovanni Calleri in an effort to speed up the process. Calleri led an expedition of ten people into the territory. All but one member were killed, and Figueiredo was reappointed. Funai established the Waimiri-Atroari Attraction Front (FAWA) in 1970 with the goal of speeding up integration of the Indians into Brazilian society. The Waimiri Atroari Indigenous Reservation was delimited by decree 68.907 of 13 July 1971.

== Development projects ==
=== BR-174 ===
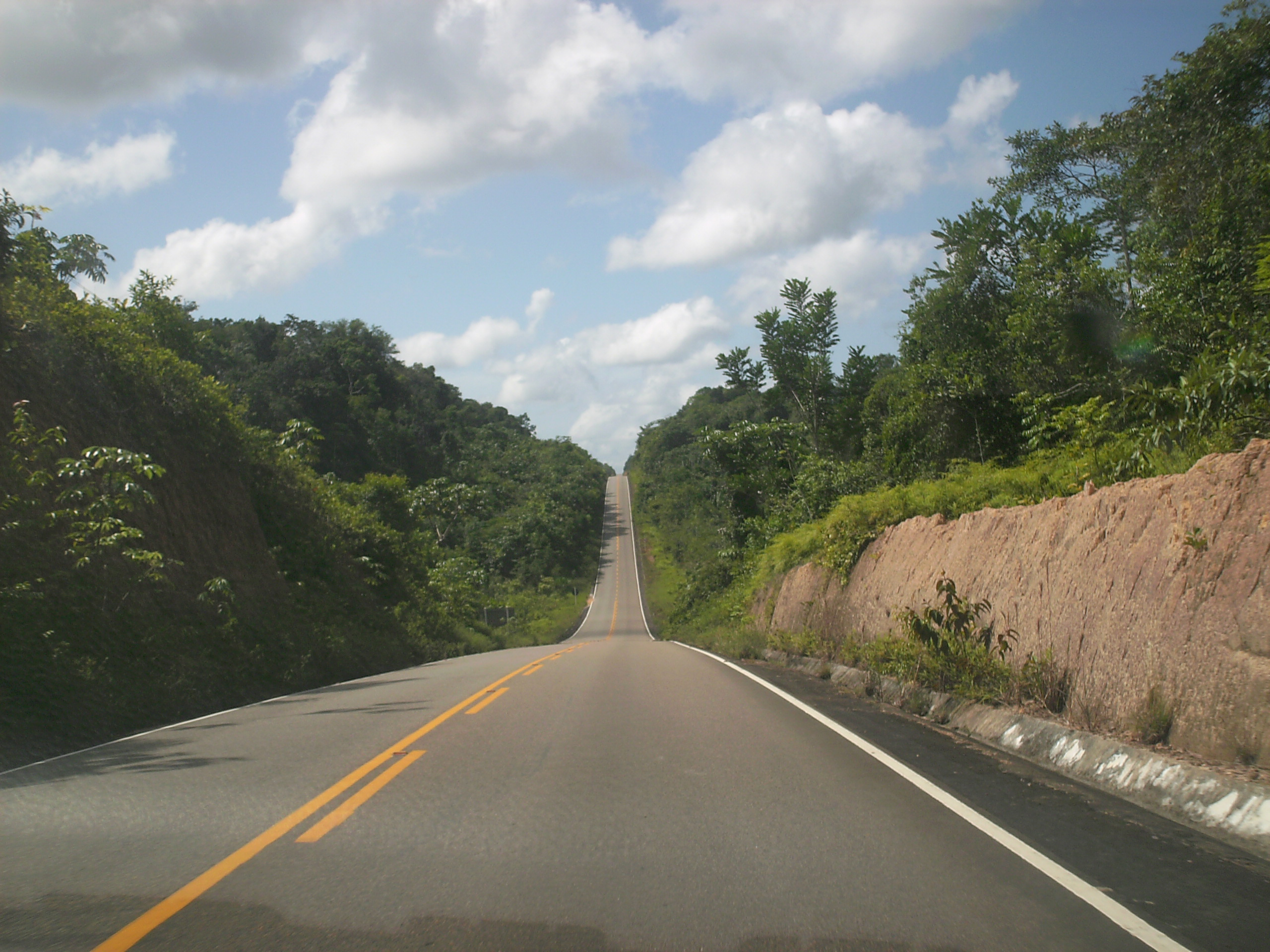
BR-174 in the Waimiri Atroari Indigenous Territory

The Roirama and Amazonas state governments decided to build a highway between Manaus and Caracaraí in the late 1960s, and asked the SPI to speed up pacification of the Indians whose territory the highway would cross. The highway project was taken over by the federal government and expanded to become highway BR-174 from Manaus to Boa Vista. The task was assigned to an army construction battalion.The section of the BR-174 running through the territory was built between 1972 and 1979. The army ignored Funai's guidelines for dealing with the Waimiri-Atroari and tensions with the Indians mounted. In 2014 the Brazilian Truth Commission published Funai estimates that the Waimiri-Atroari population fell from about 3,000 in 1972 to 1,000 in 1974. It appears to have been the goal of the military regime to eliminate the Waimiri-Atroari and other indigenous peoples.

=== Pitinga mine ===
In the 1970s the Amazon Radar Project detected deposits of cassiterite (tin ore) on the reservation. Prospectors of Mineração Taboca, a subsidiary of the Paranapanema heavy civil construction company, found traces of cassiterite in 1979 in tributaries of the Pitinga River. Paranapanema, assisted by Funai and the National Department of Mineral Production, managed to have the Waimiri Atroari Indigenous Reservation downgraded in 1981 to the Temporary Restricted Area for the Attraction and Pacification of the Waimiri Atroari Indians, with a reduced area that excluded the cassiterite deposits. Presidential decree 86.630 of 23 November 1981 removed 526,800 hectares (1,302,000 acres) from the reserve for the tin mining operations. The Pitinga mine began operations in 1982. Paranapanema extracted tin from alluvial deposits. The property was later acquired by the Peruvian company Minsur, which in 2014 had plans to develop the lower deposits, thought to be the largest undeveloped tin mine in the world.

=== Balbina Dam ===
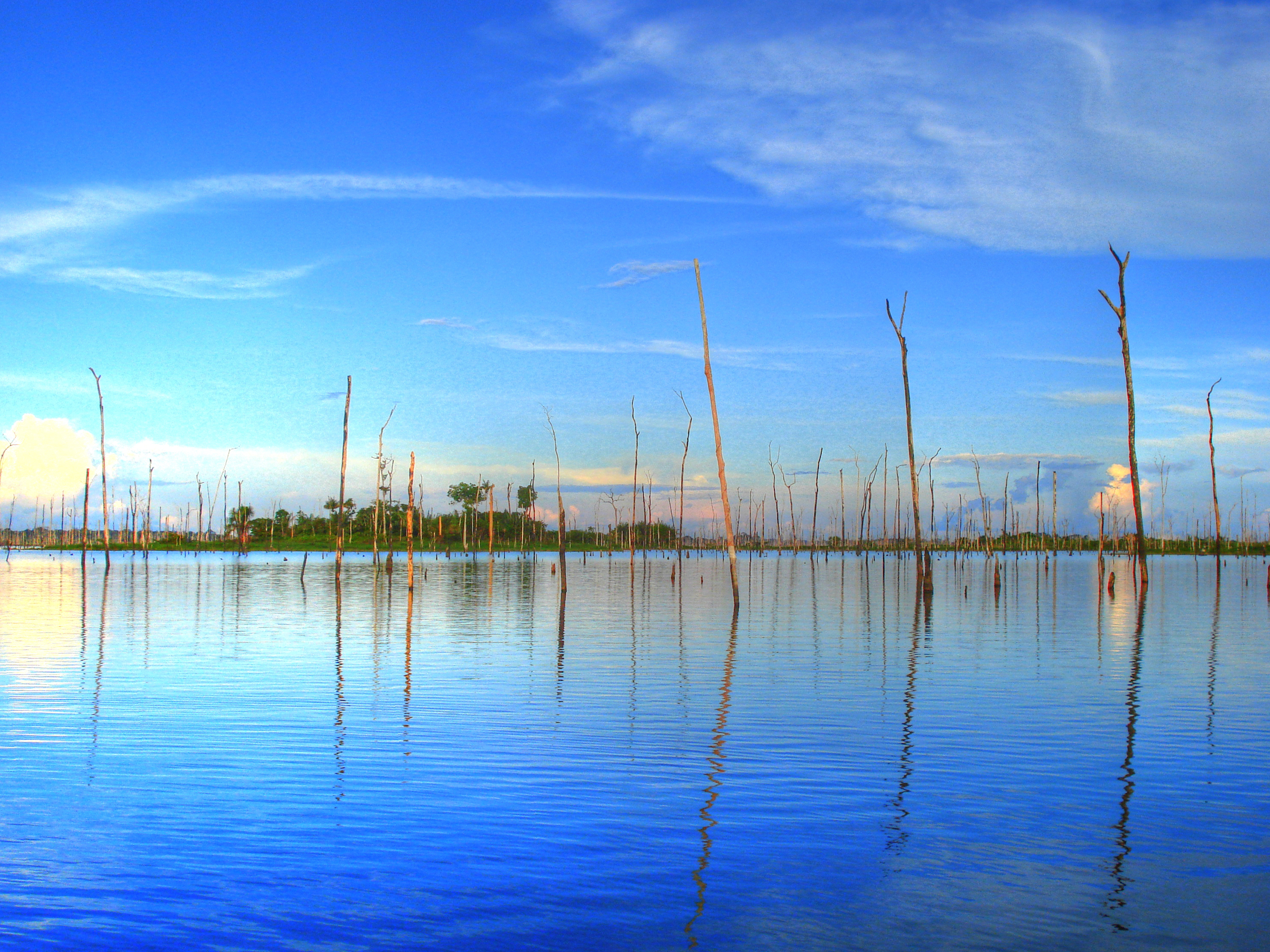
Balbina Dam in December 2008

Work on the Balbina Dam began in 1979. Presidential decree 85.898 of 13 April 1981 declared about 10,344.90 square kilometres (3,994.19 sq mi) to be land of public utility, including part of the Indian Reserve. About 2,928.5 square kilometres (1,130.7 sq mi) of land formerly occupied by the Waimiri-Atroari was flooded. The project destroyed a huge area of forest, since the Uatumã River flows through a very flat area. The amount of power generated was disappointing since the river does not deliver high volumes of water. According to the National Institute for Amazonian Research, the huge, stagnant reservoir is a "methane factory". The dam releases more greenhouse gas than any coal-fueled power plant with comparable power output. Downstream from the dam the acidic and polluted water from decomposing vegetation destroyed fish.

=== Tucuruí transmission line ===
The route chosen in 2014 for the Tucuruí transmission line, bringing electrical power from Manaus to Boa Vista, follows the BR-174 federal highway. 123 kilometres (76 mi) of the line would cross the Waimiri Atroari Indigenous Territory. In February 2016 a federal judge issued an injunction that prohibited work on the line until the Waimiri-Atroari indigenous people had been consulted. He said IBAMA had ignored the requests of the indigenous people and forced through the project without consultation, as required by the Indigenous and Tribal Peoples Convention, 1989. No public hearings had been held in the Waimiri Atroari Indigenous Territory. A leader of the indigenous people said could Funai not speak on their behalf concerning the project. Construction would involve hundreds of workers entering the territory. In March 2016 a federal judge dismissed the case, saying there had been undue judicial interference in the licensing process for the project that was of a national strategic nature and that would be undertaken entirely on federal land along the BR-174.

== Social and administrative changes (1970–present) ==
The Waimiri-Atroari attacked the Indian Posts in 1973–74 in an attempt to drive out the intruders, who had brought sickness that killed many of the people. Figueiredo and the entire staff of the attraction station was killed by the Indians in 1974. After this the people withdrew from the posts, but later some young men whose parents had died in the epidemics returned to the posts. In 1978–82 the inhabitants were moved into three large settlements near to Indian Posts by Funai workers and young "captains" of the Waimiri-Atroari. Later some of them were moved again to new settlements established by FAWA. Starting in 1984 some of the Waimiri-Atroari moved to locations further from the Indian Posts. The Attraction Front responded by setting up new Indian Posts in these places. The population had dropped to 374 people by 1988 due to the effect of foreign diseases and the frontier war.

The Northern Corridor Project (Projeto Calha Norte) was defined in 1985 by the National Security Council with the stated aim of occupying the northern frontier of Brazil with military outposts to defend against socialist regimes to the north, Colombian guerrillas and drug traffic. The project, which became active in the late 1980s, also aimed to improve highways, add hydroelectric capacity, build centres of economic development and improve social services. The Waimiri-Atroari territory is mostly in the "Interior Nucleus" part of the project zone. The Waimiri Atroari Program to mitigate the impact of the Balbina Hydroelectric Dam was proposed in 1987, covering health, education, environmental protection, agriculture and security and historical memory. Eletronorte agreed to fund the program, which was administered by Funai, and in 1989 the 2,585,911 hectares (6,389,930 acres) Waimiri Atroari Indigenous Territory was officially established. Paranapanema and Eletronorte had much greater influence than Funai, which was expected to conform to the Calha Norte requirements. This included increasing control over the Indians and preventing ethnologist and missionaries from entering the territory. The Funai workers organised the Indians into agricultural projects.

In 1996 the Indians were given R$1.7 million in compensation for the environmental damage caused by paving BR-174. BR-174 was totally paved in 1997. As of 2016 the Indians continue to block the highway from 6 p.m. to 6 a.m. each day to reduce the risk of vehicles hitting wild animals and Indians, who hunt by night. They are being sued over the blockade by the Roraima government. The most recent estimate of the population (2014) is 1,749. The people in the territory now have access to education, medical and dental services, and have a fast-growing population.

== Sources ==
- Andrews, Chris; McGuire, Matt (2016-04-20), Post-Conflict Literature: Human Rights, Peace, Justice, Routledge, ISBN 978-1-317-42506-9
- Baines, Stephen G. (2008-10-27), "The Reconstruction of Waimiri-Atroari Territory", in Adolfo de Oliveira (ed.), Decolonising Indigenous Rights, Routledge, ISBN 978-1-134-30076-1
- Balbina, a hidrelétrica que não deu certo, CEPA: Centro de Ensino e Pesquisa Aplicada
- Contemporary Waimiri Atroari society, ISA: Instituto Socioambiental
- Emery, Alex (3 April 2014), "Minsur seeking to develop Brazil's Pitinga tin mine, boost Peru reserves", Business News Americas
- "Justiça suspende licença ambiental para Linhão de Tucuruí", Folha Web (in Portuguese), Editora Boa Vista, 23 February 2016
- Justiça suspende licença prévia do Linhão de Tucuruí até consulta à indígenas (in Portuguese), Amazônia Real, 2 March 2016
- "Licença prévia do linhão do Tucuruí é suspensa pela Justiça no Amazonas", Portal Amazônia (in Portuguese), 24 February 2016, archived from the original on 17 August 2016
- Rodrigues, Eduardo Paschoal; Pinheiro, Eduardo da Silva (2011), "O desflorestamento ao longo da rodovia BR-174 (Manaus/AM - Boa Vista/RR)" (PDF), Sociedade & Natureza (in Portuguese), 23 (3), Uberlândia: 513–528, doi:10.1590/S1982-45132011000300011, ISSN 1982-4513
- Terra Indígena Waimiri Atroari (in Portuguese), ISA: Instituto Socioambiental
- The Company - History, Mineração Taboca, archived from the original on 2016-08-17
- "The rights and wrongs of Belo Monte", The Economist, 4 May 2013
- Trajano, Andrezza (7 January 2016), "Waimiri Atroari não autorizam linhão de Tucuruí em suas terras", Amazônia Real (in Portuguese)
- Valério, Luiz (12 March 2016), "Desembargador federal libera continuidade das obras do Linhão de Tucuruí", Boa Vista Agora, archived from the original on 2016-07-23
- Waimiri Atroari: Contact Situation, ISA: Instituto Socioambiental
