= Seruini River =

Coordinates: 7°41′44″S 66°40′22″W

Location
- Country: Brazil

Physical characteristics
- Source
  - location: Amazonas state

Seruini River is a river of Amazonas state in north-western Brazil.

== See also ==
- List of rivers of Amazonas
