= Tupana River =

Coordinates: 4°24′24″S 60°05′06″W

Location
- Country: Brazil

Physical characteristics
- Source
  - location: Amazonas state

Tupana River is a river of Amazonas state in north-western Brazil.

== See also ==
- List of rivers of Amazonas
