= Umari River =

- Location within Brazil
- Native name: Rio Umari (Portuguese)

Location
- Country: Brazil

Physical characteristics
- Source
  - location: Amazonas state
- Mouth
  - location: Purus River
  - coordinates: 7.076280°S 64.572116°W

Basin features
- River system: Purus River.

The Umari River is a river of Amazonas state in north-western Brazil, a tributary of the Purus River.

The river flows through the Mapinguari National Park, a 1,776,914 hectares (4,390,850 acres) conservation unit created in 2008.

== See also ==
- List of rivers of Amazonas
