= Jaú River (Amazonas) =

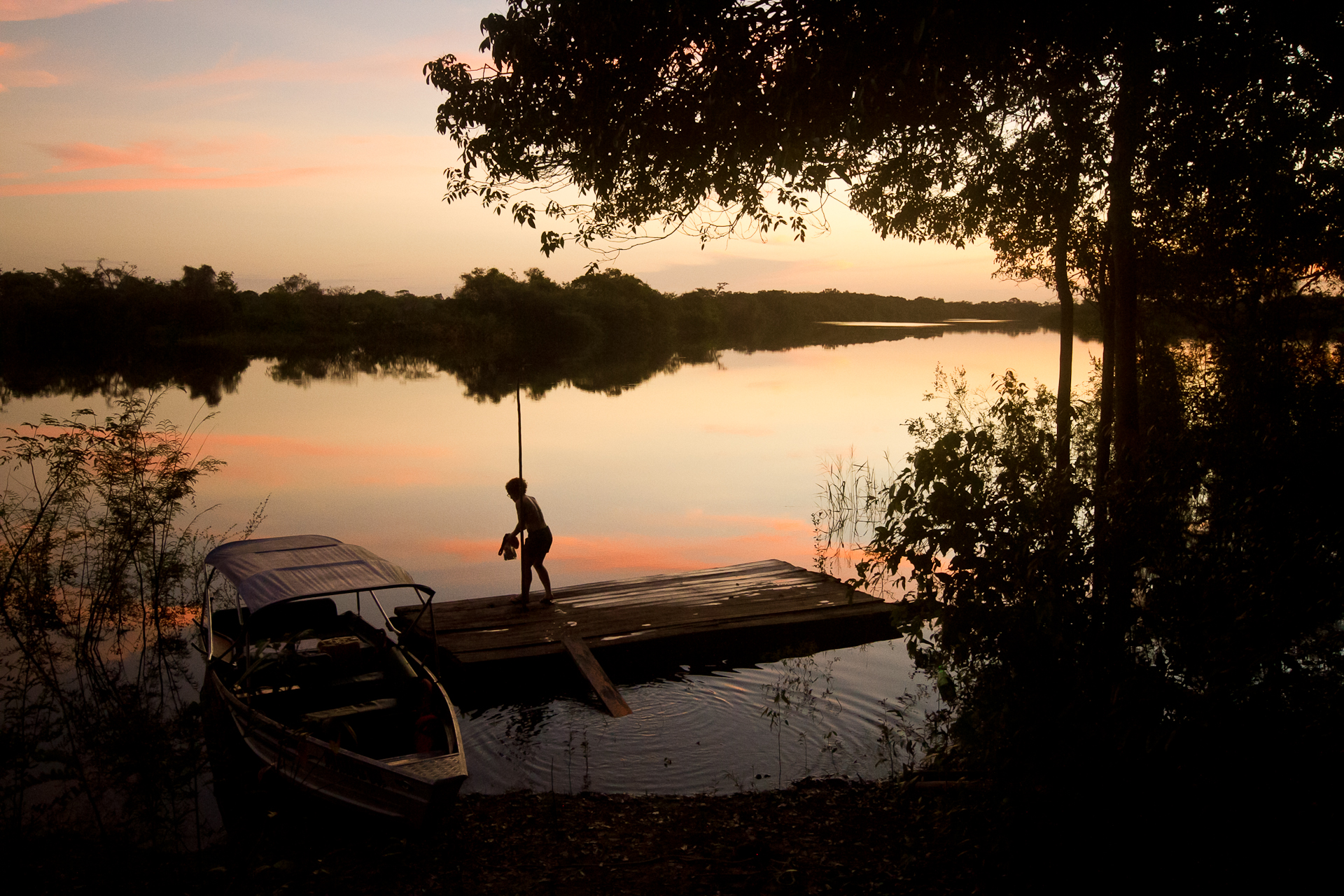
- Near Tiaracá base in Jau National Park

- Location within Brazil
- Native name: Rio Jaú (Portuguese)

Location
- Country: Brazil

Physical characteristics
- Source
  - location: Amazonas
- Mouth
  - coordinates: 1.903747°S 61.432576°W
- Length: 400 km (250 mi)
- Basin size: 19,000 km^{2} (7,300 mi^{2})
- Discharge
  - location: Confluence of Rio Negro, Amazonas State
  - average: 720 m^{3}/s (25,000 cu ft/s)

Basin features
- River system: Rio Negro

Jaú River (Portuguese: Rio Jaú) is a river of Amazonas state in north-western Brazil. It is a tributary of the Rio Negro, which itself is a tributary of the Amazon River.

== Name ==
The name "Jaú" comes from that of one of the largest fish in Brazil, the gilded catfish or jau (Zungaro zungaro).

== Basin ==
The 2,367,333 hectares (5,849,810 acres) Jaú National Park was created in 1980 to protect an area of Amazon rainforest. The park contains the entire Jaú River basin between the Unini River to the north and the Carabinani River to the south. All three rivers flow east to enter the right bank of the Rio Negro.. The Carabinani, which flows north to enter the Jaú River a few kilometres before that river enters the Rio Negro, forms the boundary between the Jaú National Park and the Rio Negro State Park North Section. The last section of the Jaú between the Carabinani and its mouth on the Rio Negro continues the boundary between the two parks.

== See also ==
- List of rivers of Amazonas

== Sources ==
- Parque Nacional do Jaú (in Portuguese), Chico Mendes Institute for Biodiversity Conservation, archived from the original on 2016-08-22
- Parque Nacional de Jaú (in Portuguese), Via Rural, archived from the original on 2016-05-09
- PES do Rio Negro Setor Norte (in Portuguese), ISA: Instituto Socioambiental
- Ziesler, R.; Ardizzone, G.D. (1979), "Amazon River System", The Inland waters of Latin America, Food and Agriculture Organization of the United Nations, ISBN 92-5-000780-9, archived from the original on 8 November 2014
