= Itaparaná River =

- Mouth location in Brazil
- Native name: Rio Itaparaná (Portuguese)

Location
- Country: Brazil

Physical characteristics
- Source
  - location: Amazonas state
- Mouth
  - location: Purus River
  - coordinates: 5°43′03″S 63°18′32″W
- Length: 370 km (230 mi)
- Basin size: 19,132.7 km^{2} (7,387.2 mi^{2})
- Discharge
  - location: Confluence of Purus, Amazonas State
  - average: 355.124 m^{3}/s (12,541.1 cu ft/s)

Basin features
- River system: Purus River

The Itaparaná River is a river of Amazonas state in north-western Brazil. It is a tributary of the Ipixuna River.

The river flows through the Purus-Madeira moist forests ecoregion in its upper reaches. It flows through the Purus várzea ecoregion, where it joins the Ipixuna shortly before that river joins the Purus River.

== See also ==
- List of rivers of Amazonas

== Sources ==
- Sears, Robin, Northern South America: Northwestern Brazil (NT0157), WWF: World Wildlife Fund
