= Aiari River =

Coordinates: 1°15′N 68°50′W

Location
- Country: Brazil

Physical characteristics
- Source
  - location: Amazonas state

Aiari River is a river of Amazonas state in north-western Brazil.

== See also ==
- List of rivers of Amazonas
