= Andirá River (Amazon River tributary) =

Location
- Country: Brazil

Physical characteristics
- Source
  - location: Amazonas state
- Mouth
  - coordinates: 2°46′S 56°50′W

The Andirá River is a river of Amazonas state in northern Brazil.

== See also ==
- List of rivers of Amazonas (Brazilian state)
