= Piratucu River =

Coordinates: 1°58′20″S 56°57′30″W

Location
- Country: Brazil

Physical characteristics
- Source
  - location: Amazonas state

Piratucu River is a river of Amazonas state in north-western Brazil.

== See also ==
- List of rivers of Amazonas
