= Mataurá River =

Location
- Country: Brazil

Physical characteristics
- Source
  - location: Amazonas state
- Mouth
  - location: Madeira River
  - coordinates: 5°34′S 60°50′W

Mataurá River (Portuguese: Rio Mataurá) is a river of Amazonas state in north-western Brazil. It is a tributary of the Madeira River, and merges into this river roughly halfway between the towns of Manicoré and Novo Aripuanã.

== See also ==
- List of rivers of Amazonas
