= Jandiatuba River =

River in Brazil

Location
- Country: Brazil
- State: Amazonas

Physical characteristics
- Mouth: Amazon River
  - location: BR
  - coordinates: 3°27′25″S 68°48′50″W
- Length: 500 km (310 mi)
- Basin size: 14,127.7 km^{2} (5,454.7 sq mi) to 14,890 km^{2} (5,750 mi^{2})
- Discharge
  - location: Confluence of Solimões, Amazonas State (near mouth)
  - average: (1971–2000)745 m^{3}/s (26,300 cu ft/s) to 980 m^{3}/s (35,000 cu ft/s)

Basin features
- Progression: Amazon → Atlantic Ocean

Jandiatuba River is a river of Amazonas state in north-western Brazil.

== See also ==
- List of rivers of Amazonas
