= Cuiari River =

Location
- Country: Brazil, Colombia

Physical characteristics
- Source
  - location: Amazonas; Guainía Department
- Mouth
  - coordinates: 1°30′N 68°11′W

Cuiari River is a river of Amazonas state in north-western Brazil and the Guainía Department of Southeastern Colombia.

== See also ==
- List of rivers of Amazonas
