= Apuaú River =

Location
- Country: Brazil

Physical characteristics
- Source
  - location: Amazonas state
- Mouth
  - coordinates: 2°32′S 60°48′W

The Apuaú River is a river in Amazonas state, in north-western Brazil. It is a left tributary of the Rio Negro, and a part of the Amazon river system.

== See also ==
- List of rivers of Amazonas
