= Alalaú River =

- Location within Brazil

Location
- Country: Brazil

Physical characteristics
- Source
  - location: Amazonas, Roraima states
- Mouth
  - location: Jauaperi River
  - coordinates: 0.499023°S 61.160683°W

Basin features
- River system: Jauaperi River

Alalaú River is a river forming part of the border between the Amazonas and Roraima states in north-western Brazil, a tributary of the Jauaperi River.

The river basin is in the 2,585,910 hectares (6,389,900 acres) Waimiri Atroari Indigenous Territory. Tailings of processed tin ore from the Pitinga mine are held in holding ponds as a reserve that may be further processed if justified by a rise in the price of tin. In 1987 the dykes of four ponds broke. The sediment was released into the Alalaú River, and the pollution affected the fish downstream in the Waimiri-Atroari Indian Reserve. The Indians reported that the polluted water had made them ill.

== See also ==
- List of rivers of Amazonas
- List of rivers of Roraima

== Sources ==
- Contemporary Waimiri Atroari society, ISA: Instituto Socioambiental
- Hall, A.; Goodman, D. (1990-11-09), The Future of Amazonia: Destruction or Sustainable Development?, Palgrave Macmillan UK, ISBN 978-1-349-21068-8
- Treece, Dave (1987), Bound in Misery and Iron: The Impact of the Grande Carajás Programme on the Indians of Brazil, Survival International, UOM:39015018820574
