= Paraconi River =

Coordinates: 3°44′49″S 58°18′30″W

Location
- Country: Brazil

Physical characteristics
- Source
  - location: Amazonas state
- Mouth
  - location: Paraná Urariá

The Paraconi River is a river in the state of Amazonas in north-western Brazil. It is located east of the Madeira River and these two are connected via the Paraná Urariá. Through the Paraná Urariá it is also connected to several other smaller rivers and ultimately Paraná do Ramos, which is a side channel of the Amazon River itself.

== See also ==
- List of rivers of Amazonas
