= Itaquai River =

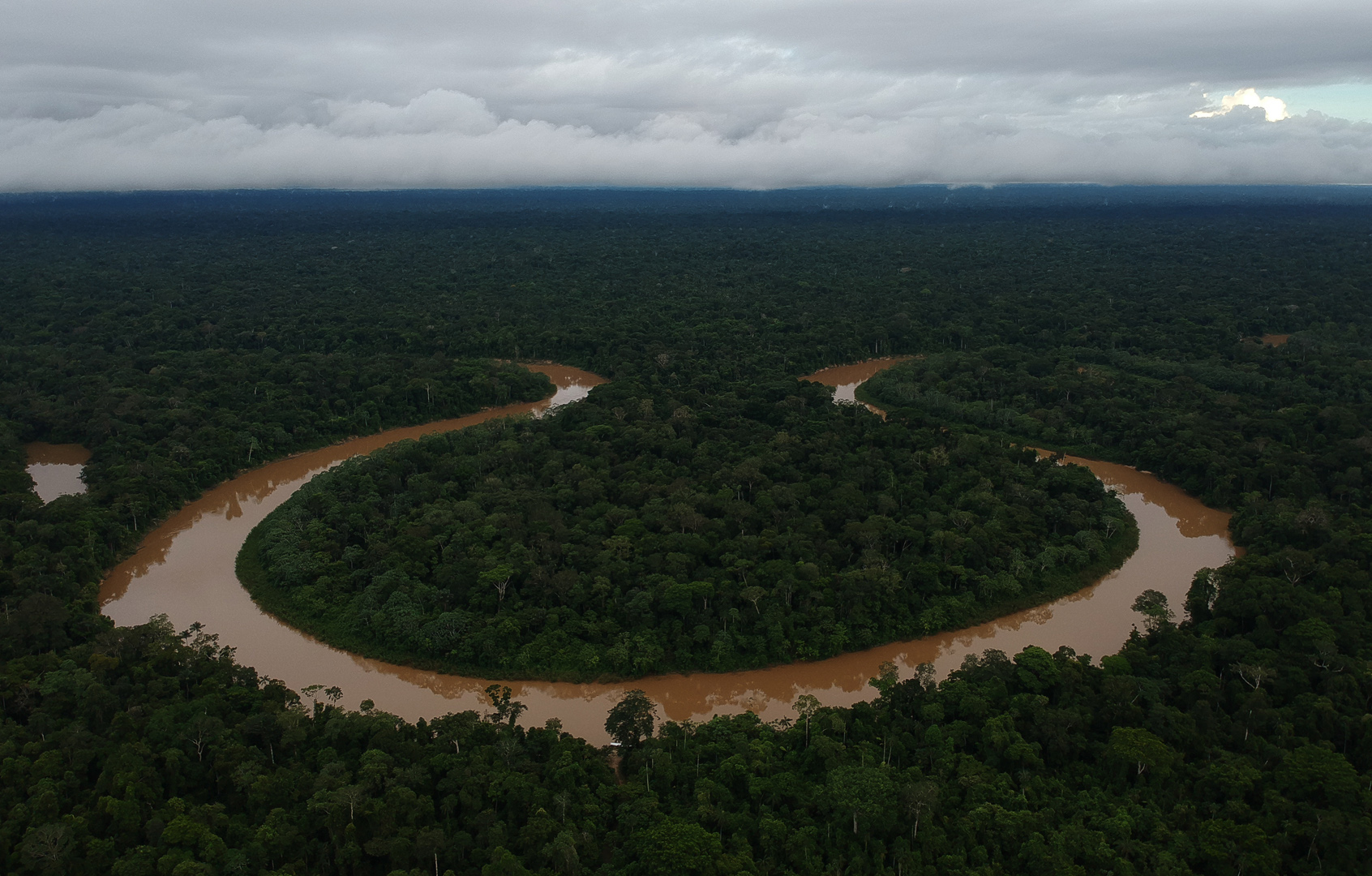

- Location within Brazil

Location
- Country: Brazil

Physical characteristics
- Source
  - location: Amazonas state
- Mouth
  - coordinates: 4°20′S 70°12′W

The Itaquai River is a river of the upper Amazon Basin. It forms the eastern boundary of Atalaia do Norte municipality in the Amazonas state of north-western Brazil. Its main tributary is the Rio Branco. Downstream it joins the Ituí River to form the upper Solimões.

== See also ==
- Korubo
- List of rivers of Amazonas
- Vale do Javari
