= Eiru River =

Coordinates: 6°41′30″S 69°50′22″W

- Location within Brazil

Location
- Country: Brazil

Physical characteristics
- Source
  - location: Amazonas state

Eiru River is a river of Amazonas state in northwestern Brazil.

== See also ==
- List of rivers of Amazonas
