= Cuniuá River =

Coordinates: 5.9606°S 64.7867°W

Location
- Country: Brazil

Physical characteristics
- Source
  - location: Amazonas state

Cuniuá River is a river of Amazonas state in north-western Brazil.

== See also ==
- List of rivers of Amazonas
