= Jutaizinho River =

Coordinates: 5°48′42″S 69°26′24″W

Location
- Country: Brazil

Physical characteristics
- Source
  - location: Amazonas state
- Mouth
  - location: Jutaí River

Jutaizinho River is a river of Amazonas state in north-western Brazil. It is a tributary of the Jutaí River.

== See also ==
- List of rivers of Amazonas
