= Igapó-Açu River =

River in Brazil

- Location within Brazil
- Native name: Rio Igapó-Açu (Portuguese)

Location
- Country: Brazil

Physical characteristics
- Source
  - location: Amazonas
- Mouth
  - coordinates: 4.394599°S 59.972657°W
- Length: 500

Basin features
- Tributaries
  - right: Matupiri River

Igapó-Açu River (Portuguese: Rio Igapó-Açu is a river of Amazonas state in north-western Brazil. It is a left tributary of the Madeira River.

The river flows through the Purus-Madeira moist forests ecoregion.

== See also ==
- List of rivers of Amazonas

== Sources ==
- Sears, Robin, Northern South America: Northwestern Brazil (NT0157), WWF: World Wildlife Fund
