= Bararati River =

River in Brazil

- Location within Brazil
- Native name: Rio Bararati (Portuguese)

Location
- Country: Brazil

Physical characteristics
- Source
  - location: State of Amazonas
- Mouth
  - location: Apuí, Amazonas
  - coordinates: 7.421772°S 58.211415°W

The Bararati River (Portuguese: Rio Bararati) is a river in the state of Amazonas, Brazil. It is a left tributary of the Juruena River.

== Course ==
The Bararati River flows from south to north through the Sucunduri State Park, a 808,312 hectares (1,997,380 acres) conservation unit created in 2005.

== See also ==
- List of rivers of Amazonas (Brazilian state)

== Sources ==
- PES do Sucunduri (in Portuguese), ISA: Instituto Socioambiental
