= Marari River =

- Location within Brazil

Location
- Country: Brazil

Physical characteristics
- Source
  - location: Amazonas state
- Mouth
  - coordinates: 0°11′N 63°10′W

Marari River is a river of Amazonas state in north-western Brazil.

== See also ==
- List of rivers of Amazonas
