= Pitinga River =

Pitinga River Rio Pitinga (Portuguese)
- Location within Brazil

Location
- Country: Brazil

Physical characteristics
- Source
  - location: Amazonas state
- Mouth
  - location: Balbina Dam
  - coordinates: 1.109841°S 59.605659°W

Basin features
- River system: Uatumã River

The Pitinga River (Portuguese: Rio Pitinga) is a river of Amazonas state in north-western Brazil. It empties into the Balbina Dam on the Uatumã River.

== Mining operation ==
In the 1970s the vast Amazon rainforest was being mapped through the Amazon Radar Project, a large-scale effort to chart remote landscapes. Among its most significant findings was the detection of cassiterite (tin ore) located near the Waimiri Atroari Indigenous Reservation.

By 1979, geologists from Mineração Taboca, then a subsidiary of the Paranapanema heavy civil construction company, found traces of cassiterite in 1979 in tributaries of the Pitinga River.

What began as small-scale exploration quickly expanded into an industrial-scale project, reshaping the region’s social and environmental landscape. The Pitinga mine began operations in 1982. The company built a community in the Amazon forest 300 kilometres (190 mi) from Manaus with housing, schools, health facilities, power and telecommunications. In 1985 Paranapanema invested US$15 million in infrastructure upgrades, including a 10,000 kilowatt hydroelectric power plant on the Pitinga River, expected to reduce energy costs by US$4 million annually.

== See also ==
- List of rivers of Amazonas

== Sources ==
- Smale-Adams, K. B. (1986), Mining Latin America / Minería Latinoamericana, Springer Science & Business Media, ISBN 978-94-017-2286-5
- The Company - History, Mineração Taboca
- Waimiri Atroari: Contact Situation, ISA: Instituto Socioambiental
