= Cubate River =

Location
- Country: Brazil

Physical characteristics
- Source
  - location: Amazonas state
- Mouth
  - coordinates: 0°32′N 67°24′W

Cubate River is a river of Amazonas state in northwestern Brazil.

== See also ==
- List of rivers of Amazonas
