= Cuini River =

Location
- Country: Brazil

Physical characteristics
- Source
  - location: Amazonas state
- Mouth
  - coordinates: 0°45′S 63°9′W

Cuini River is a river in the Amazonas state of north-western Brazil.

== See also ==
- List of rivers of Amazonas
