= Biá River =

- Location within Brazil
- Native name: Rio Biá (Portuguese)

Location
- Country: Brazil

Physical characteristics
- Source
  - location: State of Amazonas
- Mouth
  - location: Jutaí River
  - coordinates: 3.883734°S 67.533538°W
- Length: 470

Basin features
- River system: Jutaí River

The Biá River (Portuguese: Rio Biá) is a river of Amazonas state in north-western Brazil. It is a tributary of the Jutaí River.

The 2,450,380 hectares (6,055,000 acres) Cujubim Sustainable Development Reserve, established in 2003, lies on either side of the river in the municipality of Jutaí. It is the largest conservation unit in Amazonas and the largest sustainable development reserve in the world.

== See also ==
- List of rivers of Amazonas

== Sources ==
- RDS Cujubim (in Portuguese), ISA: Instituto Socioambiental
- Ziesler, R.; Ardizzone, G.D. (1979), "Amazon River System", The Inland waters of Latin America, Food and Agriculture Organization of the United Nations, ISBN 92-5-000780-9, archived from the original on 8 November 2014
