= Caurés River =

Coordinates: 1°18′05″S 62°12′10″W

Location
- Country: Brazil

Physical characteristics
- Source
  - location: Amazonas state

Caurés River is a river of Amazonas state in north-western Brazil.

== See also ==
- List of rivers of Amazonas
