= Maiá River =

Coordinates: 0°02′01″S 66°06′51″W

Location
- Country: Brazil

Physical characteristics
- Source
  - location: Amazonas state

Maiá River is a river of Amazonas state in north-western Brazil.

== See also ==
- List of rivers of Amazonas
