= Zinho River =

Location
- Country: Brazil

Physical characteristics
- Mouth: Jutaí River
  - coordinates: 2°58′S 67°7′W
- Length: 430 km (270 mi)

The Zinho River is a river in Amazonas state, Brazil.
