= Apoquitaua River =

Coordinates: 3°29′12″S 57°57′02″W

Location
- Country: Brazil

Physical characteristics
- Source
  - location: Amazonas state
- Mouth
  - location: Paraná Urariá

Apoquitaua River is a river of Amazonas state in north-western Brazil. It is located east of the Madeira River and south of the Amazon River. It is connected to both these, as well as several other smaller rivers, via the Paraná Urariá channel.

== See also ==
- List of rivers of Amazonas
