= Urupadi River =

Location
- Country: Brazil

Physical characteristics
- Source
  - location: Amazonas state
- Mouth
  - coordinates: 3°20′S 57°46′W

Urupadi River is a river in the Amazonas state in northwestern Brazil.

== See also ==
- List of rivers of Amazonas
