= Jauaperi River =

- Location within Brazil
- Native name: Rio Jauaperi (Portuguese)

Location
- Country: Brazil

Physical characteristics
- Source
  - location: Amazonas
- Mouth
  - location: Rio Negro
  - coordinates: 1.590921°S 61.472624°W
- Length: 530 km (330 mi)
- Basin size: 48,000 km^{2} (19,000 mi^{2})
- Discharge
  - location: Confluence of Rio Negro, Amazonas State
  - average: 1,300 m^{3}/s (46,000 cu ft/s)

Basin features
- River system: Rio Negro
- Tributaries
  - left: Alalaú River

The Jauaperi River (Portuguese: Rio Jauaperi) is a river of Amazonas state in northwestern Brazil, a tributary of the Rio Negro.

The lower section of the river forms part of the border between Amazonas and Roraima. Most of the river basin is in the 2,585,910 hectares (6,389,900 acres) Waimiri Atroari Indigenous Territory.

== See also ==
- List of rivers of Amazonas

== Sources ==
- Contemporary Waimiri Atroari society, ISA: Instituto Socioambiental
- Ziesler, R.; Ardizzone, G.D. (1979), "Amazon River System", The Inland waters of Latin America, Food and Agriculture Organization of the United Nations, ISBN 92-5-000780-9, archived from the original on 8 November 2014
