= Jacaré River (Purus River tributary) =

Location
- Country: Brazil

Physical characteristics
- Source
  - location: Amazonas state
- Mouth: Purus River
  - coordinates: 5°46′S 63°40′W

Jacaré River is a river of Amazonas state in north-western Brazil. It is a tributary of the Purus River.

== See also ==
- List of rivers of Amazonas
