= Guariba River (Pauini River tributary) =

Location
- Country: Brazil

Physical characteristics
- Source
  - location: Amazonas state
- Mouth
  - location: Pauini River
  - coordinates: 1°53′S 63°7′W

Guariba River is a river of Amazonas state in western Brazil. It is a tributary of the Pauini River, which itself is indirectly a tributary of the Rio Negro.

== See also ==
- List of rivers of Amazonas
