= Ciriquiri River =

Coordinates: 8°05′S 65°18′W

Location
- Country: Brazil

Physical characteristics
- Source
  - location: Amazonas state

Ciriquiri River is a river of Amazonas state in north-western Brazil.

== See also ==
- List of rivers of Amazonas
