= Urubaxi River =

Coordinates: 0°30′53″S 64°49′49″W

Location
- Country: Brazil

Physical characteristics
- Source
  - location: Amazonas state

Urubaxi River (Portuguese: Rio Urubaxi) is a river of Amazonas state in north-western Brazil.

== See also ==
- List of rivers of Amazonas
