= Padauari River =

Coordinates: 0°08′05″S 64°06′20″W

Location
- Country: Brazil

Physical characteristics
- Source
  - location: Amazonas state

Padauari River is a river of Amazonas state in north-western Brazil.

== See also ==
- List of rivers of Amazonas
