= Urucu River =

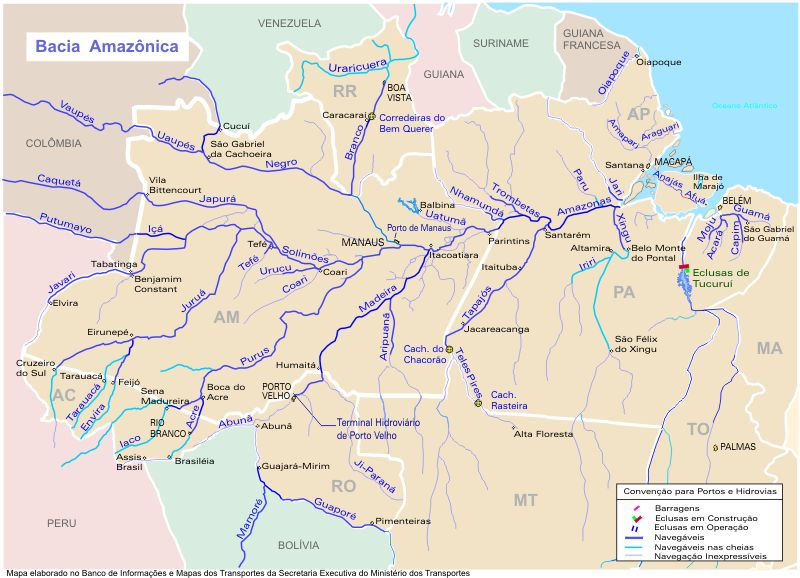
- Urucu River center-left (west of Manaus)

Location
- Country: Brazil

Physical characteristics
- Source
  - location: Amazonas state
- Mouth
  - coordinates: 4°12′S 63°38′W

Urucu River is a southern tributary of the Amazon River (Solimões section) in the Amazonas state in north-western Brazil.

== See also ==
- List of rivers of Amazonas
