= Ipixuna River (Juruá River tributary) =

Location
- Country: Brazil

Physical characteristics
- Source
  - location: Amazonas state
- Mouth
  - location: Juruá River
  - coordinates: 7°15′S 72°20′W

Ipixuna River is a river of Amazonas state in north-western Brazil. It is a left tributary of the Juruá River.

== See also ==
- List of rivers of Amazonas
