= Paraná do Urariá =

- Location within Brazil

Location
- Country: Brazil

Physical characteristics
- Source
  - location: Amazonas
- Mouth
  - coordinates: 3.061350°S 57.721263°W
- Length: 400 km (250 mi)
- Basin size: 127,116 km^{2} (49,080 mi^{2})
- Discharge
  - location: Near mouth, Amazonas
  - average: 4,804.4 m^{3}/s (169,670 cu ft/s)

Basin features
- Tributaries
  - right: Canumã, Abacaxis, Maués Açu, Apoquitaua, Paraconi

The Paraná do Urariá is a river of Amazonas state in north-western Brazil. It is a side channel that connects the Madeira River (via the short Paraná do Canumã) and Amazonas River (via Paraná do Ramos). The Maués Açu, Apoquitaua, Paraconi, Abacaxis and Canumã Rivers all flow into the Paraná do Urariá.

The 59,137 hectares (146,130 acres) Urariá Sustainable Development Reserve, created in 2001, is on the left bank of the Paraná do Urariá.

== See also ==
- List of rivers of Amazonas
