= Rio Jutaí Extractive Reserve =

Federal level Extractive Reserve in Brazil

- Reserva Extrativista do Rio Jutaí
- IUCN category VI (protected area with sustainable use of natural resources)
- Location within Brazil
- Nearest city: Jutaí, Amazonas
- Coordinates: 3°29′59″S 67°21′06″W
- Area: 275,533 hectares (680,860 acres)
- Designation: Extractive reserve
- Created: 17 July 2002
- Administrator: Chico Mendes Institute for Biodiversity Conservation

The Rio Jutaí Extractive Reserve (Portuguese: Reserva Extrativista do Rio Jutaí) is an extractive reserve in the state of Amazonas, Brazil.

== Location ==
The Rio Jutaí Extractive Reserve is in the municipality of Jutaí, Amazonas. It has an area of 275,533 hectares (680,860 acres). The Jutaí River forms the western boundary of the northern part of the reserve. The Jutaí-Solimões Ecological Station is on the west bank of the Jutaí River opposite the north of the reserve. In the south the reserve extends to the west of the river. The extreme south of the reserve adjoins the Rio Biá Indigenous Reserve. To the east the reserve is bounded by the Riozinho River, with an indigenous territory to the east of the river.

== History ==
The Rio Jutaí Extractive Reserve was created by federal decree on 17 July 2002 with the objectives of assuring sustainable use and conservation of renewable resources, and protection of the livelihood and culture of the local extractive population. It is classed as IUCN protected area category VI (protected area with sustainable use of natural resources). It became part of the Central Amazon Ecological Corridor, established in 2002. The reserve is administered by the Chico Mendes Institute for Biodiversity Conservation.

The deliberative council was created on 27 July 2006 and the management plan was approved on 25 September 2012. The management plan was developed in partnership with the University of Technology of Amazonas (UTAM) and the Federal University of Amazonas (UFAM), coordinated by the National Center for the Support of Traditional Populations (CNPT/AM).

== Economy ==
The reserve contains the communities of Mararauá, Berdolé, São Francisco do Capivara, São Raimundo do Cariru, Pururé, São Raimundo do Piranha and Vila Efraim, as well as isolated residents. As of 2010 the reserve supported 809 people in 116 families. The main economic activities were plant extraction and fishing. There is productive potential with latex (rubber), and with extraction of vegetable oils from species such as andiroba, copaiba, jatoba and carapanaúba.

== Sources ==
- CEC Central da Amazônia (in Portuguese), ISA: Instituto Socioambiental
- RESEX do Rio Jutaí (in Portuguese), ISA: Instituto Socioambiental
- Resex Rio Jutaí (in Portuguese), ICMBio: Chico Mendes Institute for Biodiversity Conservation
- Unidade de Conservação: Reserva Extrativista do Rio Jutaí (in Portuguese), MMA: Ministério do Meio Ambiente
