= Waimiri-Atroari =

Indigenous group in Brazil

Kinja

Total population
- 1,515 (Dec 2011)

Regions with significant populations
- Brazil (Amazonas, Roraima)

Languages
- Waimiri-Atroarí language, a Carib language

Religion
- Animism

The Waimiri-Atroari or Uaimiris-Atroari are an Indigenous group inhabiting the southeastern part of the Brazilian state of Roraima and northeastern Amazonas, specifically the Waimiri Atroari Indigenous Territory. They call themselves Kinja.

They are part of the Kalina people, whose historical territory is located in the south of the current state of Roraima and Amazonas.

During the 19th century, they were known as the Crichanás, when expansionary segments of surrounding Brazilian people made first contact with them.

== History ==
First contact with the Waimiri Atroari occurred in the 17th century with the Spanish and Portuguese crown spreading to gain more territory. First official contact with the Waimiri Atroari took place in 1884 with Joãno Barbosa Rodrigues who enlisted the Waimiri Atroari as guides. At this point in time the Waimiri Atroari already had a reputation for being violent and Rodrigues sought to change the stereotypes associated with the group.

In 1911 a member of the SPI (Indian Protection Services) made contact with the Waimiri Atroari, the following year the First Indian Attraction Station was established. Despite friendly contact the government of this region saw the great wealth of resources that the native land possessed and encouraged the invasion of the land in order to exploit the natural resources. As a result, the Waimiri Atroari took up defense of their land with bows and arrows. This led to many acts of violence between the Waimiri Atroari and non-Indigenous people, with military forces used to combat the Indigenous group and wiping out entire villages. The next large scale conflict with the Waimiri Atroari that has been documented is in the 1960s with the Amazonas State and Roraima Territory Government's plan for a highway between Manaus and Caracarai, cutting directly through Indigenous land. This project brought in individuals and teams to "pacify" the Waimiri Atroari as well as Military forces to build the highway and intimidate the Indigenous people. As a result of high tension and disagreements most of the non-Indigenous pacifists were killed by the Waimiri Atroari.

In 1971 the Waimiri Atroari Indigenous Reservation was created, however between plans for Amazonas expansion and the discovery of cassiterite deposits, the government continued to infringe on the land. The reserve was demoted to a Temporary Restricted Area for the Attraction and Pacification of the Waimiri Atroari Indians in 1981 in order to exclude the mineral deposits from their land. Later more land was taken from the Waimiri Atroari as a hydroelectric plant project flooded over 30,000 hectares of their land. Today the Waimiri Atroari have their own school system which they control independently.
