= Carabinani River =

- Location within Brazil
- Native name: Rio Carabinani (Portuguese)

Location
- Country: Brazil

Physical characteristics
- Source
  - location: Amazonas state
- Mouth
  - location: Jaú River
  - coordinates: 1.953249°S 61.513087°W

Basin features
- River system: Jaú River

The Carabinani River (Portuguese: Rio Carabinani is a river in the Amazonas state in north-western Brazil. It is a right tributary of the Jaú River

== Course ==
The Carabinani River, which flows north east to enter the Jaú River a few kilometres before that river enters the Rio Negro, forms the boundary between the Jaú National Park on its left and the 146,028 hectares (360,840 acres) Rio Negro State Park North Section on its right.

== See also ==
- List of rivers of Amazonas

== Sources ==
- PES do Rio Negro Setor Norte (in Portuguese), ISA: Instituto Socioambiental
