= Piorini River =

Coordinates: 3°33′57″S 63°01′32″W

Location
- Country: Brazil

Physical characteristics
- Source
  - location: Amazonas state

The Piorini River (Portuguese: Rio Piorini) is a river in Amazonas state in north-western Brazil. It ends in the Badajos River.

== See also ==
- List of rivers of Amazonas
