= Pauini River (Purus River tributary) =

Coordinates: 7.7989°S 67.0933°W

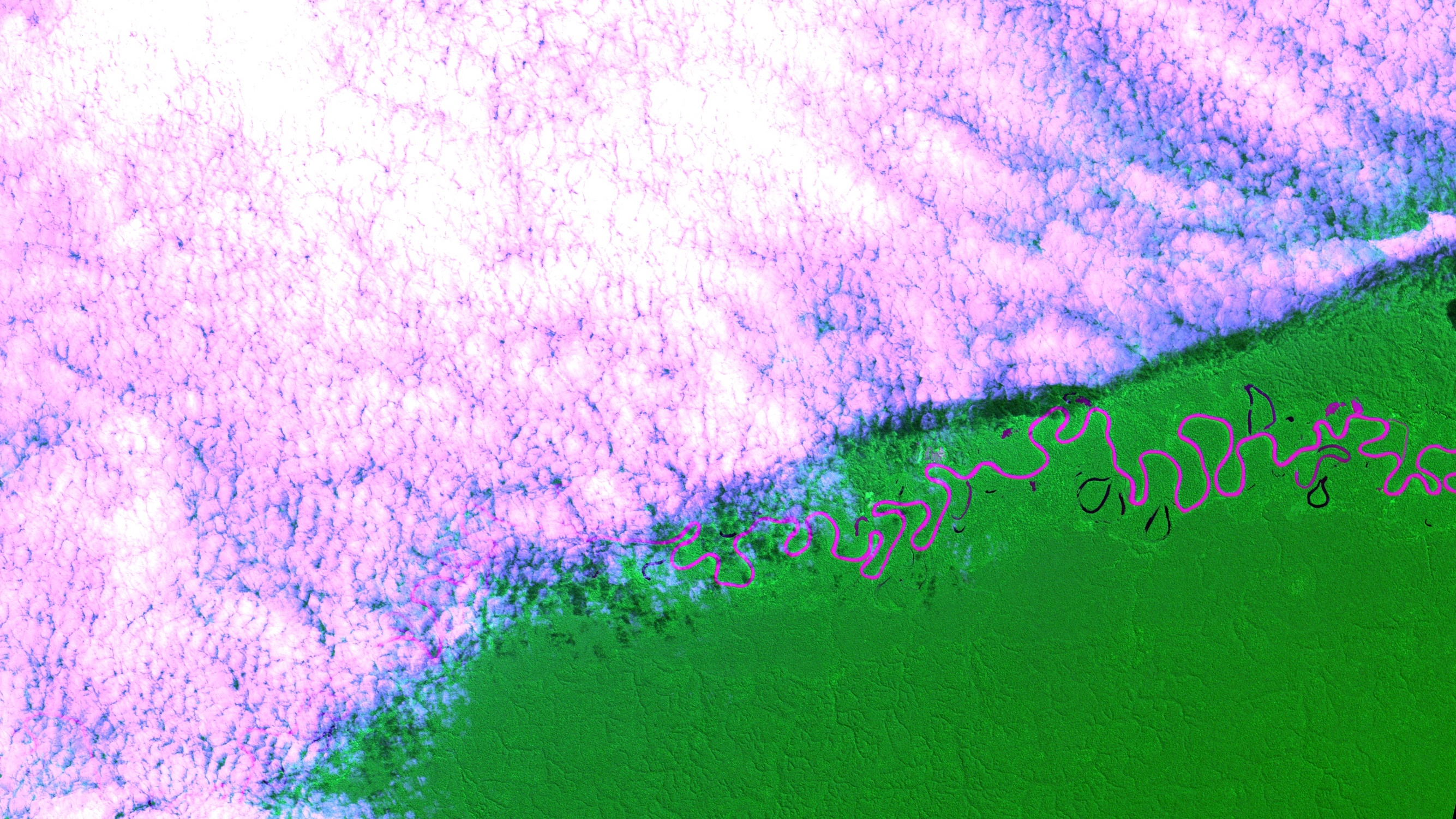

- Location within Brazil

Location
- Country: Brazil

Physical characteristics
- Mouth: Purus River
- Length: 450 km (280 mi)
- Basin size: 25,234.3 km^{2} (9,743.0 mi^{2})
- Discharge
  - location: Confluence of Purus, Amazonas State
  - average: 730.466 m^{3}/s (25,796.2 cu ft/s)

Pauini River is a river of Amazonas state in north-western Brazil. It is a tributary of the Purus River.

== See also ==
- List of rivers of Amazonas
