= Pauini River (Unini River tributary) =

Location
- Country: Brazil

Physical characteristics
- Source
  - location: Amazonas state
- Mouth: Unini River
  - coordinates: 1°42′S 62°50′W

Pauini River is a river of Amazonas state in north-western Brazil. It is a tributary of the Unini River.

== See also ==
- List of rivers of Amazonas
