= Ipixuna River (Madeira River tributary) =

Location
- Country: Brazil

Physical characteristics
- Source
  - location: Amazonas state
- Mouth: Madeira River
  - coordinates: 6°16′S 61°52′W

Ipixuna River is a river of Amazonas state in northwestern Brazil. It is a tributary of the Madeira River.

== See also ==
- List of rivers of Amazonas
