= Abacaxis River =

River in Amazonas, Brazil

- Location within Brazil

Location
- Country: Brazil

Physical characteristics
- Source
  - location: Amazonas
- Mouth
  - coordinates: 3.913383°S 58.785378°W
- Length: 610

Basin features
- Tributaries
  - left: Marimari River
  - right: Curauaí River

The Abacaxis River is a river in the Amazonas state in north-western Brazil. It is located east of the Madeira River and these two are connected via the Paraná Urariá.

Through the Paraná Urariá it is also connected to several other smaller rivers and ultimately Paraná do Ramos, which is a side channel of the Amazon River itself. The Abacaxis River also passes through Lake Guaribas. The river flows through the 896,411 hectares (2,215,080 acres) Acari National Park created by president Dilma Rousseff in 2016 in the last week before her provisional removal from office. The river forms the western boundary of the Alto Maués Ecological Station and of the Pau-Rosa National Forest.
