= Sepoti River =

Coordinates: 6°43′41″S 61°38′36″W

Location
- Country: Brazil

Physical characteristics
- Source
  - location: Amazonas state

Sepoti River is a river of Amazonas state in north-western Brazil.

== See also ==
- List of rivers of Amazonas
