= Sierra del Divisor =

Mountain range in South America

- Location within Peru

Highest point
- Coordinates: 7.963023°S 73.782124°W

Geography
- Location: Peru and Brazil

Sierra del Divisor is a mountain range located in the border between Peru and Brazil, rising up from the Amazonian plain. It is the only mountainous area in the lower Amazonian jungle. The best-known feature of the range is a pyramid-like mountain called El Cono, which in clear weather is visible from the Andes far to the west.

On November 8, 2015, the Peruvian government announced it had designated 3.3 million acres of rainforest in the mountain range as a national park.
