= Jutaí River =

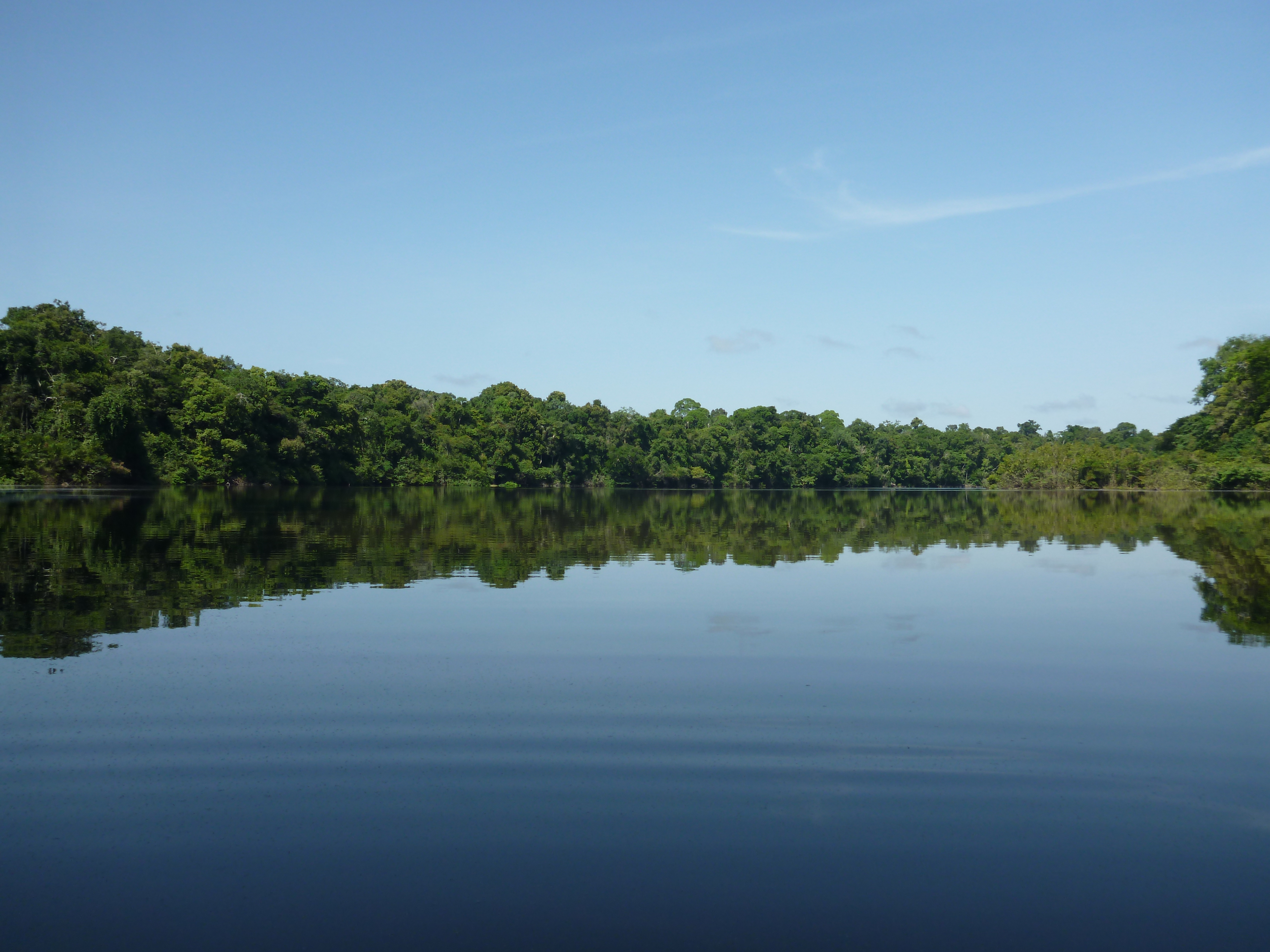

- Location within Brazil
- Native name: Rio Jutai (Portuguese)

Location
- Country: Brazil

Physical characteristics
- Source
  - location: State of Amazonas
- Mouth
  - location: Jutaí, Amazon River
  - coordinates: 2.745032°S 66.785708°W
- Length: 1,488 km (925 mi)
- Basin size: 79,374 km^{2} (30,646 mi^{2})
- Discharge
  - location: Confluence of Solimões, Amazonas State (near mouth)
  - average: (Period: 1979–2015)3,462 m^{3}/s (122,300 cu ft/s)

Basin features
- Progression: Amazon → Atlantic Ocean
- River system: Solimões
- Tributaries
  - left: Copatana, Pati
  - right: Biá, Mutum, Jutaizinho

The Jutaí River (Portuguese: Rio Jutaí) is a river in Amazonas state in north-western Brazil.

== Course ==
The river flows through the Juruá-Purus moist forests ecoregion. The Jutaí river runs northeast before reaching its mouth on the southern bank of the Amazon River (Solimões section). It is west of the Juruá River, and is roughly parallel to the lower Juruá.

The 2,450,380 hectares (6,055,000 acres) Cujubim Sustainable Development Reserve, established in 2003, lies on either side of the river in the municipality of Jutaí. It is the largest conservation unit in Amazonas and the largest sustainable development reserve in the world. Further downstream the river forms the boundary between the 275,533 hectares (680,860 acres) Rio Jutaí Extractive Reserve, created in 2002, to the southeast and the Jutaí-Solimões Ecological Station to the northwest.

== See also ==
- List of rivers of Amazonas

== Sources ==
- RDS Cujubim (in Portuguese), ISA: Instituto Socioambiental
- RESEX do Rio Jutaí (in Portuguese), ISA: Instituto Socioambiental
- Ziesler, R.; Ardizzone, G.D. (1979), "Amazon River System", The Inland waters of Latin America, Food and Agriculture Organization of the United Nations, ISBN 92-5-000780-9, archived from the original on 8 November 2014
