= Javary River =

River in Brazil & Peru

Javary River Javari River
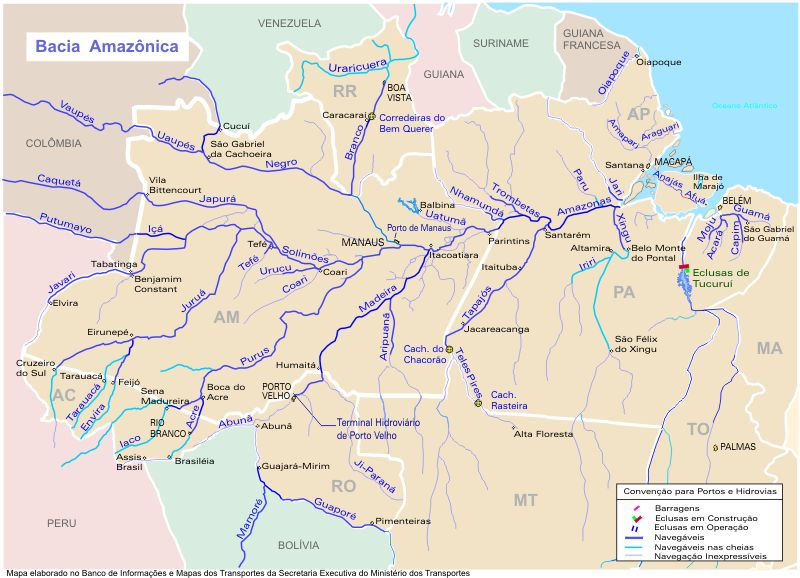
- Javary/Javari on the far left (only lower part of river highlighted on this map)

Location
- Country: Brazil, Peru

Physical characteristics
- Source
  - location: Sierra de Contamana, Ucayali, Peru
  - elevation: 565 m (1,854 ft)
- Mouth: Amazon River
  - location: Amazonas, Brazil
  - coordinates: 4°22′58″S 70°1′51″W
  - elevation: 61 m (200 ft)
- Length: 1,309.44 km (813.65 mi)
- Basin size: 99,674.09 km^{2} (38,484.38 sq mi) to 109,680.1 km^{2} (42,347.7 mi^{2})
- Discharge
  - location: Benjamin Constant, Amazonas State (near mouth)
  - average: (Period: 1971–2000)5,224.5 m^{3}/s (184,500 cu ft/s) (Period: 1973–1990)4,545 m^{3}/s (160,500 cu ft/s)
- Discharge
  - location: Estirão do Repouso, Amazonas State (Basin size: 58,107 km^{2} (22,435 sq mi)
  - average: (Period of data: 1970–1996)2,503 m^{3}/s (88,400 cu ft/s)

Basin features
- Progression: Amazon → Atlantic Ocean
- River system: Solimões
- Tributaries
  - left: Curuçá, Ituí
  - right: Gálvez, Yavari-Mirim

The Javary River, Javari River or Yavarí River (Spanish: Río Yavarí; Portuguese: Rio Javari) is a 1,184 km (736 mi) tributary of the Amazon that forms the boundary between Brazil and Peru for more than 500 km (310 mi). It is navigable by canoe for 900 km (560 mi) from above its mouth to its source in the Ucayali highlands, but only 260 were found suitable for steam navigation.

The Brazilian Boundary Commission ascended it in 1866 to the junction of the Shino with its Jaquirana branch. The country it traverses in its extremely sinuous course is very level, similar in character to that of the Juruá.

There are a number of small private reserves along the river, which arrange wildlife viewing.

The town of Benjamin Constant lies at the mouth of the river, on the Brazilian bank.
