= Atalaia do Norte =

Municipality of Amazonas, Brazil

- Municipality
- The Municipality of Atalaia do Norte
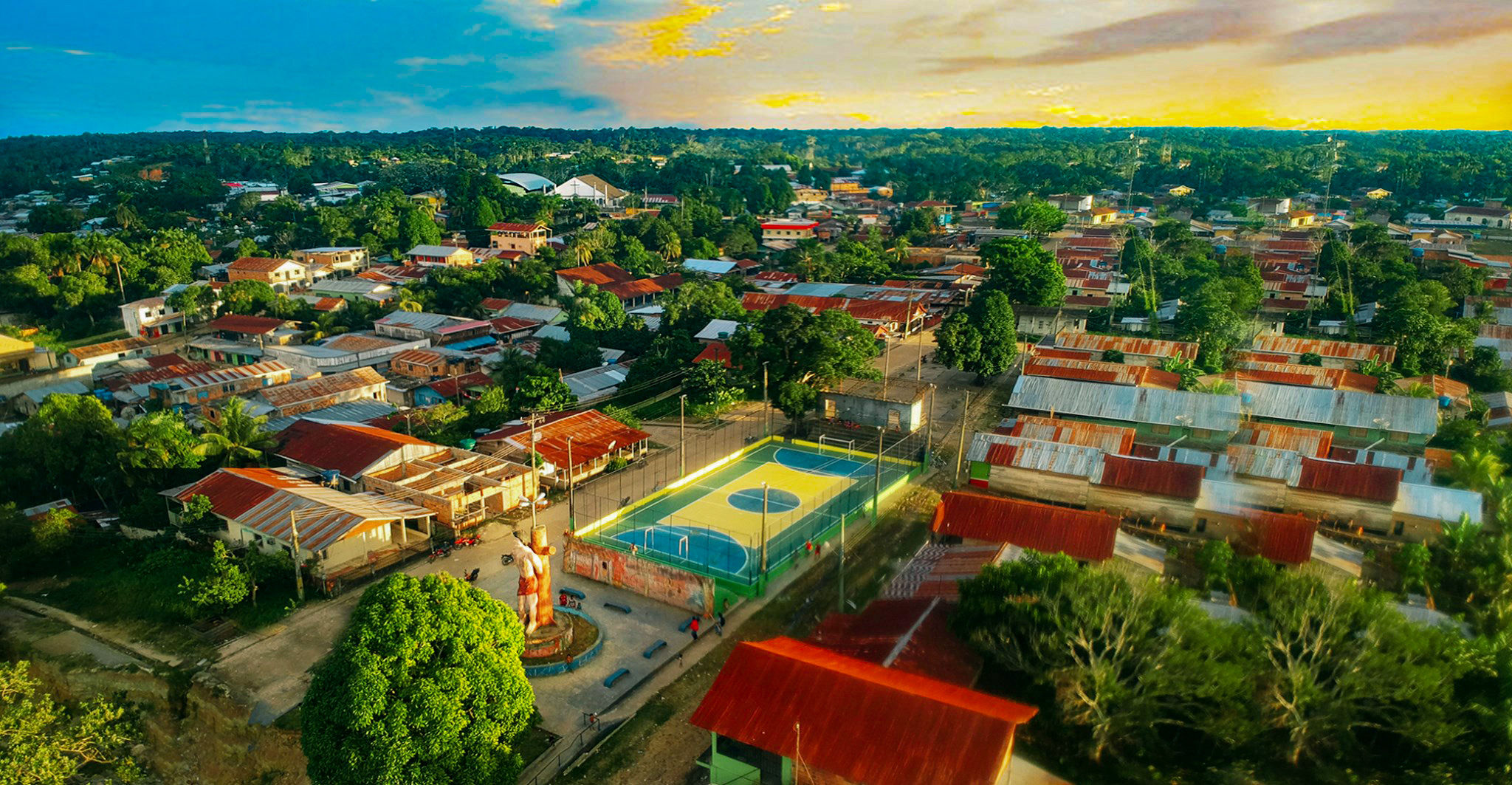

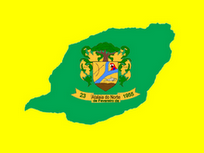
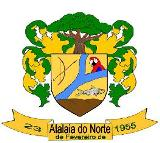
- Flag Coat of arms
- Nickname: "Pérola do Javari" (Javari's Pearl)
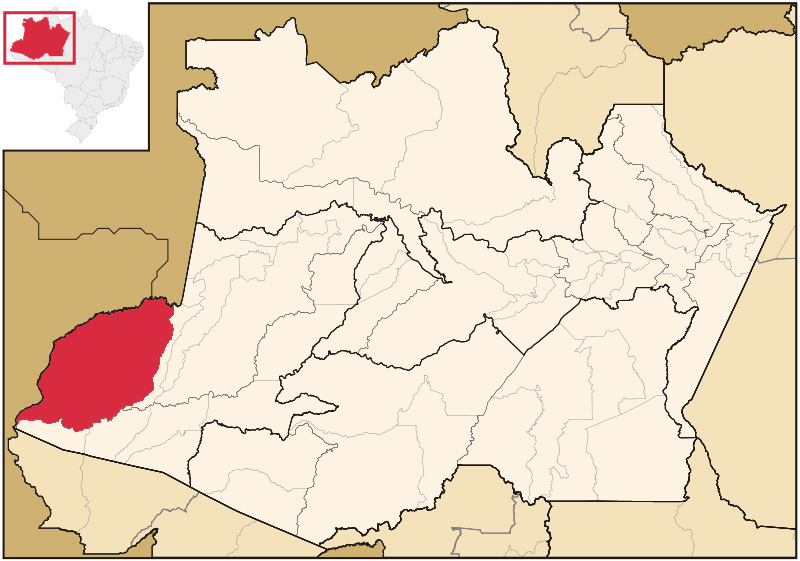
- Location in the Estado do Amazonas

- Location in Brazil
- Coordinates: 04°22′19″S 70°11′31″W
- Country: Brazil
- Region: Norte
- State: Amazonas
- Founded: December 19, 1955

Government
  - Mayor: Nonato do Nascimento Tenazor (PDT)

Area
  - Total: 76,355 km^{2} (29,481 sq mi)
- Elevation: 65 m (213 ft)

Population (2020)
  - Total: 20,398
  - Density: 0.17/km^{2} (0.44/sq mi)
- Time zone: UTC−5 (ACT)
- HDI (2000): 0.559 – medium

Atalaia do Norte is the most western municipality in the Brazilian state of Amazonas. As of 2020, its population was 20,398 and its area is 76,355 km^{2}, thus making it the third largest municipality in Amazonas and the seventh largest in Brazil.

== Geography ==
The area of this municipality includes the Vale do Javari, an indigenous reserve which is inhabited until the present day by isolated Amerindians also called "arrow peoples", indigenous ethnic groups that have had little or no contact with the rest of the world. The town is located at the start of the Itaquai River.
