= Unini River =

- Location within Brazil
- Native name: Rio Unini (Portuguese)

Location
- Country: Brazil

Physical characteristics
- Source
  - location: Amazonas
  - coordinates: 1.687561°S 63.810452°W
- Mouth
  - location: Rio Negro, Amazonas
  - coordinates: 1.6736°S 61.5061°W
- Length: 400 km (250 mi)
- Basin size: 27,000 km^{2} (10,000 mi^{2})
- Discharge
  - location: Confluence of Rio Negro, Amazonas State
  - average: 1,050 m^{3}/s (37,000 cu ft/s)

Basin features
- River system: Rio Negro

The Unini River (Portuguese: Rio Unini) is a river located in the Amazonas state in north-western Brazil. It serves as a right tributary of the Rio Negro.

== Course ==
The Unini River originates from the confluence of the Água Preta stream and the Preto River. From there, it flows eastward towards the Rio Negro, serving as the border between the Rio Unini Extractive Reserve to the north and the Jaú National Park to the south. The river basin has about 1,500 streams and over 1,000 lakes, with an estimated length of 400 kilometres (250 mi) from its mouth to the headwaters. The basin covers approximately 2,689,644 hectares (6,646,260 acres). The largest tributaries are the Papagaio, Paunini and Solimõezinho streams.

The Unini River is characterized by its generally acidic water with minimal suspended material. Its meandering course, along with its tributaries, gives rise to a diverse array of aquatic environments, including lakes, rivers, creeks, and flooded forests. Water levels in the river exhibit seasonal fluctuations, with the lowest levels typically occurring between October and November, and the highest levels between June and July. The range of water levels varies from minimum to maximum between 11.26 and 15.75 metres (36.9 and 51.7 ft).

== See also ==
- List of rivers of Amazonas

== Sources ==
- RESEX Rio Unini (in Portuguese), ISA: Instituto Socioambiental
- Unidade de Conservação: Reserva Extrativista Rio Unini (in Portuguese), MMA: Ministério do Meio Ambiente
