= Uarini River =

- Location within Brazil
- Native name: Rio Uarini (Portuguese)

Location
- Country: Brazil

Physical characteristics
- Source
  - location: Amazonas state
- Mouth
  - location: Uarini, Amazonas
  - coordinates: 2.981858°S 65.110090°W

Basin features
- River system: Solimões River
- Tributaries
  - right: Copacá River

The Uarini River (Portuguese: Rio Uarini) is a river of Amazonas state in north-western Brazil. It is a tributary of the Solimões River.

The Uarini River flows north through the 187,982 hectares (464,510 acres) Baixo Juruá Extractive Reserve, created in 2001. It then flows in a roughly northeast direction, entering the Solimões near the town of Uarini.

== See also ==
- List of rivers of Amazonas
