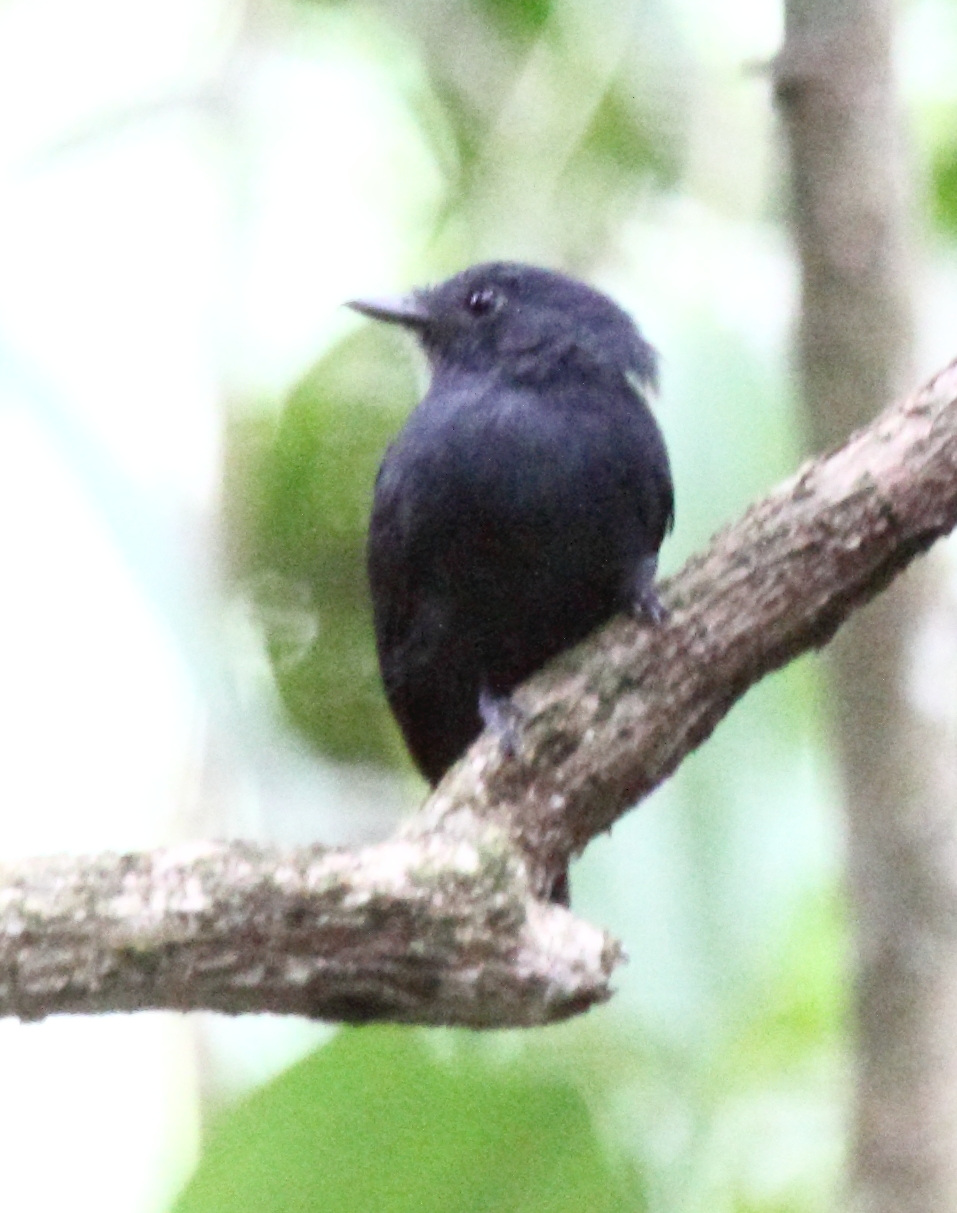

Conservation status
- Least Concern (IUCN 3.1)

Scientific classification
- Kingdom: Animalia
- Phylum: Chordata
- Class: Aves
- Order: Passeriformes
- Family: Thamnophilidae
- Genus: Thamnomanes
- Species: T. schistogynus

Binomial name
- Thamnomanes schistogynus Hellmayr, 1911

= Bluish-slate antshrike =

Species of bird

The bluish-slate antshrike (Thamnomanes schistogynus) is a species of bird in subfamily Thamnophilinae of family Thamnophilidae, the "typical antbirds". It is found in Bolivia, Brazil, and Peru.

== Taxonomy and systematics ==
The bluish-slate antshrike has two subspecies, the nominate T. s. schistogynus (Hellmayr, 1911) and T. s. intermedius (Carriker, 1935). Some early twentieth century authors treated the bluish-slate antshrike and the cinereous antshrike (T. caesius) as conspecific. They now are considered a superspecies.

== Description ==
The bluish-slate antshrike is 13.5 to 14.5 cm (5.3 to 5.7 in) long and weighs 16 to 18 g (0.56 to 0.63 oz). Adult males of the nominate subspecies are almost entirely darkish gray; they have a hidden white patch between the scapulars. Adult females' upperparts and throat are a slightly browner and paler gray than the male's. Their ear coverts and throat have thin white streaks. Their belly and flanks are deep cinnamon-rufous. Subspecies T. s. intermedius is darker overall than the nominate.

== Distribution and habitat ==
The nominate subspecies of the bluish-slate antshrike has the larger range. It is found in western Brazil south of the Amazon and west of the lower Juruá River south to its upper reaches and the upper Purus River, in southeastern Peru south of the Department of Junín, and into northwestern Bolivia to Cochabamba Department. Subspecies T. s. intermedius is found in central Peru from south of the Amazon and east of the Huallaga River south to Junín. The species inhabits the understorey to mid-storey of terra firme and várzea evergreen forest, where it favors areas with much bamboo and vine tangles. In most areas it occurs below 800 m (2,600 ft) but reaches 1,200 m (3,900 ft).

== Behavior ==
=== Movement ===
The bluish-slate antshrike is believed to be a year-round resident throughout its range.

=== Feeding ===
The bluish-slate antshrike's diet includes insects and other arthropods. It mostly forages singly, in pairs, and family groups and usually as the central member of a mixed-species feeding flock. It typically forages between 3 and 8 m (10 and 30 ft) above the ground but also as low as 1.5 m (5 ft) and as high as 13 m (40 ft). It usually captures prey with a sally from a perch to capture it in mid-air or from foliage, stems, and vines.

=== Breeding ===
The bluish-slate antshrike nests between June and November in Peru; its season elsewhere has not been defined. Its nest is a deep cup made of rotten leaves, rootlets, and other plant fibers. It resembles a pile of dead leaves or debris. It is typically placed in a bush, sapling, or vine tangle. The clutch size is two eggs. Both sexes have been observed feeding nestlings. The incubation period, time to fledging, and other details of parental care are not known.

=== Vocalization ===
The bluish-slate antshrike's song is a "hurried series of a few very high, fluted notes, then accelerating to a rather long, downslurred rattle". Its calls include "a rattle, usually introduced by...a whine", "similar notes given in succession", a "downslurred note", and "a soft chatter".

== Status ==
The IUCN has assessed the bluish-slate antshrike as being of Least Concern. It has a large range. Its population size is not known and is believed to be decreasing. No immediate threats have been identified. It is considered fairly common to common across its range, "much of which remains little developed and relatively inaccessible", and which includes some large protected areas.
