= Andirá River (Juruá River tributary) =

- Location within Brazil
- Native name: Rio Andirá (Portuguese)

Location
- Country: Brazil

Physical characteristics
- Source
  - location: Amazonas
- Mouth
  - location: Juruá, Amazonas
  - coordinates: 3.664284°S 66.125393°W

Basin features
- River system: Juruá River

The Andirá River (Portuguese: Rio Andirá) is a river of Amazonas, Brazil. It is a tributary of the Juruá River.

The river forms the western boundary of the Tefé National Forest, created in 1989. It forms the southwest boundary of the 187,982 hectares (464,510 acres) Baixo Juruá Extractive Reserve, created in 2001.

== See also ==
- List of rivers of Amazonas (Brazilian state)
