= Tefé National Forest =

- Floresta Nacional de Tefé
- IUCN category VI (protected area with sustainable use of natural resources)
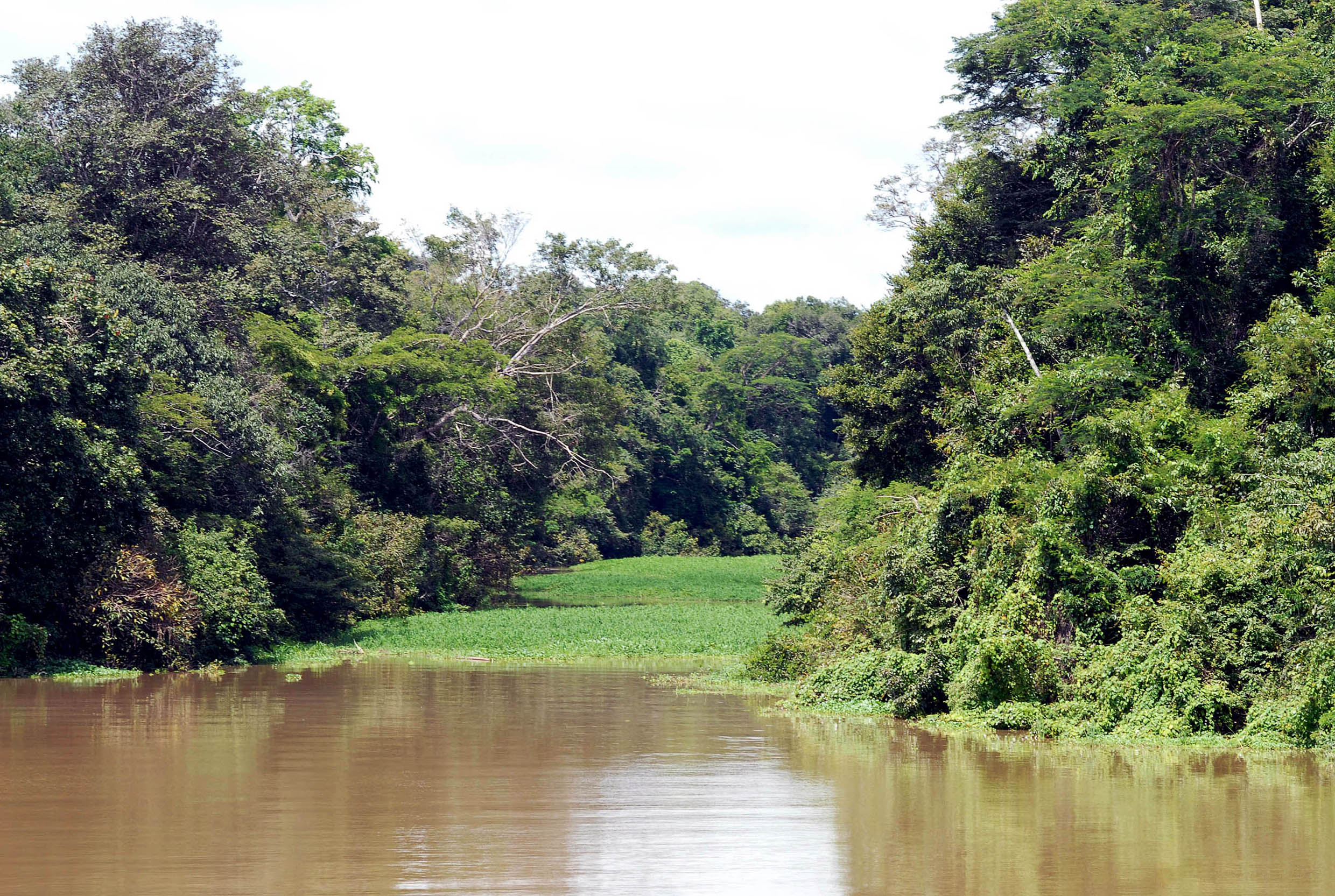
- Tefé River

- Location within Brazil
- Nearest city: Tefé, Amazonas
- Coordinates: 4°09′56″S 65°37′14″W
- Area: 865,126.62 hectares (2,137,774.4 acres)
- Designation: National forest
- Created: 10 April 1989
- Administrator: ICMBio

The Tefé National Forest (Portuguese: Floresta Nacional de Tefé) is a national forest in Amazonas, Brazil. It protects a relatively well-preserved area of Amazon rainforest to the south of the town of Tefé on the Solimões River (upper Amazon River). The resident population, scattered in small communities along the rivers, are engaged in sustainable farming, fishing and extraction of forest products.

== Location ==
The Tefé National Forest is divided between the municipalities of Tefé (46.27%}, Juruá (11.89%), Carauari (4.96%) and Alvarães (36.88%) in Amazonas. It has an area of 865,126.62 hectares (2,137,774.4 acres).

The forest is bounded by the Tefé River to the east, the Bauana River, a tributary of the Tefé, to the north, the Andirá River, a tributary of the Juruá River, to the west, and the Curumitá de Baixo River, a tributary of the Tefé, to the south. The Curimatá de Baixo runs through the reserve from southwest to northeast. The Baixo Juruá Extractive Reserve adjoins the extreme northwest of the forest.

== History ==
The Tefé National Forest was created by federal decree 97.629 of 10 April 1989 with an estimated area of 1,020,000 hectares (2,500,000 acres). It is classed as IUCN protected area category VI (protected area with sustainable use of natural resources). The purpose is to support sustainable multiple use of forest resources, and scientific research with emphasis on methods for sustainable exploitation of native forests. The forest is administered by the Chico Mendes Institute for Biodiversity Conservation.

The forest became part of the Central Amazon Ecological Corridor, established in 2002. The consultative council was created on 24 February 2011. The profile of the beneficiary families was approved on 7 October 2015 and the management plan was approved on 23 February 2016.

== Population ==
As of 2003 there was a low level of deforestation, largely due to the isolation of the forest from urban centers. As of 2006 there were 359 families with an estimated total of 2,154 people in the forest, living in 30 communities along the three main rivers. There were 124 families in 11 communities along the Tefé, 74 families in 8 communities along the Bauana and 171 families in 11 communities along the Curumitá de Baixo. The residents are mainly engaged in family farming, cultivating small fields of cassava to make flour. The surplus is marketed in the city of Tefé either directly or through middlemen. Other activities include artisan fishing and extraction of nuts, açaí, andiroba, copaiba and wood.

== Sources ==
- CEC Central da Amazônia (in Portuguese), ISA: Instituto Socioambiental
- Flona de Tefé (in Portuguese), ICMBio: Chico Mendes Institute for Biodiversity Conservation, archived from the original on 2019-07-10
- FLONA de Tefé (in Portuguese), ISA: Instituto Socioambiental
- Mateus Gleiser Oliveira (2016), Mapeamento participativo com comunidades ribeirinhas: Flona de Tefé - Amazonas (PDF), UFRGS
- Unidade de Conservação: Floresta Nacional de Tefé (in Portuguese), MMA: Ministério do Meio Ambiente
