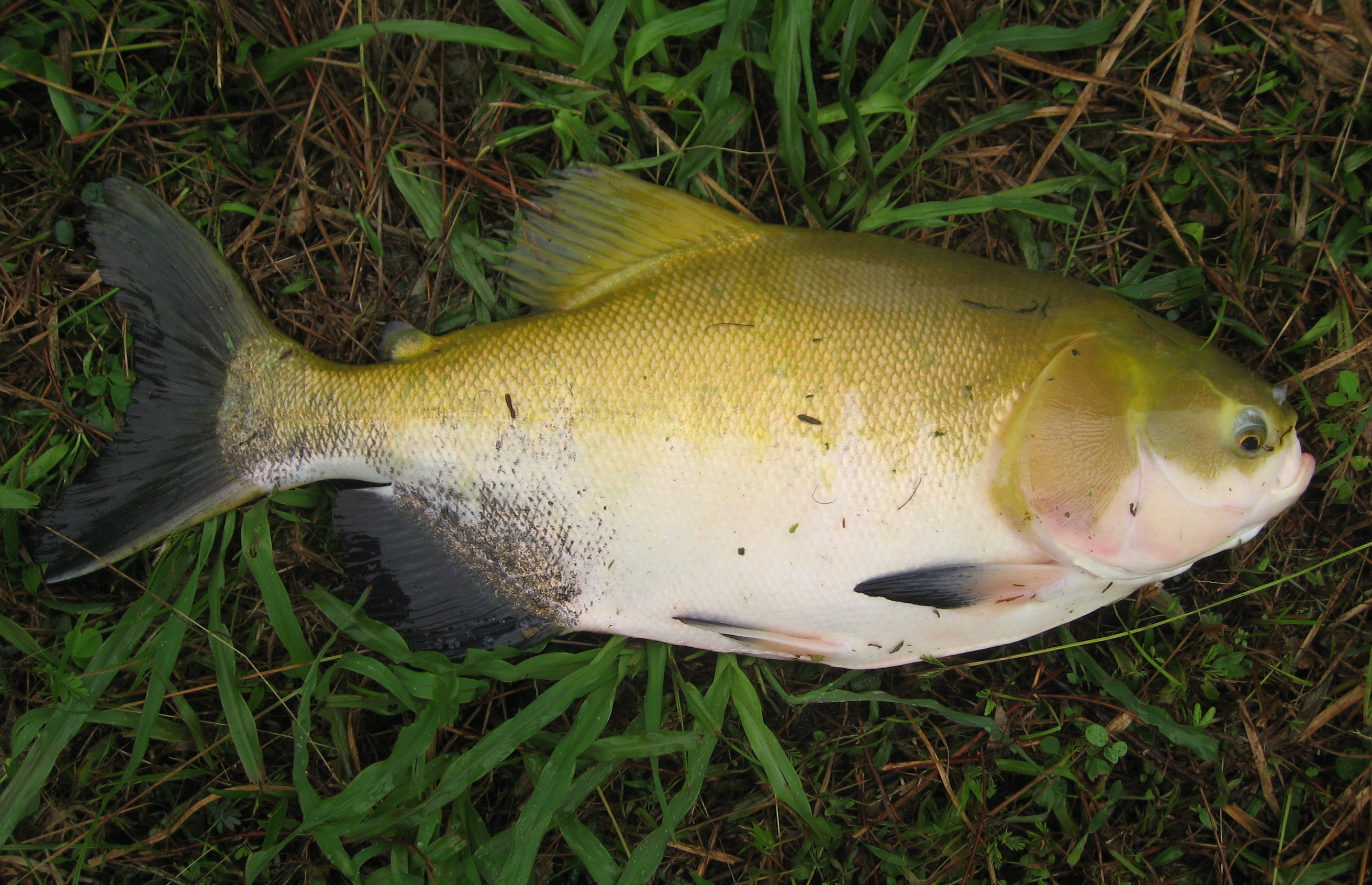

Conservation status
- Near Threatened (IUCN 3.1)

Scientific classification
- Kingdom: Animalia
- Phylum: Chordata
- Class: Actinopterygii
- Division: Teleostei
- Order: Characiformes
- Family: Serrasalmidae
- Subfamily: Colossomatinae
- Genus: Colossoma; C. H. Eigenmann & C. H. Kennedy, 1903
- Species: C. macropomum

Binomial name
- Colossoma macropomum (G. Cuvier, 1818)

Synonyms
- Myletes macropomus Cuvier, 1816; Myletes oculus Cope, 1872; Myletes nigripinnis Cope, 1878; Melloina tambaqui Amaral Campos, 1946

= Tambaqui =

Tambaqui Temporal range: Middle Miocene to present

Species of fishes

The tambaqui (Colossoma macropomum) is a large species of freshwater fish in the family Serrasalmidae. It is native to tropical South America, but kept in aquaculture and introduced elsewhere. It is also known by the names black pacu, black-finned pacu, giant pacu, cachama, gamitana, and sometimes as pacu (a name used for several other related species).

The tambaqui is currently the only member of Colossoma, but the Piaractus species were also included in this genus in the past.

== Distribution ==
The tambaqui is native to freshwater habitats in the Amazon and Orinoco basins of tropical South America. In nutrient-rich whitewater rivers such as the Madeira, Juruá, Putumayo (Içá) and Purus it ranges throughout, all the way up to their headwaters. In nutrient-poor blackwater rivers such as the Rio Negro and clearwater rivers such as several rightbank tributaries of the Madeira it generally only occurs in the lower c. 300 km (200 mi) and is rare beyond the lowermost c. 150 km (100 mi). It is widely kept in aquaculture outside its native range in South America.

Middle Miocene-aged fossils of C. macropomum are known from northern Colombia and the Peruvian Amazon. Their occurrence in Colombia suggests that prior to further uplift of the Andes, they also inhabited western South America. Their fossil range includes the modern Magdalena River basin, but modern occurrence in this river is due to introductions by humans.

== Description ==
The tambaqui is the heaviest characin in the Americas (the lighter Salminus can grow longer) and the second heaviest scaled freshwater fish in South America (after the arapaima). It can reach up to 1.1 m (3.6 ft) in total length and 44 kg (97 lb 0 oz) in weight, but a more typical size is 0.7 m (2.3 ft). The largest caught by rod-and-reel and recognized by IGFA weighed 32.4 kg (71 lb 7 oz), although other systems have a 37 kg (81 lb 9 oz) fish caught in Peru in 2013. After the flood season, around 10% of a tambaqui's weight is the visceral fat reserves and at least another 5% is fat found in the head and muscles.

It is similar in shape to the piranha and juveniles are sometimes confused with the carnivorous fish; the tambaqui is tall and laterally compressed with large eyes and a slightly arched back. Unlike more predatory species, the teeth of the tambaqui are molar-like, an adaption for crushing plant seeds and nuts. The lower half of its body is typically mainly blackish. The remaining is mainly gray, yellowish or olive, but the exact hue varies considerably and depends in part on habitat with individuals in blackwater being much darker than individuals from whitewater. The pelvic, anal and small pectoral fins are black. The tambaqui resembles the red-bellied pacu (Piaractus brachypomus), but the latter species has a more rounded head profile (less elongated and pointed) and a smaller adipose fin that lacks rays, as well as differences in teeth and operculum.

Hybrids between the tambaqui and the similar Piaractus (both species) have been produced in aquaculture, and are occasionally seen in the wild. The hybrid offspring can be difficult to identify by appearance alone.

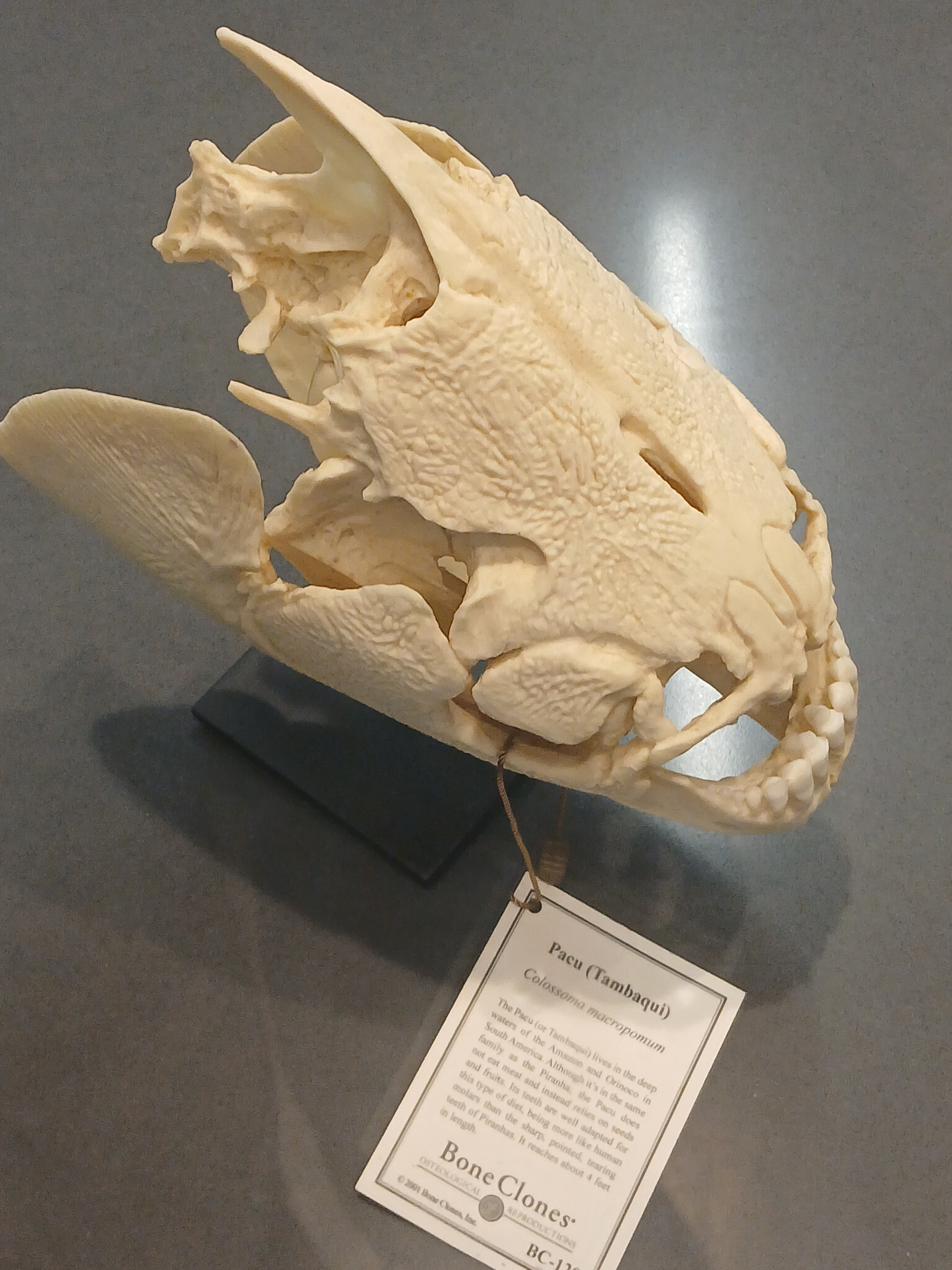
Skull replica at the San Diego Zoo

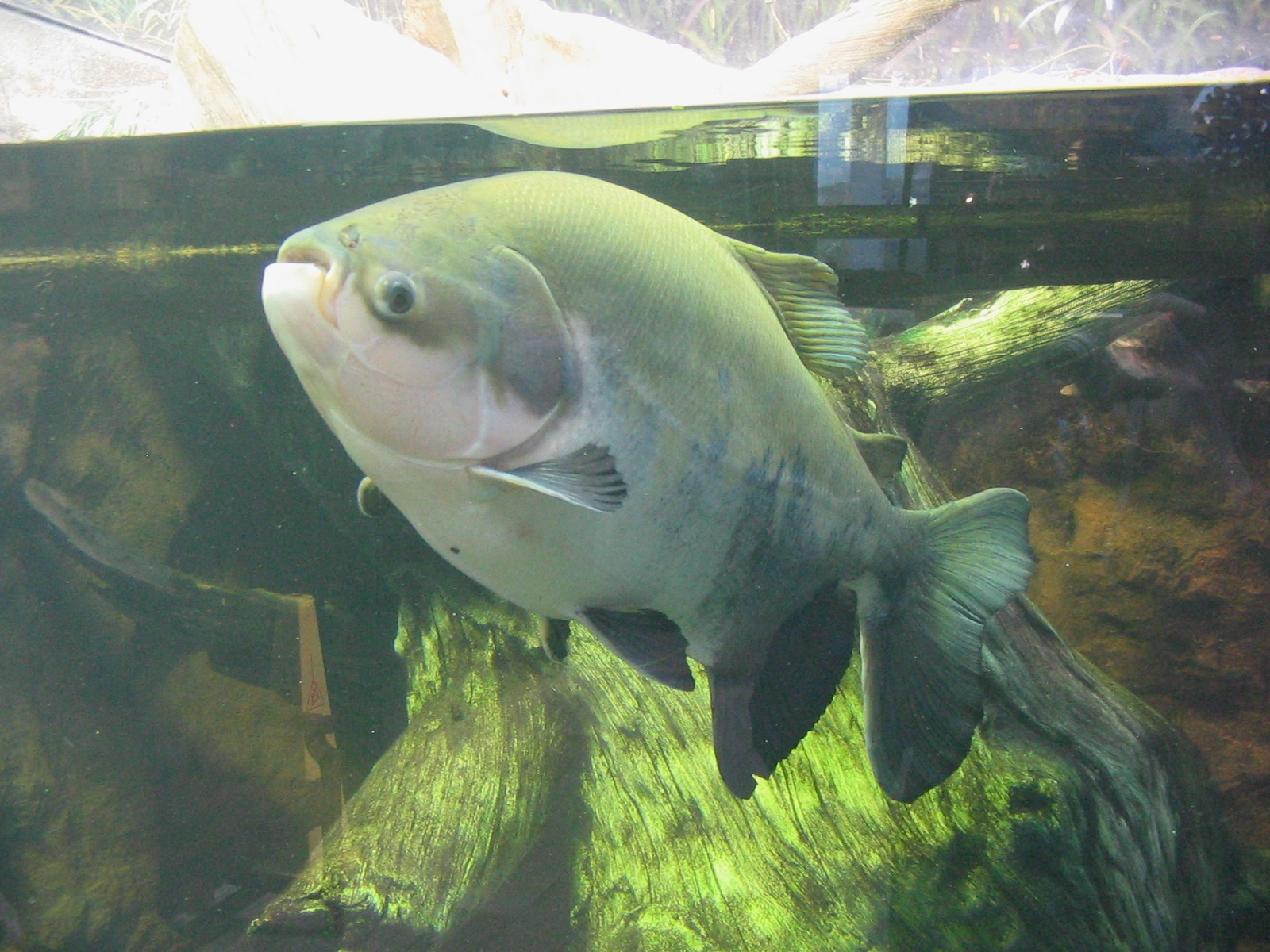
At the Shedd Aquarium

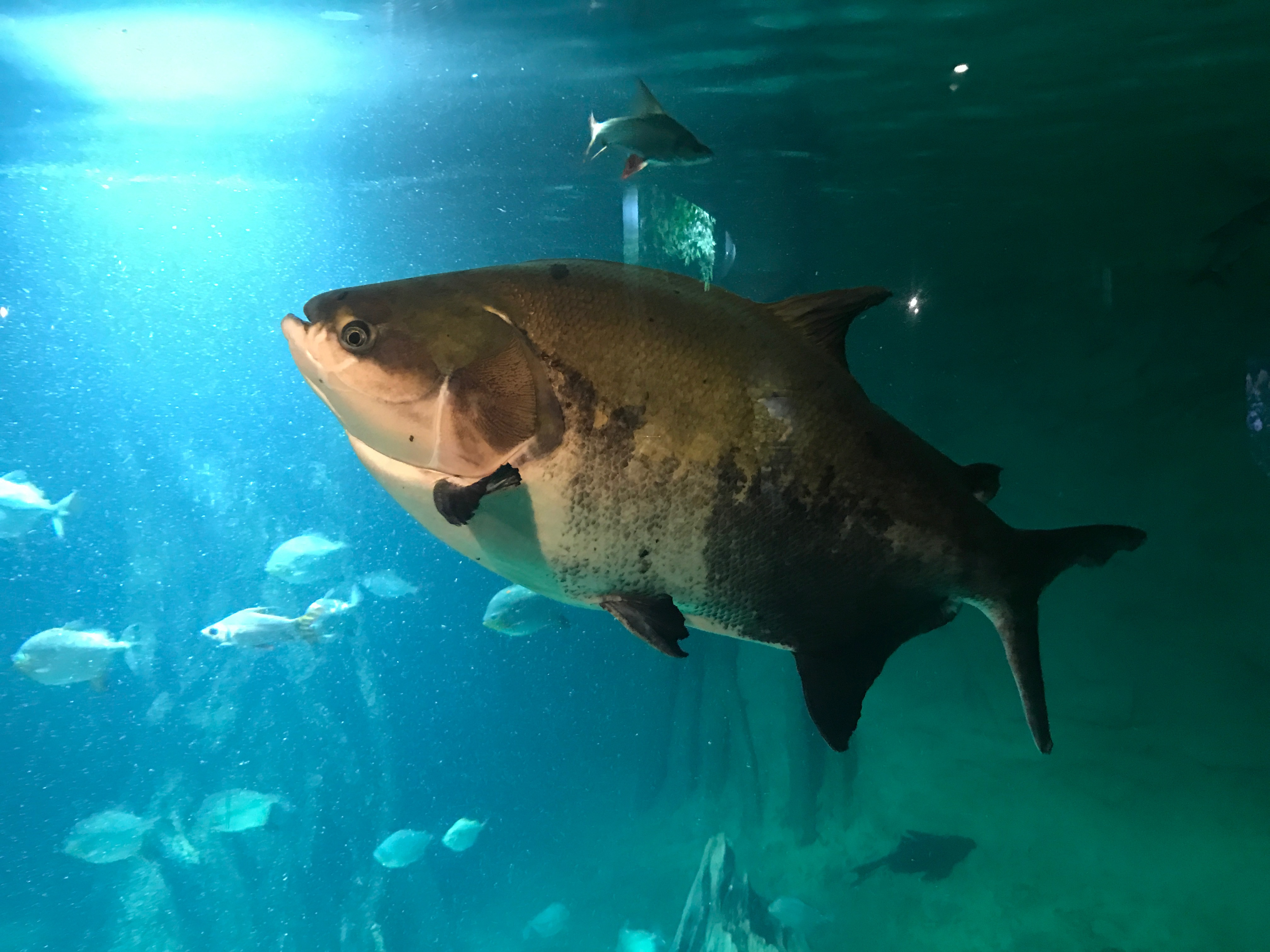
At the Vancouver Aquarium

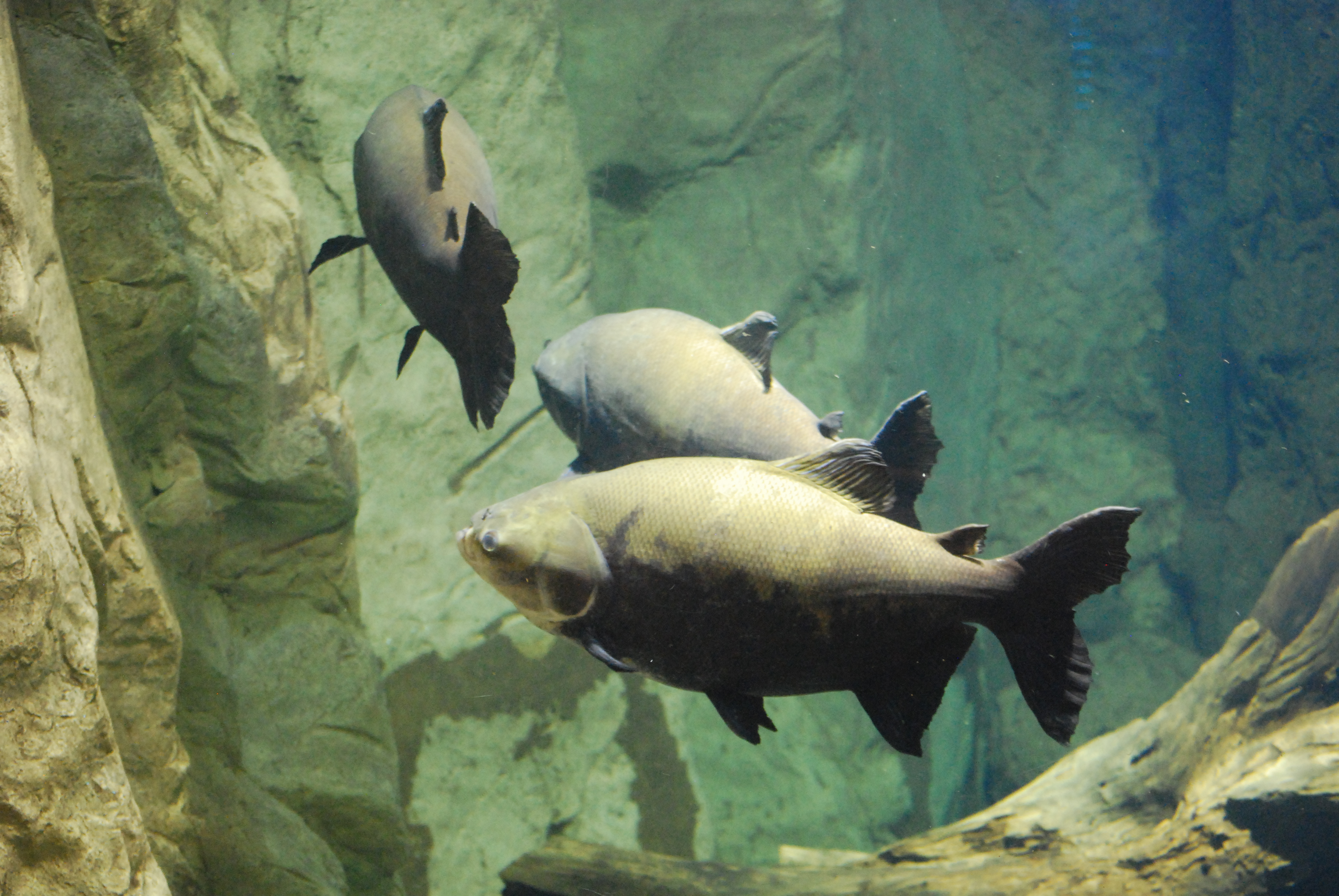
At the Aquarium of Veracruz

== Ecology ==
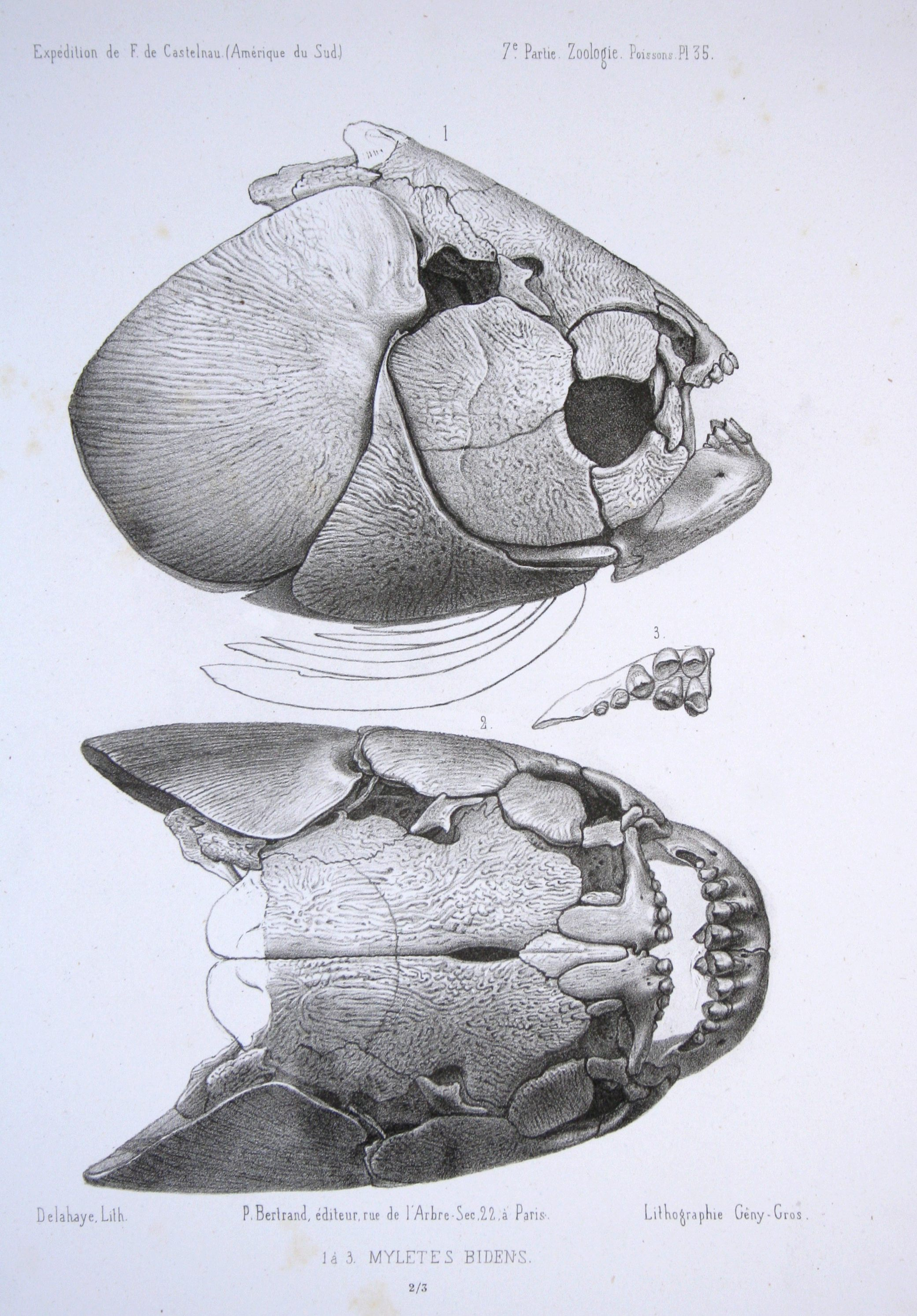
Skull

=== Habitat, breeding and migration ===
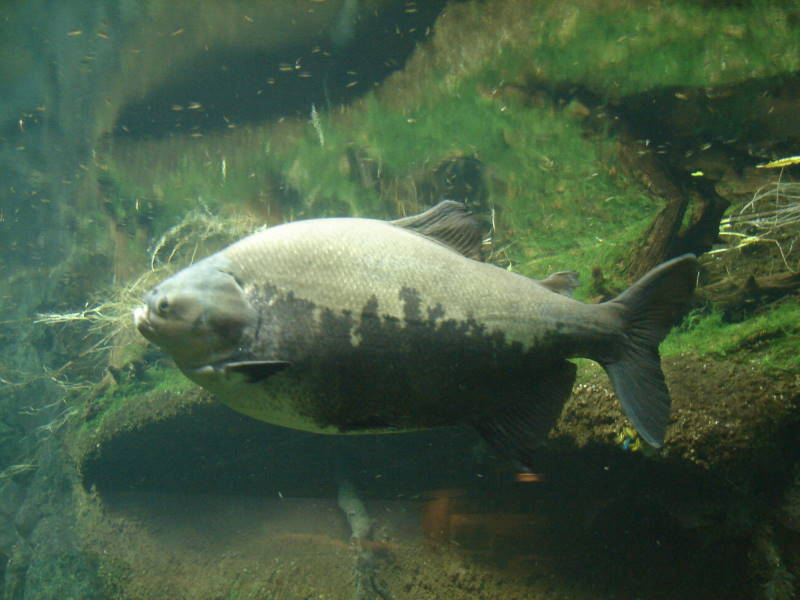
At the National Zoological Park

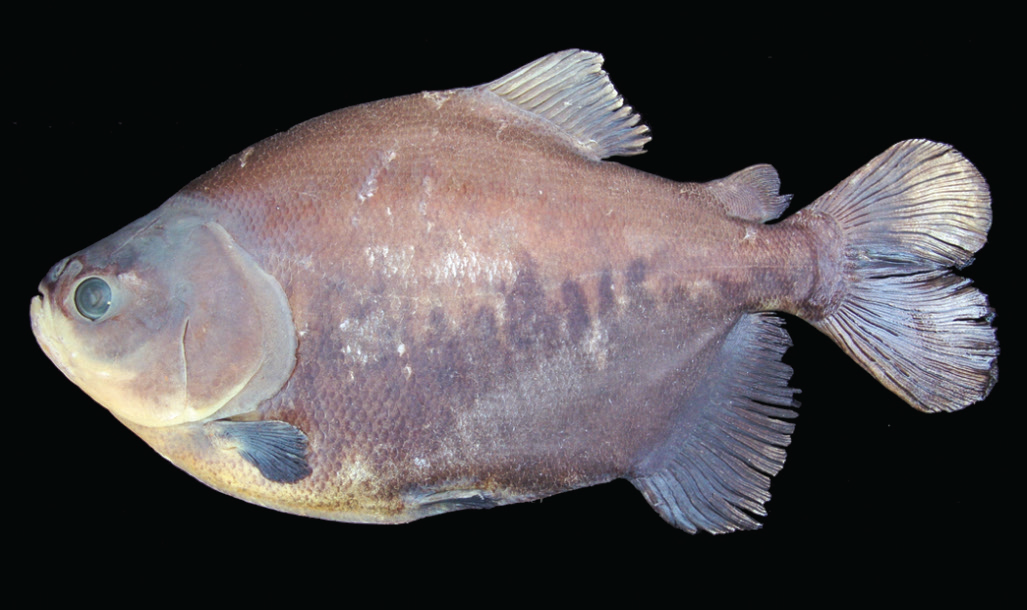
Preserved specimen

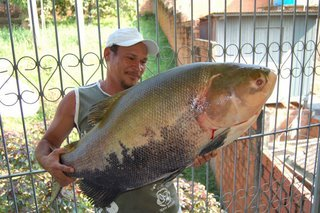
Showing size

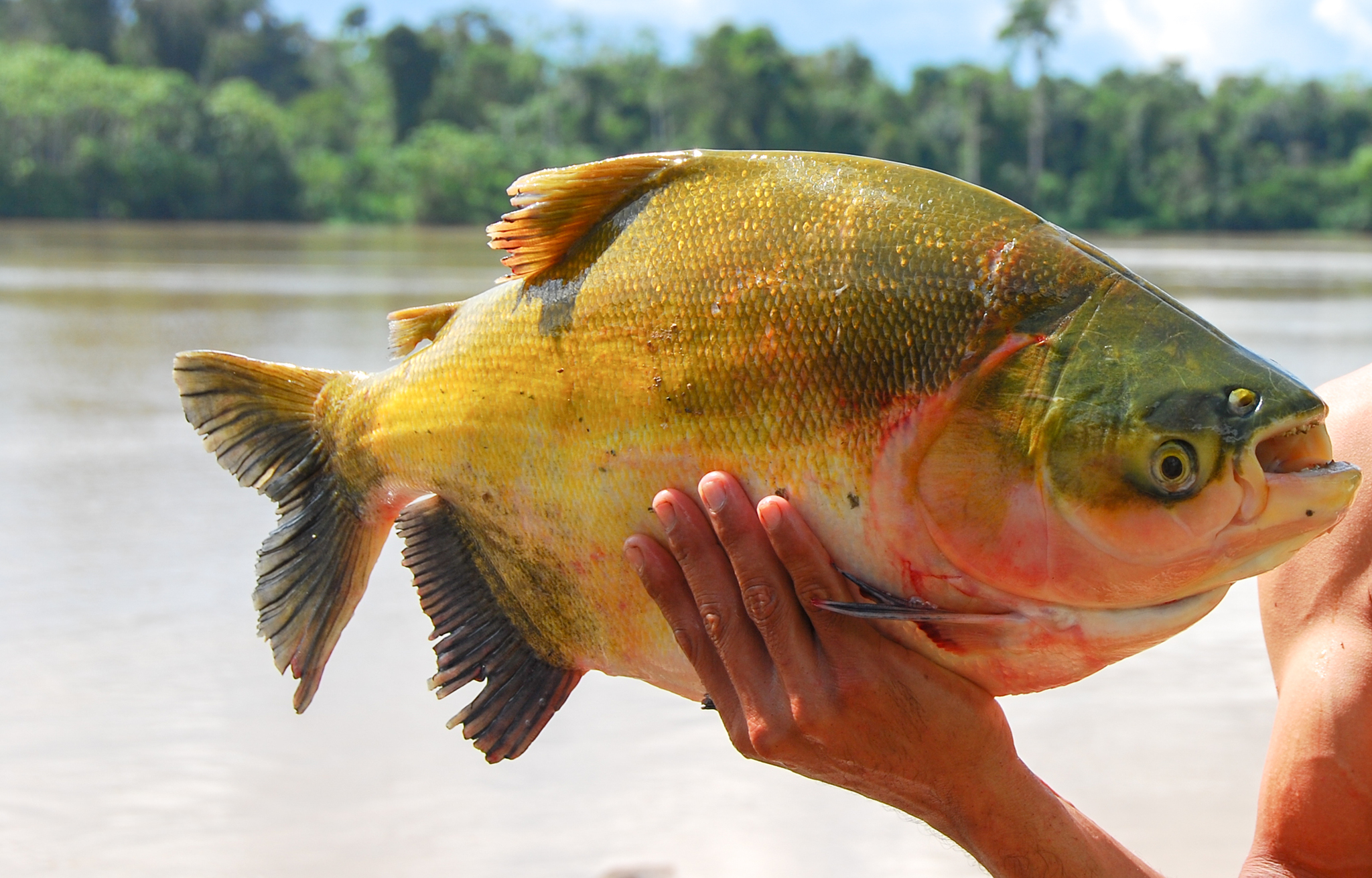
In Carauari, Amazonas

This species is mostly solitary, but it migrates in large schools. During the non-breeding season, adults stay in flooded forests of white (várzea), clear and blackwater (igapó) rivers. They stay there for four to seven months during the flood season, but as the water level drops they move into the main river channels or to a lesser extent floodplain lakes. At the start of the next flood season, large schools move into whitewater rivers where they spawn between November and February. The exact spawning location in the whitewater rivers is not entirely certain, but apparently along woody shores or grassy levees. The schools then break up as the adults return to the flooded forest of white, clear and blackwater rivers, and the annual pattern is repeated. Larvae are found in whitewater rivers, including the Amazon River itself. Juveniles stay near macrophytes in floodplains and flooded forests year-round, only switching to the adult migration pattern when reaching sexual maturity. Maturity is reached at a length of about 60 cm (2 ft).

The species regularly reaches an age of 40 years and may reach up to 65.

=== Oxygen, salt and pH resistance ===
When there is not enough oxygen in the river or lake, tambaqui obtain oxygen from the air. They are able to do this by their physical and inner body parts, such as their gills and swim bladder vascularization.

Tambaqui is a fish that lives in freshwater. Juveniles can survive in brackish water when the salinity is gradually raised. Salinity levels above 20 g/L result in death. When juveniles are reared in salinities above 10 g/L, there is a significant detrimental effect on growth, haematological parameters and osmoregulation.

In an experiment, tambaqui had the pH of their water changed. No deaths occurred to tambaqui if the pH did not fall to 3.0. The only internal difference that was noted in tambaqui when the pH was being altered was a change in the acid-base of the plasma and red cells.

In another experiment, tambaquis were exposed to pH drops from 6.0 to 4.0, similar to what they would encounter in their natural habitat. Researchers found that the microbial communities of the tambaqui fish gut were very resilient to the pH drops, which could explain part of the ability of tambaquis to migrate between black and white water streams in the Amazon.

=== Diet ===
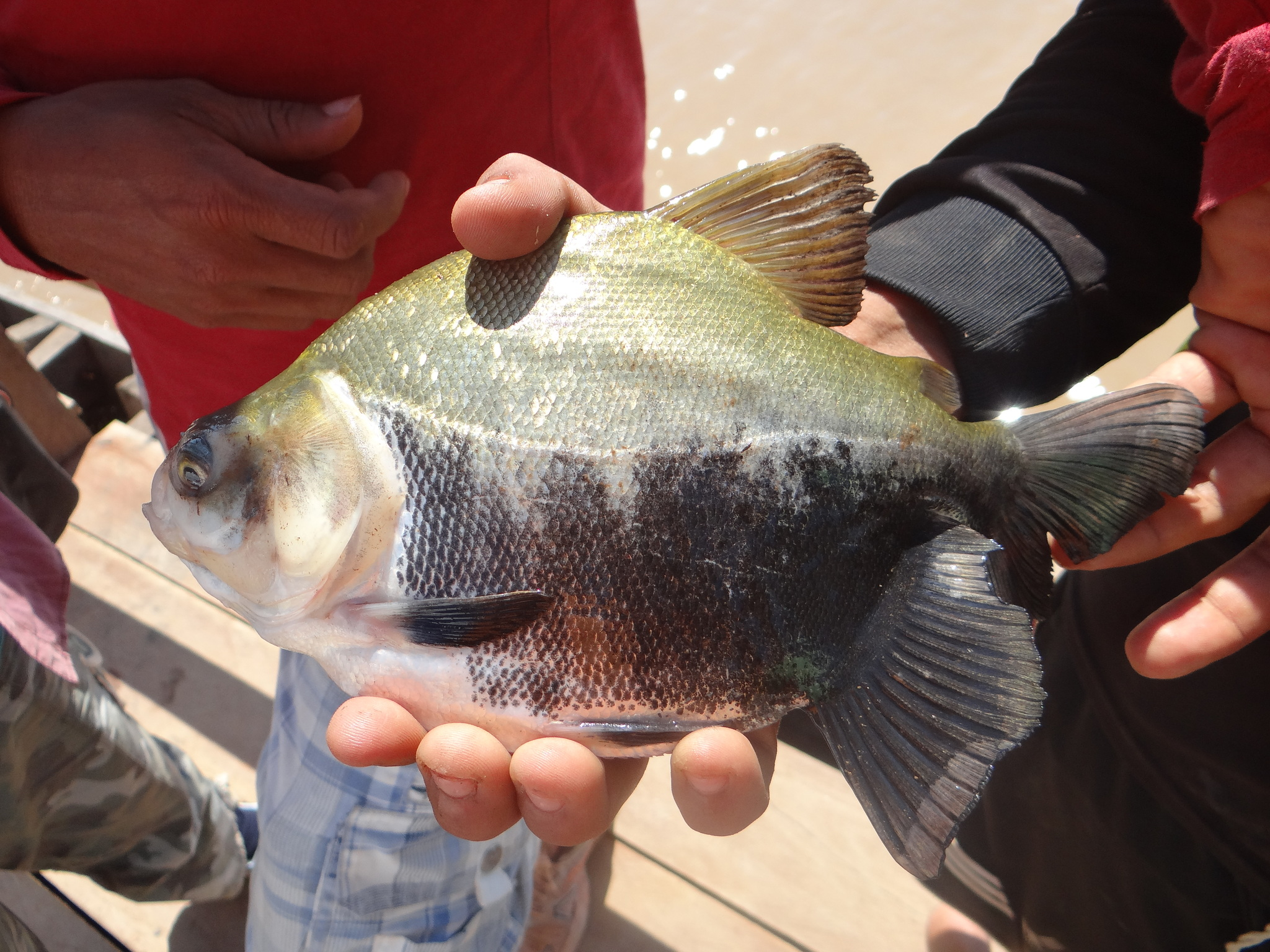
Juvenile, in Bolivia

Tambaqui consume fruits and seeds, especially from woody angiosperms and herbaceous species. Depending on the quantity and food quality of these foods, it causes the fish to decide on their location of their habitat. In one study during the high-water season, 78—98 percent of the diet consisted of fruits. Another study of the stomach content of 138 specimens during the high-water season found that 44% of the weight was fruits and seeds, 30% was zooplankton and 22% was wild rice. Among 125 specimens during the low-water season, a higher percentage had empty stomachs (14%, about ten times more than in the high-water season) and about 70% of the total stomach content weight was zooplankton. In addition to seeds, fruits, wild rice and zooplankton, smaller levels of insects, snails, shrimps, small fish, filamentous algae and decaying plants are consumed.

==== Seed dispersal ====
The tambaqui plays an important role in dispersing plant seeds. The fruit seeds that fall in the water are consumed by tambaqui and the seed is dispersed somewhere else; this is similar to what birds do. This consumption includes about 35% of the trees and lianas during flood season and these seeds can grow after the floodwater calms down. Compared to the younger and smaller tambaqui, larger and older tambaqui are able to disperse the seeds in a faster rate. The gut of a well-fed 10 kg (22 lb) tambaqui can contain more than 1 kg (2.2 lb) seeds. In general, more seeds are able to pass undamaged through the red-bellied pacu (Piaractus brachypomus) than the tambaqui, meaning that the former overall is a more efficient seed disperser.

== Relationship with humans ==
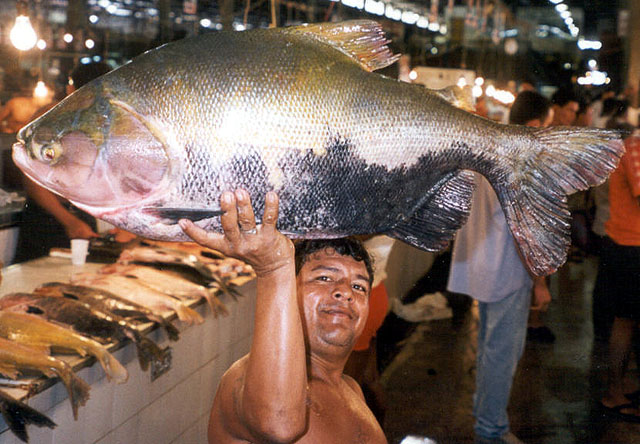
A tambaqui for sale in the Manaus Fish Market, Brazil. This fish was approximately 85 cm (33 1/2 in) long.

The meat of the tambaqui is popular and fetches top prices in fish markets in its native range. It is marketed fresh and frozen.

Wild populations of the tambaqui have declined because of overfishing and many currently caught fish are juveniles. In Manaus alone, the landings fell from c. 15,000 metric tons (14,800 long tons) per year in the 1970s to 800 metric tons (790 long tons) in 1996. Based on a review by IBAMA, it was the 11th most caught fish by weight in the Brazilian Amazon in 1998 (just ahead of the closely related pirapitinga, Piaractus brachypomus).

The tambaqui is now widely kept in aquaculture. It can live in oxygen-poor waters and is very resistant to diseases. In Brazil, tambaqui is one of the main farmed fish species, and therefore important to the country's economy. Studies of farmed tambaqui in Brazil have revealed a genetic diversity similar to that seen among wild populations. In fish farms this species is sometimes hybridized with Piaractus to produce offspring that accept a wider temperature range (colder water) than pure tambaqui.

In Thailand, this fish, known locally as pla khu dam (ปลาคู้ดำ), was introduced from Hong Kong and Singapore as part of fish-farming projects, but has adapted to local conditions and thrives in the wild in some areas. There is also an introduced population in Puerto Rico and singles (likely deliberate releases by aquarists) have been caught in a wide range of U.S. states, but only those in the warmest regions can survive.

Juveniles 5–7.5 cm (2–3 in) long, sometimes labelled as "vegetarian piranha", are frequently seen in the aquarium trade, but they rapidly grow to a large size and require an enormous tank.
