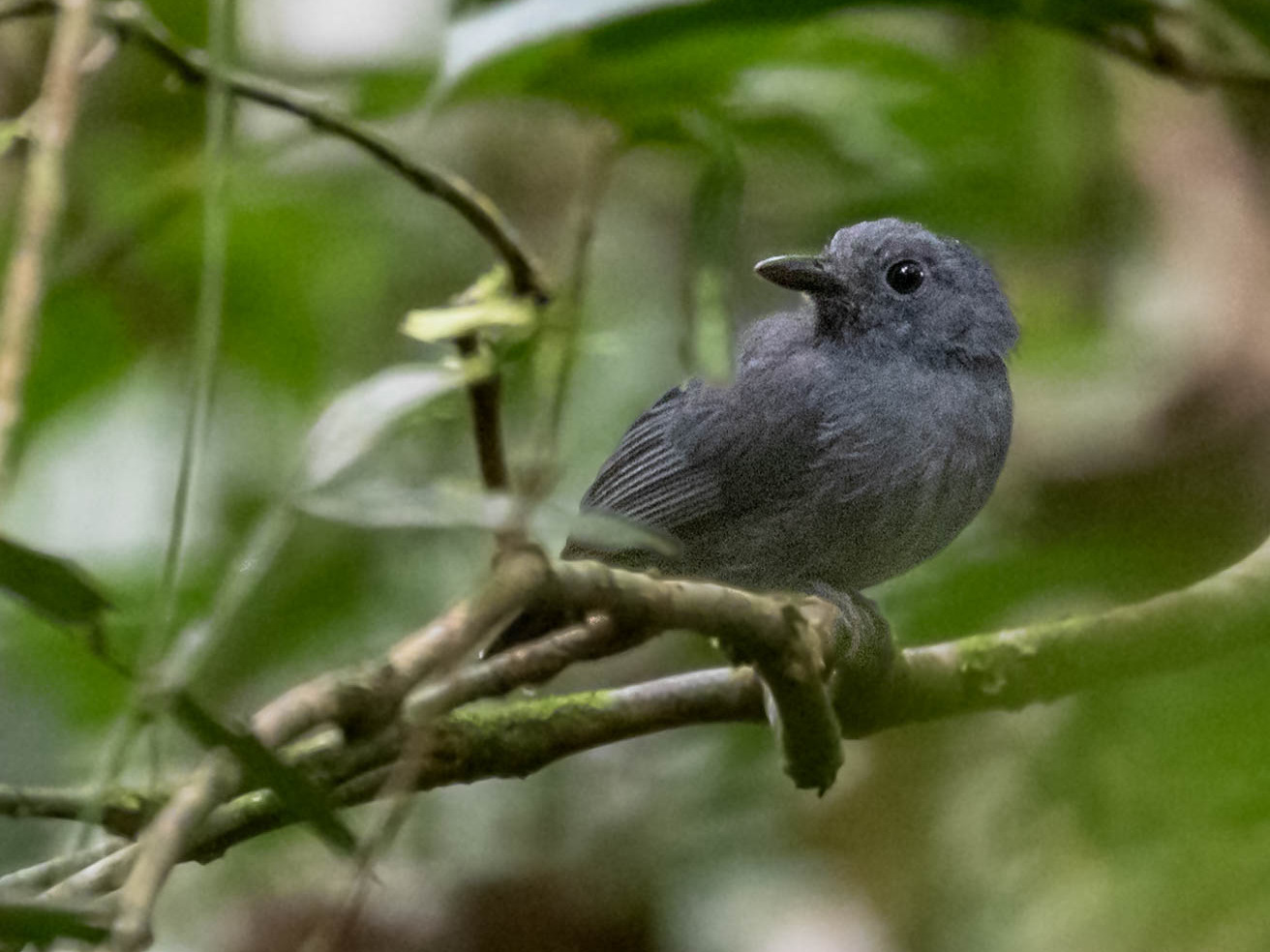
- Male at Rio Branco, Acre, Brazil.
- Audio recording made in Ecuador

Conservation status
- Least Concern (IUCN 3.1)

Scientific classification
- Kingdom: Animalia
- Phylum: Chordata
- Class: Aves
- Order: Passeriformes
- Family: Thamnophilidae
- Genus: Thamnomanes
- Species: T. ardesiacus

Binomial name
- Thamnomanes ardesiacus (Sclater, PL & Salvin, 1868)

Synonyms
- Dysithamnus ardesiacus

= Dusky-throated antshrike =

Species of bird

The dusky-throated antshrike (Thamnomanes ardesiacus) is a species of bird in subfamily Thamnophilinae of family Thamnophilidae, the "typical antbirds". It is found in Bolivia, Brazil, Colombia, Ecuador, French Guiana, Guyana, Peru, Suriname, and Venezuela.

== Taxonomy and systematics ==
The dusky-throated antshrike was described by the English ornithologists Philip Sclater and Osbert Salvin in 1868 and given the binomial name Dysithamnus ardesiacus. Its current genus Thamnomanes was introduced by the German ornithologist Jean Cabanis in 1847. The name combines the Ancient Greek words thamnos "bush" and -manēs "fond of". The species was moved to Thamnomanes by the early 21st century.

The dusky-throated and saturnine antshrike (T. saturminus) were treated as conspecific by many twentieth century authors and now are considered to form a superspecies.

The dusky-throated antshrike has two subspecies, the nominate T. a. ardesiacus (Sclater, PL & Salvin, 1868) and T. a. obidensis (Snethlage, E, 1914).

== Description ==
The dusky-throated antshrike is 13 to 14 cm (5.1 to 5.5 in) long and weighs 16 to 19 g (0.56 to 0.67 oz). Adult males of the nominate subspecies are mostly darkish gray that is lighter on their belly. They sometimes have a small white patch between their scapulars and often some black feathers on their throat. Their wings and tail are darkish gray with small white tips on the tail feathers. Adult females have dark olive-brown upperparts with more rufous wings and tail. Their throat is buff-white and the rest of their underparts pale buffy ochraceous. Subspecies T. a. obidensis has a shorter tail than the nominate, a black throat, and sometimes some white on the wings.

== Distribution and habitat ==
The nominate subspecies of the dusky-throated antshrike is found east of the Andes from south-central and southeastern Colombia south through eastern Ecuador into eastern Peru and northeastern Bolivia and in far western Brazil's Acre state. Subspecies T. a. obidensis is found from eastern Colombia east through eastern and southern Venezuela and the Guianas, and in northern Brazil from the Rio Negro watershed to the Atlantic and south of the Amazon between the rios Tefé and Purus. The species primarily inhabits the understorey of terra firme evergreen forest and occurs less often in várzea forest. In elevation it reaches 1,050 m (3,400 ft) though only as high as 400 m (1,300 ft) in Colombia and is mostly below 500 m (1,600 ft) in Ecuador.

== Behavior ==
=== Movement ===
The dusky-throated antshrike is believed to be a year-round resident throughout its range.

=== Feeding ===
The dusky-throated antshrike's diet includes insects and other arthropods. It mostly forages singly, in pairs, and family groups and usually as part of a mixed-species feeding flock. It typically forages from the ground up to about 4 m (13 ft) above it but will feed as high as 10 m (33 ft). It usually captures prey with a sally from a perch to the underside of foliage, and sometimes from the foliage's top side, stems, or trunks. It also gleans while perched and drops to the ground to take prey there. It regularly attends army ant swarms.

=== Breeding ===
The dusky-throated antshrike's breeding season has not been defined but includes at least June to October. Its nest is a cup made of fungal filaments and other plant fibers with dried leaves on the outside. It is placed in a branch fork up to about 2 m (7 ft) above the ground. The clutch size is two eggs; the incubation period is 11 to 12 days. The time to fledging and details of parental care are not known.

=== Vocalization ===
The dusky-throated antshrike's song is "a moderately long series of notes...that gradually become shorter, more intense, and rise in pitch before dropping into final raspy note". It has been written as "grr, grr, grr-grr-gee-gee-gee-geegeegeegigigi greeeyr". Its calls include a short "chirr", a "downslurred raspy note" and a "more abrupt, clearer note". Another call is "a sneezing 'tchif!' ".

== Status ==
The IUCN has assessed the dusky-throated antshrike as being of Least Concern. It has a very large range. Its population size is not known and is believed to be decreasing. No immediate threats have been identified. It is considered fairly common across its range, which includes many large protected areas.
