= Curumitá de Baixo River =

Curumitá de Baixo
- Location within Brazil
- Native name: Rio Curumitá de Baixo (Portuguese)

Location
- Country: Brazil

Physical characteristics
- Source
  - location: Amazonas
- Mouth
  - location: Tefé River
  - coordinates: 3.788670°S 65.023776°W

Basin features
- River system: Tefé River

The Curumitá de Baixo River (Portuguese: Rio Curumitá de Baixo) is a river of Amazonas, Brazil. It is a tributary of the Tefé River.

The river forms the southern boundary of the Tefé National Forest, created in 1989.

== See also ==
- List of rivers of Amazonas (Brazilian state)
