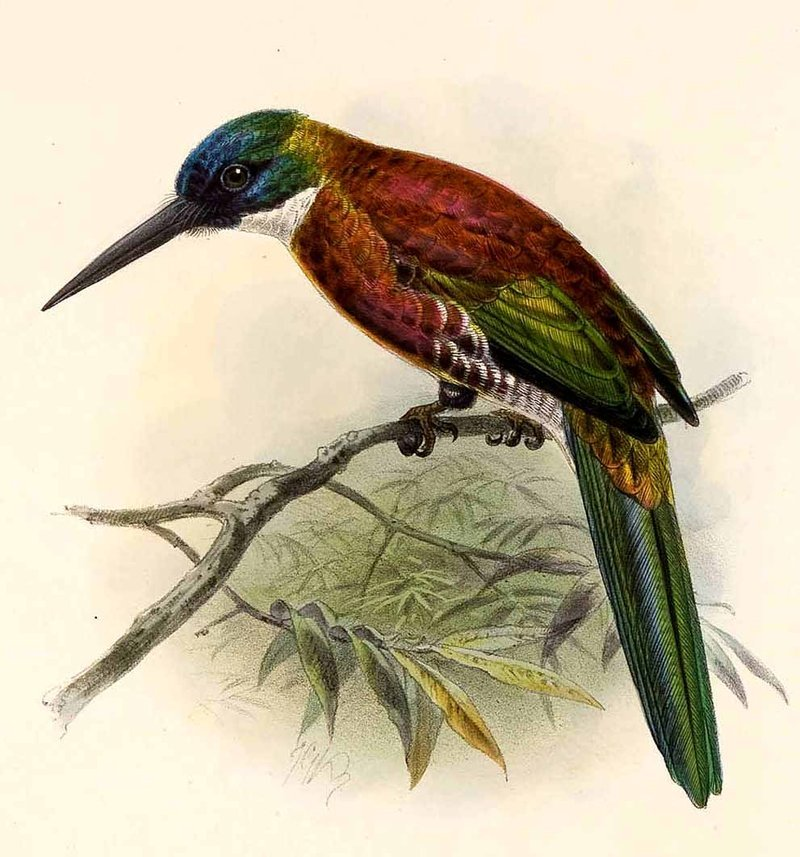

Conservation status
- Least Concern (IUCN 3.1)

Scientific classification
- Kingdom: Animalia
- Phylum: Chordata
- Class: Aves
- Order: Piciformes
- Family: Galbulidae
- Genus: Galbula
- Species: G. chalcothorax

Binomial name
- Galbula chalcothorax Sclater, PL, 1855

= Purplish jacamar =

Species of bird

The purplish jacamar (Galbula chalcothorax) is a species of bird in the family Galbulidae. It is found in Brazil, Colombia, Ecuador, and Peru.

== Taxonomy and systematics ==
The purplish jacamar is monotypic. It and bronzy jacamar (Galbula leucogastra) were formerly considered conspecific; they now form a superspecies.

== Description ==
The purplish jacamar is 20 to 23 cm (7.9 to 9.1 in) long and weighs 24.5 to 26.5 g (0.86 to 0.93 oz). The male's crown and face are blackish green and have a bluish sheen. The upper parts and breast vary from metallic reddish purple to a coppery red. It has a white throat and a belly that appears speckled black and white. The female differs by having yellow-brown or buff throat and belly.

== Distribution and habitat ==
The purplish jacamar is found in the western Amazon Basin from southeast Colombia's Putumayo and Amazonas Departments south through eastern Ecuador into eastern Peru and east into Brazil as far as the Juruá River in Amazonas state. It inhabits edges, openings, and the canopy in terra firme forest, both primary and secondary. It is also found in woodland on sandy soils and along watercourses. It primarily ranges in elevation up to 500 m (1,600 ft) but has been found as high as 1,000 m (3,300 ft) in Ecuador.

== Behavior ==
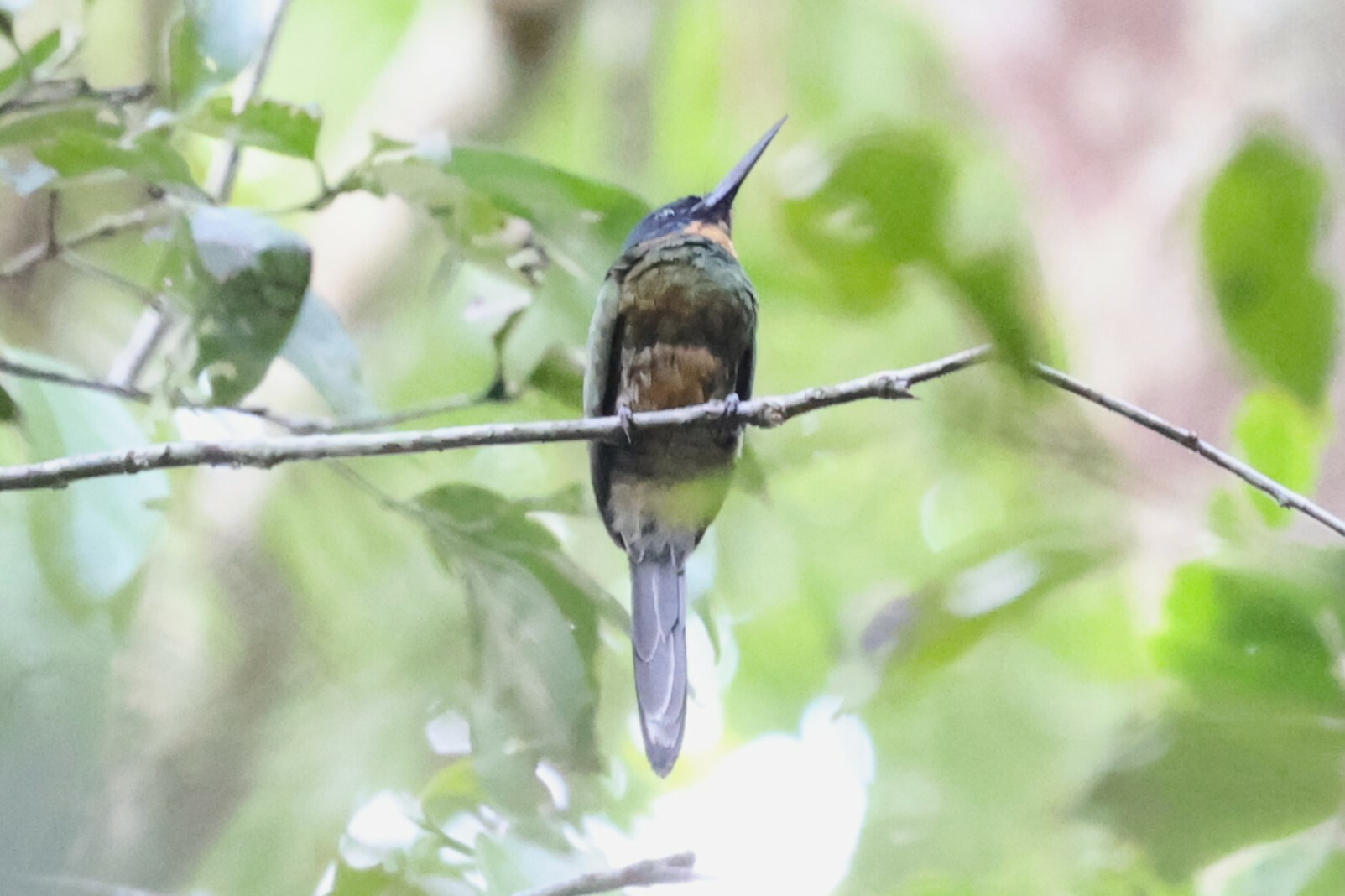
On branch

=== Feeding ===
The purplish jacamar's diet has not been documented, but is assumed to be a variety of flying insects. It perches by itself or in small groups, mostly in the shrub layer, and sallies out to catch its prey. It sometimes joins mixed-species foraging flocks.

=== Breeding ===
No information is available about the purplish jacamar's breeding phenology.

=== Vocalization ===
The purplish jacamar's song is similar to that of other jacamars, a rising series "weeee weeee wi-deee wi-deee wi-deee wi-deee" that sometimes ends with a trill . Its call is "weeee" .

== Status ==
The IUCN has assessed the purplish jacamar as being of Least Concern. However, it is not well known and appears to be generally uncommon. "It is probably threatened to some extent by forest degradation and habitat loss."
