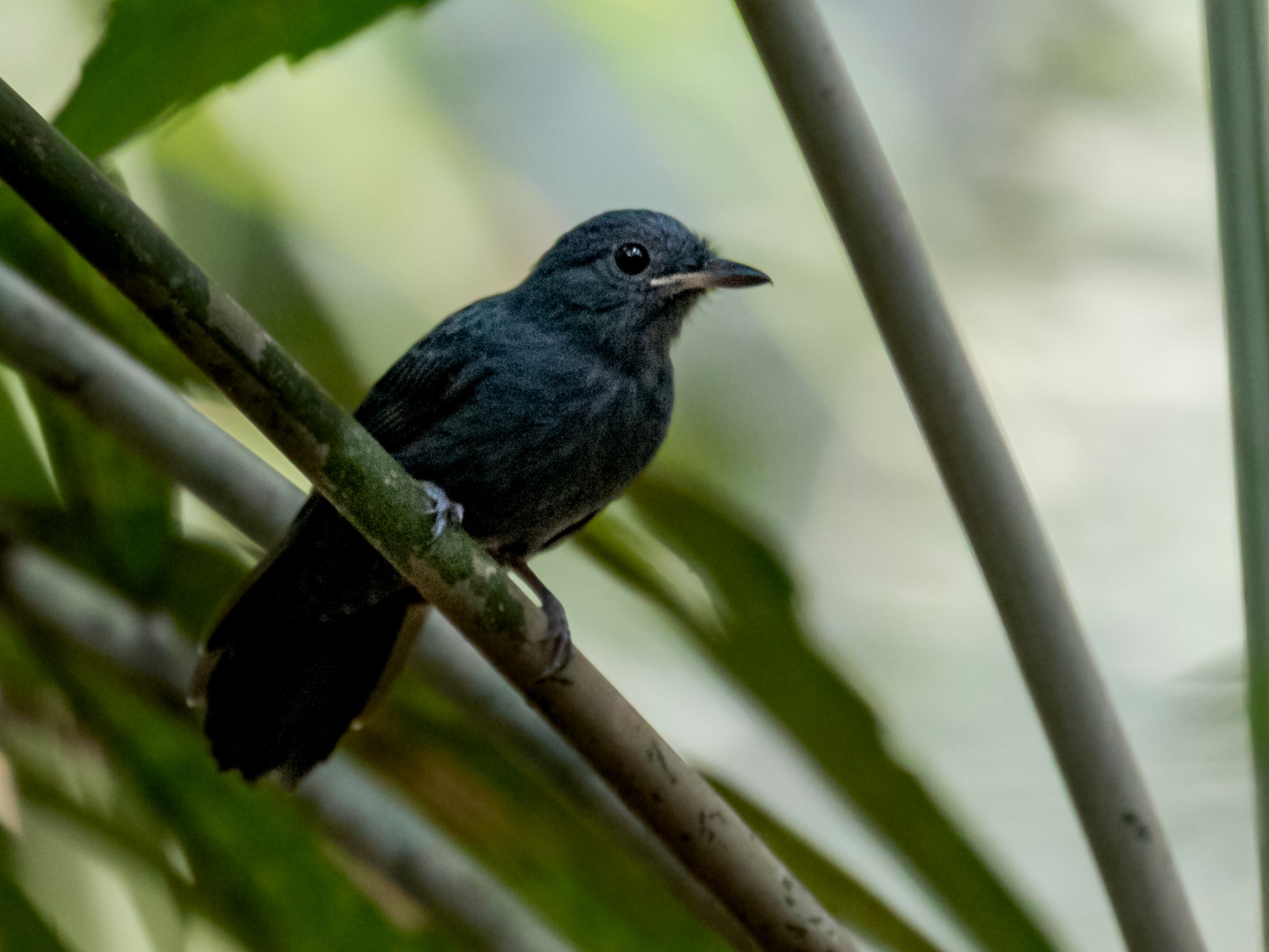

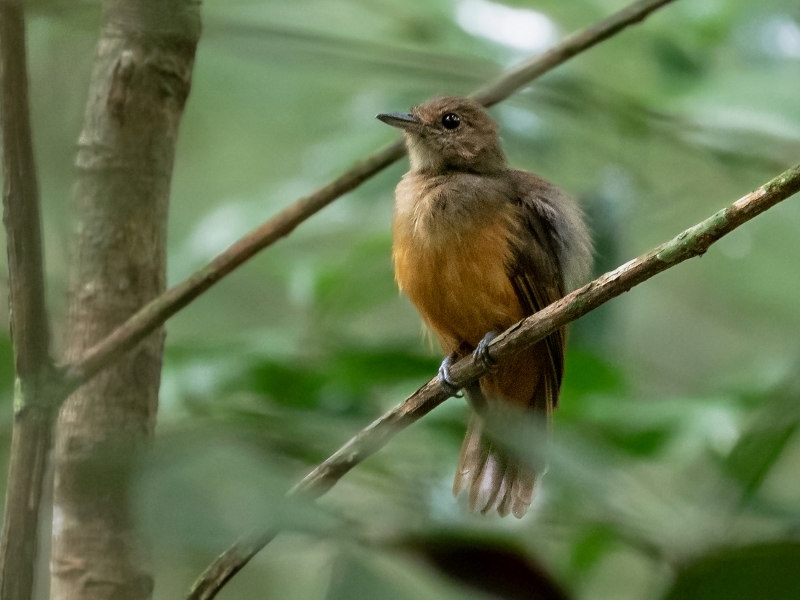

Conservation status
- Least Concern (IUCN 3.1)

Scientific classification
- Kingdom: Animalia
- Phylum: Chordata
- Class: Aves
- Order: Passeriformes
- Family: Thamnophilidae
- Genus: Thamnomanes
- Species: T. caesius

Binomial name
- Thamnomanes caesius (Temminck, 1820)

= Cinereous antshrike =

Species of bird

The cinereous antshrike (Thamnomanes caesius) is an insectivorous bird in subfamily Thamnophilinae of family Thamnophilidae, the "typical antbirds". It is found in Bolivia, Brazil, Colombia, Ecuador, French Guiana, Guyana, Peru, Suriname, and Venezuela.

== Taxonomy and systematics ==
The cinereous antshrike was described by the Dutch zoologist Coenraad Jacob Temminck in 1820 and given the binomial name Muscicapa caesius. It is now placed in the genus Thamnomanes which was introduced by the German ornithologist Jean Cabanis in 1847. The specific epithet caesius is the Latin for "bluish gray".

The cinereous antshrike and the bluish-slate antshrike (T. schistogynus) were treated by some authors in the early twentieth century as conspecific. They now are considered a superspecies.

The cinereous antshrike has these five subspecies:

- T. c. glaucus Cabanis, 1847
- T. c. persimilis Hellmayr, 1907
- T. c. simillimus Gyldenstolpe, 1951
- T. c. hoffmannsi Hellmayr, 1906
- T. c. caesius (Temminck, 1820)

A few twentieth century authors treated T. c. glaucus and T. c. persimilis together as a species separate from the cinereous antshrike.

== Description ==
The cinereous antshrike is 14 to 15 cm (5.5 to 5.9 in) long and weighs 16 to 18 g (0.56 to 0.63 oz). Adult males of the nominate subspecies T. c. caesius are almost entirely dark gray; the inner edges of their secondaries and their underwing coverts are white. Adult females have olive-brown upperparts with a small white patch between the scapulars. Their wings and tail are olive-brown with a rufous tinge. Their throat is buff, their breast, sides and flanks olive with a tawny-cinnamon tinge, and the center of their belly and their crissum tawny-cinnamon.

The other subspecies of the cinereous antshrike differ from the nominate and each other thus:

- T. c. hoffmannsi: male is paler than nominate with white streaks on the ear coverts and throat; female's throat is buff-white, flanks less olive and more tawny-cinnamon than nominate's
- T. c. persimilis: male slightly darker than hoffmannsi without white streaks; female has cinnamon-rufous lower breast, belly, and crissum and cinnamon-rufous tinge everywhere else
- T. c. simillimus: male darker than nominate with small white patch between the scapulars; female similar to persimilis female
- T. c. glaucus: male has whitish throat and large white intrascapular patch; female has large white intrascapular patch, deep tawny-rufous lower breast, belly, and crissum, and rufous tinge elsewhere

== Distribution and habitat ==
The cinereous antshrike has a disjunct distribution. The subspecies are found thus:

- T. c. glaucus: eastern Colombia south through eastern Ecuador into northeastern Peru, east through southern Venezuela, the Guianas, and in Brazil from northern Amazonas state east to the Atlantic in Amapá
- T. c. persimilis: central Brazil south of the Amazon between the Juruá and Tapajós rivers south through Rondônia and western Mato Grosso into extreme northeastern Bolivia
- T. c. simillimus: middle of the Purus River basin in south-central Brazil
- T. c. hoffmannsi: east-central Brazil south of the Amazon east from the Tapajós to western Maranhão and south to northeastern Mato Grosso
- T. c. caesius: separate from the others in coastal southeastern Brazil from Pernambuco south to Rio de Janeiro state and inland in Minas Gerais

The cinereous antshrike inhabits the understorey to mid-storey of terra firme, várzea, and igapó evergreen forest. It seldom occurs in secondary forest. In most areas it occurs below 600 m (2,000 ft) but reaches 700 m (2,300 ft) in Colombia and 1,100 m (3,600 ft) on tepuis in Venezuela.

== Behavior ==
=== Movement ===
The cinereous antshrike is believed to be a year-round resident throughout its range.

=== Feeding ===
The cinereous antshrike's diet includes insects and other arthropods. It mostly forages singly, in pairs, and family groups and usually as the central member of a mixed-species feeding flock. It typically forages from near the ground up to about 20 m (70 ft) above it. It usually captures prey with a sally from a perch to capture it in mid-air and less frequently from foliage, stems, and vines. It occasionally attends army ant swarms.

=== Breeding ===
The cinereous antshrike breeds between July and December in Brazil and August to December in French Guiana; its season elsewhere has not been defined. Its nest is a deep cup made of rotten leaves, fungal rhizomorphs, and rootlets and lined with softer plant and fungal fibers. It resembles a pile of dead leaves or debris. It is typically placed between 1 and 3.5 m (3 and 10 ft) above the ground in a bush, sapling, or vine tangle. The clutch size is two eggs. The incubation period, time to fledging, and details of parental care are not known.

=== Vocalization ===
The cinereous antshrike's song is a "series, starting with some slow, sharply rising notes, then descending as a short rattle". It has been rendered as "whee? whee? whee? whee-whee-whee-wheep-wheep-whip-whipwhip-p-p-p-p-p-p-prrrrr". Its calls include "a staccato 'wer-chicory' " and "wu-chidididik".

== Status ==
The IUCN has assessed the cinereous antshrike as being of Least Concern. It has a large range. Its population size is not known and is believed to be decreasing. No immediate threats have been identified. It is considered fairly common to common in most of its range. Vast areas of suitable habitat are protected except within the range of the nominate subspecies T. c. caesius. For it, "suitable forest habitats throughout its range have been greatly reduced by deforestation".
