= Médio Juruá Extractive Reserve =

Extractive reserve in the state of Amazonas, Brazil

- Reserva Extrativista Médio Juruá
- IUCN category VI (protected area with sustainable use of natural resources)
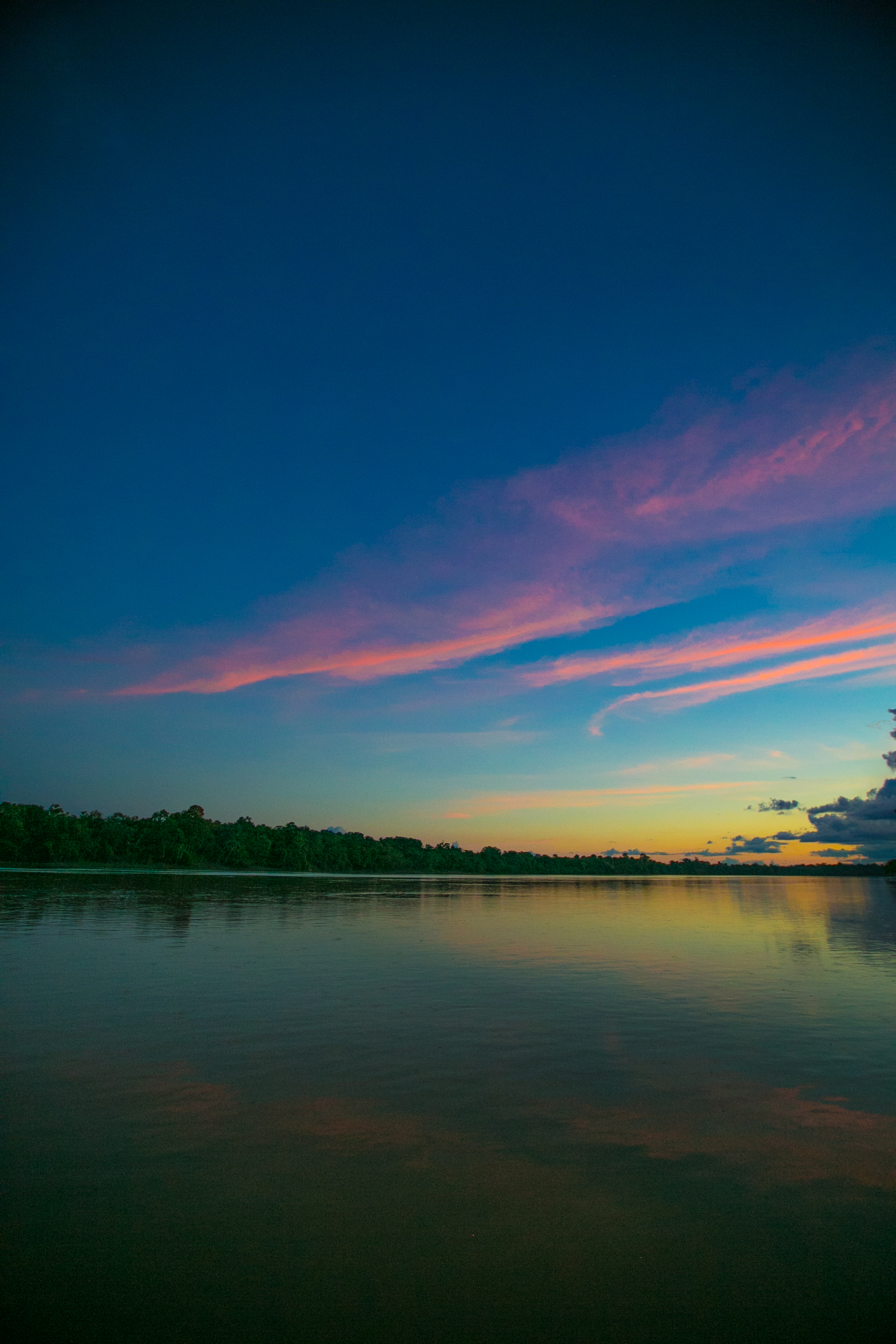
- Shore of the Juruá near Carauari

- Location within Brazil
- Nearest city: Carauari, Amazonas
- Coordinates: 5°16′19″S 67°25′34″W
- Area: 251,577.13 hectares (621,660.6 acres)
- Designation: Extractive reserve
- Created: 4 March 1997
- Administrator: Chico Mendes Institute for Biodiversity Conservation

The Médio Juruá Extractive Reserve (Portuguese: Reserva Extrativista Médio Juruá) is an extractive reserve in the state of Amazonas Brazil.

== Location ==
The Médio Juruá Extractive Reserve is in the municipality of Carauari in the state of Amazonas. It has an area of 251,577.13 hectares (621,660.6 acres). The terrain is flat. The reserve is on the left bank of the Juruá River, which meanders in a generally northeast direction. It contains oxbow lakes from former meanders. The population practices agriculture on the convex margins of the river, with their homes slightly higher up.

== Environment ==
The Médio Juruá Extractive Reserve is in the Amazon biome. Average temperatures range from 22 to 32 °C (72 to 90 °F). Vegetation is relatively intact due to the distance from urban centres, with very high biodiversity. Human activity has little impact, with degraded areas recovering quickly. Endemic species of flora include rubber trees (Hevea species), Ocotea species), Virola surinamensis, Calycophyllum spruceanum and Bombax globosum.

Fauna include white-lipped peccary (Tayassu pecari), red brocket (Mazama americana), South American tapir (Tapirus terrestris), red-handed howler (Alouatta belzebul), Parrot species, Amazonian manatee (Trichechus inunguis), jaguar (Panthera onca), black caiman (Melanosuchus niger), Alagoas curassow (Mitu mitu), Piping guan (Pipile), Crypturellus species and fish such as Arapaima gigas, tambaqui (Colossoma macropomum) and silver arowana (Osteoglossum bicirrhosum).

== History ==
The Médio Juruá Extractive Reserve was created by presidential decree on 4 March 1997. It is administered by the Chico Mendes Institute for Biodiversity Conservation (ICMBio). It is classified as IUCN protected area category VI (protected area with sustainable use of natural resources). The extractive reserve is an area used by the traditional population who practice extraction, subsistence agriculture and small scale livestock husbandry. Its basic objectives are to protect the livelihoods and culture of these people and to ensure sustainable use of the natural resources. The land is all publicly owned.

The utilisation plan was approved on 24 November 1997. On 23 November 1999, the Instituto Nacional de Colonização e Reforma Agrária (National Institute for Colonization and Agrarian Reform) recognized the extractive reserve as an Agro-extractive settlement project for 280 families. It became part of the Central Amazon Ecological Corridor, established in 2002. On 29 January 2007, IBAMA created a deliberative council. The deliberative council, which manages the reserve, is chaired by ICMBio and has representatives of public and civil society organisations and the traditional population. The conservation unit is supported by the Amazon Region Protected Areas Program.

A decree on 13 October 2014 added over 30,000 hectares (74,000 acres) to the Médio Juruá Extractive Reserve. The decree also established the Serra do Gandarela National Park in Minas Gerais with 31,200 hectares (77,000 acres), the Guaricana National Park in Paraná with 49,300 hectares (122,000 acres) and the Nascentes Geraizeiras Sustainable Development Reserve in Minas Gerais with 38,100 hectares (94,000 acres).

== Sources ==
- CEC Central da Amazônia (in Portuguese), ISA: Instituto Socioambiental
- Full list: PAs supported by ARPA, ARPA
- Governo federal cria e amplia unidades de conservação em Minas Gerais, Paraná, Amazonas e Pará (in Portuguese), Secretaria de Governo auxilia o Presidente da República, 14 October 2014
- Resex Médio Juruá (in Portuguese), Chico Mendes Institute for Biodiversity Conservation
- RESEX do Médio Juruá (in Portuguese), ISA: Instituto Socioambiental
- Unidade de Conservação: Reserva Extrativista Médio Juruá (in Portuguese), MMA: Ministério do Meio Ambiente
