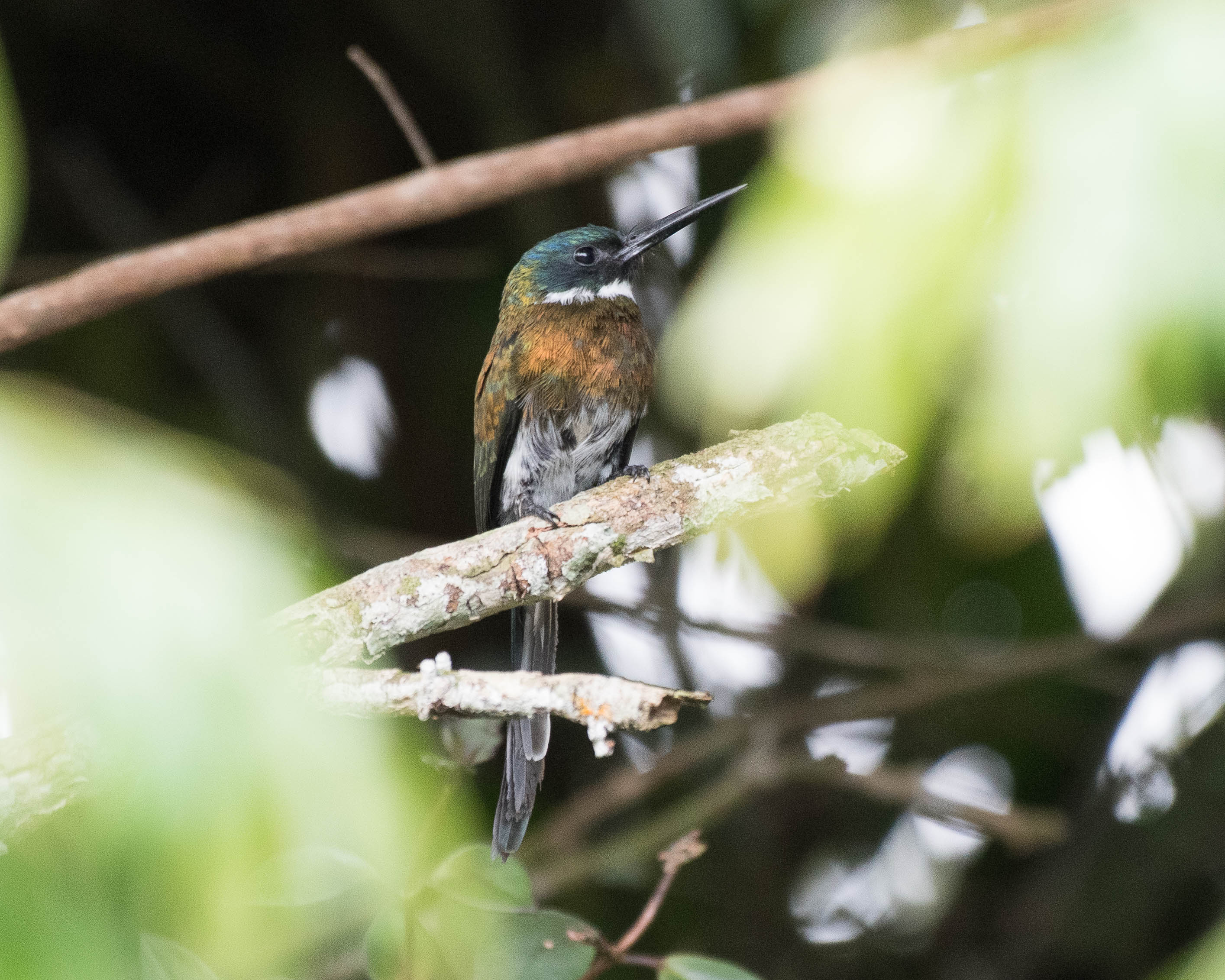

Conservation status
- Least Concern (IUCN 3.1)

Scientific classification
- Kingdom: Animalia
- Phylum: Chordata
- Class: Aves
- Order: Piciformes
- Family: Galbulidae
- Genus: Galbula
- Species: G. leucogastra

Binomial name
- Galbula leucogastra Vieillot, 1817

= Bronzy jacamar =

Species of bird

The bronzy jacamar (Galbula leucogastra) is a species of bird in the family Galbulidae. It occurs in Bolivia, Brazil, Colombia, French Guiana, Guyana, Suriname, and Venezuela.

== Taxonomy and systematics ==
The bronzy jacamar is monotypic. It and purplish jacamar (Galbula chalcothorax) were formerly considered conspecific; they now form a superspecies. Birds in eastern Brazil along the Tapajós River were suggested as a subspecies but were not accepted as such. In addition, the species is thought to have hybridized with green-tailed jacamar (G. galbula) in Suriname.

== Description ==
The bronzy jacamar is 19 to 22 cm (7.5 to 8.7 in) long and weighs 15 to 18 g (0.53 to 0.63 oz). The male's crown and face are dark metallic greenish blue. The rest of the upper parts and the breast are metallic bronzy green and sometimes have a slight purple gloss. It has a black chin and white throat and belly; the latter appears speckled with black. The female differs by having the sides of the face dark gray and the throat and belly buff or yellowish.

== Distribution and habitat ==
According to a 2016 map, the bronzy jacamar is found in southern Venezuela, far eastern Colombia, much of west-central Brazil, far northern Bolivia, and far southeastern Peru. However, there are eBird reports across southern Colombia and one in Ecuador since then that have not been further evaluated.

The bronzy jacamar is found in a wide variety of habitats. Cornell University's Birds of the World describes them as "Edges and clearings of primary and secondary terra firme and várzea (igapó) forests, white-sand campinarana in Amazonia, wooded savannas and (at least in coastal French Guiana) marshes scattered with woodlots, regularly along streams and rivers in lowlands; locally to 900 m [2950 ft]. Occurs locally in gallery forest, dry forest and cerrado in Brazil, where it occupies light undergrowth and open lower canopies."

== Behavior ==
=== Feeding ===
The bronzy jacamar's diet includes a wide variety of flying insects, but "perhaps fewer Lepidoptera or Odonata than do other Galbula species." It perches on exposed branches by itself or in small groups, typically between 2 and 10 m (6.6 and 32.8 ft) high, and sallies out to catch its prey. It sometimes joins mixed-species foraging flocks.

=== Breeding ===
Three bronzy jacamar nests have been described. Two of them were in arboreal termite nests and the third was in a epiphytic bromeliad on a tree trunk. At one in a termite nest both adults fed the nestling; at the bromeliad nest the female fed the nestlings.

=== Vocalization ===
The bronzy jacamar apparently has two songs. One is "ascending and accelerating whistling notes" that end with a trill . The other is described as "weeee, weep-pip-pweeeeee, weep-pip-pweeeeee, weep-pip-pweeeeee" . A call is .

== Status ==
The IUCN has assessed the bronzy jacamar as being of Least Concern. It appears to be uncommon in most of its range and "may suffer to some extent from overall habitat loss."

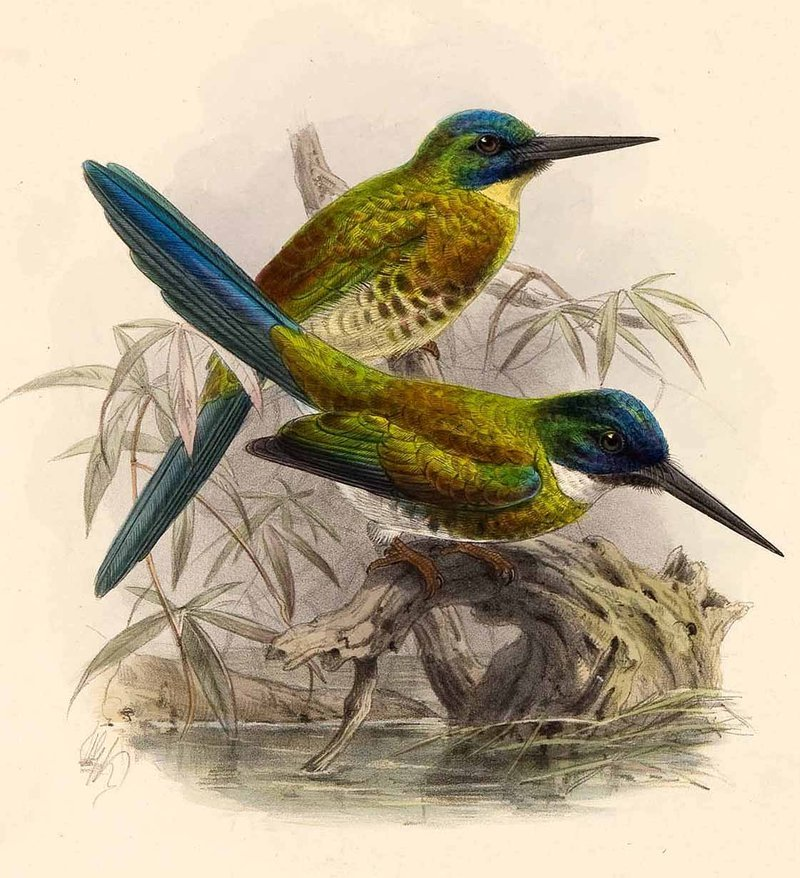
Bronzy Jacamar / Galbula leucogastra
