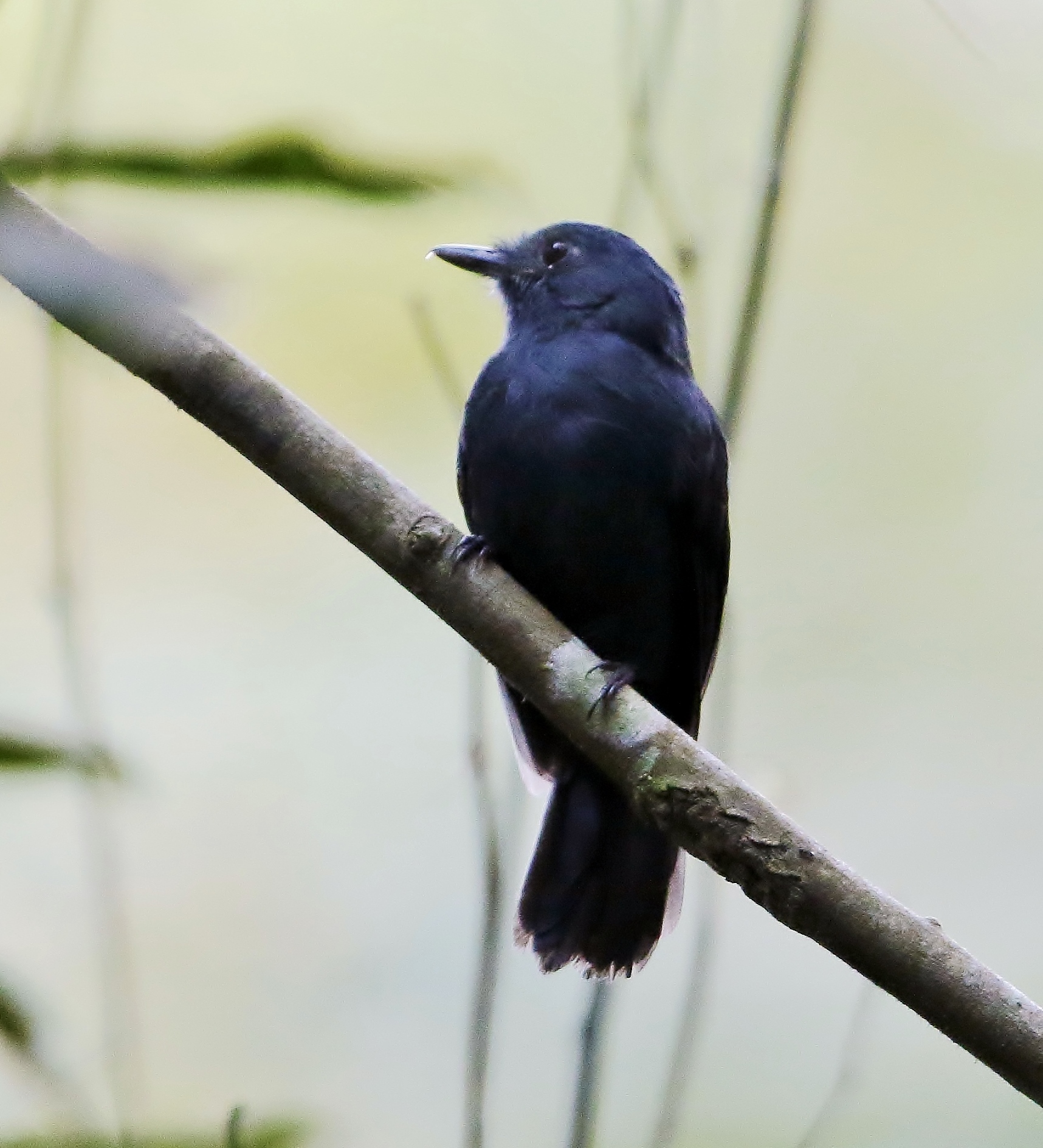
- Bluish-slate antshrike (Thamnomanes schistogynus)

Scientific classification
- Kingdom: Animalia
- Phylum: Chordata
- Class: Aves
- Order: Passeriformes
- Family: Thamnophilidae
- Genus: Thamnomanes; Cabanis, 1847

Type species
- Lanius caesia Lichtenstein, 1823

Species
- 4, see text

= Thamnomanes =

Genus of birds

Thamnomanes is a genus of insectivorous birds in the antbird family, Thamnophilidae. They are restricted to the Neotropics and are important components of forest mixed-species feeding flocks.

The genus Thamnomanes was introduced by the German ornithologist Jean Cabanis in 1847. The name combines the Ancient Greek words thamnos "bush" and -manēs "fond of". The type species was subsequently designated as the cinereous antshrike.

This genus contains the following species:

Image	Common name	Scientific name	Distribution
	Dusky-throated antshrike	Thamnomanes ardesiacus	Amazonia
	Cinereous antshrike	Thamnomanes caesius	Amazonia
	Saturnine antshrike	Thamnomanes saturninus	southern Amazonia
	Bluish-slate antshrike	Thamnomanes schistogynus	southwestern Amazonia
