= Baixo Juruá Extractive Reserve =

Extractive reserve in Amazonas, Brazil

- Reserva Extrativista do Baixo Juruá
- IUCN category VI (protected area with sustainable use of natural resources)
- Location within Brazil
- Nearest city: Juruá, Amazonas
- Coordinates: 3.539599°S 66.001817°W
- Area: 187,982 hectares (464,510 acres)
- Designation: Extractive reserve
- Created: 1 August 2001
- Administrator: Chico Mendes Institute for Biodiversity Conservation

The Baixo Juruá Extractive Reserve (Portuguese: Reserva Extrativista do Baixo Juruá) is an extractive reserve in the state of Amazonas, Brazil. It contains an area of almost untouched Amazon rainforest inhabited by communities that rely on manioc farming, small-scale animal husbandry, fishing, hunting and gathering.

== Location ==
The Baixo Juruá Extractive Reserve is divided between the municipalities of Uarini (38.33%) and Juruá (61.67%) in Amazonas. It has an area of 187,982 hectares (464,510 acres). The reserve is about 1,200 kilometres (750 mi) from Manaus by boat. The reserve is mostly in the interfluvial region between the Juruá and the Uarini rivers. It is bounded by the Juruá on the west, the Andirá River to the south, the Copacá River, a tributary of the Uarini, on the east and the Arapapá stream, a tributary of the Juruá, to the north. The Juruá and Uarini rivers flow north from the reserve, passing on either side of the Kumaru do Lago Ualá Indigenous Territory, to join the Solimões River. The south of the reserve adjoins the Tefé National Forest.

== History ==
The Baixo Juruá Extractive Reserve was created by federal decree on 1 August 2001 with the objectives of ensuring sustainable use and conservation of renewable natural resources, protecting the livelihood and culture of the local extractive population. It is classed as IUCN protected area category VI (protected area with sustainable use of natural resources). It became part of the Central Amazon Ecological Corridor, established in 2002. The reserve is managed by the Chico Mendes Institute for Biodiversity Conservation. The deliberative council was created on 4 November 2008. The participative management plan was approved on 16 November 2009. As of 2016 the reserve was supported by the Amazon Region Protected Areas Program.

== Environment ==
Altitudes range from 40 to 100 metres (130 to 330 ft) above sea level. Average daily temperatures range from 13 to 35 °C (55 to 95 °F) with an average of 24 °C (75 °F). Annual rainfall is 2,255 millimetres (88.8 in). Soils are generally poor apart from areas that receive deposits of nutrients from the mineral-rich Juruá River flood waters. The reserve is almost completely covered by dense tropical forest, with only about 0.6% cleared for fields by the residents. Forests coverage includes flooded and terra firma alluvial Amazon rainforest ecosystems. The rich forest remains largely untouched. There are abundant fish.

== Economy ==
The reserve is home to several communities, some very isolated and traditional with strong elements of the local indigenous people, and some more influenced by the external world. Most of the communities are on the banks of the Juruá or the banks of streams or lakes. The staple food is manioc flour, enhanced by hunting wild animals and gathering fruits, roots and leaves of the forest plants. Many communities also keep chickens, ducks, pigs and cattle. There is perceived ongoing degradation to some environments due to overfishing of some species and excessive capture of turtles and other wildlife. IBAMA/Tefé is unable to provide enough competent professionals to handle these issues in the large and inaccessible reserve.

== Sources ==
- CEC Central da Amazônia (in Portuguese), ISA: Instituto Socioambiental
- Full list: PAs supported by ARPA, ARPA
- Resex do Baixo Juruá (in Portuguese), ICMBio: Chico Mendes Institute for Biodiversity Conservation, archived from the original on 2016-10-22
- RESEX do Baixo Juruá (in Portuguese), ISA: Instituto Socioambiental
- Unidade de Conservação: Reserva Extrativista Baixo Juruá (in Portuguese), MMA: Ministério do Meio Ambiente
