= Bauana River =

- Location within Brazil
- Native name: Rio Bauana (Portuguese)

Location
- Country: Brazil

Physical characteristics
- Source
  - location: Amazonas
- Mouth
  - location: Lago Tefé
  - coordinates: 3.487720°S 65.021849°W

Basin features
- River system: Tefé River

The Bauana River (Portuguese: Rio Bauana) is a river of Amazonas, Brazil. It is a tributary of the Tefé River.

The river forms the northern boundary of the Tefé National Forest, created in 1989.

== See also ==
- List of rivers of Amazonas (Brazilian state)
