= Copacá River =

- Location within Brazil
- Native name: Rio Copacá (Portuguese)

Location
- Country: Brazil

Physical characteristics
- Mouth
  - coordinates: 3.350892°S 65.764815°W

Basin features
- River system: Uarini River

The Copacá River (Portuguese: Rio Copacá) is a river of Amazonas, Brazil. It is a right tributary of the Uarini River.

The Copacá River defines the eastern boundary of the 187,982 hectares (464,510 acres) Baixo Juruá Extractive Reserve, created in 2001. The Copacá is a 25 metres (82 ft) wide river that lies within the eastern limit of the reserve. The floating litter banks of the river are home to a variety of allochthonous insectivore species of fish, particularly of the genera Microglanis and Phenacorhamdia.

== See also ==
- List of rivers of Amazonas (Brazilian state)

== Sources ==
- Carvalho, Lucélia Nobre; Fidelis, Luana; Arruda, Rafael; Galuch, André; Zuanon, Jansen (January–March 2013), "Second floor, please: the fish fauna of floating litter banks in Amazonian streams and rivers" (PDF), Neotropical Ichthyology, 11 (1), Porto Alegre, doi:10.1590/s1679-62252013000100010, ISSN 1679-6225
- Unidade de Conservação: Reserva Extrativista Baixo Juruá (in Portuguese), MMA: Ministério do Meio Ambiente
