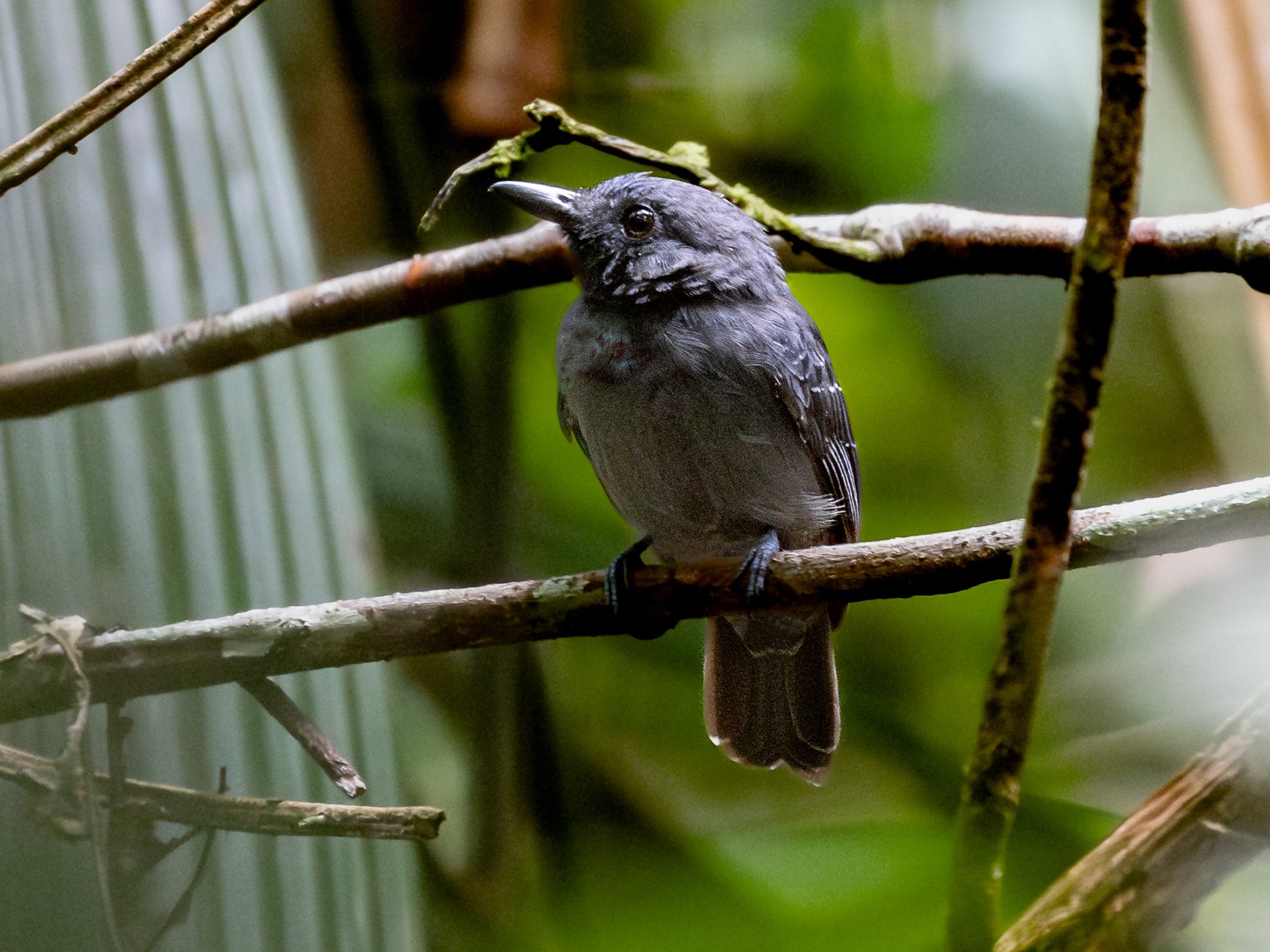

Conservation status
- Least Concern (IUCN 3.1)

Scientific classification
- Kingdom: Animalia
- Phylum: Chordata
- Class: Aves
- Order: Passeriformes
- Family: Thamnophilidae
- Genus: Thamnomanes
- Species: T. saturninus

Binomial name
- Thamnomanes saturninus (Pelzeln, 1868)

= Saturnine antshrike =

Species of bird

The saturnine antshrike (Thamnomanes saturninus) is a species of bird in subfamily Thamnophilinae of family Thamnophilidae, the "typical antbirds". It is found in Bolivia, Brazil, and Peru.

== Taxonomy and systematics ==
The saturnine antshrike was described by the Austrian ornithologist August von Pelzeln in 1868 and given the binomial name Thamnophilus saturninus. During the twentieth century several authors placed it in genus Dysithamnus and treated it and what is now the dusky-throated antshrike (T. ardesiacus) as conspecific. The two now are considered a superspecies.

The saturnine antshrike has two subspecies, the nominate T. s. saturninus (Pelzeln, 1868) and T. s. huallagae (Cory, 1916).

== Description ==
The saturnine antshrike is 13.5 to 14.5 cm (5.3 to 5.7 in) long and weighs 19 to 21 g (0.67 to 0.74 oz). Adult males of the nominate subspecies have darkish gray upperparts with a white patch between their scapulars. Their wings are darkish gray with white edges to feathers at the bend and white tips on the coverts. Their tail is darkish gray with small white tips on the feathers. Their throat and upper breast are black and the rest of their underparts darkish gray with usually some white edges on the belly feathers. Adult females have olive-brown upperparts with a rufescent tinge. Their wings and tail are rufous. Their throat is white, their breast olive, and the rest of their underparts deep tawny-buff. Males of subspecies T. s. huallagae have less black on their throat than the nominate; females have gray spots on their throat and a darker breast than the nominate.

== Distribution and habitat ==
Subspecies T. s. huallagae of the saturnine antshrike is the more western of the two. It is found south of the Amazon and Marañón rivers in northeastern Peru and into southwestern Amazonian Brazil's Acre state. The nominate subspecies is found in south-central Amazonian Brazil south of the Amazon from Acre east to the Tapajós and Teles Pires rivers and south to Rondônia and northern Mato Grosso, and into extreme northeastern Bolivia. The species primarily inhabits the understorey of terra firme evergreen forest and occurs less often in várzea forest. In elevation it occurs mostly below 300 m (1,000 ft) but reaches 650 m (2,100 ft) in Bolivia.

== Behavior ==
=== Movement ===
The saturnine antshrike is believed to be a year-round resident throughout its range.

=== Feeding ===
The saturnine antshrike's diet includes insects and probably other arthropods. It mostly forages singly, in pairs, and family groups and usually as part of a mixed-species feeding flock. It typically forages between about 1 and 4 m (3 and 13 ft) above the ground. It usually captures prey with a sally from a perch to foliage and stems, and sometimes from trunks or the ground. It sometimes attends army ant swarms.

=== Breeding ===
The santunine antshrike's nesting season has not been detailed but includes August. One nest was a cup attached between two limbs of a sapling about 3 m (10 ft) above the ground. Nothing else is known about the species' breeding biology.

=== Vocalization ===
The saturnine antshrike's song is an "accelerated, ascending series of notes, at first grating, then gradually changing to sharp and piercing". Its calls include a "short 'chirr' ", a "downslurred rasp", and an "abrupt, clearer note".

== Status ==
The IUCN has assessed the saturnine antshrike as being of Least Concern. It has a large range. Its population size is not known and is believed to be stable. No immediate threats have been identified. It is considered fairly common across its range, which includes some large protected areas and "remains little developed and relatively inaccessible".
