= Carauari =

Municipality of Amazonas, Brazil

- Municipality
- Flag Coat of arms

- Location of the municipality inside Amazonas

- Location in Brazil
- Coordinates: 4°52′58″S 66°53′45″W
- Country: Brazil
- Region: North
- State: Amazonas

Population (2020)
  - Total: 28,508
- Time zone: UTC−4 (AMT)

Carauari is a municipality located in the Brazilian state of Amazonas. Its population was 28,508 (2020) and its area is 25,767 km^{2}.

The city is served by Carauari Airport.

== Geography ==
The town is in the Juruá-Purus moist forests ecoregion. The municipality contains about 5% of the Tefé National Forest, created in 1989. The municipality contains 251,577-hectare (621,660-acre) Médio Juruá Extractive Reserve, created in 1997, on the left bank of the meandering Juruá River. It also contains the 632,949-hectare (1,564,050-acre) Uacari Sustainable Development Reserve, created in 2005.

=== Climate ===
Carauari has a tropical rainforest climate (Köppen Af) with unpleasantly hot and humid weather year-round. Rainfall is significant throughout, although the period from June to August is drier than the remainder of the year.

Climate data for Carauari
Month	Jan	Feb	Mar	Apr	May	Jun	Jul	Aug	Sep	Oct	Nov	Dec	Year
Mean daily maximum °C (°F)	30.0 (86.0)	30.4 (86.7)	30.5 (86.9)	30.2 (86.4)	30.9 (87.6)	30.0 (86.0)	30.0 (86.0)	31.5 (88.7)	31.9 (89.4)	31.5 (88.7)	31.0 (87.8)	30.6 (87.1)	30.7 (87.3)
Daily mean °C (°F)	25.9 (78.6)	26.4 (79.5)	26.4 (79.5)	26.2 (79.2)	26.4 (79.5)	25.8 (78.4)	25.4 (77.7)	26.2 (79.2)	26.7 (80.1)	26.6 (79.9)	26.4 (79.5)	26.3 (79.3)	26.2 (79.2)
Mean daily minimum °C (°F)	21.9 (71.4)	22.4 (72.3)	22.3 (72.1)	22.3 (72.1)	21.9 (71.4)	21.7 (71.1)	20.9 (69.6)	21.0 (69.8)	21.5 (70.7)	21.8 (71.2)	21.9 (71.4)	22.0 (71.6)	21.8 (71.2)
Average rainfall mm (inches)	301 (11.9)	242 (9.5)	320 (12.6)	307 (12.1)	231 (9.1)	126 (5.0)	89 (3.5)	105 (4.1)	153 (6.0)	195 (7.7)	235 (9.3)	283 (11.1)	2,587 (101.9)
Source: "Carauari Climate". Climate Data.
