= Juruá, Amazonas =

Municipality of Amazonas, Brazil

Juruá
- Municipality
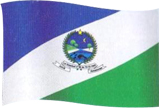
- Flag

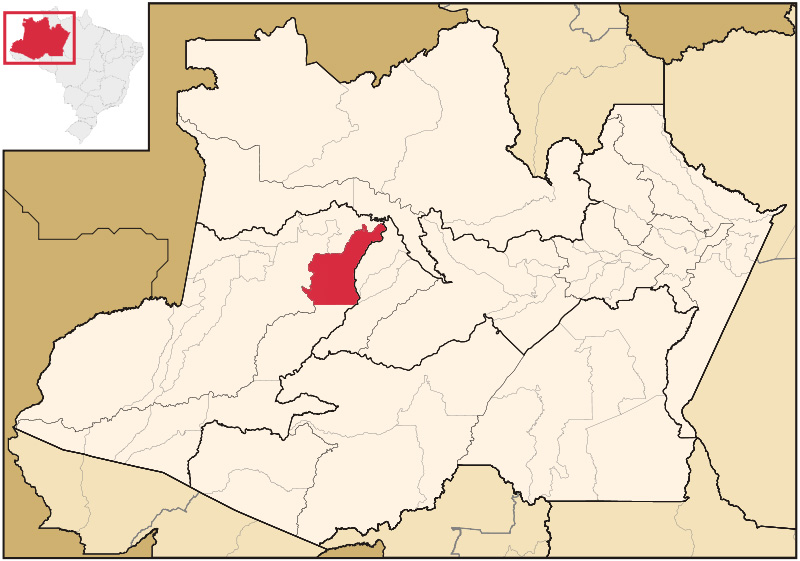
- Location of the municipality inside Amazonas

- Location in Brazil
- Coordinates: 3°28′51″S 66°4′8″W
- Country: Brazil
- Region: North
- State: Amazonas

Population (2020)
  - Total: 15,106
- Time zone: UTC−4 (BRT)
  - Summer (DST): UTC−4 (DST no longer used)

Juruá (Portuguese pronunciation: [ʒuɾuˈa]) is a municipality located in the Brazilian state of Amazonas. Its population was 15,106 (2020) and its area is 19,400 km^{2}.

The municipality contains 62% of the 187,982-hectare (464,510-acre) Baixo Juruá Extractive Reserve, created in 2001. The municipality contains about 12% of the Tefé National Forest, created in 1989.
