= Uarini =

Municipality of Amazonas, Brazil

- Municipality
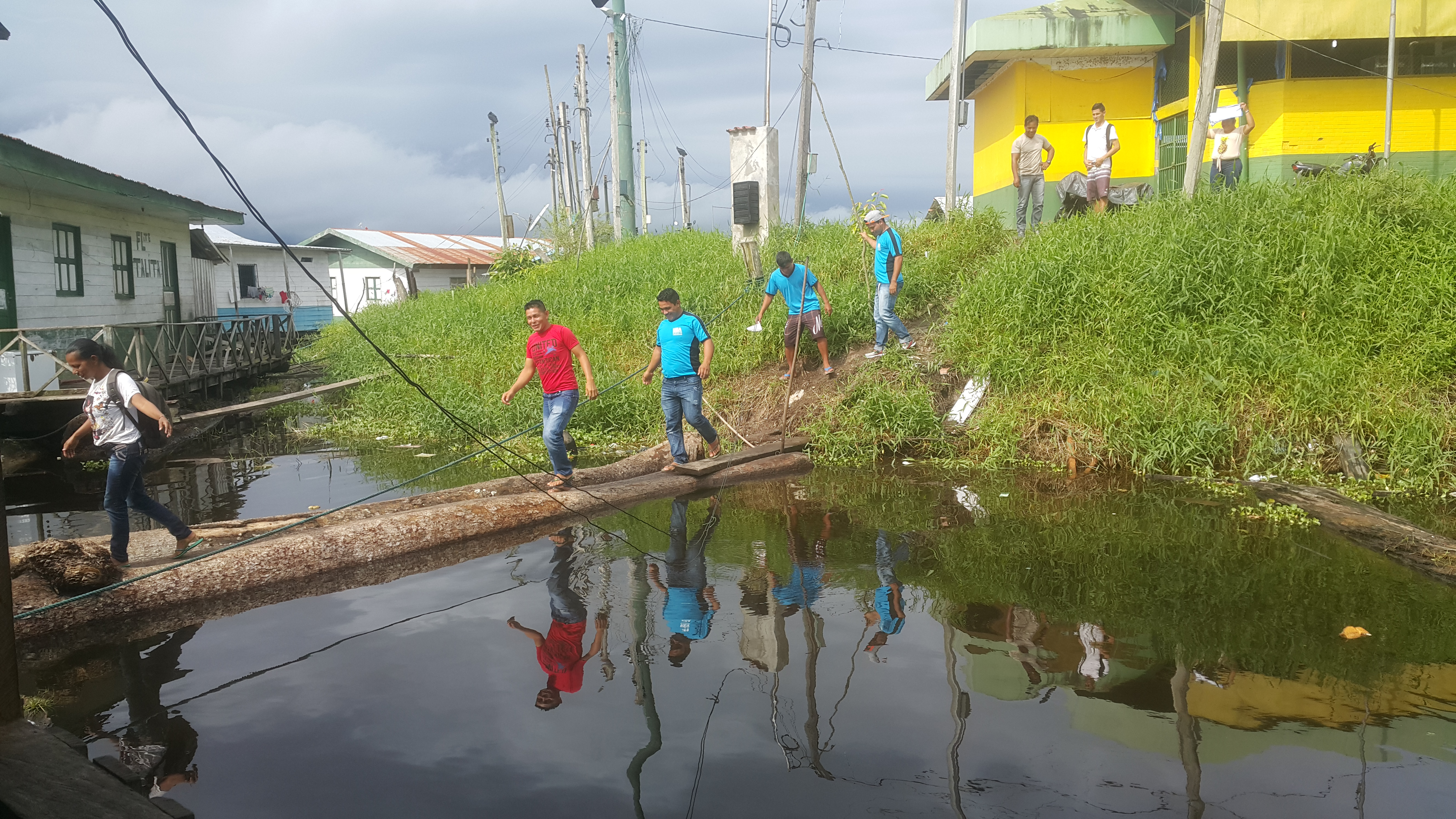

- Location of the municipality inside Amazonas

- Location in Brazil
- Coordinates: 2°59′24″S 65°5′28″W
- Country: Brazil
- Region: North
- State: Amazonas

Population (2020)
  - Total: 13,690
- Time zone: UTC−4 (AMT)

Uarini is a municipality located in the Brazilian state of Amazonas. According to estimates of the Brazilian Institute of Geography and Statistics (IBGE), its population was 13,690 inhabitants in 2020. Its area is 10,246 km^{2}.

The municipality contains 38% of the 187,982-hectare (464,510-acre) Baixo Juruá Extractive Reserve, created in 2001.

== History ==
It has its history linked to the history of Tefé, which goes back to the village founded at the end of century XVII by the Jesuit Samuel Fritz. Until the end of the seventeenth century, disputes between the Spaniards and the Portuguese overlapped in the territory, only consolidating under the military occupation of Portugal in 1790. As a municipality, Tefé came to possess an area of 500,000 km^{2}. From the middle of the 19th century onwards, dismemberment of its territory began, giving rise to the new municipalities of São Paulo de Olivença, Coari, Fonte Boa, São Felipe (now Eirunepé), Xibauá (now Carauari) Japurá and Maraã.

At the end of 1981 Tefé had an administrative structure in which five sub-districts were planned: Tefé, Caiambé, Alvarães, Jarauá and Uarini.

== Economy ==
- Primary Sector
  - Agriculture: is the most productive economic activity, with special emphasis for the culture of the cassava, from which the flour of Uarini is made. The brown-nut is in 2nd place in the economy. It has crops of rice, beans, jute, mallow, corn and sugarcane between temporary crops and, mango, avocado, banana, orange and lemon among permanent crops.
  - Livestock: in economic terms livestock has insignificant role.
  - Poultry: practiced in essentially domestic molds, aimed at subsistence and local consumption, not generating income for families.
  - Plant Extractivism: it reaches its greatest expression in the exploitation of native rubber, Brazil nut and wood.
- Secondary Sector
  - Industries: pottery, baking, carpentry, furniture and metallurgy.
- Tertiary sector
  - Retail: retailer.

Of the 5 counties in the country that had decreases in the HDI between 1991 and 2000, three are from Amazonas : Uarini, whose HDI increased from 0.611 to 0.599; Silves, from 0.684 to 0.675; And São Sebastião do Uatumã, from 0.661 to 0.659. This occurred solely because of decreases registered in the dimension of income, which were not offset by the positive increments observed in the dimensions longevity and education.
