= Tefé River =

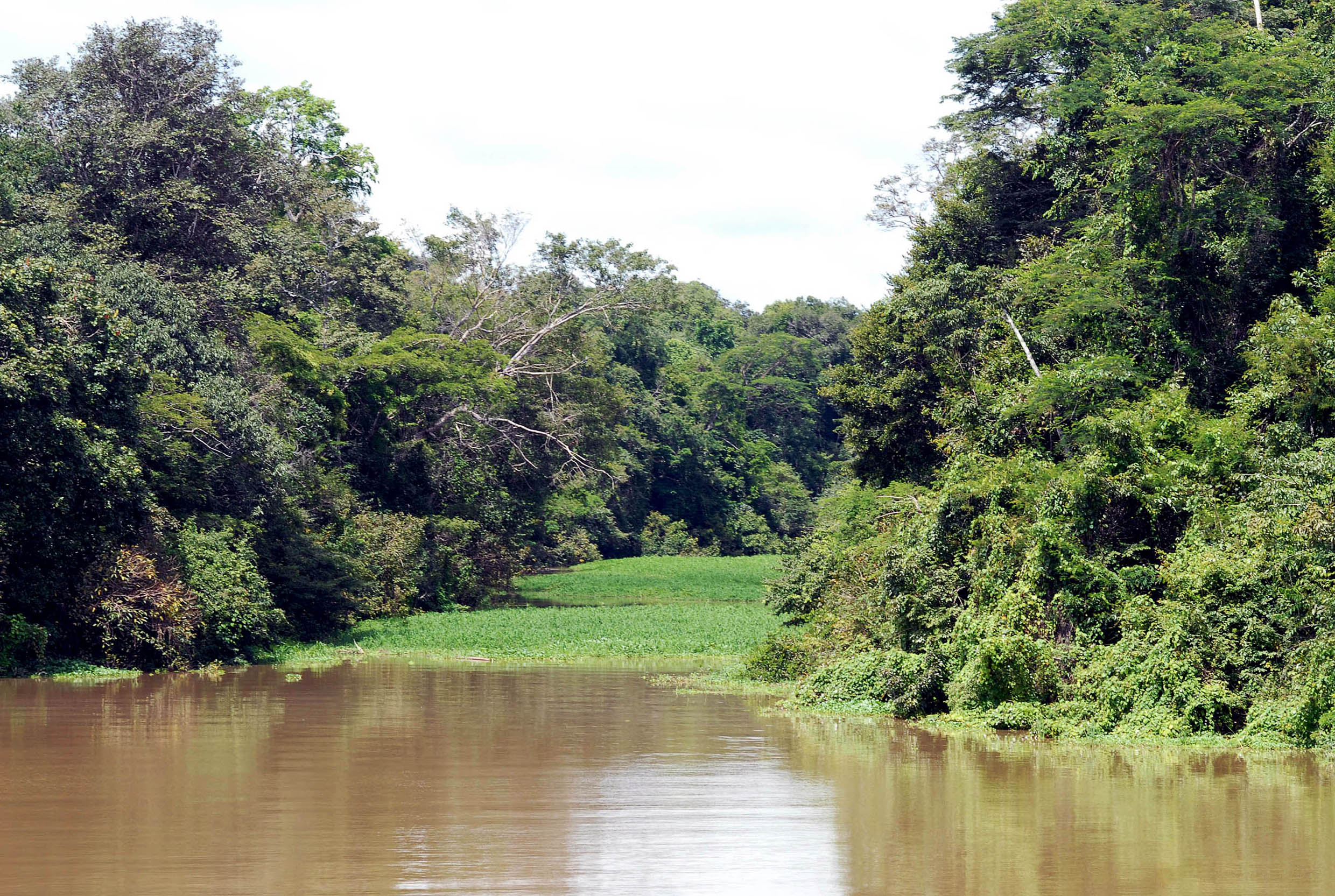

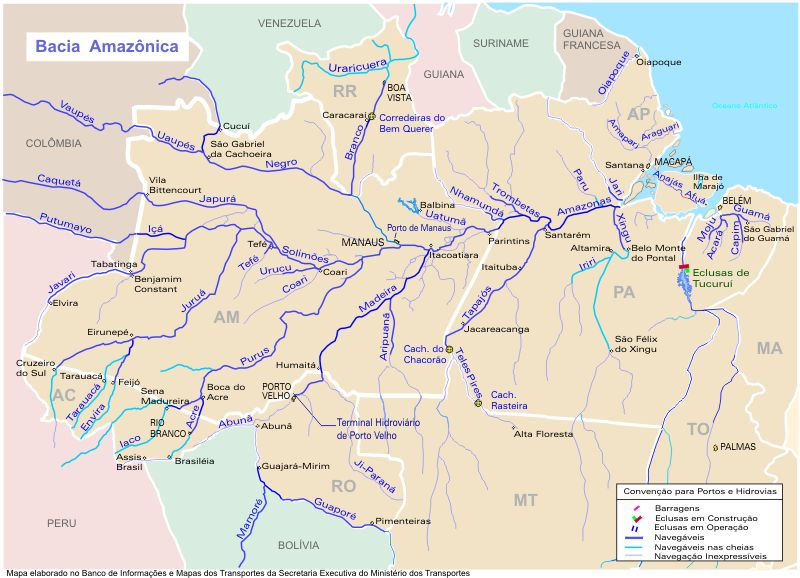
- Tefé River center-left (west of Manaus)

Location
- Country: Brazil
- State: Amazonas

Physical characteristics
- Source
  - location: Amazonas
  - coordinates: 5°18′45.6948″S 66°45′59.3244″W
  - elevation: 117 m (384 ft)
- Mouth: Solimões
  - location: Tefé, Amazonas
  - coordinates: 3°22′31.9764″S 64°38′56.8464″W
  - elevation: 26 m (85 ft)
- Length: 450 km (280 mi)
- Basin size: 27,960 km^{2} (10,800 mi^{2})
- Discharge
  - location: Tefé (near mouth)
  - average: 1,350 m^{3}/s (48,000 cu ft/s)

Basin features
- River system: Solimões
- Tributaries
  - left: Repartimento, Igarapé Teani, Igarapé Curimatá de Cima, Curimatá de Baixo, Bauana
  - right: Igarapé Ingá

The Tefé River (Teffé River in early accounts; Portuguese: Rio Tefé) is a tributary of the Amazon River (Solimões section) in Amazonas state in north-western Brazil.

The Tefé River flows through the Juruá-Purus moist forests ecoregion. It forms the eastern boundary of the Tefé National Forest, created in 1989. Immediately before merging into the Amazon, it forms Lake Tefé (Portuguese: Lago Tefé). The city of Tefé is located on the banks of the lake. The Tefé River is a blackwater river.

== See also ==
- List of rivers of Amazonas
