= Juruá River =

Yuruá River
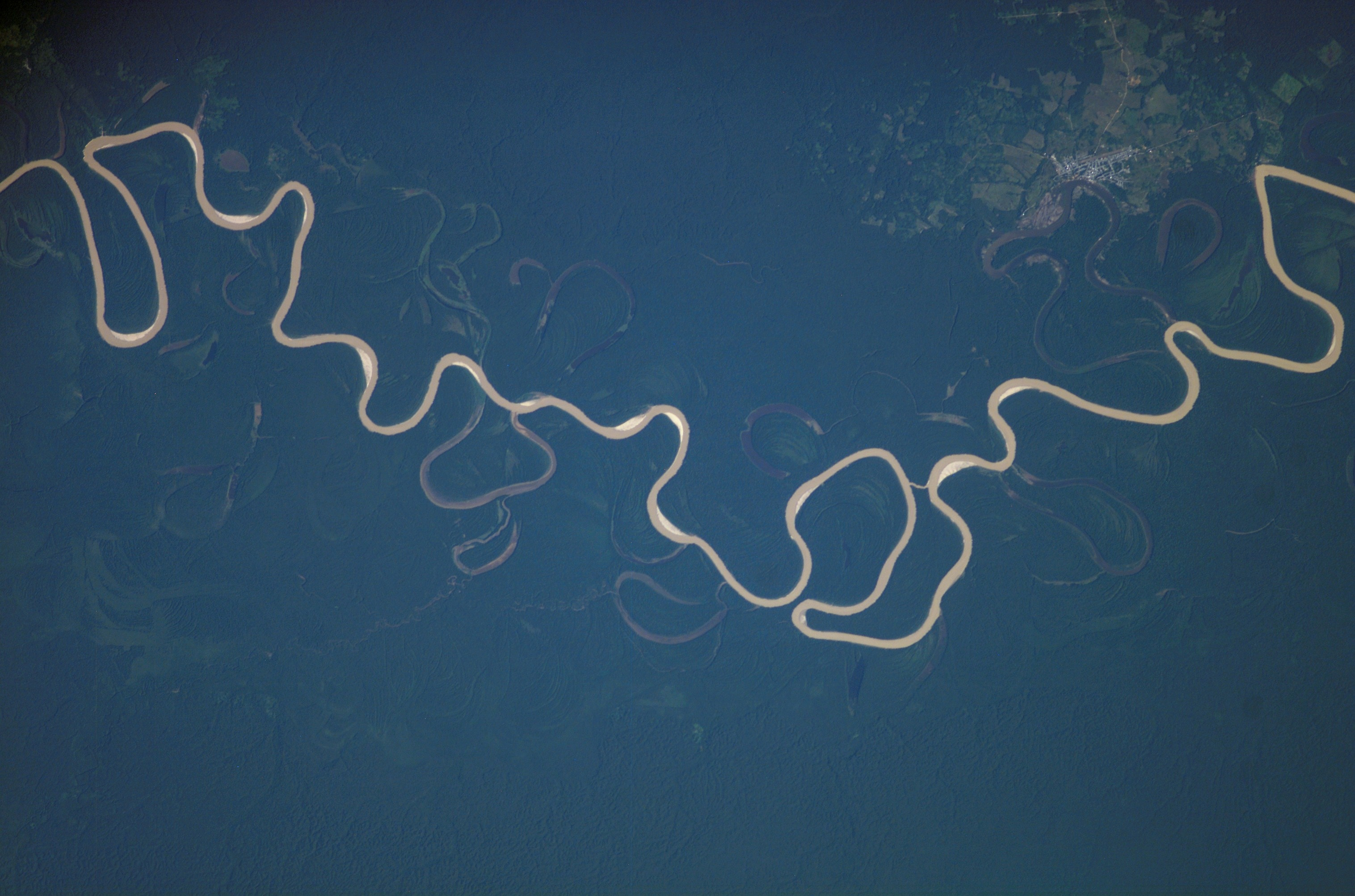
- Yuruá River taken from the International Space Station

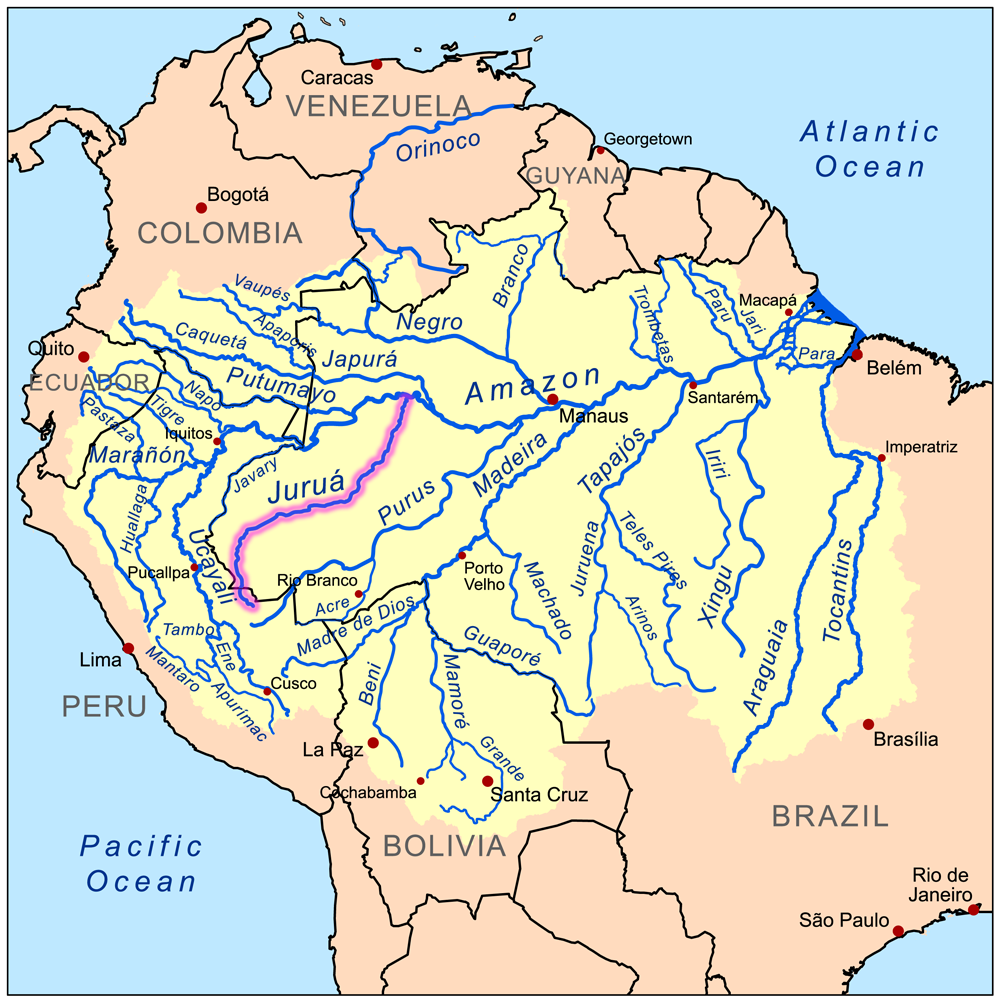
- Map of the Amazon Basin with the Juruá River highlighted

Location
- Country: Brazil, Peru

Physical characteristics
- Source
  - location: Ucayali Region, Peru
  - coordinates: 10°5′36.4776″S 72°11′56.4576″W
  - elevation: 377 m (1,237 ft)
- Mouth: Amazon River
  - coordinates: 2°38′9″S 65°45′22″W
  - elevation: 36 m (118 ft)
- Length: 2,682.29 km (1,666.70 mi) 3,283 km (2,040 mi)
- Basin size: 190,573 km^{2} (73,581 mi^{2})
- Discharge
  - location: Confluence of Solimões, Amazonas State (near mouth)
  - average: (Period: 1979–2015)6,004.1 m^{3}/s (212,030 cu ft/s) (Period: 1973–1990)6,600 m^{3}/s (230,000 cu ft/s) (Period: 1971–2000)6,662.1 m^{3}/s (235,270 cu ft/s)
- Discharge
  - location: Gavião, Amazonas State (Basin size: 163,859 km^{2} (63,266 sq mi)
  - average: (Period: 1979–2015)4,844 m^{3}/s (171,100 cu ft/s) (Period of data: 1970–1996)4,780 m^{3}/s (169,000 cu ft/s)
- Discharge
  - location: Cruzeiro do Sul, Acre State (Basin size: 38,537 km^{2} (14,879 sq mi)
  - average: (Period of data: 1970–1996)913 m^{3}/s (32,200 cu ft/s)

Basin features
- Progression: Amazon → Atlantic Ocean
- River system: Solimões
- Tributaries
  - left: Môa, Ipixuna
  - right: Gregório, Tarauaca, Xerua, Andirá

The Juruá River (Portuguese: Rio Juruá [ʒuɾuˈa]; Spanish: Río Yuruá) is a southern affluent river of the Amazon River west of the Purus River. The Juruá emerges from highlands in east-central Peru, then winds its way through lowlands in Brazil, sharing with this the bottom of the immense inland Amazon depression; and having all the characteristics of the Purus as regards curvature, sluggishness and general features of the low, half-flooded forest country it traverses.

For most of its length, the river flows through the Purus várzea ecoregion. This is surrounded by the Juruá-Purus moist forests ecoregion. The Juruá rises among the Ucayali highlands, and is navigable and unobstructed for a distance of 1,133 km (704 mi) above its junction with the Amazon. It has a total length of approximately 3,283 km (2,040 mi), and is one of the longest tributaries of the Amazon.

The 251,577-hectare (621,660-acre) Médio Juruá Extractive Reserve, created in 1997, is on the left bank of the river as it meanders in a generally northeast direction through the municipality of Carauari. The lower Juruá River forms the western boundary of the 187,982 hectares (464,510 acres) Baixo Juruá Extractive Reserve, created in 2001. Since 2018, the lower portion of the river in Brazil has been designated a protected Ramsar site.
