= Canutama =

Municipality of Amazonas, Brazil

- Municipality
- Flag

- Location of the municipality inside Amazonas

- Location in Brazil
- Coordinates: 6°32′2″S 64°22′58″W
- Country: Brazil
- Region: North
- State: Amazonas

Population (2020)
  - Total: 15,807
- Time zone: UTC−4 (AMT)

Canutama is a municipality located in the Brazilian state of Amazonas, considered third largest city of the Purus Medium after Lábrea and Tapauá.

Its population was 15,807 (2020) and its area is 29,820 km^{2}.

== Geography ==
=== Conservation ===
The municipality contains part of the strictly-protected Cuniã Ecological Station, an area of savannah parkland. The municipality contains most of the Balata-Tufari National Forest, a 1,079,670-hectare (2,667,900-acre) sustainable use conservation unit created in 2005. It contains part of the Mapinguari National Park, a 1,776,914-hectare (4,390,850-acre) conservation unit created in 2008. It also contains the 197,986-hectare (489,230-acre) Canutama Extractive Reserve, created in 2009. It contains 2% of the 881,704-hectare (2,178,740-acre) Tapauá State Forest, also created in 2009.

== History ==
During its beginning, it received some denominations: in 1874, it was established with the name of New Colony of Beautiful Sight, and in 1891, Ville of Our Lady of Nazare. From 1895 it only received the name for which today we know it: Canutama.
