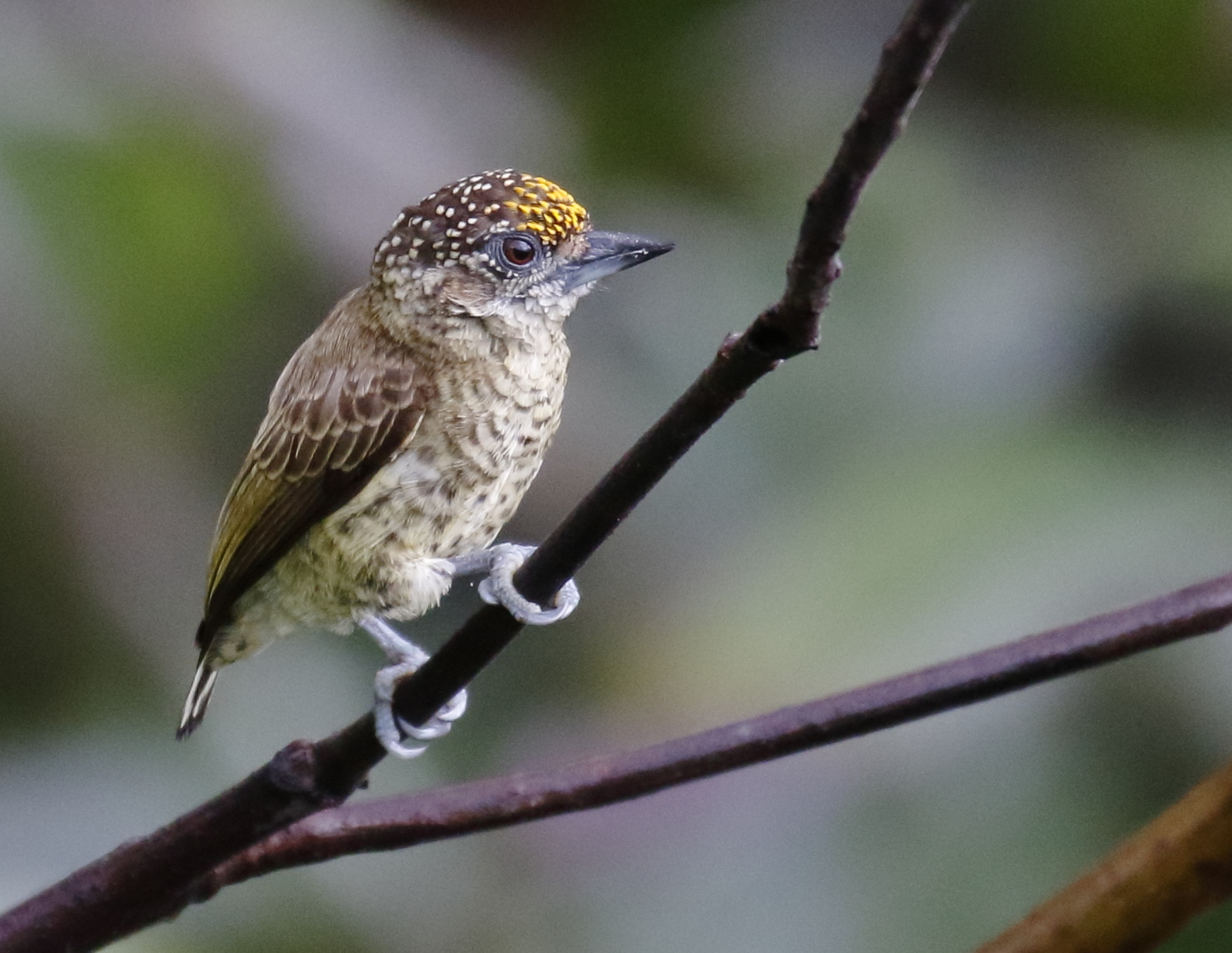
- A male bar-breasted piculet at Careiro da Várzea, Amazonas state, Brazil

Conservation status
- Least Concern (IUCN 3.1)

Scientific classification
- Kingdom: Animalia
- Phylum: Chordata
- Class: Aves
- Order: Piciformes
- Family: Picidae
- Genus: Picumnus
- Species: P. aurifrons

Binomial name
- Picumnus aurifrons Pelzeln, 1870

= Bar-breasted piculet =

Species of woodpecker

The bar-breasted piculet (Picumnus aurifrons) is a species of bird in subfamily Picumninae of the woodpecker family Picidae. It is found in Bolivia, Brazil, Colombia, and Peru.

== Taxonomy and systematics ==
The bar-breasted piculet has seven subspecies:

- P. a. aurifrons Pelzeln, 1870
- P. a. transfasciatus Hellmayr & Gyldenstolpe, 1937
- P. a. borbae Pelzeln, 1870
- P. a. wallacii Hargitt, 1889
- P. a. purusianus Todd, 1946
- P. a. flavifrons Hargitt, 1889
- P. a. juruanus Gyldenstolpe, 1941

Subspecies P. a. borbae and P. a. wallacii have at times been treated as individual species, with P. a. juruanus as a subspecies of borbae.

== Description ==
The bar-breasted piculet is the smallest extant species in the highly diverse woodpecker family. A typical adult is about 7.5 cm (3.0 in) long and weighs 8 to 10 g (0.28 to 0.35 oz). Males average 9.2 g (0.32 oz) and females 8.6 g (0.30 oz). Among standard measurements, their wing chord is 4.4 to 5.3 cm (1.7 to 2.1 in), their tail 2.3 to 2.6 cm (0.91 to 1.02 in), their beak 0.9 to 1.2 cm (0.35 to 0.47 in), and their tarsus 1.1 to 1.2 cm (0.43 to 0.47 in). Adult males of the nominate subspecies P. a. aurifrons have a black crown with yellow streaks on the forehead and white spots on the rest, and gray-brown cheeks with a whitish line behind the eye. Their upperparts are olive green. The upper surface of their tail is black; the innermost pair of feathers have whitish yellow inner webs and the outer two pairs have a whitish patch near the end. Their chin and throat are whitish with faint dark barring. Their underparts are yellowish white with brown barring on the breast, arrowhead-shaped marks on the sides of the breast and upper belly, and broad brown streaks on the flanks and lower belly. Adult females are identical but for white spots on their entire crown. Juveniles are similar to adults with a browner streaked (not spotted) crown and lighter streaking on the belly.

Subspecies P. a. purusianus has darker upperparts than the nominate and heavier, black, barring on the breast. P. a. flavifrons is similar to purusianus but has faint barring on the upperparts, less heavy breast barring, and a heavily spotted belly. P. a. wallacii has obscure barring on its upperparts and paler underparts with fainter streaking and more spots than the previous two. P. a. transfasciatus has heavy barring on its upperparts and breast. P. a. borbae has red streaks on its forehead and a yellower belly than the nominate with stronger black barring on the breast. P. a. juruanus has reddish orange streaks on its forehead but much weaker barring on its breast than borbae.

== Distribution and habitat ==
The bar-breasted piculet is a bird of the Amazon Basin. The subspecies are found thus:

- P. a. aurifrons, the Brazilian state of Mato Grosso between the Madeira and Tapajós rivers
- P. a. transfasciatus, Brazil between the Tapajós and Tocantins rivers
- P. a. borbae, Brazil between the Madeira and Tapajós rivers south of aurifrons
- P. a. wallacii, Brazil between the middle and lower Purus River and the lower Madeira River
- P. a. purusianus, Brazil along the upper Purus River
- P. a. flavifrons, northeastern Peru and western Brazil along the Solimões (Upper Amazon) River
- P. a. juruanus, eastern Peru, northern Bolivia, and western Brazil to the upper Juruá River

The South American Classification Committee of the American Ornithological Society extends the range of P. a. flavifrons into southeastern Colombia.

The bar-breasted piculet primarily inhabits the edges and clearings of humid tropical terra firme forest. It also occurs in várzea forest and secondary forest. In elevation it ranges from near sea level to 1,100 m (3,600 ft).

== Behavior ==
=== Movement ===
The bar-breasted piculet is believed to be a year-round resident throughout its range.

=== Feeding ===
Little is known about the bar-breasted piculet's foraging strategy, though it appears to prefer the upper canopy. Its diet has not been detailed; it is assumed to be insects and is known to include insect larvae.

=== Breeding ===
The bar-breasted piculet's breeding season appears to be from June to November. Nothing else is known about its breeding biology.

=== Vocalization ===
The bar-breasted piculet's call has been described as "tsirrrit-tsit-tsit" and "extr. high, very thin 'see-see-suw'."

== Status ==
The IUCN has assessed the bar-breasted piculet as being of Least Concern. It has an extremely large range but its population size is not known and is believed to be decreasing. No immediate threats have been identified. It seems "to be at best uncommon, but possibly overlooked." It occurs in at least two protected areas in Peru.
