= Açuã River =

- Location within Brazil
- Native name: Rio Açuã (Portuguese)

Location
- Country: Brazil

Physical characteristics
- Mouth
  - coordinates: 7.198679°S 64.191998°W

Basin features
- River system: Mucuim River

The Açuã River (Portuguese: Rio Açuã) is a river of Amazonas state in north-western Brazil, a tributary of the Mucuim River.

The river flows through the Mapinguari National Park, a 1,776,914 hectares (4,390,850 acres) conservation unit created in 2008. To the north of the national park it is crossed by the Trans-Amazonian Highway (BR-230), then runs through the Balata-Tufari National Forest, where it joins the Mucuim.

== See also ==
- List of rivers of Amazonas
