= Purus–Madeira moist forests =

Ecoregion in the Amazon biome

Purus-Madeira moist forests
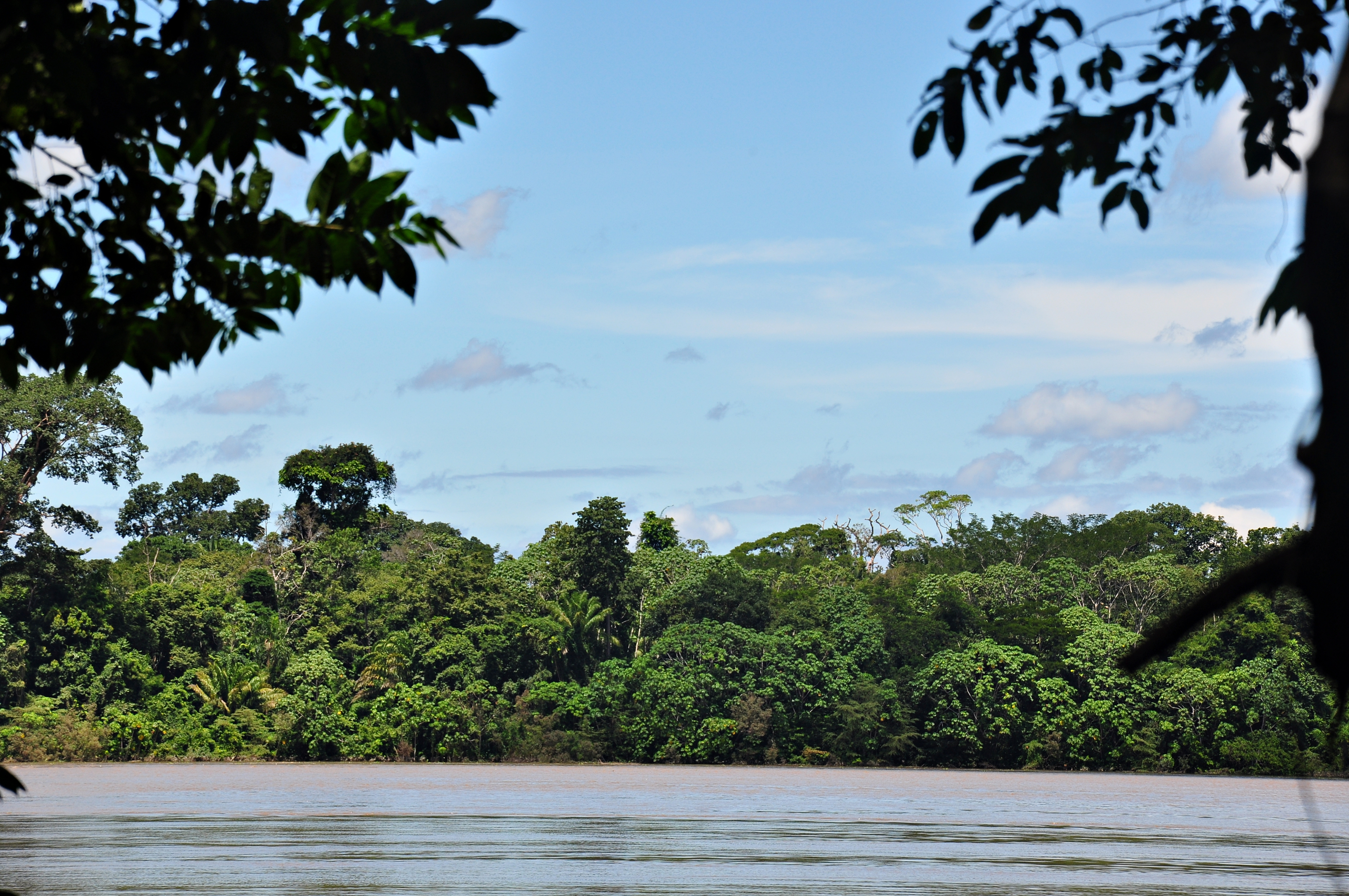
- Madeira River from the Mapinguari National Park

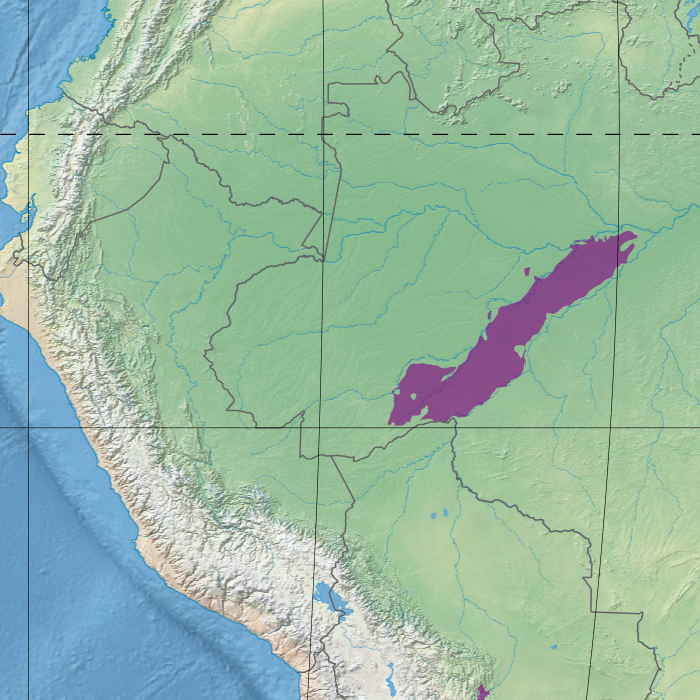
- Ecoregion territory (in purple)

Ecology
- Realm: Neotropical
- Biome: Tropical and subtropical moist broadleaf forests – Amazon

Geography
- Country: Brazil
- Coordinates: 5.724°S 62.472°W

The Purus-Madeira moist forests (NT0157) is an ecoregion in the central Amazon basin. It is part of the Amazon biome. The ecoregion covers a stretch of flat and relatively infertile land between the Purus and Madeira rivers, extending to the Solimões River (upper Amazon) in the north. It is isolated from other regions by the seasonally flooded várzea forest along these rivers, and has a high degree of endemism among its flora and fauna. The natural environment is relatively intact. The BR-319 highway was built along the length of the ecoregion in the early 1970s, but rapidly deteriorated and is now closed.

== Location ==
The Purus-Madeira moist forests ecoregion lies to the east of the Carauari arch, an ancient uplift zone in Brazil. The ecoregion stretches from southwest to northeast between the Purus River to the west and the Madeira River to the east, both tributaries of the Solimões River (upper Amazon). In the south it is crossed by the Igapó-Açu River, Ipixuna River, Itaparaná River, Mucuim River, and Jari River.

The large rivers that separate the ecoregion from surrounding regions prevent many species from migrating from or to other regions, making a distinctive environment with various endemic species. The Purus-Madeira moist forests are bounded by the Purus várzea ecoregion along the Purus and the Monte Alegre várzea along the Solimões and Madeira. The Madeira-Tapajós moist forests lie on the east shore of the Madeira. To the south there are stretches of Iquitos várzea in the Southwest Amazon moist forests.

== Physical ==
The ecoregion covers an almost entirely flat area of 17,404,720 hectares (43,008,000 acres) in the lower Amazon basin. The plain holds large meandering rivers that have formed many oxbow lakes, and a great many small streams, all subject to annual flooding. Elevations range from 20 to 60 metres (66 to 197 ft). It is within the low Amazon Basin, an area of soft sediments that emerged from five to two million years ago. Soils are acidic and low in nutrients, mostly sandy podzols or hydromorphic clay soils.

== Ecology ==
The ecoregion is in the Neotropical realm and the tropical and subtropical moist broadleaf forests biome.

=== Climate ===
The Köppen climate classification is "Am": equatorial, monsoonal. Average temperatures range from 21 to 32 °C (70 to 90 °F) with a mean of 27 °C (81 °F). Temperatures are fairly constant throughout the year. Average annual precipitation is 2,200 millimetres (87 in). Precipitation is lowest in July with an average of 32.8 millimetres (1.29 in) and highest in March with an average of 321.2 millimetres (12.65 in).

=== Flora ===
Most of the vegetation is seasonally flooded tropical lowland rainforest. The flora have high biodiversity and endemism. In the north the forest is dense with a canopy of 30 metres (98 ft) and emergent trees of up to 45 metres (148 ft). There is a dense understory. In the south the canopy is more open and the understory less dense. In the extreme south the moist forest meets patches of wooded savanna.

As with other forests of the Amazon basin the main families are Fabaceae, Sapotaceae, Lecythidaceae, Moraceae, Chrysobalanaceae, Lauraceae and Myristicaceae. The most common species are Eschweilera alba, Eschweilera odora, Pouteria guianensis, Vantanea guianensis, Ragala sanguinolenta, Licania apetala and Iryanthera ulei. Four common species of palm are Astrocaryum vulgare, Oenocarpus bataua, Attalea maripa, and Socratea exorrhiza. The palm-like Spathelia excelsa fruits once and then dies. Couma utilis provides edible fruit. The Physocalymma scaberrim is a typical emergent with red hardwood timber used in furniture.

=== Fauna ===
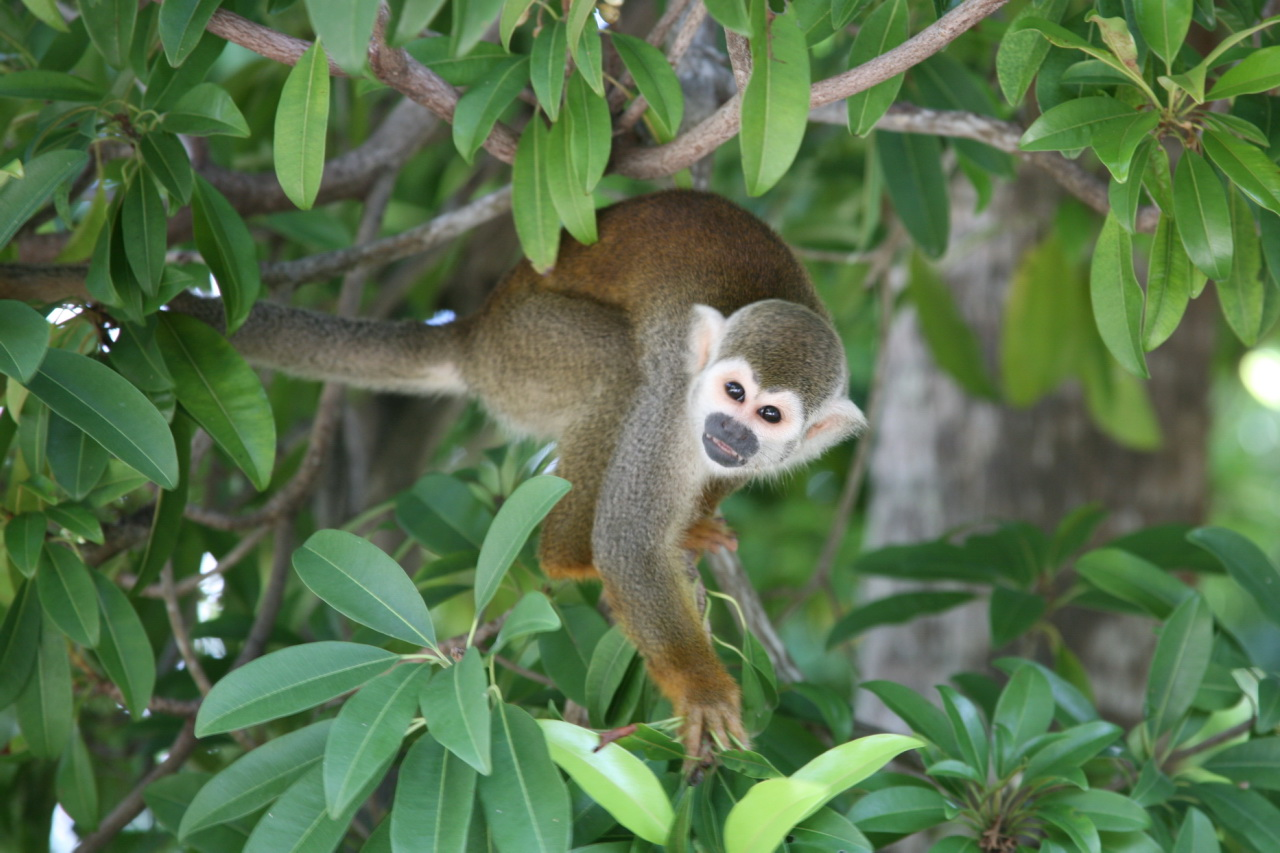
The bare-eared squirrel monkey (Saimiri ustus) is endemic.

There is diverse fauna with many endemic species. 165 species of mammals have been recorded, of which over 80 are bats. Primates include the bare-eared squirrel monkey (Saimiri ustus), white-fronted capuchin (Cebus albifrons), brown woolly monkey (Lagothrix lagotricha), and five species of titi monkey (Callicebus genus), of which Hershkovitz's titi (Callicebus dubius), ashy black titi (Callicebus cinerascens), and collared titi (Callicebus torquatus) are endemic. Other mammals include Hoffmann's two-toed sloth (Choloepus hoffmanni), brown-throated sloth (Bradypus variegatus), silky anteater (Cyclopes didactylus), southern tamandua (Tamandua tetradactyla), giant anteater (Myrmecophaga tridactyla), collared peccary (Pecari tajacu), jaguar (Panthera onca), cougar (Puma concolor), red brocket (Mazama americana), gray brocket (Mazama gouazoubira), and South American tapir (Tapirus terrestris). Endangered mammals include Peruvian spider monkey (Ateles chamek), white-cheeked spider monkey (Ateles marginatus) and giant otter (Pteronura brasiliensis).

Green iguana (Iguana iguana) and tegus lizards (genus Tupinambis) are common. Snakes include fer-de-lance (Bothrops asper), palm pit-vipers (genus Bothriechis), coral snakes (genus Micrurus), bushmasters (Lachesis muta) and boa constrictors (Boa constrictor).

572 species of birds have been recorded including migrant toucan (genus Ramphastos), Amazon parrot (genus Amazona), and macaw (genus Ara). Resident birds included tanagers (genera Tangara and Tachyphonus), woodcreepers (genus Xiphorhynchus), resplendent quetzal (Pharomachrus mocinno), 15 species of curassows (genera Crax, Nothocrax, Mitu and Pauxi), and tinamous (genera Crypturellus and Tinamus). Endangered birds include wattled curassow (Crax globulosa) and red-necked aracari (Pteroglossus bitorquatus).

=== Status ===
The World Wildlife Fund classes the ecoregion as "Relatively Stable/Intact". Most of the environment is undamaged, apart from the south. A paved road (BR-319) was built along the length of the region from Humaitá to Manaus, but it proved impossible to maintain and was closed. The Trans-Amazonian Highway crosses the southwestern end of the region from Humaitá to Lábrea and has caused deforestation to create pasturage and agricultural fields. The southern area is threatened by controlled and uncontrolled fires. Mining in the upper sections of the Purus and Madeira rivers causes pollution and habitat destruction. During the period from 2004 to 2011 the ecoregion experienced an annual rate of habitat loss of 0.32%. Global warming will force tropical species to migrate uphill to find areas with suitable temperature and rainfall. Low, flat ecoregions such as the Purus-Madeira moist forests are extremely vulnerable.

== Sources ==
- Coca-Castro, Alejandro; Reymondin, Louis; Bellfield, Helen; Hyman, Glenn (January 2013), Land use Status and Trends in Amazonia (PDF), Amazonia Security Agenda Project, archived from the original (PDF) on 2016-03-19
- Feeley, Kenneth J.; Rehm, Evan (2013), Amazon’s vulnerability to climate change heightened by deforestation and man-made dispersal barriers (PDF), Miami, FL: Florida International University
- "Purus-Madeira moist forests", Global Species, Myers Enterprises II
- Sears, Robin, Northern South America: Northwestern Brazil (NT0157), WWF: World Wildlife Fund
- WildFinder, WWF: World Wildlife Fund
