= Lago do Cuniã Extractive Reserve =

Protected area in Rondônia, Brazil

- Reserva Extrativista Lago do Cuniã
- IUCN category VI (protected area with sustainable use of natural resources)
- Location within Brazil
- Nearest city: Porto Velho, Rondônia
- Coordinates: 8°18′21″S 63°29′26″W
- Area: 55,850 hectares (138,000 acres)
- Designation: Extractive reserve
- Created: 10 November 1999
- Administrator: Chico Mendes Institute for Biodiversity Conservation

The Lago do Cuniã Extractive Reserve (Portuguese: Reserva Extrativista Lago do Cuniã) is an extractive reserve in the state of Rondônia, Brazil.

== Location ==
Conservation units in the Purus-Madeira interfluvial.: 22. Lago do Cuniã Extractive Reserve

The Lago do Cuniã Extractive Reserve is in the municipality of Porto Velho, Rondônia. It has an area of 55,850 hectares (138,000 acres). The reserve is on the left (west) bank of the Madeira River. It adjoins the Cuniã Ecological Station to the east and north and the Rio Madeira Sustainable Yield Forest (Floresta de Rendimento Sustentado) to the north and west.

The reserve contains the floodplains of large and small rivers, surrounded by fluvial terraces. The relief is one of soft, rounded hills. Altitude ranges from 83 to 140 metres (272 to 459 ft). The reserve drains into the Madeira River. The Cuniã Lake (Lago do Cuniã), after which the reserve is named, has an area of about 18,000 hectares (44,000 acres) and is fed by stream originating in the reserve.

== Environment ==
Temperatures range from 16 to 34 °C (61 to 93 °F) with an average of 26 °C (79 °F). Average annual rainfall is 2,250 millimetres (89 in). The vegetation is mainly savanna-rainforest contact and pioneer fluvial forest. The reserve has rich fauna, with birds like great egret (Ardea alba), jabiru (Jabiru mycteria), maguari stork (Ciconia maguari) and Neotropic cormorant (Phalacrocorax brasilianus) and large animals such as black caiman (Melanosuchus niger) and porpoise. As of 2001 the reserve was home to 50 families with about 400 people whose main economic activity was fishing for food and for sale. Almost all preserve traditional artisan techniques, including the skill learned from the Indians of making canoes.

== History ==
The Lago do Cuniã Extractive Reserve was created by federal decree 3.238 of 10 November 1999, which was reworded on 9 May 2000. It is classed as IUCN protected area category VI (protected area with sustainable use of natural resources). Its basic objectives are to protect the livelihoods and culture of the traditional population and ensure the sustainable use of the natural resources. It is administered by the Chico Mendes Institute for Biodiversity Conservation (ICMBio). On 22 February 2002 lower limits were placed on fishing related to minimum size and period of fishing. The deliberative council was created on 20 June 2006.

An ordinance of 9 January 2012 provided for a consistent and integrated approach to preparing management plans for the conservation units in the BR-319 area of influence. These are the Abufari Biological Reserve, Cuniã Ecological Station, Nascentes do Lago Jari and Mapinguari national parks, Balata-Tufari, Humaitá and Iquiri national forests, and the Lago do Capanã-Grande, Rio Ituxi, Médio Purus and Lago do Cuniã extractive reserves. The usage plan of the reserve was approved on 10 July 2013.

== Sources ==
- RESEX do Lago do Cuniã (in Portuguese), ISA: Instituto Socioambiental
- Resex Lago do Cuniã (in Portuguese), ICMBio: Chico Mendes Institute for Biodiversity Conservation
- Unidade de Conservação: Reserva Extrativista Lago do Cuniã (in Portuguese), MMA: Ministério do Meio Ambiente
