= Ipixuna River (Purus River tributary) =

River in Amazonas, Brazil

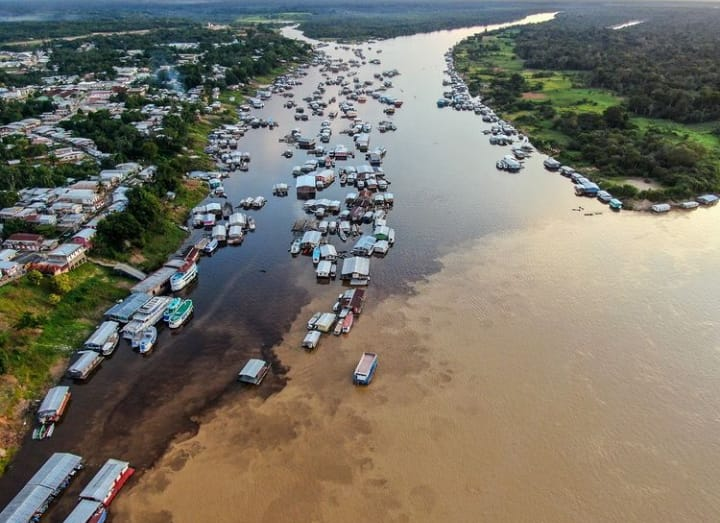

- Location within Brazil
- Native name: Rio Ipixuna (Portuguese)

Location
- Country: Brazil

Physical characteristics
- Mouth
  - location: Tapauá, Amazonas
  - coordinates: 5.625987°S 63.192708°W
- Length: 370 kilometres (230 mi)

Basin features
- River system: Purus River

The Ipixuna River (Portuguese: Rio Ipixuna) or Paranápixuna River is a river of Amazonas state in north-western Brazil. It is a tributary of the Purus River. The confluence of these two rivers is at Tapauá.

The Ipixuna River flows from south to north through the 881,704 hectares (2,178,740 acres) Tapauá State Forest, created in 2009, before joining the Purus river from the right at Tapauá. The river flows through the Purus-Madeira moist forests ecoregion in its upper reaches. It flows through the Purus várzea ecoregion before joining the Purus.

== See also ==
- List of rivers of Amazonas

== Sources ==
- FES Tapauá (in Portuguese), ISA: Instituto Socioambiental
- Sears, Robin, Northern South America: Northwestern Brazil (NT0157), WWF: World Wildlife Fund
- Ziesler, R.; Ardizzone, G.D. (1979), "Amazon River System", The Inland waters of Latin America, Food and Agriculture Organization of the United Nations, ISBN 92-5-000780-9, archived from the original on 21 October 2013
