= Pyrenula celaticarpa =

Scientific classification
- Kingdom: Fungi
- Division: Ascomycota
- Class: Eurotiomycetes
- Order: Pyrenulales
- Family: Pyrenulaceae
- Genus: Pyrenula
- Species: P. celaticarpa

Binomial name
- Pyrenula celaticarpa Aptroot & M.Cáceres (2014)
- Holotype: Serra de Itabaiana National Park, Brazil

Species of lichen

Pyrenula celaticarpa is a species of corticolous (bark-dwelling), crustose lichen in the family Pyrenulaceae. Found in Brazil, this species is notable for its deeply immersed ascomata (fruiting bodies) with distinctive red ostioles (openings). The ascospores (spores produced in the asci) are 3-septate, meaning they are divided into four sections, and measure 21–24 μm by 10–11 μm.

The type specimen of Pyrenula celaticarpa was collected from Parque Nacional Serra de Itabaiana in Areia Branca, Sergipe, Brazil, at an elevation of about 250 m (820 ft). The thallus (main body of the lichen) is rather thick, measuring 0.1–0.2 mm, olive green, and minutely cracked throughout. It lacks pseudocyphellae, which are tiny pores, and does not have a prothallus, a thin border around the thallus. The ascomata are pyriform (pear-shaped), 0.6–0.9 mm in diameter, and deeply immersed in the bark beneath the thallus, with a carbonised (blackened) wall. The ostioles are usually red-brown to red, occasionally pale brown or almost black, and can be flush or distinctly convex. The hamathecium, the tissue between the asci, contains hyaline (translucent) oil droplets. The ascospores are dark brown, irregularly arranged in the asci, and have diamond-shaped internal cavities separated from the wall by a thick layer.

Pyrenula celaticarpa does not have pycnidia (small asexual fruiting bodies). Chemically, the ostiole reacts with potassium hydroxide (K+) to produce a crimson colour due to an unidentified anthraquinone compound. The thallus reacts with K+ to produce an orange-brown colour and does not fluoresce under ultraviolet light.

Pyrenula celaticarpa grows on smooth bark in undisturbed Atlantic rainforests and is only known to occur in Brazil. This species is distinguished by its deeply immersed ascomata, which are only visible by the red or brown ostioles, and its unusual orange-brown thallus reaction. It is part of a group of anthraquinone-containing species around the type species Pyrenula nitida. Similar species include P. rubsrostoma and P. rubrostigma, both of which have superficial, conical ascomata.

== See also ==
- List of Pyrenula species
