= Pyrenula rubrostigma =

Scientific classification
- Kingdom: Fungi
- Division: Ascomycota
- Class: Eurotiomycetes
- Order: Pyrenulales
- Family: Pyrenulaceae
- Genus: Pyrenula
- Species: P. rubrostigma

Binomial name
- Pyrenula rubrostigma Aptroot & M.Cáceres (2013)
- Holotype: Cuniã Ecological Station, Brazil

Species of lichen-forming fungus

Pyrenula rubrostigma is a species of corticolous (bark-dwelling) crustose lichen in the family Pyrenulaceae. The species is readily identified by its distinctive bright red apical opening on the fruiting bodies, caused by an anthraquinone pigment that turns purple when treated with potassium hydroxide solution. It forms a thin olive-brown crust on smooth bark in lowland rainforests and is widely distributed across several Brazilian states.

== Taxonomy ==
This species was described as new by André Aptroot and Marcela Cáceres in 2013. The holotype was gathered from the Cuniã Ecological Station in Rondônia, Brazil, (km 760 on federal highway BR-319 north of Porto Velho), from tree bark in lowland primary rainforest.

== Description ==
This species forms a thin, olive‑brown crust with a smooth surface and is outlined by a narrow black line. Its fruiting bodies (perithecia) are conical and somewhat flattened, 0.6–1.2 mm in diameter, and occur singly. The apical opening is bright red because of an anthraquinone pigment that gives a purple reaction with potassium hydroxide (KOH) solution. The hamathecium contains numerous tiny colorless oil globules. Each ascus bears eight ascospores arranged in two irregular rows. The spores have three cross‑walls (septa) and measure 15–18 μm long and 6–7 μm wide. Their internal cavities are rounded to angular and often slightly wider than long; a thickened inner wall occurs at the tips, and distinct dark cross‑lines sometimes separate the chambers. Asexual reproductive bodies are absent in P. rubrostigma.

== Habitat and distribution ==
Pyrenula rubrostigma is corticolous and grows on smooth bark. It is widely distributed in Brazil, having been recorded from the states of Rondônia, Pará, Alagoas, Sergipe, Bahia, and Mato Grosso do Sul.

== See also ==
- List of Pyrenula species
