= Balata-Tufari National Forest =

National forest in Amazonas, Brazil

- Floresta Nacional de Balata-Tufari
- IUCN category VI (protected area with sustainable use of natural resources)
- Location within Brazil
- Nearest city: Humaitá, Amazonas
- Coordinates: 6.981°S 63.838°W
- Area: 1,079,669.71 hectares (2,667,922.0 acres)
- Designation: National forest
- Created: 17 February 2005
- Administrator: Chico Mendes Institute for Biodiversity Conservation

The Balata-Tufari National Forest (Portuguese: Floresta Nacional de Balata-Tufari) is a national forest in the state of Amazonas, Brazil. It was created to support sustainable extraction of forest products such as timber subject to restrictions and regulations defined by law or the responsible agency, ICMBio.

== Location ==
Conservation units in the Purus-Madeira interfluvial.: 8. Balata-Tufari National Forest

The Balata-Tufari National Forest covers parts of the municipalities of Canutama (90.85%) and Tapauá (9.15%) in the state of Amazonas. It has an area of 1,079,669.71 hectares (2,667,922.0 acres). It is bounded by the Purus River to the west, by the first section of the Trans-Amazonian Highway (BR-230) from Lábrea to Humaitá which cuts across its southern end, and by BR-319 to the east. The Mucuim River runs through the forest, flowing north from the Mapinguari National Park, which lies to the south of BR-230. The Mucuim is joined within the forest by the Açuã River, which rises in the Mapinguari National Park. 2.47% of the national forest's area overlaps with the Mapinguari National Park.

The national forest is in the Amazon biome. It contains 91.44% open rainforest, 6.45% dense rainforest and 2.11% contact between savannah and rainforest. About 2000 families live in the forest, mostly farmers who own or lease small plots. The Balata-Tufari National Forest and the nearby Iquiri National Forest have great potential not only for sustainable extraction of timber but also for products such as oils, resins, nuts, seeds and fruits.

== History ==
The Balata-Tufari National Forest was created by decree on 17 February 2005 and is administered by the Chico Mendes Institute for Biodiversity Conservation (ICMBio). It is classed as IUCN protected area category VI (protected area with sustainable use of natural resources) with the objective of sustainable multiple use of forest resources and scientific research, with emphasis on methods for sustainable exploitation of native forests. The forest had three areas when created: Gleba Balata with 282,781 hectares (698,770 acres), Gleba Tufari with 360,168 hectares (889,990 acres) and Gleba Jacaré with 159,074 hectares (393,080 acres). On 8 May 2008 a fourth area was added, Area 4 with 275,836 hectares (681,610 acres).

The advisory council was formed on 14 December 2010. An ordinance of 9 January 2012 provided for a consistent and integrated approach to preparing management plans for the conservation units in the BR-319 area of influence. These are the Abufari Biological Reserve, Cuniã Ecological Station, Nascentes do Lago Jari and Mapinguari national parks, Balata-Tufari, Humaitá and Iquiri national forests, and the Lago do Capanã-Grande, Rio Ituxi, Médio Purus and Lago do Cuniã extractive reserves.

== Sources ==
- Flona de Balata-Tufari (in Portuguese), Chico Mendes Institute for Biodiversity Conservation, archived from the original on 2019-10-15
- FLONA de Balata-Tufari (in Portuguese), ISA: Instituto Socioambiental
- Flona de Balata-Tufari Mapa Interativo (in Portuguese), ICMBio, archived from the original on 2019-10-15
- FLONA do Iquiri (in Portuguese), ISA: Instituto Socioambiental
- Unidade de Conservação: Floresta Nacional de Balata-Tufari (in Portuguese), MMA: Ministério do Meio Ambiente
