= Marúbo people =

Indigenous people of Brazil

Marubo
Total population
- 1700

Regions with significant populations
- Vale do Javari

Languages
- Marubo, Portuguese

Religion
- Animism, Catholicism, Evangelical Christianity

The Marúbo people are an indigenous group who primarily inhabit the western Amazon rainforest in Brazil.

== Region ==
The Marubo live in the far west of Brazil, in the Vale do Javari Indigenous Territory, an area covering 83,000 square kilometres (32,000 sq mi).

Access to the Vale do Javari Indigenous Territory is limited by the government of Brazil to protect the indigenous groups inhabiting the area and the environment on which they depend for their traditional lifeways from exploitation by loggers, miners, poachers, drug traffickers and others. Several other indigenous peoples live in this territory, including the Kanamari and the Tsohom Djapa, who speak languages in the Katukina family, the Matis, the Kulina Pano, the Korubo and the Matses or Mayoruna, who speak Panoan languages like the Marubo. The region is also home to certain other groups of uncontacted peoples. Contact with uncontacted peoples is prohibited by the government of Brazil, even with respect to other indigenous groups living traditional lifeways, but state capacity is low in these areas and monitoring or enforcement is difficult.

== History ==
The origins of the Marúbo people are not definitively documented, but according to Marúbo tradition, their language originated from the Chaináwavo, a now-extinct subgroup of the Marúbo. This suggests significant cultural interaction between the Chaináwavo and other Marúbo subgroups in the past, and implies that the Marúbo may have developed from several tribes converging culturally or one tribe dispersing and diversifying over time.

The Marúbo were first contacted in the early 20th century by Peruvians looking to harvest latex from local trees. When many Brazilian rubber workers came over during the Amazon Rubber Boom the Marúbo suffered greatly due to contact with new diseases. During this time they were also forced into debt by local rubber barons being forced to trade local resources for outside technologies. This gave them a technological edge over the other tribes because they were the first to have access to guns. During this time many social and religious norms were uprooted in order to get more rubber and the majority of the Marúbo were involved in the rubber industry. By the times the rubber industry crashed in 1912 the Marúbo were nearly extinct, though the rubber industry did not totally disappear until 1938.

After the rubber industry left, the Marúbo returned to their previous isolation. During this time a local chief named João Tuxaua managed to get the various subgroups of Marúbo to make peace and stop fighting, and aside from this the Marúbo underwent large societal and political change. They became a confederation of independent tribes unified into one larger whole. By sometime in the 1940s as the Marúbo began to run out of metal tools they began to explore in search of the outside world. They traveled south along the Juruá river when at the mouth of the Ipixuna river they made contact with the Boa Fé rubber plantation. They began to trade animal pelts and raw rubber for industrial products. Soon after Brazilian missionaries began to convert the Marúbo and loggers made contracts with the Marúbo.

During the 1960s the Jaravi valley had little rule of law and native tribes often skirmished. Sometime around 1960, a group of Mayoruna attacked a group of Marúbo gathering turtle eggs, killing a man and abducting three women. The Marúbo retaliated with a raid on a Mayoruna village which supposedly killed 14 Mayoruna with the help of firearms. After this the Brazilian government stepped in to maintain order and a few years later the Mayoruna were convinced by some foreigners to return two of the women, though one did not return, having either died or assimilated.

== Language ==
The Marubo speak a Panoan language. According to the Marúbo their language originated with the Chaináwavo before spreading to the other subgroups, though linguists find this controversial.

The main language of the Marúbo is the Marúbo language, but this language is considered threatened due to encroachment by Portuguese. Due to historical contact with Peru, many older Marúbo people have some knowledge of Spanish and Quechua. However, in more recent times, Brazil has become the main point of contact with the outside world for the Marúbo. As a result, most young men have learned Portuguese, though fewer young women have done so. The Marúbo also have a special variety of their language which is only used during special rituals.

The name "Marubo" is an exonym, but it is accepted by the Marubo. There is no known name that the Marubo have for themselves.

Like other tribes in the region, Marubo individuals often have different names within the tribe and for use with the outside world.

== Culture ==
=== Construction ===
The Marúbo live in communal huts called Malocas which are always in the center of their villages. The Malocas are inhabited by several nuclear families and an owner. Each wife and her children live in a roughly 9 square meter area marked with posts where they cook and sleep and the husbands may stay with one of their wives switching periodically. Inside the Malocas there are two benches where the men eat their two daily meals, one before work and one after. The woman will eat these meals on mats in the center of the room where there is also a trough where the woman crush grains. On the outskirts of their villages they have several store houses used for storing materials such as tools, machines, clothing etc.

=== Diet ===
The Marubo hunt a variety of animals with bows and arrows (though this is becoming less common) and shotguns. The Marúbo often hunt with firearms targeting spider monkeys, woolly monkeys, collared peccaries and occasionally tapir white-lipped peccaries, paca, piping guan and curassow. They also practice hook and line fishing. The Marúbo also trap monkeys and keep them as pets.

The Marubo cultivate maize, banana, manioc, papaya, guava, nettles and cotton.

They drink a saliva-fermented beverage called Caisuma.

=== Economic activities ===
In Marúbo society, women have various responsibilities such as tending to swiddens (agricultural plots), cooking, harvesting bananas and manioc, and engaging in body painting. They also craft beads, hammocks, and clothing. From May to September, the Marúbo harvest latex from trees, while the remainder of the year is dedicated to timber harvesting. These products are sold illegally either to river merchants for profit or directly to local towns. The Marúbo purchase goods from a store operated by missionaries within their community.

=== Societal divisions ===
The Marúbo are divided into 18 clans which pass through matrilineal decent. With the daughter of a mother in clan X becoming part of clan Y and her children rejoining clan X. The Marúbo practice polygamy where a man may marry one or more of his wife's sisters. The Maloca are divided into many groups based on which Maloca they live in but these groups recently have begun to coalesce into larger groups. These larger groups are the ones which interact with the outside world and have designated leaders and Portuguese names.

There are several age distinctions among the Marúbo. Only married men over the age of thirty can take tobacco, snuff, or ayahuasca. In general, younger men are viewed and treated as subservient to older men.

== Religion ==
The Marúbo take ayahuasca in order to connect with the forest. They take both snuff and ayahuasca during Shamanic rituals.
