= Ituxi Extractive Reserve =

Extractive reserve in Amazonas, Brazil

- Reserva Extrativista Ituxi
- IUCN category VI (protected area with sustainable use of natural resources)
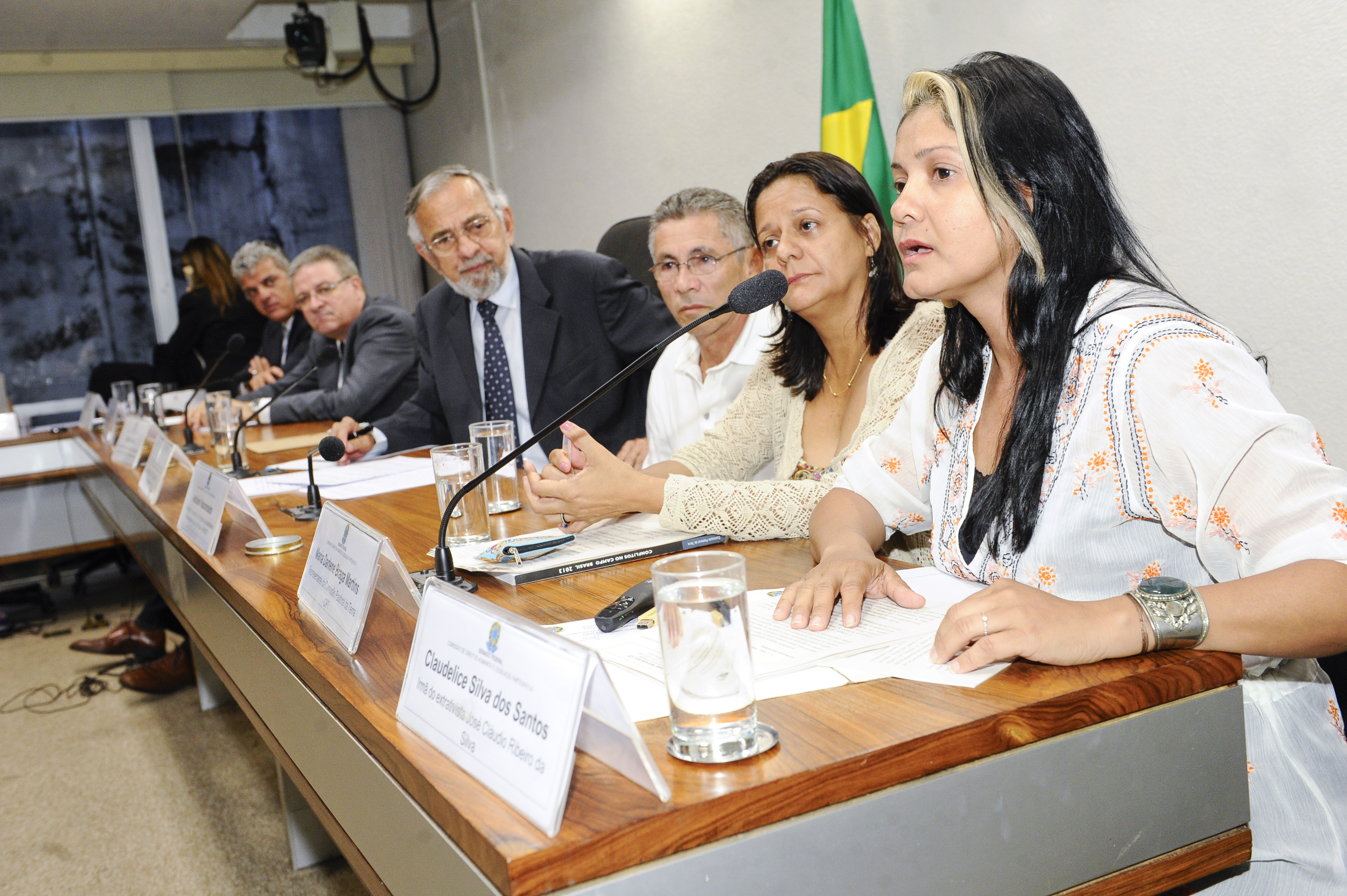
- Claudelice Silva dos Santos of the Association of Agroextractive Producers of the Assembly of God of Ituxi River (Apadriti) speaking on 3 September 2014 at a hearing on violence against socio-environmental activists

- Location within Brazil
- Nearest city: Lábrea, Amazonas
- Coordinates: 8.265744°S 65.186914°W
- Area: 776,940 hectares (1,919,900 acres)
- Designation: Extractive reserve
- Created: 5 June 2008
- Administrator: Chico Mendes Institute for Biodiversity Conservation

The Ituxi Extractive Reserve (Portuguese: Reserva Extrativista Ituxi) is an extractive reserve in the state of Amazonas, Brazil.

== Location ==
Conservation units in the Purus-Madeira interfluvial.: 2. Ituxi Extractive Reserve

The Ituxi Extractive Reserve is in the municipality of Lábrea, Amazonas. It has an area of 776,940 hectares (1,919,900 acres). The reserve in on the banks of Ituxi River, a blackwater river, and its tributaries, the Punicici, Ciriquiqui and Curequetê. The Ituxi River, a tributary of the Purus River, flows through the reserve in a northeast direction. The reserve is bounded by the Mapinguari National Park to the south and east and the Iquiri National Forest to the west and north.

== Environment ==
Vegetation includes terra firma forest, seasonally flooded várzea forest, clearings and capoeira (scrub), with great biological diversity. Plant species include Geissospermum laeve, Parkia pendula, Brazil nut (Bertholletia excelsa) and copaiba (Copaifera multijuga). The reserve has many endemic fish species.

== Economy ==
There are about 500 people in 20 extractive communities. These communities include Mangutiari, Goiaba, Pedreiras do Amazonas, Praia Alta, Floresta, Cabeçudo, Estirão da Pedreira, Vila Canaã, Vila Vitória, Capurana, Curequetê, Carajuriã, São Luis, Paumapi, Punicici, Ciriquiqui, Vera, Nova Esperança and Pacu. The families extract fruit, oils and other seasonal products such as Brazil nuts, natural rubber, copaiba, açaí palm fruit and vines. Fishing in the lakes and flooded forests provides an important source of food and income for the residents.

== History ==
The Ituxi Extractive Reserve was created by federal decree on 5 June 2008 with an area of about 776,940 hectares (1,919,900 acres). IT is administered by the Chico Mendes Institute for Biodiversity Conservation (ICMBio). It is classed as IUCN protected area category VI (protected area with sustainable use of natural resources). The purpose is to protect the livelihoods and ensure use and conservation of natural resources traditionally used by the communities in the reserve. On 18 September 2008 INCRA recognised the reserve as supporting 300 families of small farmers, who would be eligible for PRONAF support. The deliberative council of the reserve was created on 4 November 2010.

An ordinance of 9 January 2012 established a joint planning process for conservation units in the BR-319 area of influence, which are the Abufari Biological Reserve, Cuniã Ecological Station, Nascentes do Lago Jari National Park, Mapinguari National Park, Balata-Tufari National Forest, Humaitá National Forest, Iquiri National Forest, Lago do Capanã-Grande Extractive Reserve, Ituxi Extractive Reserve, Médio Purus Extractive Reserve and Lago do Cuniã Extractive Reserve.

In July 2012 ICMBio arranged a three-day workshop in the Floresta community in the reserve, supported by a representative of the Tropical Forest Institute and others. Objectives included giving the residents an update on progress in preparing the community forest management plan, and informing the residents about the business plan for commercializing wood. The institutes had entered a partnership with the Association of Agroextractive Producers of the Assembly of God of Ituxi River to prepare a training plan for forest management. The Sustainable Forestry Management Plan was approved in June 2014, covering an area of 1,400 hectares (3,500 acres) divided into ten units of annual production. Sustainable logging is allowed in the reserve as an alternative source of income. All wood must be certified under the DOF system operated by the Brazilian Institute of Environment and Renewable Natural Resources (IBAMA).

As of 2016 the Ituxi Extractive Reserve was supported by the Amazon Region Protected Areas Program.

== Sources ==
- Full list: PAs supported by ARPA, ARPA
- Marcelo Franco (30 July 2012), Seminário discutiu manejo florestal comunitário na Resex Ituxi em Lábrea/AM (in Portuguese), IEB - Instituto Internacional de Educação do Brasil, archived from the original on 2016-09-17
- RESEX do Lago do Capanã Grande (in Portuguese), ISA: Instituto Socioambiental
- Resex Ituxi (in Portuguese), ICMBio: Chico Mendes Institute for Biodiversity Conservation, archived from the original on 2016-08-22
- RESEX Ituxi (in Portuguese), ISA: Instituto Socioambiental
- Samuel Simões Neto (2 October 2014), Moradores da Resex Ituxi recebem do ICMBio Autorização de Exploração Florestal (in Portuguese), Rede Florestal do Amazonas
- Unidade de Conservação: Reserva Extrativista Ituxi (in Portuguese), MMA: Ministério do Meio Ambiente
