= Nascentes do Lago Jari National Park =

National park in Amazonas, Brazil

- Parque Nacional Nascentes do Lago Jari
- IUCN category II (national park)
- Location within Brazil
- Nearest city: Tapauá - State of Amazonas
- Coordinates: 5°42′18″S 62°32′38″W
- Area: 812,745.18 hectares (2,008,337.1 acres)
- Designation: National park
- Created: 8 May 2008
- Administrator: Chico Mendes Institute for Biodiversity Conservation

Nascentes do Lago Jari National Park (Portuguese: Parque Nacional Nascentes do Lago Jari) is a national park in the state of Amazonas, Brazil. It protects an area of Amazon rainforest in the BR-319 highway area of influence.

== Location ==
Conservation units in the Purus-Madeira interfluvial.: 10. Nascentes do Lago Jari National Park

The Nascentes do Lago Jari National Park has an area of 812,745.18 hectares (2,008,337.1 acres). The park is in the Amazon biome. The park covers an area west of the BR-319 highway and east of the Purus River, to the south of Lago Jari and to the south west of the Matupiri State Park. About 6% of the park is in the Beruri municipality and 94% in the Tapauá municipality, both of the state of Amazonas.

The park protects the basin of the Jari River, an important right tributary of the Purus in its middle course, as well as the natural resources and associated fish. It is part of an important ecological corridor in the region between the Purus and Madeira rivers in combination with the Apurinã do Igarapé Tauamirim Indigenous Territory, Abufari Biological Reserve and Piagaçu-Purus Sustainable Development Reserve on the Purus River and the Lago do Capanã Grande Extractive Reserve, Rio Amapá Sustainable Development Reserve and the Matupiri State Park near the Madeira.

== History ==
The Nascentes do Lago Jari National Park was created by decree on 8 May 2008 and is administered by the Chico Mendes Institute for Biodiversity Conservation (ICMBio). An advisory council was created on 16 April 2012. An ordinance of 9 January 2012 provided for a consistent and integrated approach to preparing management plans for the conservation units in the BR-319 area of influence. These are the Abufari Biological Reserve, Cuniã Ecological Station, Nascentes do Lago Jari and Mapinguari national parks, Balata-Tufari, Humaitá and Iquiri national forests, and the Lago do Capanã-Grande, Rio Ituxi, Médio Purus and Lago do Cuniã extractive reserves. The conservation unit is supported by the Amazon Region Protected Areas Program.

== Sources ==
- FLONA do Iquiri (in Portuguese), ISA: Instituto Socioambiental
- Full list: PAs supported by ARPA, ARPA
- Mapa Interativo (in Portuguese), ICMBio, archived from the original on 2016-08-17
- Parna Nascentes do Lago Jari (in Portuguese), Chico Mendes Institute for Biodiversity Conservation, archived from the original on 2021-03-02
- PARNA Nascentes do Lago Jari (in Portuguese), ISA: Instituto Socioambiental
