= Rio Madeira Sustainable Yield Forest =

Set of managed forests in Rondônia, Brazil

- Floresta de Rendimento Sustentado Rio Madeira
- IUCN category VI (protected area with sustainable use of natural resources)
- Location within Brazil
- Nearest city: Porto Velho, Rondônia
- Coordinates: 8°31′08″S 63°50′49″W
- Area: Sector B: 51,856 hectares (128,140 acres); Sector C: 30,000 hectares (74,000 acres)
- Designation: State forest
- Created: 1990
- Administrator: Secretaria de Estado do Desenvolvimento Ambiental

The Rio Madeira Sustainable Yield Forest (Portuguese: Floresta de Rendimento Sustentado Rio Madeira) is a set of managed forests in the state of Rondônia, Brazil. Three sectors, A, B and C, were created in 1990 but only sectors B and C remain. The forests have not been managed in a sustainable manner.

== General ==
The Rio Madeira A, B and C sustainable yield forests were created in 1990, among eight state forests created that year on the left bank of the Madeira River. The others were the Rio Vermelho A, B, C and D sustainable yield forests and the Rio Abunã Sustainable Yield Forest They covered an area of 587,207 hectares (1,451,020 acres). In 1992 the state of Rondônia agreed to implement the Agricultural and Forestry Plan of Rondônia (Planafloro) under a loan agreement with the International Bank for Reconstruction and Development (IBRD). However, during the 1990s the Rondônia government took no effective measures to implement the forests. The Rondônia executive has tended to see development and conservation as incompatible, and has placed development first, opening roads and waterways and allowing occupation and unsustainable use of land.

On 31 August 2000 the Instituto Nacional de Colonização e Reforma Agrária (INCRA – National Institute for Colonization and Agrarian Reform) transferred 19 federal public lands in state conservation units to the state government, including the Rio Madeira A, B and C sustainable yield forests. Law 233/00 of 2000 redefined zoning and eliminated about 70% of the protected areas. Three forests were reduced and three ignored, leaving 150,461 hectares (371,800 acres). The remaining forests were not protected and were subject to invasions. Since then, various people were given ownership documents in Rio Madeira B by INCRA or the Porto Velho department of agriculture. The Banco da Amazônia released funds for agricultural activities within the forests.

== Sector A ==
Conservation units in the Purus-Madeira interfluvial. 20/21. Rio Madeira Sustainable Yield Forest B/C

The Rio Madeira Sustainable Yield Forest (A) was created in the municipality of Porto Velho by Rondônia state decree 4.574 of 23 March 1990, with an area of about 63,812.50 hectares (157,684.1 acres). The land could be declared of public utility and expropriated if the management guidelines were not met. The Rondônia Institute of Land and Colonisation could enter into agreements with public and private enterprises to implement the technical and scientific purposes of the forest. This conservation unit appears to have disappeared after 2000.

== Sector B ==
The Rio Madeira Sustainable Yield Forest (B) is in the municipality of Porto Velho, Rondônia. The forest originally covered 82,437 hectares (203,710 acres), but this was reduced due to the presence of private land titles in the area. The Rio Madeira Sustainable Yield Forest (B) was recreated by decree 7600 of 8 October 1996 with an area of about 51,856 hectares (128,140 acres) under the State Secretariat of State for Environmental Development for the application. The goal was self-sustaining production of renewable natural resources and natural regeneration of the remaining vegetation to ensure the productive capacity of the forest with minimal alternation of ecosystems.

On 1 December 2010 the federal government transferred the Rio Madeira B property to the state. A 2012 analysis of deforestation in the sector B unit using satellite images showed that the goal of sustainability was not being achieved. On 19 February 2014 legislative decree 508 revoked the decree 7.600 that had created the forest. The decree revoking creation was itself suspended as unconstitutional on 14 April 2014, and this decision was upheld on 2 May 2016.

== Sector C ==
The Rio Madeira Sustainable Yield Forest (C) was created by state decree 4.697 of 6 June 1990 with an area of about 30,000 hectares (74,000 acres). It was subject to the Rondônia State Forestry Institute (Instituto Estadual de Florestas de Rondônia), a state agency linked to the Secretariat of State for the Environment. The land could be declared of public utility and expropriated if the management guidelines were not met. The State Forestry Institute could enter into agreements with public and private enterprises to meet the technical and scientific purposes of the forest. The Rio Madeira Sustainable Yield Forest (C) is in the municipality of Porto Velho, Rondônia. The forest is the southeast of the BR-319 highway, north of the city of Porto Velho. 90% of the forest overlaps with the central section of the Cuniã Ecological Station. The vegetation is 100% savanna-rainforest contact.

== Sources ==
- FLORSU do Rio Madeira (B) (in Portuguese), ISA: Instituto Socioambiental
- FLORSU do Rio Madeira (C) (in Portuguese), ISA: Instituto Socioambiental
- Jerônimo Garcia de Santana (23 March 1990), Decreto nº 4574, de 23 de Março de 1990 (in Portuguese)
- Leila Denise; Mara Paraguassu (1 December 2010), "Projeto que cede área de 51 mil hectares de Porto Velho para regularizar floresta é aprovado", Portal Amazônia da Gente (in Portuguese)
- Millikan, Brent; Cardozo, Ivaneide Bandeira; Leroy, Jean Pierre; Caminha, Ludmila; Hargreaves, Maria Inês; Motta, Rogério Vargas; Alves, Vânia; Glass, Verena (June 2008), O Fim da Floresta? A Devastação das Unidades de Conservação e Terras Indígenas no Estado de Rondônia (PDF), Grupo de Trabalho Amazônico - GTA
- Moisés Vieira Fernandes (2012), Floresta Estadual de Rendimento Sustentado Rio Madeira "b": as ocupações humanas e a sustentabilidade do território (PDF) (Thesis) (in Portuguese), Porto Velho – RO
- Valéria Macedo (13 September 2000), Incra cede terras à Rondônia para implementação de Unidades Estaduais de Conservação (in Portuguese), ISA
