= Iquiri National Forest =

National Forest in Brazil

- Floresta Nacional do Iquiri
- IUCN category II (national park)
- Location within Brazil
- Nearest city: Lábrea, Amazonas
- Coordinates: 8.446371°S 66.120596°W
- Area: 1,472,598.67 hectares (3,638,870.6 acres)
- Designation: National forest
- Created: 8 May 2008
- Administrator: Chico Mendes Institute for Biodiversity Conservation

Iquiri National Forest (Portuguese: Floresta Nacional do Iquiri) is a national forest in the state of Amazonas, Brazil. It is a sustainable use conservation unit, so harvesting of forest resources such as timber is allowed in accordance with a management plan.

== Location ==
Conservation units in the Purus-Madeira interfluvial.: 1. Iquiri National Forest

The Iquiri National Forest has an area of 1,472,598.67 hectares (3,638,870.6 acres). It is in the municipality of Lábrea in Amazonas. The Iquiri National Forest is in the Amazon biome. The forest contains 73.05% dense rainforest and 26.95 open rainforest. It has great potential for sustainable harvesting of timber and other forest products such as oils, resins, nuts, seeds and fruits.

== History ==
The Iquiri National Forest was created by decree on 8 May 2008 and is administered by the Chico Mendes Institute for Biodiversity Conservation (ICMBio). It is classed as IUCN protected area category VI (protected area with sustainable use of natural resources) with the objective of sustainable multiple use of forest resources, maintenance and protection of water resources and biodiversity, recovery of degraded areas and support for sustainable exploitation of native forests and scientific research.

An ordinance of 9 January 2012 provided for a consistent and integrated approach to preparing management plans for the conservation units in the BR-319 area of influence. These are the Abufari Biological Reserve, Cuniã Ecological Station, Nascentes do Lago Jari and Mapinguari national parks, Balata-Tufari, Humaitá and Iquiri national forests, and the Lago do Capanã-Grande, Rio Ituxi, Médio Purus and Lago do Cuniã extractive reserves. An advisory council for the Iquiri forest was created on 26 October 2012.

== Sources ==
- Flona do Iquiri (in Portuguese), Chico Mendes Institute for Biodiversity Conservation, archived from the original on 2016-08-17
- FLONA do Iquiri (in Portuguese), ISA: Instituto Socioambiental
- Unidade de Conservação: Floresta Nacional do Iquiri (in Portuguese), MMA: Ministério do Meio Ambiente
