= Humaitá Airport =

Francisco Correa da Cruz Airport Aeroporto Francisco Correa da Cruz
- IATA: HUW; ICAO: SWHT; LID: AM0019

Summary
- Airport type: Public
- Serves: Humaitá
- Time zone: BRT−1 (UTC−04:00)
- Elevation AMSL: 70 m (230 ft)
- Coordinates: 07°32′55″S 063°04′20″W

Map
- Location in Brazil

Runways
Direction	Length		Surface
Direction	m	ft	Surface
14/32	1,520	4,987	Asphalt
- Sources: ANAC, DECEA

Francisco Correa da Cruz Airport (IATA: HUW, ICAO: SWHT) is the airport serving Humaitá, Brazil.

== Access ==
The airport is located 6 km (4 mi) from downtown Humaitá.

== See also ==
- List of airports in Brazil
