= Abufari Biological Reserve =

- Reserva Biológica do Abufari
- IUCN category Ia (strict nature reserve)
- Location within Brazil
- Location: Amazonas (Brazilian state)
- Nearest city: Tapauá
- Coordinates: 5.253°S 63.071°W
- Area: 233,864.64 hectares (577,892.1 acres)
- Designation: Biological reserve
- Created: 20 September 1982
- Administrator: ICMBio

Abufari Biological Reserve (Portuguese: Reserva Biológica do Abufari) is a biological reserve in the state of Amazonas, Brazil. It is mostly lowland tropical rainforest, with very diverse flora and fauna.

== Location ==
Conservation units in the Purus-Madeira interfluvial.: 11. Abufari Biological Reserve

The Abufari Biological Reserve is in the Amazon biome in the municipality of Tapauá, Amazonas. It was created on 20 September 1982 and has an area of 233,864.64 hectares (577,892.1 acres). It is administered by the Chico Mendes Institute for Biodiversity Conservation. To the northeast the reserve adjoins the 1,008,167 hectares (2,491,230 acres) Piagaçu-Purus Sustainable Development Reserve, established in 2003. The terrain is mostly lowland, with altitude from 20 to 70 metres (66 to 230 ft). The Purus River and its tributaries run through the reserve, which also includes a system of lagoons.

== Environment ==
Average annual rainfall is 4,000 millimetres (160 in). Temperatures vary from 20 to 40 °C (68 to 104 °F), with an average of 25 °C (77 °F). The reserve has one of the largest nesting areas for freshwater Amazon turtles, where more than 200,000 freshwater turtles are born each year. Species include the endangered Arrau turtle (Podocnemis expansa), the six-tubercled Amazon River turtle (Podocnemis sextuberculata) and the yellow-spotted river turtle (Podocnemis unifilis). The Abufari reserve has several areas of extreme diversity including the Chapéu complex, an ecosystem that consists of hundreds of lakes, ponds, creeks and areas of flooded forest.

Migratory bird species include American purple gallinule (Porphyrio martinicus), solitary sandpiper (Tringa solitaria), yellow-billed tern (Sternula superciliaris), black skimmer (Rynchops niger), yellow-billed cuckoo (Coccyzus americanus), Swainson's flycatcher (Myiarchus swainsoni), osprey (Pandion haliaetus), tropical kingbird, fork-tailed flycatcher (Tyrannus savana), southern rough-winged swallow (Stelgidopteryx ruficollis), grey-breasted martin (Progne chalybea) and sand martin (Riparia riparia).

== Conservation ==
The Abufari Biological Reserve is a "strict nature reserve" under IUCN protected area category Ia. The purpose is full preservation of its biota and other natural attributes without direct human interference. Protected species include giant otter (Pteronura brasiliensis), cougar (Puma concolor) and Amazonian manatee (Trichechus inunguis). An ordinance of 9 January 2012 provided for a consistent and integrated approach to preparing management plans for the conservation units in the BR-319 area of influence. These are the Abufari Biological Reserve, Cuniã Ecological Station, Nascentes do Lago Jari and Mapinguari national parks, Balata-Tufari, Humaitá and Iquiri national forests, and the Lago do Capanã-Grande, Rio Ituxi, Médio Purus and Lago do Cuniã extractive reserves.

== Sources ==
- FLONA do Iquiri (in Portuguese), ISA: Instituto Socioambiental
- RDS Piagaçu-Purus (in Portuguese), ISA: Instituto Socioambiental
- Reserva Biológica do Abufari (in Portuguese), Chico Mendes Institute for Biodiversity Conservation, archived from the original on 2014-09-27
- Unidade de Conservação: Reserva Biológica do Abufari (in Portuguese), MMA: Ministério do Meio Ambiente
