= Jari River (Purus River tributary) =

- Location within Brazil
- Native name: Rio Jari (Portuguese)

Location
- Country: Brazil

Physical characteristics
- Mouth
  - coordinates: 4.737249°S 62.153826°W

Basin features
- River system: Purus River

The Jari River (Portuguese: Rio Jari) is a river in the state of Amazonas, Brazil, a tributary of the Purus River.

== Course ==
The basin of the Jari River, an important right tributary of the Purus in its middle course, as well as the natural resources and associated fish, is protected by the Nascentes do Lago Jari National Park, an 812,745 hectares (2,008,340 acres) protected area established in 2008. It then forms the eastern border of the 1,008,167 hectares (2,491,230 acres) Piagaçu-Purus Sustainable Development Reserve, established in 2003. The river flows through the Purus-Madeira moist forests ecoregion in its upper reaches. It flows through the Purus várzea ecoregion before joining the Purus.

== See also ==
- List of rivers of Amazonas

== Sources ==
- FLONA do Iquiri (in Portuguese), ISA: Instituto Socioambiental
- RDS Piagaçu-Purus (in Portuguese), ISA: Instituto Socioambiental
- Sears, Robin, Northern South America: Northwestern Brazil (NT0157), WWF: World Wildlife Fund
