= Humaitá National Forest =

National forest in Brazil

- Floresta Nacional de Humaitá
- IUCN category VI (protected area with sustainable use of natural resources)
- Location within Brazil
- Nearest city: Humaitá, Amazonas, Brazil
- Coordinates: 7.995°S 62.513°W
- Designation: National forest
- Administrator: Chico Mendes Institute for Biodiversity Conservation

The Humaitá National Forest (Portuguese: Floresta Nacional de Humaitá) is a national forest in the state of Amazonas, Brazil.

== Location ==
The Humaitá National Forest is in the Humaitá municipality of the state of Amazonas. It covers an area of 473,154.76 hectares (1,169,190.9 acres). The forest is bounded by the border with Rondônia to the south, the Madeira River to the west and the Trans-Amazonian Highway (BR-230) to the north. The Campos Amazônicos National Park is some distance east of the national forest.

The national forest is in the lower plateau of the western Amazon, consisting of extensive flat areas with occasional formations of higher land. Altitudes range from 305 to 915 metres (1,001 to 3,002 ft) above sea level. Drainage is poor, and small lakes form in the rainy season and later disappear. The forest is in the Madeira River basin, on the right bank of the Madeira. The "white water" rivers draining the forest contain large amounts of sediment and form fertile floodplains. The main rivers in the forest are the Maici River, a headwater of the Marmelos, and the Maicimirim and Machado rivers, direct tributaries of the Madeira.

== Environment ==
The national forest is in the Amazon biome. Average annual rainfall is 2,750 millimetres (108 in). Temperatures range from 8 to 40 °C (46 to 104 °F) with an average of 26 °C (79 °F). Vegetation is mostly dense rain forest (94.19%) or contact between savannah and rain forest (5.52%), with a small amount of open rain forest (0.29%). The forest includes areas that are periodically flooded, areas on the slopes and areas higher up, each with distinctive vegetation. There are some deforested areas within and immediately surrounding the forest. Some of the deforestation may have occurred before the forest was established, but recent deforestation has been detected close to areas occupied by livestock along BR-230.

== History ==
The Humaitá National Forest was created by decree 2.485 of 2 February 1998 and is administered by the Chico Mendes Institute for Biodiversity Conservation (ICMBio). It is classed as IUCN protected area category VI (protected area with sustainable use of natural resources) with the objective of sustainable multiple use of forest resources and scientific research, with emphasis on methods for sustainable exploitation of native forests.

The advisory board was established on 17 June 2010 with 17 members from different institutions. An ordinance of 9 January 2012 provided for a consistent and integrated approach to preparing management plans for the conservation units in the BR-319 area of influence. These are the Abufari Biological Reserve, Cuniã Ecological Station, Nascentes do Lago Jari and Mapinguari national parks, Balata-Tufari, Humaitá and Iquiri national forests, and the Lago do Capanã-Grande, Rio Ituxi, Médio Purus and Lago do Cuniã extractive reserves extractive reserves. The management plan was approved on 10 July 2013.

== Sources ==
- Flona de Humaitá (in Portuguese), Chico Mendes Institute for Biodiversity Conservation, archived from the original on 2019-12-10
- FLONA de Humaitá (in Portuguese), ISA: Instituto Socioambiental
- Flona de Humaitá Mapa Interativo (in Portuguese), Chico Mendes Institute for Biodiversity Conservation, archived from the original on 2019-12-10
- FLONA do Iquiri (in Portuguese), ISA: Instituto Socioambiental
- Unidade de Conservação: Floresta Nacional de Humaitá (in Portuguese), MMA: Ministério do Meio Ambiente
