= Mucuim River =

- Location within Brazil
- Native name: Rio Mucuim (Portuguese)

Location
- Country: Brazil

Physical characteristics
- Mouth
  - location: Purus River
  - coordinates: 6.540548°S 64.342590°W
- Length: 350 kilometres (220 mi)

Basin features
- River system: Purus River

The Mucuim River (Portuguese: Rio Mucuim) is a river in Brazil, a tributary of the Purus River.

== Course ==
The Mucuim river flows through the Mapinguari National Park, a 1,776,914 hectares (4,390,850 acres) conservation unit created in 2008. To the north of the national park it is crossed by the Trans-Amazonian Highway (BR-230), then runs through the Balata-Tufari National Forest before joining the Purus. The river flows through the Purus-Madeira moist forests ecoregion in its upper reaches. It flows through the Purus várzea ecoregion before joining the Purus.

== See also ==
- List of rivers of Amazonas

== Sources ==
- Flona de Balata-Tufari Mapa Interativo (in Portuguese), ICMBio, archived from the original on 2016-08-17
- Sears, Robin, Northern South America: Northwestern Brazil (NT0157), WWF: World Wildlife Fund
- Unidade de Conservação: Parque Nacional Mapinguari (in Portuguese), MMA: Ministério do Meio Ambiente
- Ziesler, R.; Ardizzone, G.D. (1979), "Amazon River System", The Inland waters of Latin America, Food and Agriculture Organization of the United Nations, ISBN 92-5-000780-9, archived from the original on 21 October 2013
