= BR-319 (Brazil highway) =

Highway in Brazil

BR-319

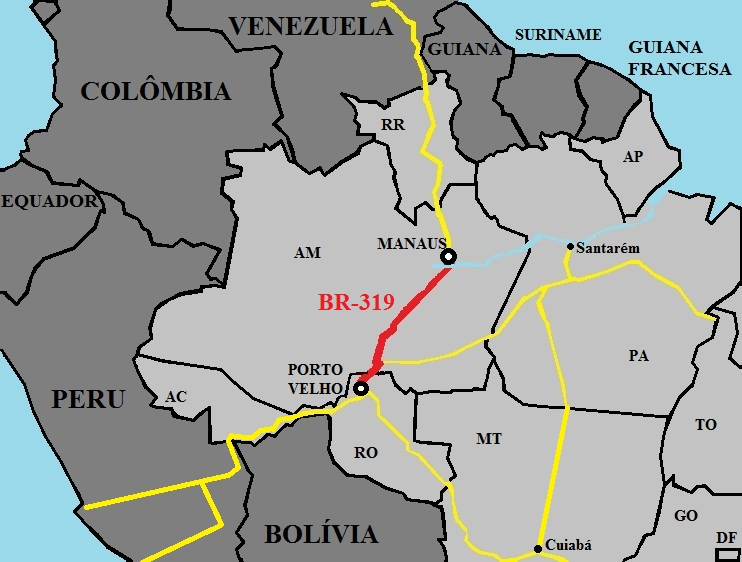
- BR-319 map

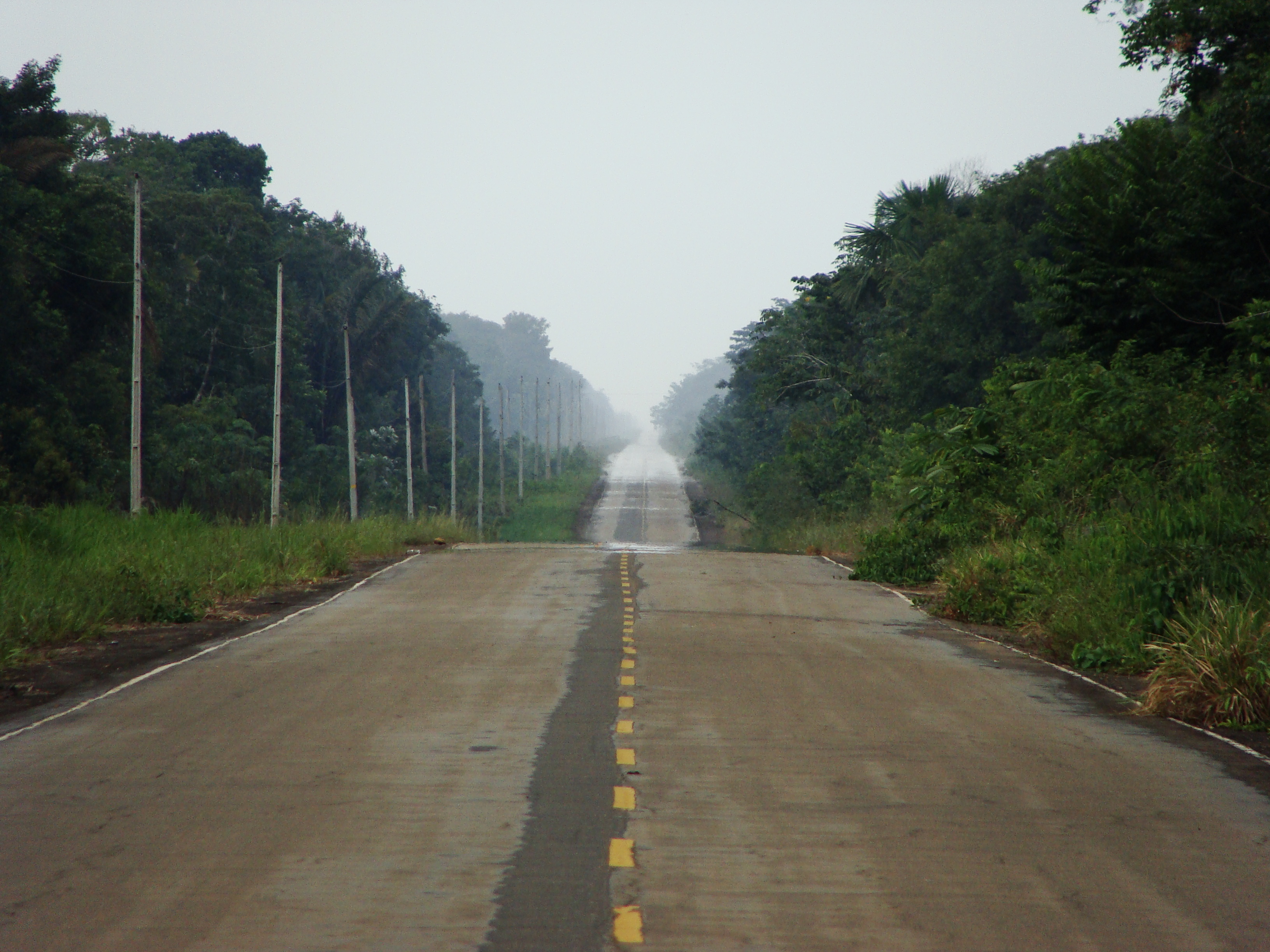
- Bridge on BR-319

Route information
- Length: 885 km (550 mi)
- Existed: 1976–present

Major junctions
- SW end: Porto Velho – BR-364
- Humaitá – BR-230
- NE end: Manaus – BR-174

Location
- Country: Brazil

Highway system
- Highways in Brazil; Federal

BR-319 is an 870-kilometre (540 mi) federal highway in Brazil that links Manaus, Amazonas to Porto Velho, Rondônia. The highway runs through a pristine part of the Amazon rainforest. It was opened by the military government in 1973 but soon deteriorated, and by 1988 was impassable. In 2008 work began to repair the highway, which will provide an alternative to boat travel along the Madeira River or flying between Manaus and Porto Velho. Protected areas have been created along the route in an effort to prevent deforestation when BR-319 is reopened, a serious concern given the devastation caused elsewhere by highways such as BR-364. As of mid-2016 paving of the middle section of the highway had yet to be approved. Construction permits will depend on measures to prevent future damage to the forest.

== Location ==
The 870-kilometre (540 mi) BR-319 highway connects Manaus, Amazonas, to Porto Velho, Rondônia. The highway runs southeast from Manaus to the Ceasa ferry terminal, where ferries carry vehicles across the Amazon River to the Careiro da Várzea terminal on the south shore. From there the highway runs southwest through the interfluvial region between the Purus and Madeira rivers to Porto Velho. The Purus and Madeira basins together account for about 25% of the Amazon basin. Almost all of the highway runs through the Purus-Madeira moist forests ecoregion.

In 2006 the federal government approved a decree that created the Area under Provisional Administration Limitation (ALAP) on both sides of the road. The ALAP includes almost all the interfluvial region up to Porto Velho, and extends along the west bank of the lower section of the Purus and the Solimões. Within the ALAP only licensed economic activities and public works are allowed. Any other activity that may affect the environment is prohibited. The area of influence of the highway extends about 100 kilometres (62 mi) beyond the ALAP. It is about 553,000 square kilometres (214,000 sq mi), with a population of about 1.3 million as of 2016, of whom 70% live in urban areas.

The interfluvial terrain has very flat topography, with altitudes ranging from 30 to 50 metres (98 to 164 ft). The northern region from the Amazon River to kilometre 260 is covered in recent sediments between 7,000 and 27,000 years old. Minor variations in elevation of 1 to 3 metres (3 ft 3 in to 9 ft 10 in) cause shallow seasonal lakes to form. In the north and central sections the vegetation is dense lowland rainforest. To the south, near the Humaitá and Porto Velho municipalities, the forest is open lowland rainforest.

The mammal fauna of the region have not been well studied. A new primate was discovered recently, as well as a procyonid of the Bassaricyon genus far outside its previously known range. The highway could affect biodiversity in the interfluvial region. Environmentalists are concerned that BR-319 connects untouched forest to the "arc of deforestation" created when roads like the controversial BR-364 opened up the forest further south to logging and unsustainable slash-and-burn farming.

== Original construction ==
Construction of the 870 kilometres (540 mi) BR-319 to connect Manaus (AM) to Porto Velho was started in 1968 and completed in 1973. The Andrade Gutierrez consortium undertook construction of the road for the Brazilian military government during the period of the economic miracle. The road was officially inaugurated in 1976, intended to provide secure access to the Purus-Madeira inter-fluvial region. Specifications for the road were weak and it quickly deteriorated due to harsh tropical conditions and lack of maintenance. By 1986 the road was impassible.

In 1996 president Fernando Henrique Cardoso announced a program to rebuild the highway, but it did not get off the ground.

== Alternatives ==
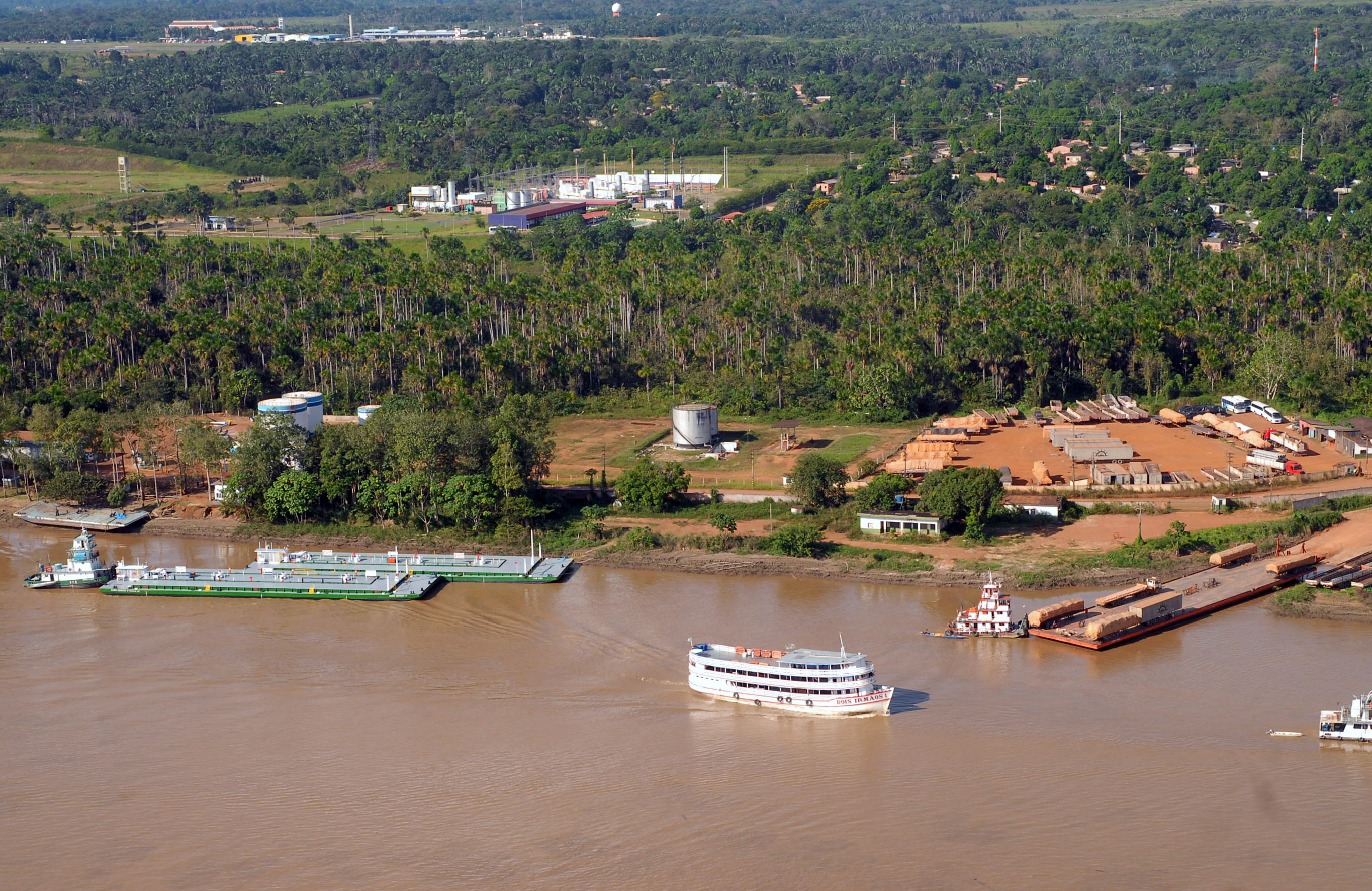
Madeira River near Porto Velho, a cost-effective alternative for bulk cargo

Alternatives to BR-319 include developing a railway along the route and improving the waterway. In 2007 the Amazonas Secretariat for the Environment and Development commissioned a pre-viability study for a railway. A railway would have relatively high construction costs, but would avoid 80% of the carbon emitted by construction of the highway, or 760 million tonnes of carbon. Carbon credits could be used to fund construction of the railway and purchase of rolling stock. Another alternative would be to improve the BR-174 highway from Manaus north to Boa Vista, Roraima, and building a railway from there to ports in Guyana.

A cost-benefit analysis was undertaken by the National Department of Transport Infrastructure (DNIT), but it was flawed. It made optimistic estimates of the number of people that would use the road and the amount that the bus companies would receive in fares, using this number as a benefit, but did not consider the fares the travellers would have paid if they had gone by air or water. (Note: If the bus fare was R$350 and the boat fare was R$450, the social benefit per trip would be R$100. The DNIT cost benefit analysis assumed the benefit would be R$350, the amount earned by the bus company.) It also assumed that goods such as grain, wood and fuel would now be taken via the highway rather than the Madeira waterway, despite the fact that the waterway provides an extremely cost-effective transport method for bulk cargo. After accounting for distortions in the analysis, the project has estimated direct losses of about $162 million, with potential external damage mounting to $1.13 billion.

The highway already provides a corridor for telecommunications. In 2006 Embratel opened a fibre-optical link from Porto Velho to Manaus running along the highway. At a cost of R$15 million a 935-kilometre (581 mi) cable with 12 fibres was attached to 7,106 poles along the highway. 250 workers were involved, mostly local. (Note: In 2013 TIM Brasil provided an alternative fibre optical link from the south to Manaus when the Tucuruí transmission line was completed.) The fibre link is being used to provide internet access to schools in extractive reserves along the route. In 2008 there were plans to replace oil fuelled generators by solar panels to power the computers. The company installed 40 telecommunications towers along the route. The view from a tower in 2009 was a sea of green forest cut by the yellow scar of the highway.

== Reconstruction ==
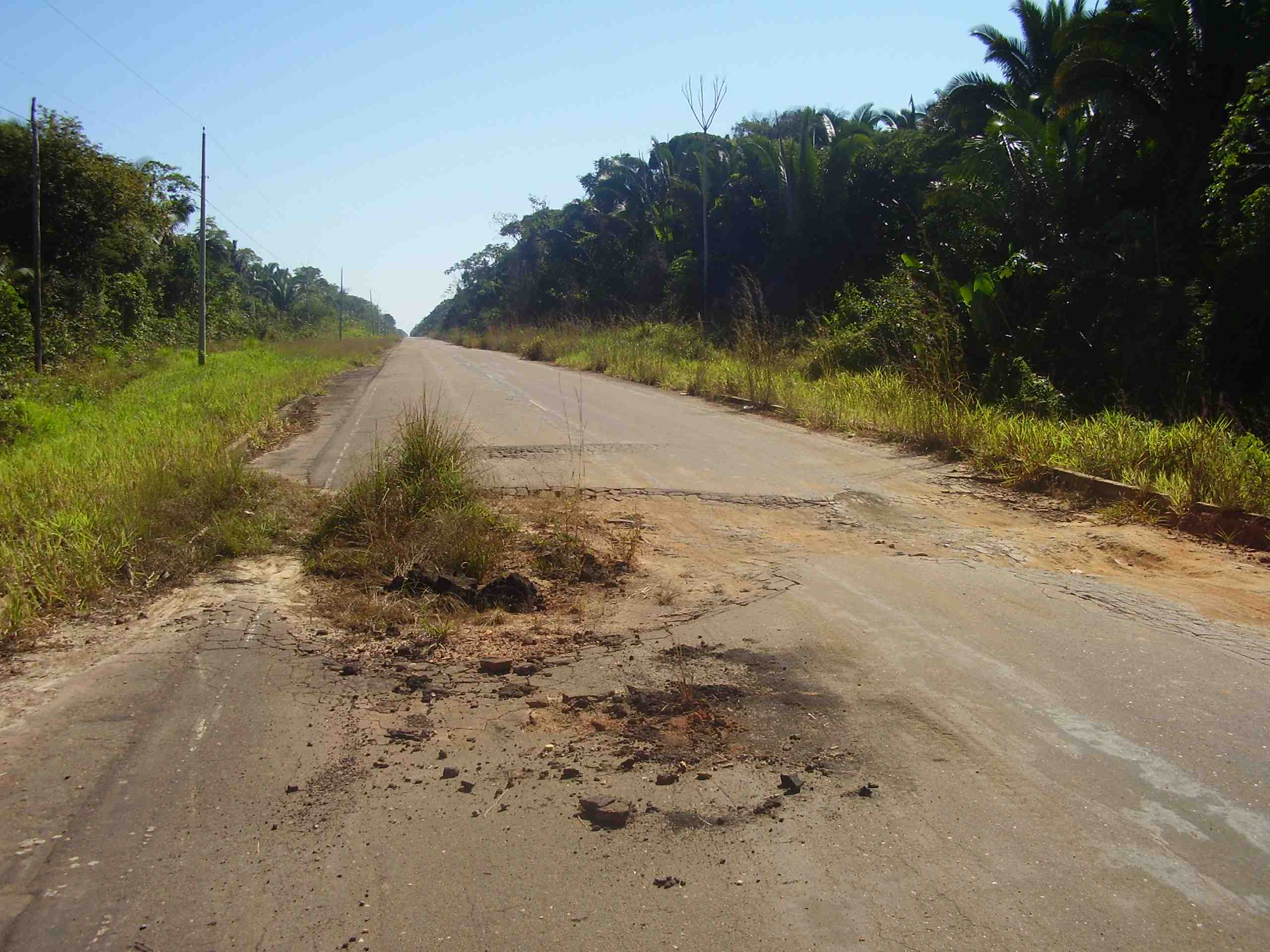
Pothole on the paved section

In 2005 the federal government announced that the highway would be recovered through the Growth Acceleration Program (PAC). The purpose is to make it easier to ship products made in factories in the Manaus Free Trade Zone to São Paulo, as an alternative to sending the containers by sea. Three sections were defined for the purpose of roadworks: a northern section from Manaus to kilometre 250 at Igapó-Açú, a middle section from there to kilometre 655.7 at Humaitá, and a southern section from Humaitá to Porto Velho. In 2007 the Brazilian Institute of Environment and Renewable Natural Resources (IBAMA) issued a Terms of Reference requesting completion of an Environmental Impact Study / Environmental Impact Report (EIA / RIMA) for the middle section. This section is considered to be a new road, since it had seen no traffic for several years. The south and north sections did not require an EIA, since they were already paved and in use. However, the EIA considered environmental and social impacts for the full length of the road.

Some work was done by the federal government between 2008 and 2009 on the basis of a preliminary EIA prepared by the Federal University of Amazonas (UFAM), which was finalised in early 2009. After two versions of the EIA / RIMA had been returned, DNIT prepared a third version in 2009. Almost 80 researchers worked on the EIA over 17 months, at a cost of about US$1.5 million. This still did not meet minimum requirements to verify the project's environmental feasibility. The work was then suspended based on impact studies by IBAMA. Carlos Minc, the Minister of Environment, stated that the work will only be allowed to recommence when the environmental requirements are met, including ensuring that future environmental problems will be prevented in the best preserved region of the Amazon rainforest.

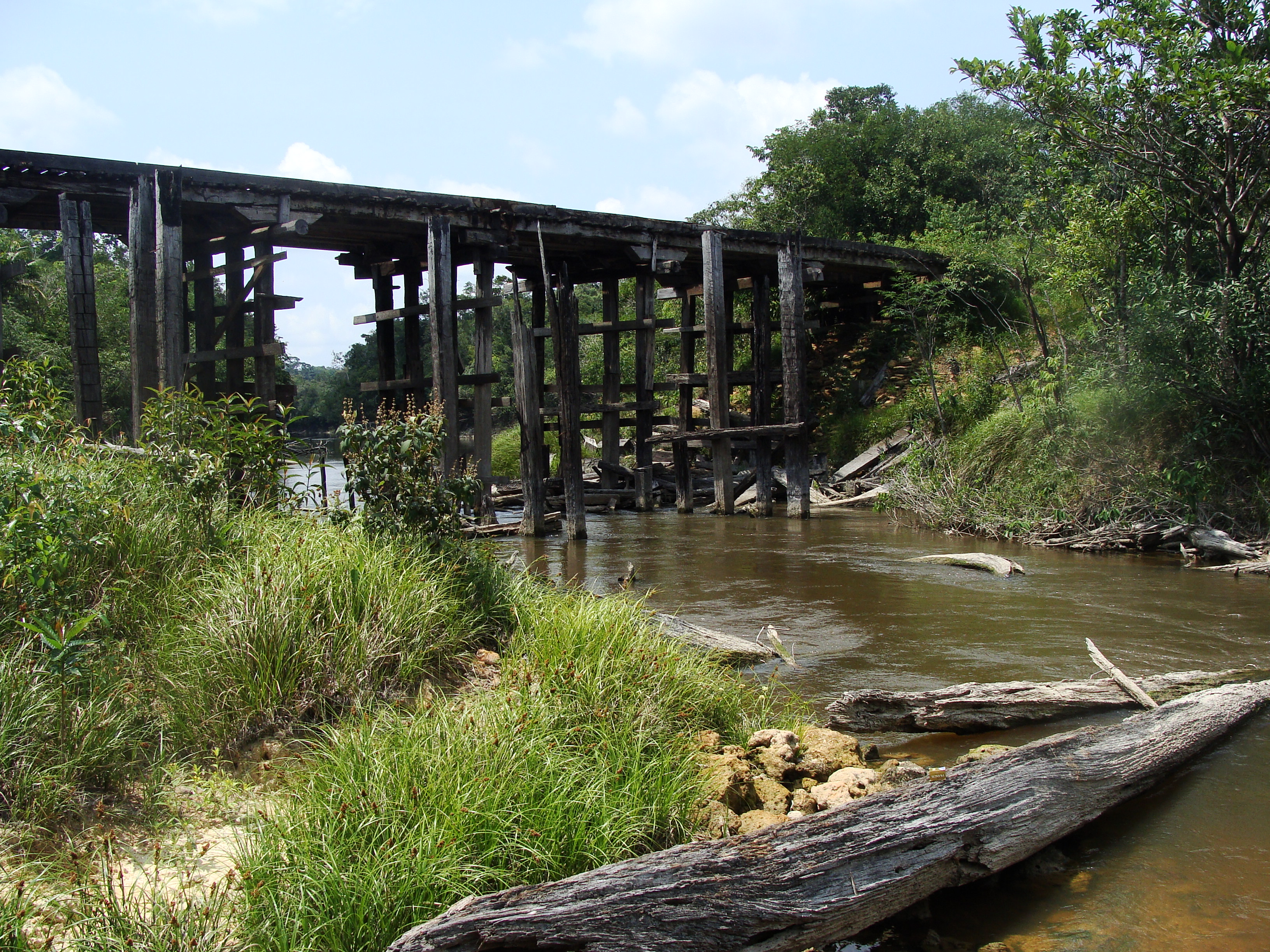
Road bridge

Maintenance was done on the middle section in 2014 and 2015, including removal of quagmires, repair of wooden bridges, replacement of existing culverts, clearing of the road sides and laying the base for the road surface. In October 2015 IBAMA embargoed work on the middle section after finding evidence of irregularities and serious environmental damage, and imposed a fine of R$7,510,500. The next month the Region 1 Federal Court (TRF1) suspended IBAMA's injunction, saying it would cause "serious public harm." On 4 April 2016 IBAMA issued a licence for repairs to the middle section, valid for one year from date of issue. DNIT planned to immediately start work on repairing the wooden bridges and bypasses. Work would resume on the road surface within 40 days, when the rainy season had abated. IBAMA reserved the right to suspend the maintenance work if there were any infringements of the rules, failures to provide accurate information or serious environmental or health risks.

As of April 2016 no date had been set for repaving the highway in the middle section, which would depend on completion of an EIA / RIMA. In May 2016 the Federal Public Ministry (MPF-AM) met in Manaus with representatives from the IBAMA and DNIT to clarify what actions were being done by DNIT and how DNIT intended to comply with the IBAMA license. Marilene Ramos, national president of IBAMA, attended. She said IBAMA's main concern was security guarantees to prevent land invasions, deforestation, illegal mining and other problems. BR-319 could not be treated as a conventional paved road, with no controls.

Cyclists who rode the BR-319 in July 2016 reported that the highway had major tourist potential, but was being poorly exploited. In Rondônia the countryside was a mess due to colonisation, with deforested fields and cattle. In Amazonas it was better, but maintenance had turned the road into a construction site. Four of the bridges they passed were partly submerged, and the streams were being silted. Bus service along the road was taking about 24 hours.

== Conservation ==
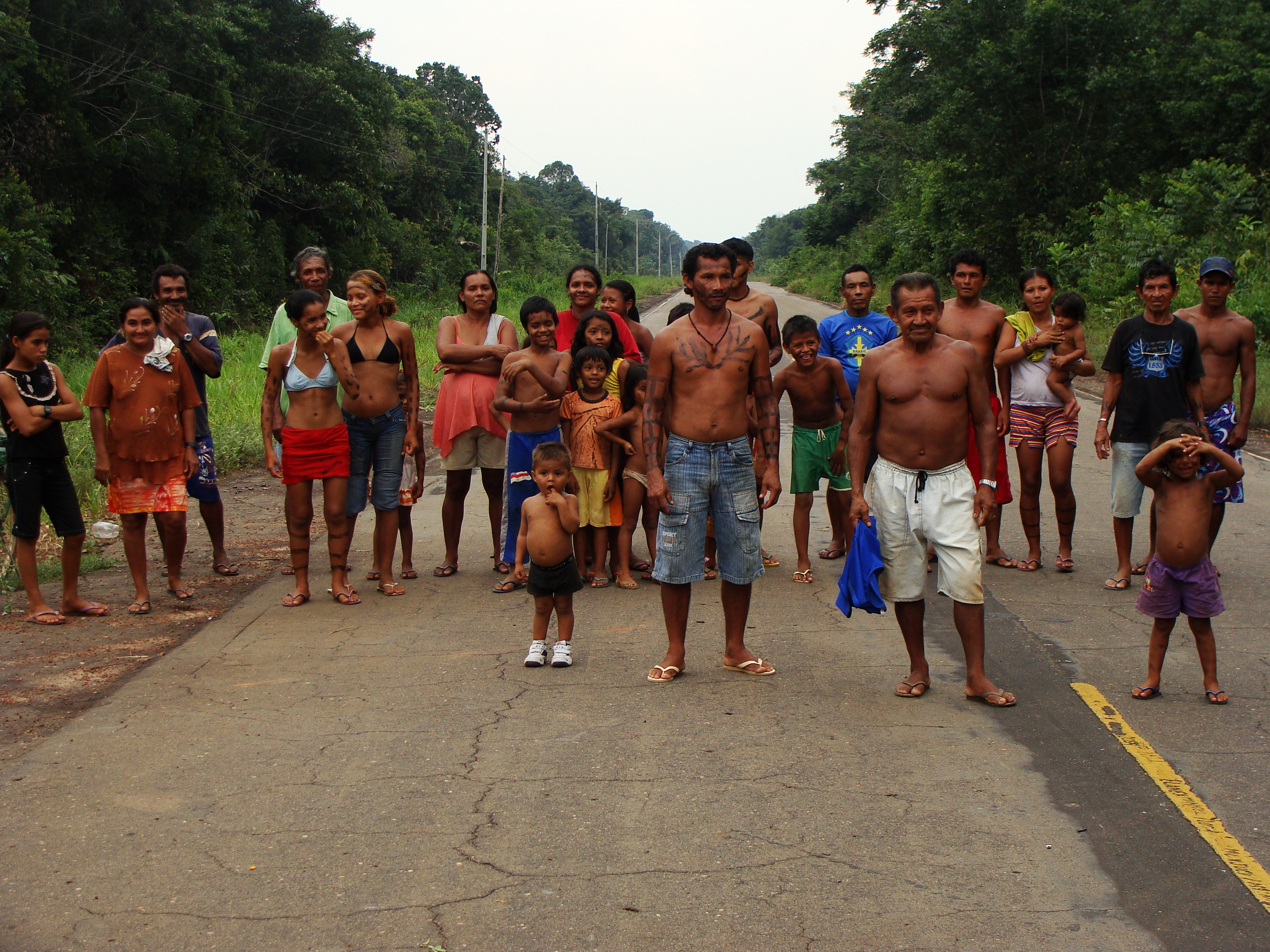
Group of indigenous people on a paved section of the road

The highway is surrounded by extensive protected areas, including conservation units – mainly sustainable use – and indigenous territories of people such as the Mura, Munduruku, Apurinã, Paumarí and Parintintín. Many of the conservation units were created recently as part of efforts by the state and federal governments to mitigate the potential negative effects of repaving the highway. A total of 21 conservation units have been established in the ALAP. The minister of the environment, Carlos Minc, supported implementation of what he called a "green sheath" (bolsão verde) around the highway.

An ordinance of 9 January 2012 provided for a consistent and integrated approach to preparing management plans for the federal conservation units in the BR-319 area of influence. These are the Abufari Biological Reserve, Cuniã Ecological Station, Nascentes do Lago Jari and Mapinguari national parks, Balata-Tufari, Humaitá and Iquiri national forests, and the Lago do Capanã-Grande, Rio Ituxi, Médio Purus and Lago do Cuniã extractive reserves.

Six Amazonas state conservation units totalling 23,000 square kilometres (8,900 sq mi) were created to help meet the requirements for granting an environmental license for reconstruction work on the BR-319 highway. The state-level units in the BR-319 corridor are the Piagaçu-Purus, Rio Amapá, Rio Madeira, Igapó-Açu and Matupiri sustainable development reserves, Canutama Extractive Reserve, Canutama State Forest, Tapauá State Forest and Matupiri State Park. In December 2012 the Amazonas state government allocated more than R$6 million to the nine state-level units, covering 30,000 square kilometres (12,000 sq mi) and 143 communities, to be coordinated by the State Center for Conservation Units (CEUC). The funding was for development of management plans, creation of management councils, environmental monitoring, land survey, and production and marketing.

A protected area mosaic of federal and state conservation units along the highway has been defined in an effort to better prevent deforestation through more efficient management of the overall area. However, WWF-Brazil has pointed out that it is not enough to simply create the protected areas on paper. They must be staffed, delimited, legal owners compensated and so on. The Wildlife Conservation Society of Brazil has initiated a 3-year program to monitor mammals along the highway in the section that runs between the Nascentes do Lago Jari National Park to the west and the Lago do Capanã Grande Extractive Reserve and Rio Amapá Sustainable Development Reserve to the east. This should provide baseline data for measuring the impact of the highway.

== Sources ==
- "Andrade Gutierrez: História de sucesso no Brasil e no mundo", Revista Grandes Construções (in Portuguese), archived from the original on 2016-09-21
- "BR 319", Ecologia e Ação (in Portuguese)
- "BR-319", Programa de Pesquisa em Biodiversidade (PPBio), INPA: National Institute of Amazonian Research
- BR-319 Um eixo sob ameaça, Conservação Internacional
- Carvalho, Luana (31 July 2016), "Rodovia BR-319, que liga Manaus a Porto Velho, é rota de quem busca aventura", A Critica, Manaus: Rede Calderaro de Comunicação S.A
- Clesca, Bertrand (2013), "A Fiber Deployment Project the Size of the Amazon", OSP Magazine, archived from the original on 2016-10-11
- Dijck, Pitou van (2013-03-07), The Impact of the IIRSA Road Infrastructure Programme on Amazonia, Routledge, ISBN 978-0-415-53108-5
- Fearnside, P.M.; de Alencastro Graça, P.M. (November 2006), "BR-319: Brazil's Manaus-Porto Velho highway and the potential impact of linking the arc of deforestation to central amazonia.", Environ Manage, 38 (5): 705–16, doi:10.1007/s00267-005-0295-y, PMID 16990982
- Fearnside, Philip M. (2009), Caracterização do Empreendimento (PDF) (in Portuguese), vol. 1, Federal University of Amazonas, archived from the original (PDF) on 2015-10-01
- FES Canutama (in Portuguese), ISA: Instituto Socioambiental
- Hobbs, Joseph J. (2016-01-29), Fundamentals of World Regional Geography, Cengage Learning, ISBN 978-1-305-85495-6
- Livermore, Michael A.; Revesz, Richard L. (2013-01-07), The Globalization of Cost-Benefit Analysis in Environmental Policy, Oxford University Press, ISBN 978-0-19-993439-3
- Miranda, André (11 February 2008), "The Internet at school's reach", O Globo
- Miranda, Hellen (14 May 2016), "Travessia Manaus-Careiro da Várzea espera o verão e a BR-319", portalamazonia.com
- Monitoring BR 319, WCS Brazil
- "Purus-Madeira moist forests", Global Species, Myers Enterprises II
- "Amazon integration", Report 2007 – Embratel 42 years (PDF), Embratel, archived from the original (PDF) on 2016-10-11
- RESEX do Lago do Cuniã (in Portuguese), ISA: Instituto Socioambiental
- "Reunião discute realização de obras na BR-319, no Amazonas", G1 Globo (in Portuguese), 2 May 2016
- Santos, Marcelo Augusto Junior dos; Graça, Paulo Maurício Lima de Alencastro; Rocha, Vinícius Machado; Silva, Rodrigo Marciente Teixeira da; Bobrowiec, Paulo Estefano Dineli; Tavares, Valéria da Cunha; Fearnside, Philip Martin (April 2015), "Cenários de desmatamento e avaliação preditiva de perda de habitat na região de influência da rodovia BR-319" (PDF), Anais XVII Simpósio Brasileiro de Sensoriamento Remoto – SBSR, National Institute for Space Research, archived from the original (PDF) on 2016-03-25
- Severiano, Adneison (8 April 2016), "Dnit diz que manutenção na BR-319 será retomada na próxima semana", G1 Globo (in Portuguese)
- Six new protected areas created in Brazilian Amazonian state, IUCN, 27 March 2009
- "Torre da Embratel na BR-319", BBC Brasil, 3 November 2009
- Unidades de Conservação estaduais da BR-319 recebem incentivo de R$ 6 milhões para implementação, Amazonas State Government, 26 December 2012
- Viana, Virgílio M. (2010), Sustainable Development in Practice: Lessons Learned from Amazonas, IIED, ISBN 978-1-84369-773-2
