= Humaitá, Amazonas =

Municipality of Amazonas, Brazil

Humaitá
- Municipality
- Municipality of Humaita
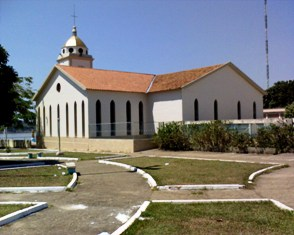
- Humaita Cathedral

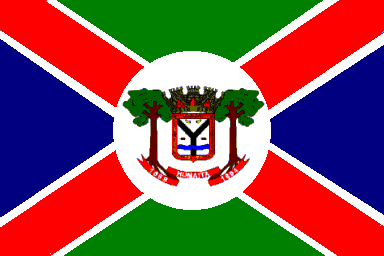
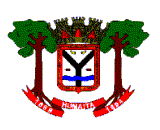
- Flag Coat of arms
- Nickname: "Princesa do Madeira" ("The Princess of the Madeira")
- Amazonas state with Humaita municipality in red

- Location in Brazil
- Coordinates: 07°30′22″S 63°01′15″W
- Country: Brazil
- Region: North
- State: Amazonas
- Demonym: humaitaense
- Founded: February 4, 1890

Government
  - Mayor: Jose Cidenei Lobo do Nascimento (PMDB)

Area
  - Total: 33,071.667 km^{2} (12,769.042 sq mi)
- Elevation: 90 m (300 ft)

Population (2020)
  - Total: 56,144
  - Density: 1.34/km^{2} (3.5/sq mi)
- Time zone: UTC−4 (AMT)
- Website: http://www.humaita.am.gov.br

Humaitá is a municipality located in the Brazilian state of Amazonas. Its population was 56,144 (2020) and its area is 33,072 km^{2}. The city is located on the banks of the Madeira River.

The city is served by Humaitá Airport. The Trans-Amazonian Highway passes through the city.

== Geography ==
The municipality contains part of the strictly-protected Cuniã Ecological Station, an area of cerrado savanna parkland. It contains 5% of the Campos Amazônicos National Park, a 961,318-hectare (2,375,470-acre) protected area created in 2006 that protects an unusual enclave of cerrado vegetation in the Amazon rainforest. It also contains the Humaitá National Forest, a 473,155-hectare (1,169,190-acre) sustainable use conservation unit created in 1998.
