= Careiro da Várzea =

Municipality of Amazonas, Brazil

- Municipality
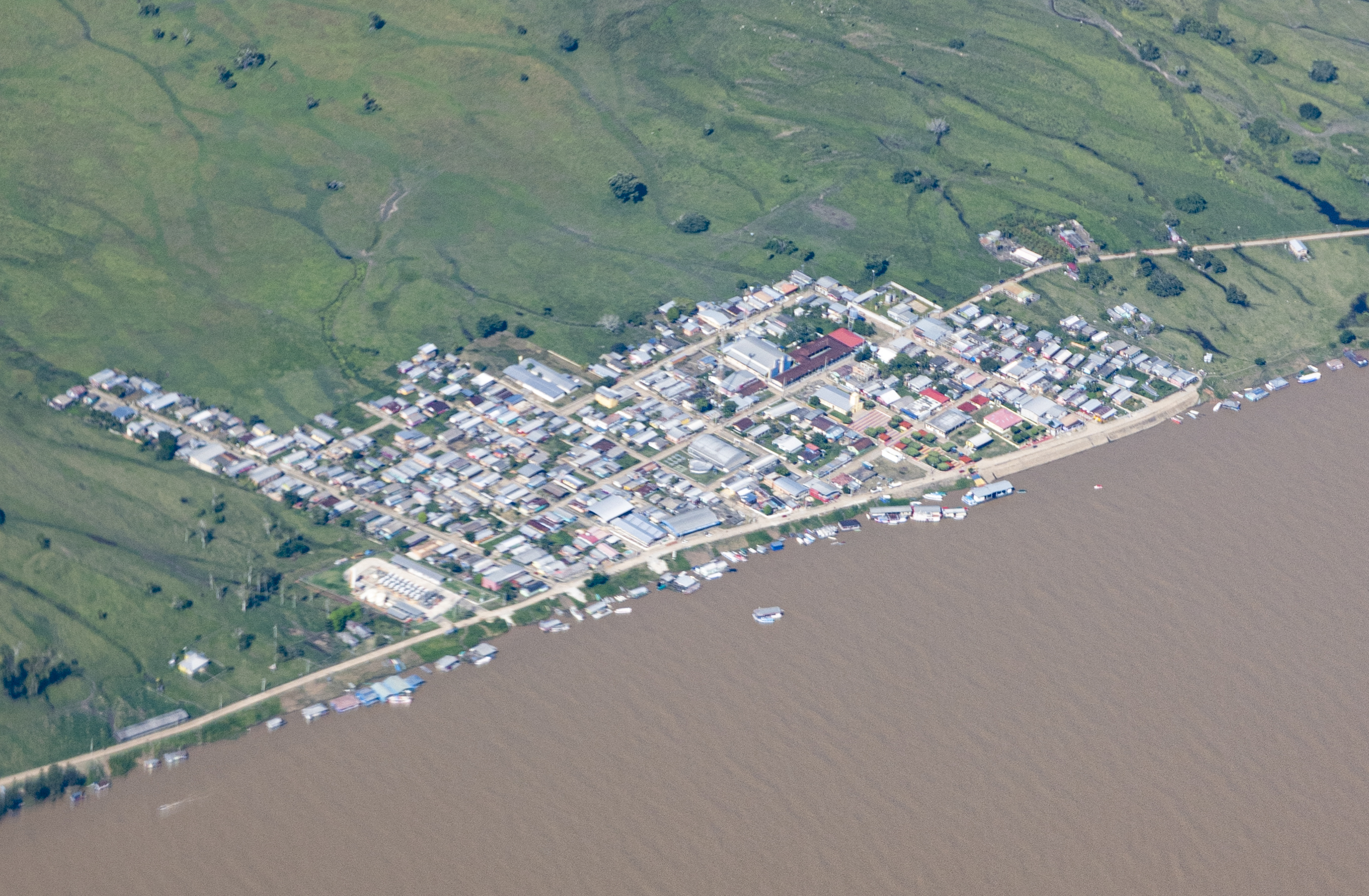

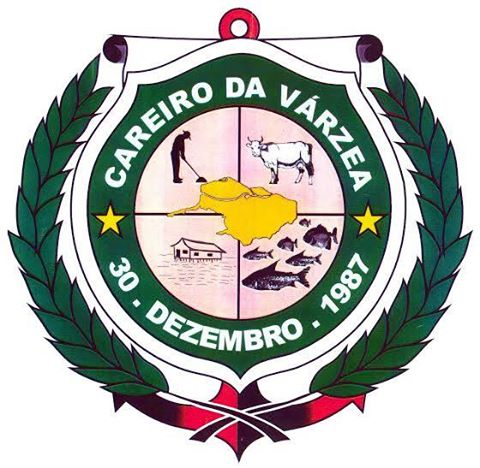
- Coat of arms

- Location of the municipality inside Amazonas

- Location in Brazil
- Coordinates: 3°13′15″S 59°49′33″W
- Country: Brazil
- Region: North
- State: Amazonas

Area
  - Total: 2,631 km^{2} (1,016 sq mi)

Population (2020)
  - Total: 30,846
  - Density: 11.72/km^{2} (30.37/sq mi)
- Time zone: UTC−4 (AMT)

Careiro da Várzea is a municipality located in the Brazilian state of Amazonas. Its population was 30,846 (2020) and its area is 2,631 km^{2}. It lies on the south (right) bank of the Amazon opposite Manaus.

Careiro da Várzea is the terminus of the BR-319 road from southern Brazil. There is a ferry link to Manaus.
