= Mapinguari National Park =

National Park in Rondônia and Amazonas, Brazil

- Parque Nacional Mapinguari
- IUCN category II (national park)
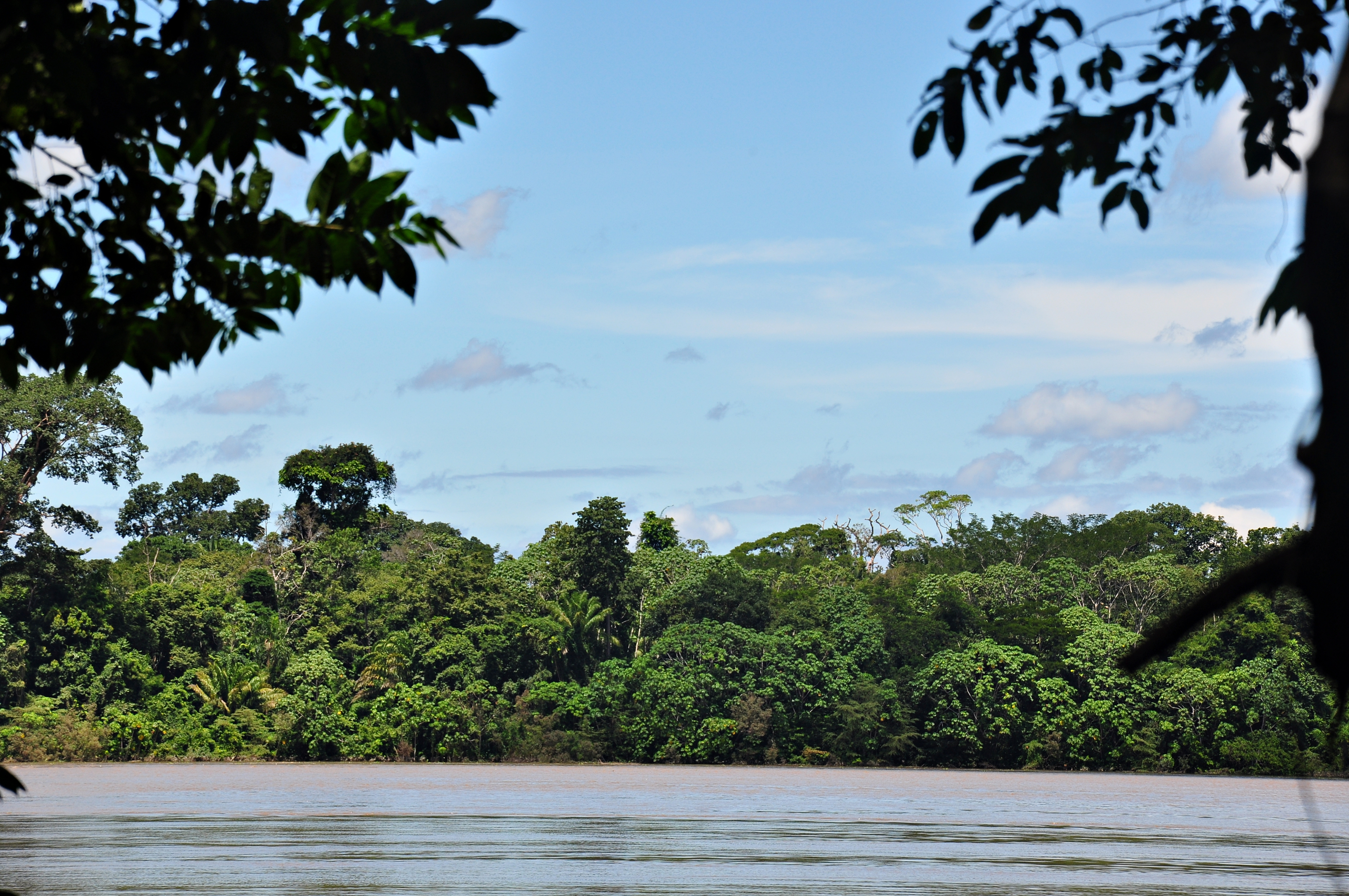

- Location within Brazil
- Nearest city: Porto Velho, Rondônia
- Coordinates: 8°45′07″S 64°38′35″W
- Area: 1,776,914.18 hectares (4,390,850.6 acres)
- Designation: National park
- Created: 5 June 2008
- Administrator: Chico Mendes Institute for Biodiversity Conservation

Mapinguari National Park (Portuguese: Parque Nacional Mapinguari) is a national park in the states of Rondônia and Amazonas, Brazil. It covers a large area of Amazon rainforest. The boundaries have been adjusted several times.

== Location ==
Conservation units in the Purus-Madeira interfluvial.: 3. Mapinguari National Park

The Mapinguari National Park is in the municipalities of Canutama (40%) and Lábrea (50%) in Amazonas and the municipality of Porto Velho (11%) in Rondônia. It has an area of 1,776,914.18 hectares (4,390,850.6 acres). The park is in the Solimões-Amazonas sedimentary basin, in the south Amazon depression. The relief is an extensive pediplain with river terraces, floodplains and meander traces. Altitudes range from 51 to 256 metres (167 to 840 ft) above sea level. It is drained by streams or rivers feeding the left of the Madeira River and the right of the Purus River. The main rivers within the park are the Açuã, Mucuim, Inacorrã, Umari, Ciriquiqui, Punicici, Coari, Anaiquê and Coti.

== Environment ==
The park is in the Amazon biome. Average annual rainfall is 2,700 millimetres (110 in). Temperatures range from 23 to 32 °C (73 to 90 °F) with an average of 27 °C (81 °F). Vegetation includes savannah and rainforest (56%), open submontane rainforest (11%) and savannah parkland (9%). 258,000 hectares (640,000 acres) of the savannah portion is subject to forest fires. Some of the savanna is periodically flooded and susceptible to fires in the dry season. The primate Stephen Nash's titi (Callicebus stephennashi) has been found in the park. A new species of bird, the Campina jay (Cyanocorax hafferi), was recently found in the transition between the rainforest and the natural fields.

== Legal history ==
The Mapinguari National Park was created by decree on 5 June 2008 with an area of 1,572,422 hectares (3,885,540 acres). The objectives are to preserve natural ecosystems of great ecological relevance and scenic beauty, and in particular enclaves of Savannah in the Purus-Madeira interfluvial region, to support scientific research, environmental education, recreation in contact with nature and ecotourism. The park is administered by the Chico Mendes Institute for Biodiversity Conservation (ICMBio).

The boundaries were modified by law 12249 of 11 June 2010 which added about 180,900 hectares (447,000 acres) but excluded the area that would be flooded by the Jirau Dam to create the reservoir for the Jirau Hydroelectric Power Plant. The added land had formerly been state conservation units, the Rio Vermelho State Forest (A and B), the Antônio Mugica Nava Ecological Station and part of the Serra dos Três Irmãos Ecological Station. Law 12249 was challenged in July 2013 by the federal Attorney General on the basis of unconstitutionality. This was followed by moves by the state legislature to annul creation of the state conservation units, which were in turn overturned.

An ordinance of 9 January 2012 provided for a consistent and integrated approach to preparing management plans for the conservation units in the BR-319 area of influence. These are the Abufari Biological Reserve, Cuniã Ecological Station, Nascentes do Lago Jari and Mapinguari national parks, Balata-Tufari, Humaitá and Iquiri national forests, and the Lago do Capanã-Grande, Rio Ituxi, Médio Purus and Lago do Cuniã extractive reserves. Law 12.678 of 25 June 2012 slightly reduced the park's size and allowed mining activities in the buffer zone. The law amended the limits of the Amazônia, Campos Amazônicos and Mapinguari national parks, the Itaituba I, Itaituba II and Crepori national forests and the Tapajós Environmental Protection Area. All of these were reduced in size except the Campos Amazônicos. An advisory council was established on 8 March 2013.

== Sources ==
- FLONA do Iquiri (in Portuguese), ISA: Instituto Socioambiental
- "Justiça suspende revogação de Unidades de Conservação em Rondônia", ((o))eco (in Portuguese), 11 May 2016
- PARNA dos Campos Amazônicos (in Portuguese), ISA: Instituto Socioambiental
- Parna Mapinguari (in Portuguese), Chico Mendes Institute for Biodiversity Conservation, archived from the original on 2020-10-31
- PARNA Mapinguari (in Portuguese), ISA: Instituto Socioambiental
- PGR questiona alteração de áreas florestais em Rondônia (in Portuguese), STF: Supremo Tribunal Federal, 15 July 2013
- RESEX Jaci Paraná (in Portuguese), ISA: Instituto Socioambiental
- Unidade de Conservação: Parque Nacional Mapinguari (in Portuguese), MMA: Ministério do Meio Ambiente

== See also ==
- Purus várzea
