= Cuniã Ecological Station =

Protected area of Brazil

- Estação Ecológica de Cuniã
- IUCN category Ia (strict nature reserve)
- Location within Brazil
- Nearest city: Porto Velho, Rondônia
- Coordinates: 8.100°S 63.179°W
- Area: 186,743 hectares (461,450 acres)
- Designation: Ecological station
- Created: 27 September 2001
- Administrator: ICMBio

Cuniã Ecological Station (Portuguese: Estação Ecológica de Cuniã) is a strictly protected ecological station in the states of Amazonas and Rondônia, Brazil. It preserves an area of savannah parkland on the border of the Amazon rainforest. The conservation unit is rich in lakes and ponds, and serves as a nursery for various species of fish.

== Location ==
Conservation units in the Purus-Madeira interfluvial.: 23. Cuniã Ecological Station

The Cuniã Ecological Station is in the Amazon biome, and covers 186,743 hectares (461,450 acres). It covers parts of the municipalities of Canutama and Humaitá in the state of Amazonas and Porto Velho in the state of Rondônia. 90% of the 30,000 hectares (74,000 acres) Rio Madeira Sustainable Yield Forest (C) overlaps with the ecological station. The terrain bordering the Madeira River alternates between floodplains and lacustrine plains formed by accumulated sediments. Further from the Madeira are the terraces of the Cuniã and Aponiã rivers. Much of the station to the north west is interfluvial plateau with very poor drainage.

Average annual rainfall is 2,500 millimetres (98 in). Temperatures range from 23 to 25 °C (73 to 77 °F) and average 24 °C (75 °F). The environment is rich in lakes and ponds, and serves as a nursery for various species of fish. Vegetation is Savannah parkland rather than regular Amazonian forest. It is classified as open tropical rainforest, with spaced-out individual trees and many clusters of palms, bamboos and lianas. It provides a favourable environment for wildlife. Relatively abundant fauna include paca, tapir, armadillo, deer, macaw and heron. Aquatic species include cichla, arapaima and pterophyllum. There are said to be some Amazonian manatee in the interior lagoons.

== Conservation ==
The Cuniã Ecological Station was created on 27 September 2001, modified on 21 December 2007 and again modified by law 12.249 of 11 June 2010. It is administered by the federal Chico Mendes Institute for Biodiversity Conservation (ICMBio). It is classed as IUCN protected area category Ia (strict nature reserve). The purpose is to protect the headwaters of the Aponiã and Cuniãzinho streams, tributaries of the middle Madeira River, with ecosystems in the transition from Savannah to Forest, and to support development of knowledge about the biodiversity of the Amazon region. The villagers of São Carlos and Nazaré often enter the unit at will and make use of the natural resources, since there are poor controls.

An ordinance of 9 January 2012 provided for a consistent and integrated approach to preparing management plans for the conservation units in the BR-319 area of influence. These are the Abufari Biological Reserve, Cuniã Ecological Station, Nascentes do Lago Jari and Mapinguari national parks, Balata-Tufari, Humaitá and Iquiri national forests, and the Lago do Capanã-Grande, Rio Ituxi, Médio Purus and Lago do Cuniã extractive reserves. The Cuniã-Jacundá Integrated Management (GICJ: Gestão Integrada Cuniã-Jacundá) is a proposed management organization that would take responsibility for three federal conservation units in Rondônia, the Cuniã Ecological Station, Jacundá National Forest and the Lago do Cuniã extractive reserve. All three are managed by ICMBio and have complementary objectives in maintaining a total of 408,000 hectares (1,010,000 acres) of Amazon biome and its transition to savannah.

== Sources ==
- Denis Helena Rivas, "Gestão Integrada Cuniã", PPBIO/CENBAM (in Portuguese)
- "Estação Ecológica de Cuniã", Ambiente Brasil (in Portuguese)
- Estação Ecológica de Cuniã (in Portuguese), Chico Mendes Institute for Biodiversity Conservation
- FLONA do Iquiri (in Portuguese), ISA: Instituto Socioambiental
- FLORSU do Rio Madeira (C) (in Portuguese), ISA: Instituto Socioambiental
- Unidade de Conservação: Estação Ecológica de Cuniã (in Portuguese), MMA: Ministério do Meio Ambiente
