= Tapauá =

Municipality of Amazonas, Brazil

- Municipality

- Location of the municipality inside Amazonas

- Location in Brazil
- Coordinates: 5°37′40″S 63°10′58″W
- Country: Brazil
- Region: North
- State: Amazonas

Area
  - Total: 89,324 km^{2} (34,488 sq mi)

Population (2020)
  - Total: 17,015
  - Density: 0.19049/km^{2} (0.49336/sq mi)
- Time zone: UTC−4 (AMT)

Tapauá is a municipality located in the Brazilian state of Amazonas. Its population was 17,015 (2020) and its area is 89,324 km^{2}, making it the third largest municipality in Amazonas and the fifth largest in Brazil, comparable to South Carolina or Jordan.

== Geography ==
=== Conservation ===
The municipality contains the 233,864-hectare (577,890-acre) Abufari Biological Reserve, a strictly protected area. It contains 30.35% of the 1,008,167-hectare (2,491,230-acre) Piagaçu-Purus Sustainable Development Reserve, established in 2003. The municipality contains about 9% of the Balata-Tufari National Forest, a 1,079,670-hectare (2,667,900-acre) sustainable use conservation unit created in 2005. The municipality also contains about 94% of the Nascentes do Lago Jari National Park, an 812,745-hectare (2,008,340-acre) protected area established in 2008. It contains 0.33% of the 604,209-hectare (1,493,030-acre) Médio Purus Extractive Reserve, created in 2008. It contains 98% of the 881,704-hectare (2,178,740-acre) Tapauá State Forest, created in 2009.
