= Lábrea =

Municipality of Amazonas, Brazil

- Municipality
- Municipality of Lábrea

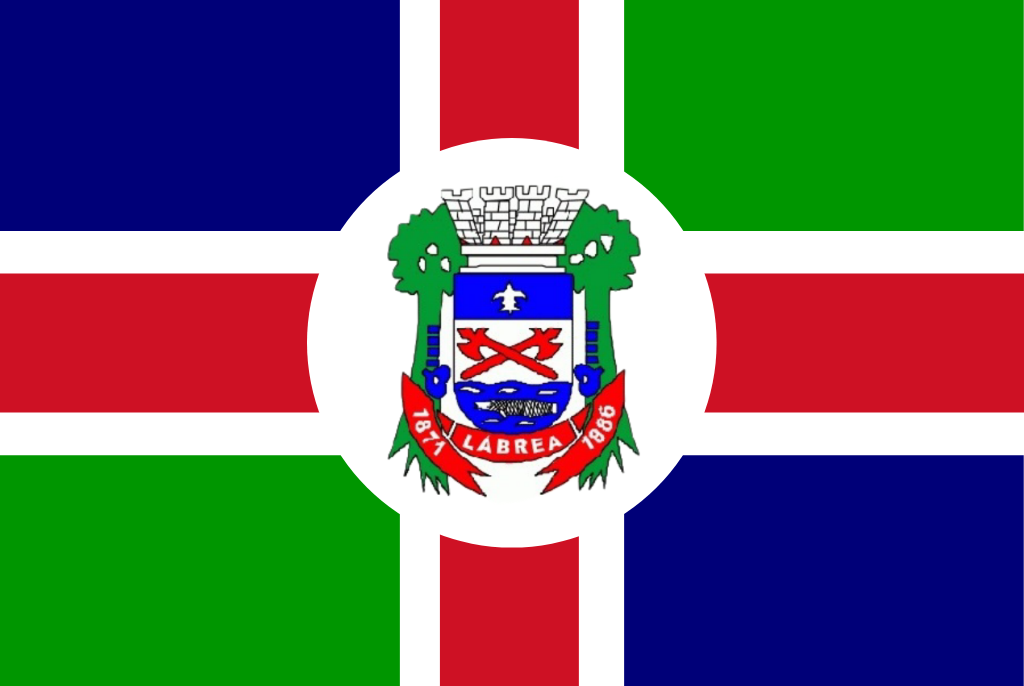
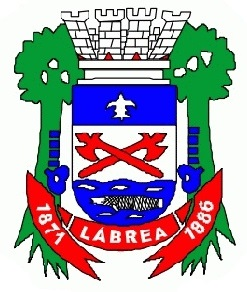
- Flag Coat of arms

- Location in Brazil
- Coordinates: 07°15′32″S 64°47′52″W
- Country: Brazil
- Region: North
- State: Amazonas
- Founded: March 7, 1881

Government
  - Mayor: Gean Campos de Barros (PMDB)

Area
  - Total: 68,508.6 km^{2} (26,451.3 sq mi)
- Highest elevation: 75 m (246 ft)
- Lowest elevation: 61 m (200 ft)

Population (2020)
  - Total: 46,882
  - Density: 0.55/km^{2} (1.4/sq mi)
- Time zone: UTC-4 (AST)
- HDI (2000): 0.598 – medium

Lábrea (Portuguese pronunciation: [ˈlabɾjɐ]) is the southernmost municipality in the Brazilian state of Amazonas.

== Economy ==
The population of the Lábrea municipality was 46,882 as of 2020. Its area is 68,508.6 square kilometres (26,451.3 sq mi). This makes it the sixth largest municipality in Amazonas by area and the tenth largest in Brazil. The town is the seat of the Territorial Prelature of Lábrea. Lábrea Airport is served by scheduled regular air connections.

== Geography ==
=== Conservation ===
The municipality contains the Iquiri National Forest, a 1,472,599-hectare (3,638,870-acre) sustainable use conservation unit created in 2008. The municipality also contains part of the Mapinguari National Park, a 1,776,914 hectares (4,390,850 acres) conservation unit created in 2008. It contains the 776,940-hectare (1,919,900-acre) Ituxi Extractive Reserve, created in 2008. It contains 91% of the 604,209-hectare (1,493,030-acre) Médio Purus Extractive Reserve, created in 2008.

=== Climate ===
Lábrea has a tropical monsoon climate (Köppen Am) with consistently hot temperatures and very oppressive humidity. Rainfall is heavy for most of the year with the annual average being close to 2,400 millimetres or 90 inches; however a short dry season in June and July when monthly rainfall averages less than 50 millimetres or 2 inches places the climate in the tropical monsoon rather than tropical rainforest category.

Climate data for Lábrea (1981–2010, extremes 1973–present)
Month	Jan	Feb	Mar	Apr	May	Jun	Jul	Aug	Sep	Oct	Nov	Dec	Year
Record high °C (°F)	36.6 (97.9)	39.2 (102.6)	39.4 (102.9)	38.4 (101.1)	36.6 (97.9)	38.5 (101.3)	38.2 (100.8)	39.2 (102.6)	40.0 (104.0)	39.8 (103.6)	38.4 (101.1)	39.4 (102.9)	40.0 (104.0)
Mean daily maximum °C (°F)	31.5 (88.7)	31.4 (88.5)	31.6 (88.9)	31.8 (89.2)	31.5 (88.7)	31.5 (88.7)	32.7 (90.9)	33.6 (92.5)	33.6 (92.5)	33.1 (91.6)	32.2 (90.0)	31.6 (88.9)	32.2 (90.0)
Daily mean °C (°F)	26.1 (79.0)	26.1 (79.0)	26.0 (78.8)	26.2 (79.2)	25.8 (78.4)	25.4 (77.7)	25.4 (77.7)	26.1 (79.0)	26.6 (79.9)	26.6 (79.9)	26.2 (79.2)	26.0 (78.8)	26.0 (78.8)
Mean daily minimum °C (°F)	21.9 (71.4)	21.8 (71.2)	22.0 (71.6)	21.8 (71.2)	21.6 (70.9)	20.3 (68.5)	19.2 (66.6)	20.1 (68.2)	21.0 (69.8)	21.4 (70.5)	21.3 (70.3)	21.5 (70.7)	21.2 (70.2)
Record low °C (°F)	16.2 (61.2)	16.2 (61.2)	15.6 (60.1)	17.0 (62.6)	10.8 (51.4)	10.2 (50.4)	7.8 (46.0)	11.0 (51.8)	12.0 (53.6)	12.2 (54.0)	12.8 (55.0)	15.8 (60.4)	7.8 (46.0)
Average rainfall mm (inches)	314.1 (12.37)	315.2 (12.41)	357.7 (14.08)	273.7 (10.78)	147.8 (5.82)	46.1 (1.81)	32.4 (1.28)	72.7 (2.86)	112.5 (4.43)	198.8 (7.83)	243.2 (9.57)	291.2 (11.46)	2,405.4 (94.7)
Average rainy days (≥ 1.0 mm)	19	18	19	17	13	6	5	6	8	11	15	18	155
Average relative humidity (%)	87.6	87.6	87.9	87.9	87.7	85.6	82.1	80.3	81.1	83.1	85.7	87.3	85.3
Mean monthly sunshine hours	93.0	84.6	93.8	102.1	131.0	179.7	209.4	177.1	145.5	134.1	113.2	94.1	1,557.6
Source 1: Instituto Nacional de Meteorologia
Source 2: Meteo Climat (record highs and lows)
