= Suruí =

Suruí may refer to:

- The Suruí, or Paiter, an indigenous people of Rondônia, Brazil
  - Surui language, language of the Paiter people
- Suruí do Pará people, an indigenous people of Pará, Brazil
  - Suruí do Pará language
- Suruí River, a river in Rio de Janeiro state in southeastern Brazil
- BYD Surui, a premium trim level of the BYD F3 compact sedan
