= Greater Rio de Janeiro =

Metropolitan area in Brazil

Coordinates: 22.9028°S 43.2078°W

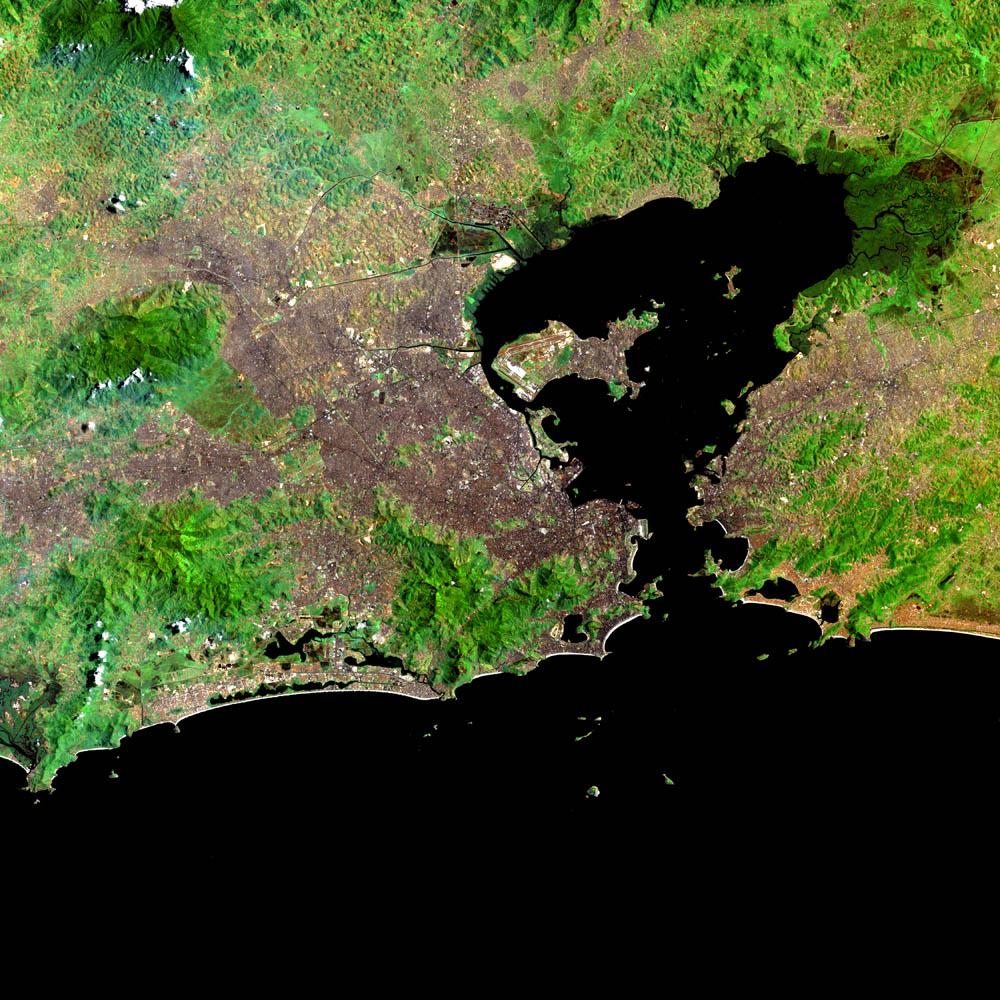
Satellite image of the metropolitan area, with the capital from the center below, Baixada Fluminense on the north-west and Niterói and São Gonçalo east of the Guanabara Bay

Cities of the Greater Rio de Janeiro in Red, in the state of Rio de Janeiro.

Greater Rio de Janeiro, officially the Rio de Janeiro Metropolitan Region (Grande Rio, officially Região Metropolitana do Rio de Janeiro, in Portuguese) is a large metropolitan area located in Rio de Janeiro state in Brazil, the second largest in Brazil and third largest in South America. It consists of 22 municipalities, including the state capital, Rio de Janeiro.

The metropolitan area of Rio de Janeiro is known as a historical, cultural and economic centre of Brazil, with a total population of 12 million inhabitants. The region was first officially defined on July 1, 1974, less than 1 year before the fusion of Guanabara into Rio de Janeiro. Several municipalities show a high level of conurbation, with Rio de Janeiro–Baixada Fluminense and Niterói–São Gonçalo being the most clear examples. It was changed several times to include or remove different cities in different moments of the history, in the years 1993, 2001, 2002, 2009, 2013 and 2018.

The water supply plans of the region are coordinated, and transportation in the area is heavily interconnected with urban intermunicipal buses to all municipalities in the area, trains over the capital to some Baixada Fluminense municipalities, ferry boats to some of the Guanabara Bay municipalities and major inter-city freeways such as the Rio–Niterói Bridge, Red Line, President Dutra freeway and the Niterói-Manilha freeway (pt). Most transportation methods are integrated with the capital inner-transportation system of buses, trains, metro, freeways and expressways.

== Cities by population (2022) ==
1,000,000+

- Rio de Janeiro: 6,211,423

400,000 – 999,999

- São Gonçalo: 896,744
- Duque de Caxias: 808,152
- Nova Iguaçu: 785,822
- Belford Roxo: 483,087
- Niterói: 481,758
- São João de Meriti: 440,962

100,000 – 399,999

- Petrópolis: 278,881
- Magé: 228,127
- Itaboraí: 224,267
- Maricá: 197,300
- Mesquita: 167,128
- Nilópolis: 146,774
- Queimados: 140,523
- Itaguaí: 116,841

0 - 100,000

- Japeri: 96,289
- Seropédica: 80,596
- Cachoeiras de Macacu: 56,943
- Rio Bonito: 56,276
- Guapimirim: 51,696
- Paracambi: 41,375
- Tanguá: 31,086

== Statistics ==
- Population: 12,022,050 (2022)
  - Most populous city: Rio de Janeiro: 6,211,423 (2018 est.)
- Nominal GDP: R$413.93 Billion
  - Largest GDP City: Rio de Janeiro City: R$282.5 billion (2013 est.)
- Nominal GDP per capita: R$33,856.54 (2013 est.)
- HDI: 0,771 (2010 est.)
  - Highest HDI City: Niterói: 0,837 (2010 est.)

== Municipalities ==
The 22 municipalities of the area are:

Municipality	Area (km²)	Population (2000 Census)	Population (2010 Census)	Population (2022 Census)	Population density 2022 (/km²)
Belford Roxo	79.791	434,474	469,261	483,087	6,054.40
Cachoeiras de Macacu	955.806	48,543	54,273	56,943	59.58
Duque de Caxias	464.573	775,456	855,046	808,152	1,739.56
Guapimirim	356.566	37,952	51,487	51,696	144.98
Itaboraí	430.375	187,479	218,090	224,267	521.10
Itaguaí	273.414	82,003	109,091	116,841	427.34
Japeri	82.454	83,278	95,391	96,289	1,167.79
Magé	385.700	205,830	228,150	228,127	591.46
Maricá	362.571	76,737	12,761	197,300	544.17
Mesquita	41.490	no data	168,403	167,128	4,028.15
Nilópolis	19.157	153,712	157,483	146,774	7,661.64
Niterói	129.375	459,451	487,327	481,758	3,723.73
Nova Iguaçu	520.807	920,599	797,212	785,822	1,508.85
Paracambi	179.374	40,475	47,124	41,375	230.66
Petrópolis	795.798	286,537	295,917	278,881	350.44
Queimados	75.701	121,993	137,938	140,523	1,856.29
Rio Bonito	462.156	49,691	55,551	56,276	121.77
Rio de Janeiro	1,221.000	5,857,904	6,323,037	6,211,423	5,087.16
São Gonçalo	249.143	891,119	1,013,901	896,744	3,599.31
São João de Meriti	34.838	449,476	459,356	440,962	12,657.50
Seropédica	283.794	65,260	78,183	80,596	283.99
Tanguá	145.503	26,057	30,731	31,086	213.65
Metropolitan Rio Janeiro	7,549.386	10,670,040	12,603,936	12,022,050	1,592.45
