= Guapimirim Environmental Protection Area =

Protected coastal marine area in Rio de Janeiro, Brazil

- Área de Proteção Ambiental de Guapimirim
- IUCN category V (protected landscape/seascape)
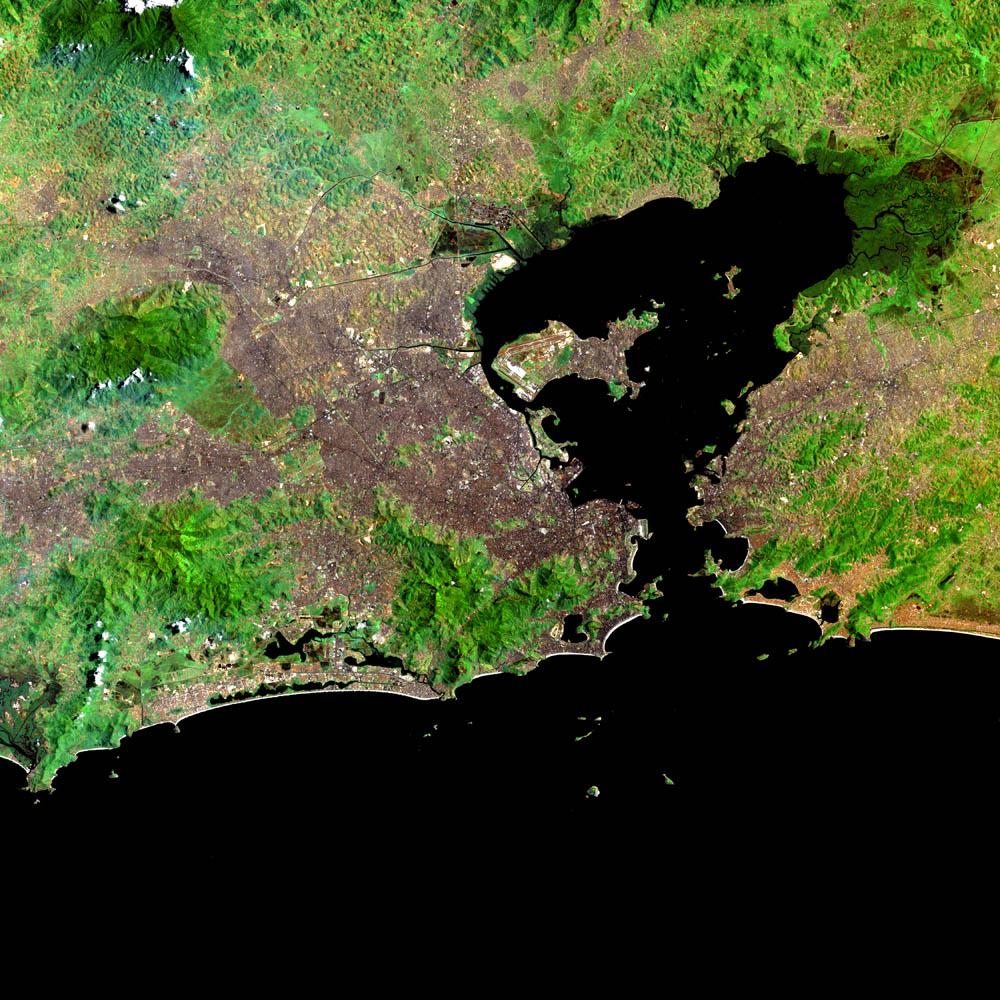
- Rio de Janeiro. The protected area is in the upper right. The mangroves are dark green.

- Location within Brazil
- Nearest city: Magé, Rio de Janeiro
- Coordinates: 22.720°S 42.994°W
- Area: 13,926 hectares (34,410 acres)
- Designation: Environmental Protection Area
- Created: 25 September 1984

Guapimirim Environmental Protection Area (Portuguese: Área de Proteção Ambiental de Guapimirim) is a coastal marine protected area on Guanabara Bay in the state of Rio de Janeiro, southeastern Brazil.

== Location ==
The marine coastal protection area, which covers 13,926 hectares (34,410 acres) was created on 25 September 1984. It is administered by the Chico Mendes Institute for Biodiversity Conservation. The area includes all or part of the municipalities of Guapimirim, Itaboraí, Magé and São Gonçalo in the state of Rio de Janeiro. It contains the strictly protected 1,936 hectares (4,780 acres) Guanabara Ecological Station, created in 2006. It is in the Central Rio de Janeiro Atlantic Forest Mosaic, created in 2006.

== Mangrove ecology ==
The area includes the 2,000 hectares (4,900 acres) Guanabara Ecological Station, created on 15 February 2006, which protects one of the last sections of midsize contiguous mangrove habitats in the state. The mangroves shelter species that are endangered in the state, including the anhinga (Anhinga anhinga), fulvous whistling duck (Dendrocygna bicolor), and broad-snouted caiman (Caiman latirostris).

== Conservation ==
The area is classed as IUCN protected area category V, protected landscape/seascape. The purpose is to maintain biological diversity, manage human settlements and ensure sustainable use of natural resources. The main goal is to protect the remaining mangroves in Guanabara Bay, and to preserve the human populations that maintain a traditional lifestyle in a close relationship with the environment. Protected species include the starfish Coscinasterias tenuispina.

== See also ==
- Mangroves
- Protected areas of Rio de Janeiro (state)

== Sources ==
- APA de Guapimirim (in Portuguese), Chico Mendes Institute for Biodiversity Conservation
- Costa, Cláudia; Lamas, Ivana; Fernandes, Rosan (December 2010), Planejamento Estratégico do Mosaico Central Fluminense (PDF) (in Portuguese), Reserva da Biosfera da Mata Atlântica, archived from the original (PDF) on 2016-10-07
- Gestao Integrada Apa Guapimirin e Esec Guanabara: Quem Somos (in Portuguese), ICMBio
- Unidade de Conservação: Área de Proteção Ambiental de Guapi-Mirim (in Portuguese), MMA: Ministério do Meio Ambiente
