= Serra do Barbosão Municipal Nature Park =

Municipal nature park in Rio de Janeiro, Brazil

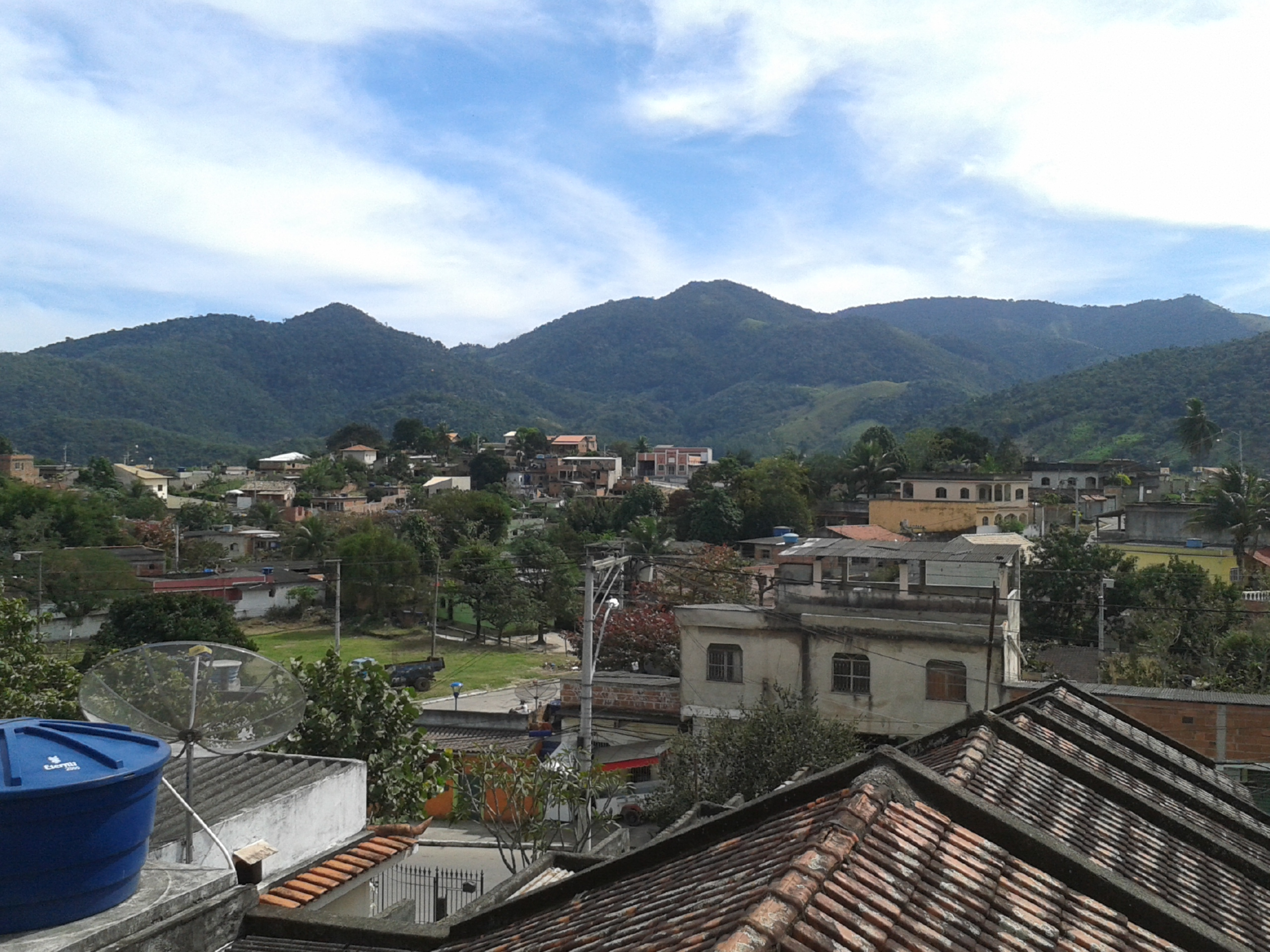
- Tanguá, Serra do Barbosão in background

- Location within Brazil
- Nearest city: Tanguá, Rio de Janeiro
- Coordinates: 22°43′03″S 42°44′32″W
- Area: 878 hectares (2,170 acres)
- Designation: Municipal nature park
- Created: 23 October 2007
- Administrator: Secretaria Municipal de Meio Ambiente

The Serra do Barbosão Municipal Nature Park is a municipal nature park in the state of Rio de Janeiro, Brazil. It protects an area of Atlantic Forest.

== Location ==
The Serra do Barbosão Municipal Nature Park is in the municipality of Tanguá, Rio de Janeiro. It has an area of about 878 hectares (2,170 acres). The park is in the north of the municipality, and covers 6.2% of its area. The Serra do Barbosão, together with the Serra do Sambê and the Serra de Santa Fé, holds well-preserved stretches of Atlantic Forest. The Serra do Barbosão is considered to be the main environmental heritage of the municipality. The park contains the remains of a slave cemetery. It is a popular location for walking, hiking and camping.

The Serra do Barbosão is part of the Sambê - Santa Fé – Barbosão ecological corridor, and indirectly influences the neighboring municipalities of Rio Bonito, Silva Jardim and Cachoeiras de Macacu in helping preserve the forest remnants and local biodiversity. As of 2011 there was no management plan and expropriation of land for the park was incomplete. The area was suffering from encroachment and deforestation. Tanguá has one of Brazil's four fluorite mines, accounting for 11% of national production, an open pit and underground operation near the park. Potential contamination was a concern.

== History ==
The Serra do Barbosão Municipal Nature Park was created by municipal law 6333 of 23 October 2007. Objectives included protecting and preserving remnants of Atlantic Forest, preserving and maintaining genetic diversity of important examples of flora and fauna, supporting recreation, environmental education and scientific research, and protecting water resources.

The park was included in the Central Rio de Janeiro Atlantic Forest Mosaic, created in December 2006. In March 2016 the state government's Instituto Vital Brazil received approval for a project to survey flora and fauna in the park, including birds, reptiles, butterflies and moths. Among other benefits, the survey would provide material for environmental and health education at Vital Brazil's Tanguá Campus.

== Sources ==
- Barros Ferraz, Ricardo Frosini de; Kranz, Patricia (8 February 2011), Agenda 21 Tanguá (PDF) (in Portuguese), Prefeito de Tanguá
- Costa, Cláudia; Lamas, Ivana; Fernandes, Rosan (December 2010), Planejamento Estratégico do Mosaico Central Fluminense (PDF) (in Portuguese), Reserva da Biosfera da Mata Atlântica, archived from the original (PDF) on 2016-10-07
- Pereira, Carlos Roberto (23 October 2007), Lei nº. 0633, de 23 de Outubro de 2007 (in Portuguese)
- Vital Brazil investe em pesquisa de biodiversidade em Tanguá (in Portuguese), Vital Brazil, 10 March 2016
