= Serra dos Órgãos National Park =

National park in Rio de Janeiro, Brazil

- Parque Nacional da Serra dos Órgãos
- IUCN category II (national park)
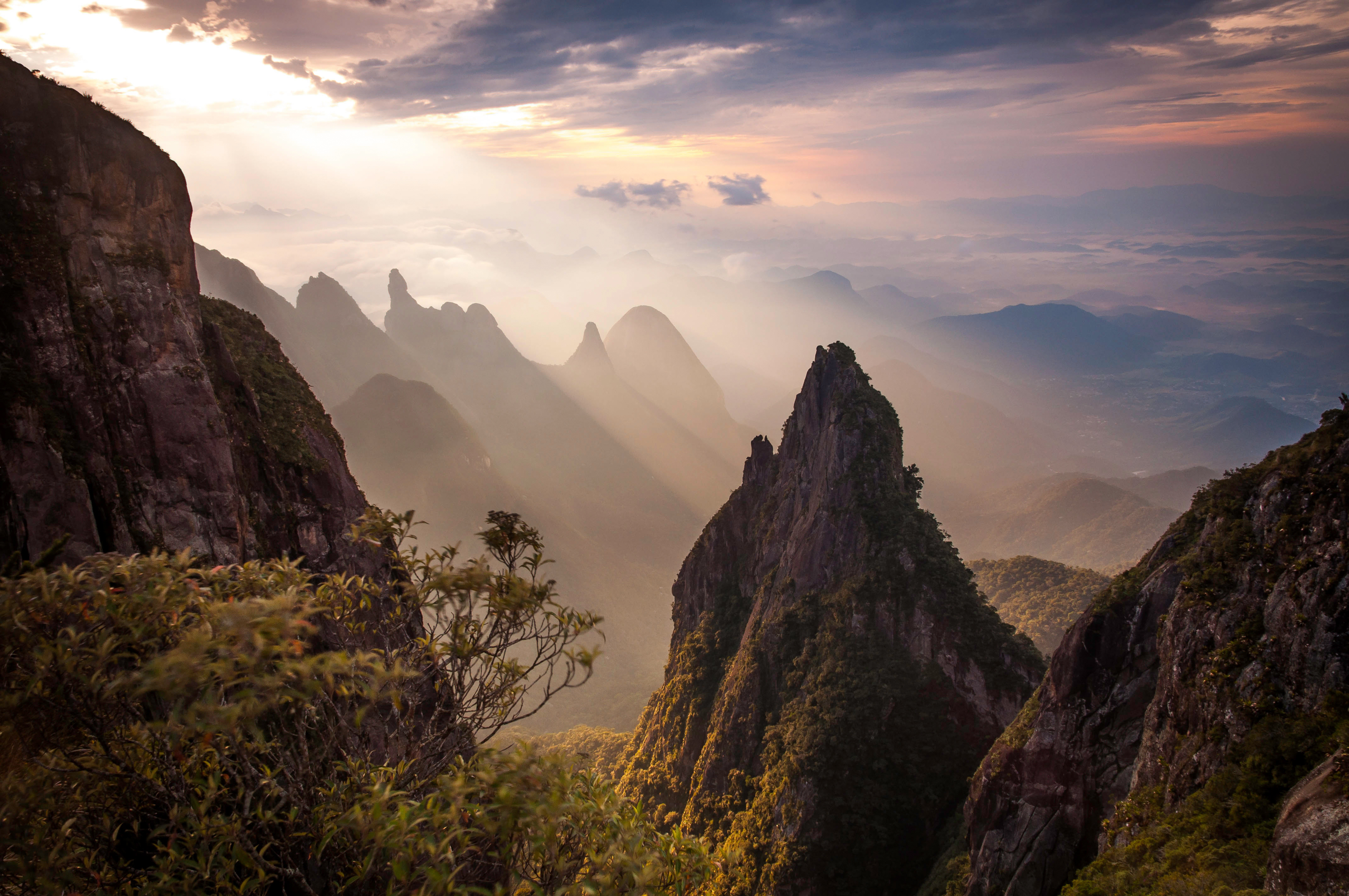
- Rock formations and the God's Finger peak in the background

- Location within Brazil
- Nearest city: Guapimirim
- Coordinates: 22°27′40″S 42°59′49″W
- Area: 10,527 ha (40.64 sq mi)
- Designation: National park (Brazil)
- Created: 1939
- Administrator: Chico Mendes Institute for Biodiversity Conservation

Serra dos Órgãos National Park (Portuguese: Parque Nacional da Serra dos Órgãos: "Organs Range") is a national park in the state of Rio de Janeiro, Brazil. It protects the Serra dos Órgãos mountain range and the water sources in the range. It was the third national park to be created in Brazil.

== Location ==
The Serra dos Órgãos National Park is located about a one-hour drive from the city of Rio de Janeiro. The BR-116 highway leads through the park. The origin of the unusual name is credited to early Portuguese settlers who thought the ensemble of the hill tops resembled the pipes of organs in European cathedrals. The park is part of the larger Serra do Mar chain of mountains, and the most accepted theory about its origin is that it rose about 60 million years ago during earthquakes that caused the Andes to rise.

The Park's area is 10,527 hectares (26,010 acres). It has ten peaks higher than 2,000 metres (6,600 ft) and six other peaks over 1,500 metres (4,900 ft) high. The lowest point in the park is located in the relatively flat municipality of Magé, at 145 metres (476 ft). The highest peak is Pedra do Sino (Bell Rock), at 2,263 metres (7,425 ft). The most famous formation in the park is the Dedo de Deus (God's Finger) peak, which resembles a left hand with its index finger stretched, pointing towards the sky. It is 1,692 metres (5,551 ft) high and can be seen in the background of the flag of Rio de Janeiro state.

== History ==
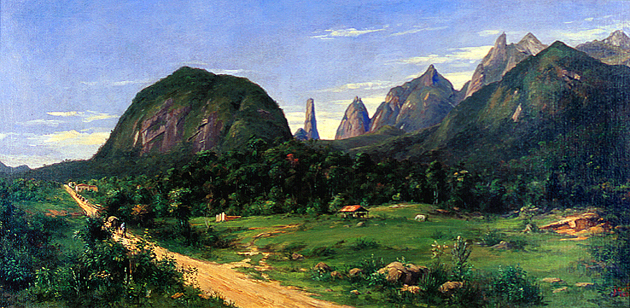
Serra dos Órgãos as seen from Teresópolis, 1885. Oil on canvas by Georg Grimm

The Serra dos Órgãos National Park was created on 30 November 1939 as the third national park in Brazil. (Note: The Itatiaia National Park (1937) and the Iguaçu National Park (1939) are the first two national parks in Brazil.) The purpose of the park was to protect the headwaters of the rivers that flow into the Fluminense basin, and to protect the spectacular mountains. The park was created by the government of Getúlio Vargas by decree law 1822 of 30 November 1939 with an area of about 9,000 hectares (22,000 acres). It covered parts of the municipalities of Magé, Petrópolis and Teresópolis.

Various buildings and other infrastructure were built in the 1940s such as the natural swimming pool, administrative buildings, warehouses, garage, staff quarters and four shelters on the Trilha do Sino (Bell Trail). The park had about 250 employees, including waiters in the mountain shelters. In the 1960s, with the national capital transferred from Rio de Janeiro to Brasilia, the park lost funding and the facilities were allowed to deteriorate. The shelters and some of the staff homes were lost.

Efforts were made to restore the park from 1980, including publication of the management plan and purchase of land to regularize the park's tenure. Decree 90023 of 2 August 1984 delimited the area of the park as 10,527 hectares (26,010 acres). In the 1990s the municipality of Guapimirim was split off from Magé, and also contains the biggest part of the park. From the 1990s the old buildings have been restored and new ones built. The park was included in the Central Rio de Janeiro Atlantic Forest Mosaic, created in 2006.

== Environment ==
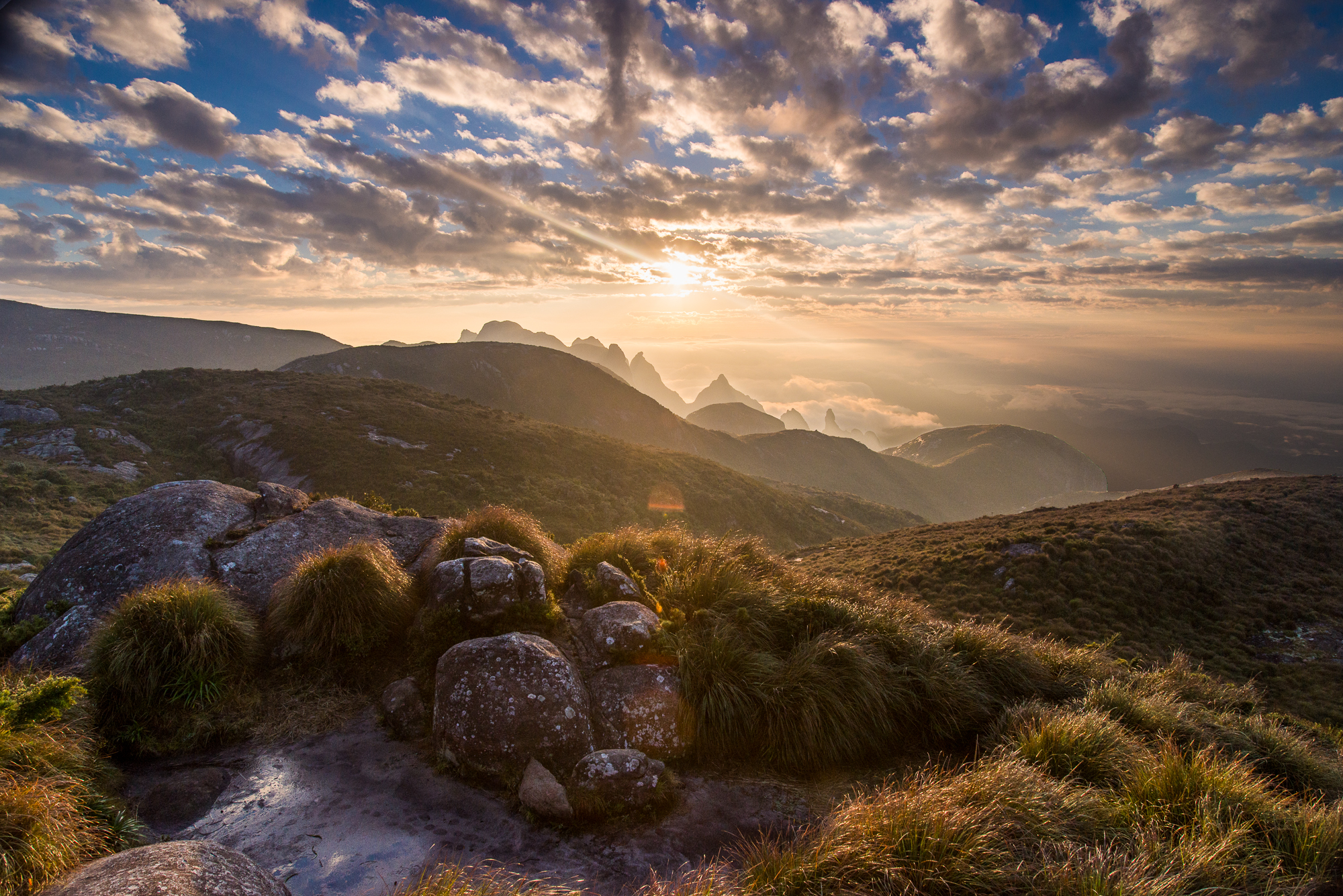
Landscape of the park as seen from the Castelo do Açu peak

The climate is tropical superhumid, with 80% to 90% relative humidity caused by moist air from the Atlantic most of the year. Average temperatures range from 13 to 23 °C (55 to 73 °F), but may reach 38 °C (100 °F) and may fall below freezing in the highest parts. Average rainfall is 1,700 to 3,600 millimetres (67 to 142 in), with more rain in the summer (December to March) and a dry season in the winter from June to August. The south east side facing the ocean receives more rain than the north west side.

The park is in the Atlantic Forest biome, and due to the high rainfall has rich vegetation, much of it unique to this biome. More than 2,800 species of plant have been recorded including 360 of orchids and over 100 bromeliads. Up to 500 metres (1,600 ft) the lower slopes are covered by typical lowland rainforest. From 500 to 1,500 metres (1,600 to 4,900 ft) the vegetation is montane forest, with significant variations depending on the conditions in each area. In many places the upper canopy is 25 to 30 metres (82 to 98 ft) with emergent trees reaching up to 40 metres (130 ft). From 1,500 to 2,000 metres (4,900 to 6,600 ft) there is cloud forest, typically trees of 5 to 10 metres (16 to 33 ft) with crooked trunks covered in epiphytic moss and plants such as bromeliads and orchids. The understory has shrubs and the outcrops are populated by ferns and mosses. There are various endemic species. Above 2,000 metres (6,600 ft) the vegetation is high montane, with open fields and small woody shrubs. 347 species have been found in this environment of which 66 are endemic to this ecosystem. The park is one of the few natural habitats of species of Schlumbergera, which were developed into the colourful "Thanksgiving Cactus" and "Christmas Cactus", widely grown as house plants.

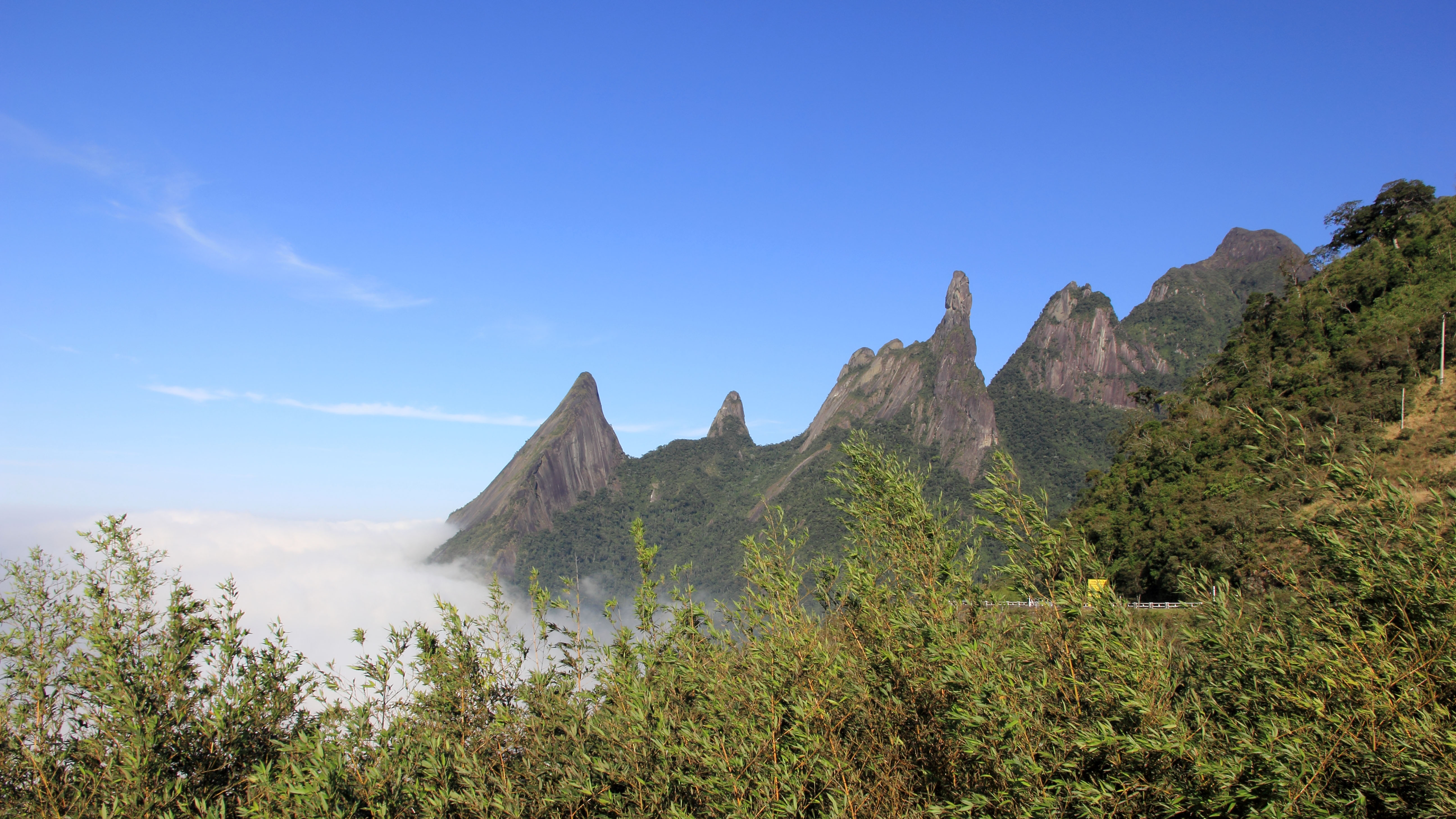
Serra dos Órgãos main peaks (from left to right): Escalavrado (1 406 m), Dedo de Nossa Senhora (1 320 m), Dedo de Deus (1 692 m), Cabeça de Peixe (1 680 m) and Santo Antônio (1 990 m).

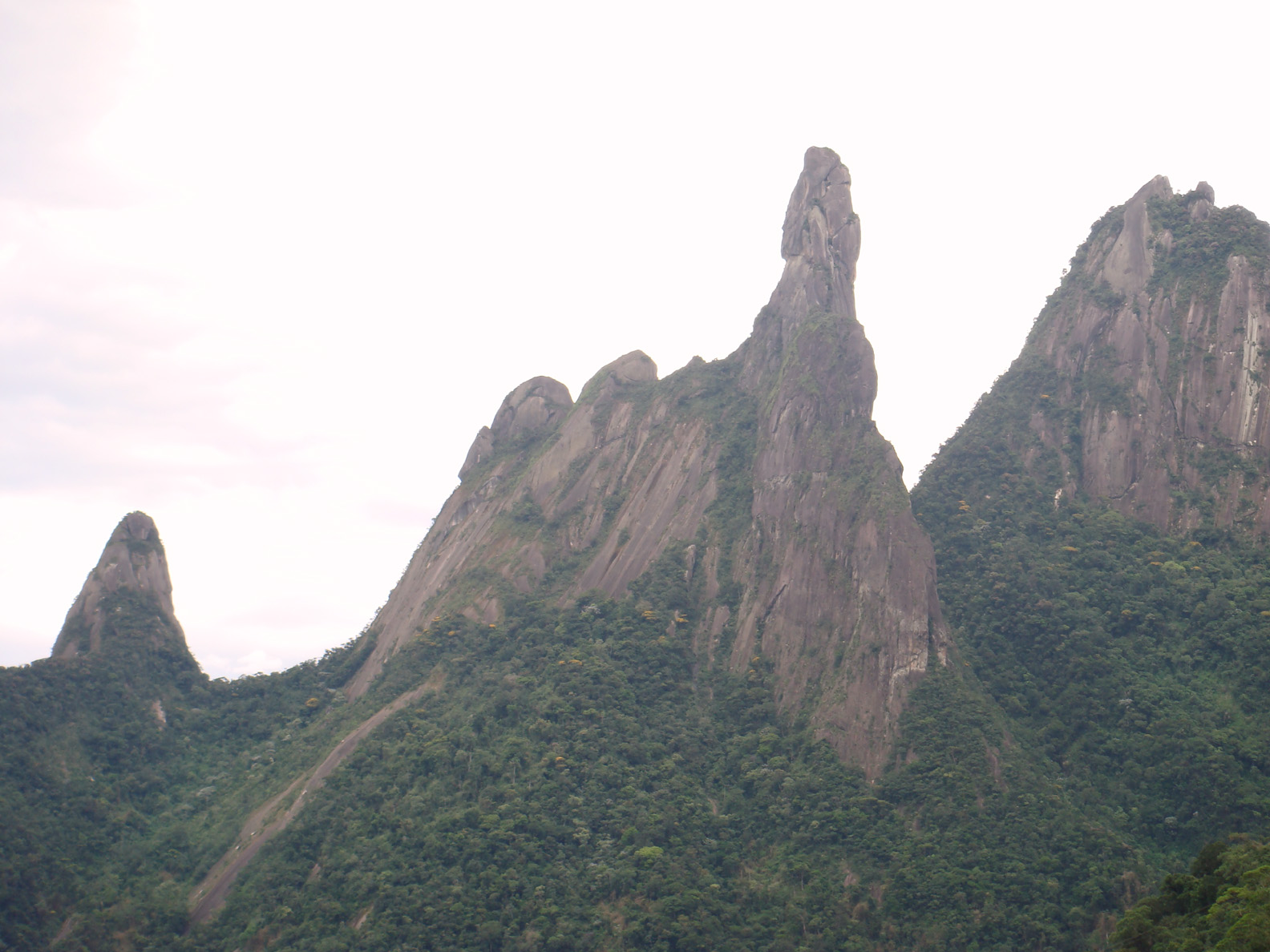
God's Finger (Dedo de Deus)

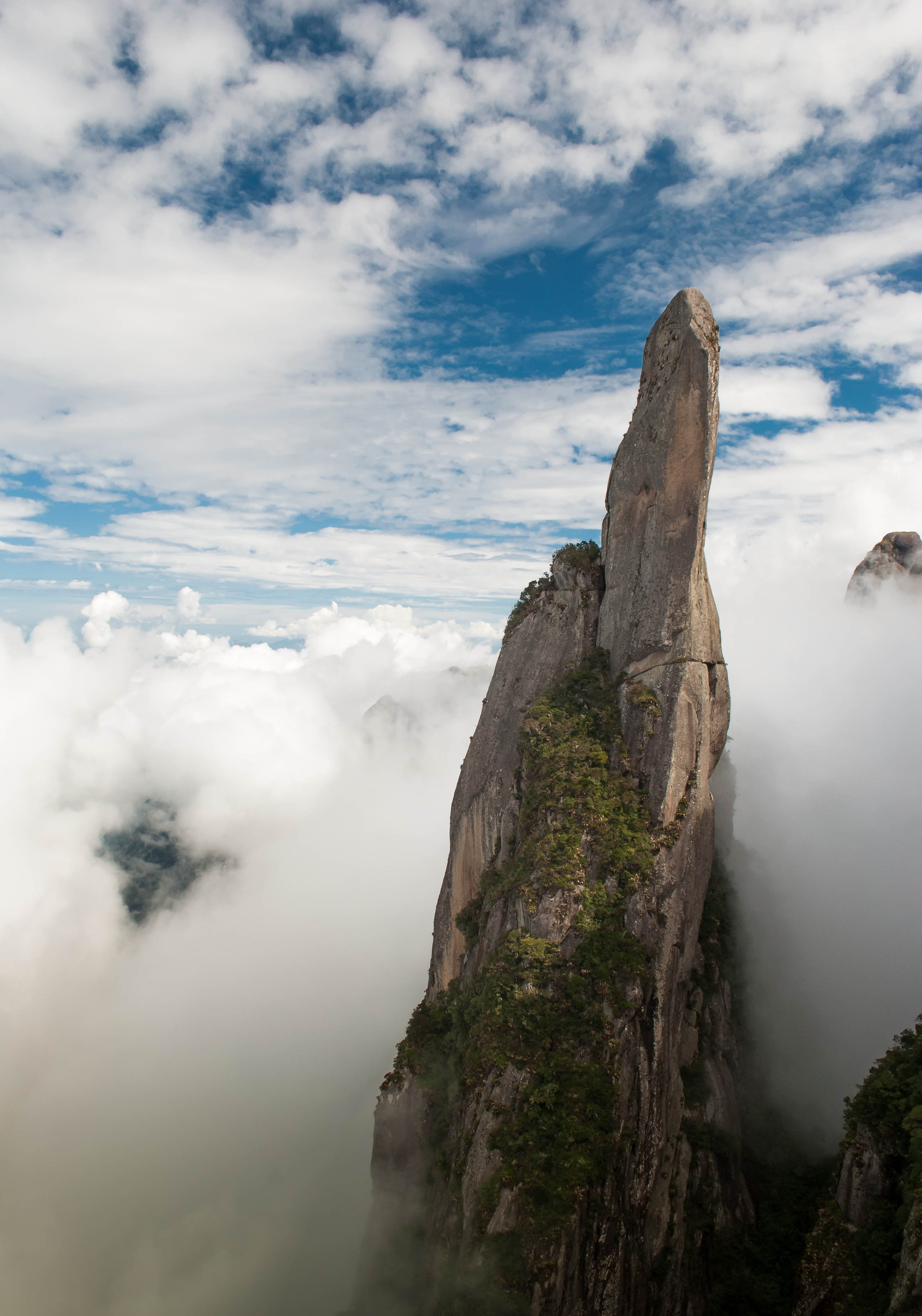
Devil's Needle (Agulha do Diabo), 2050 m

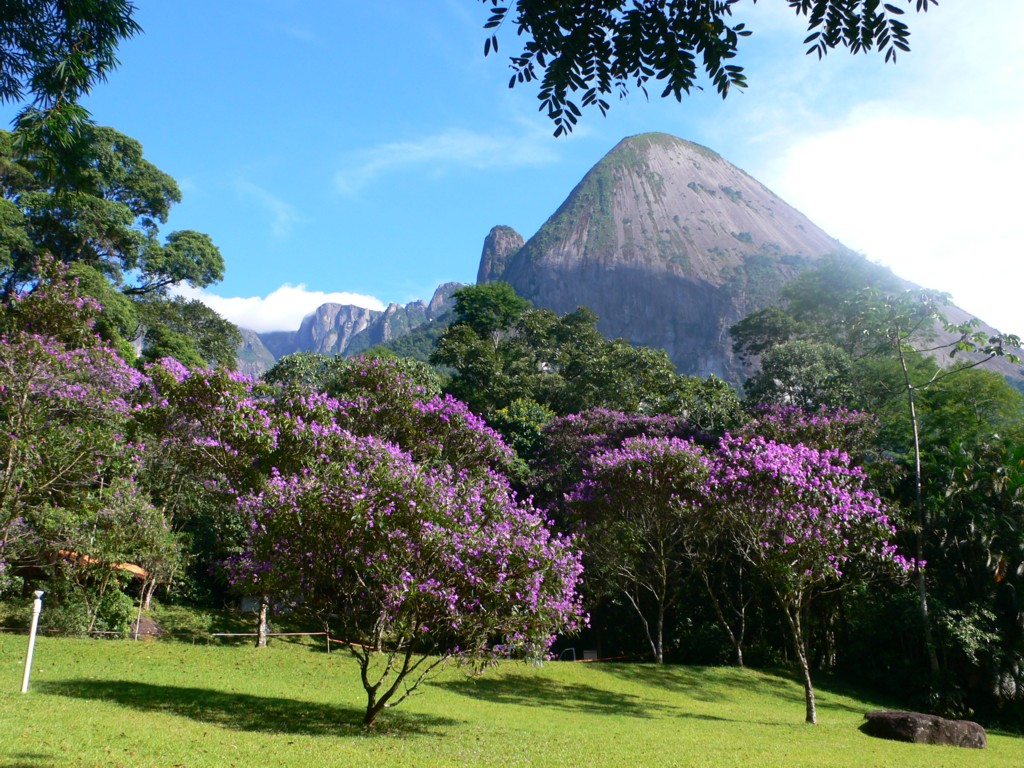
View of the park in Teresópolis, part of the Serra do Mar mountain range

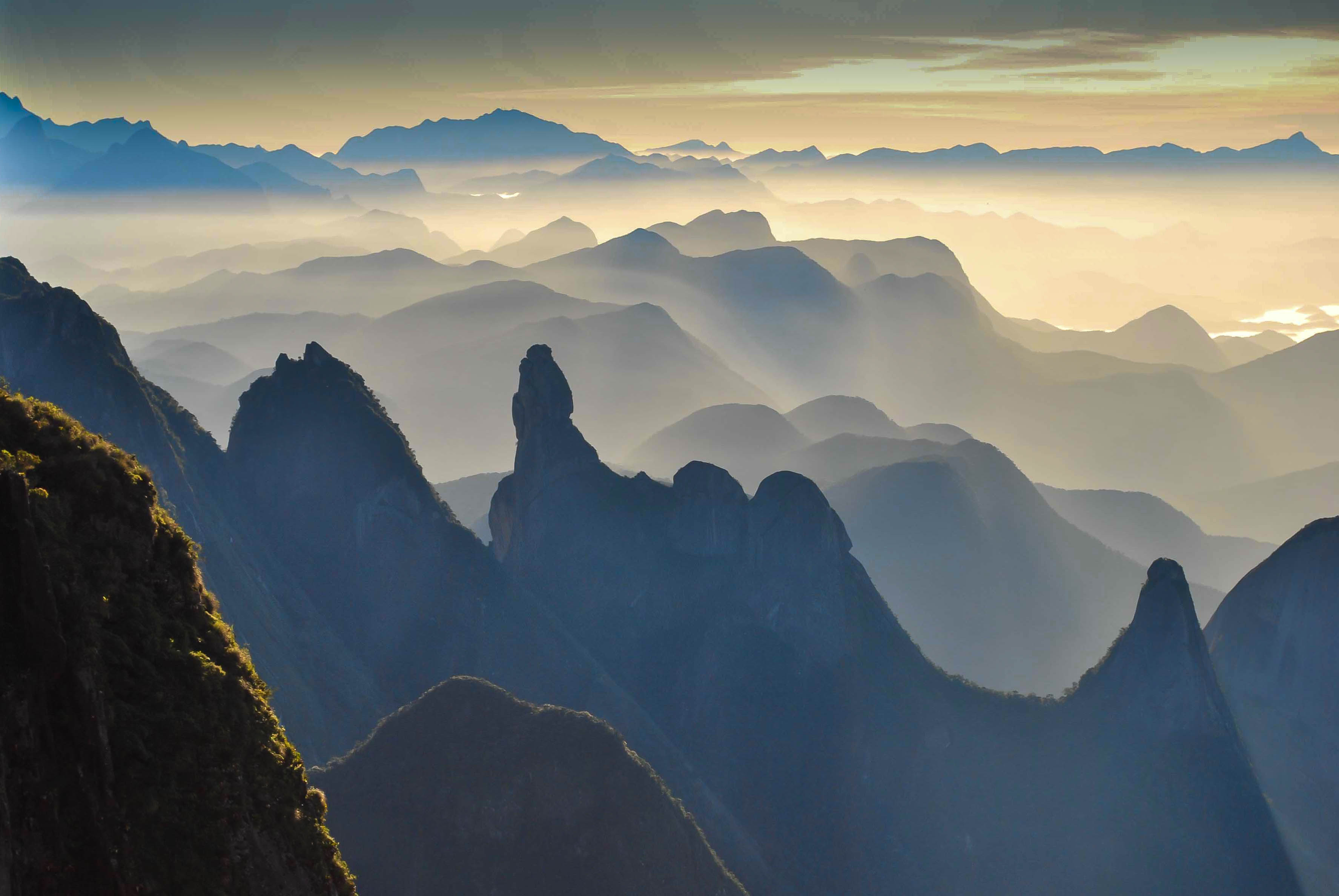
Sunrise

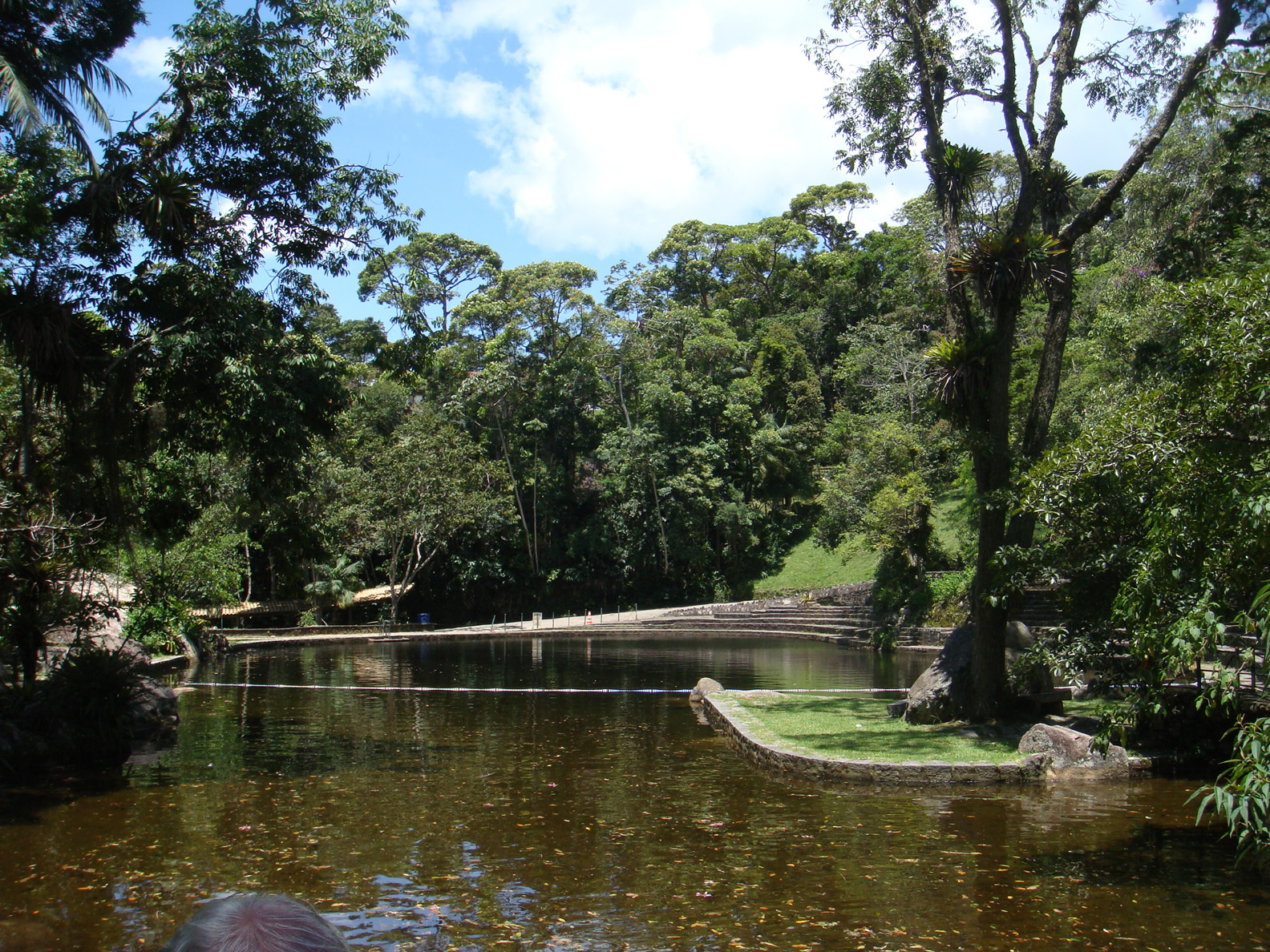
Swimming pool with mineral water

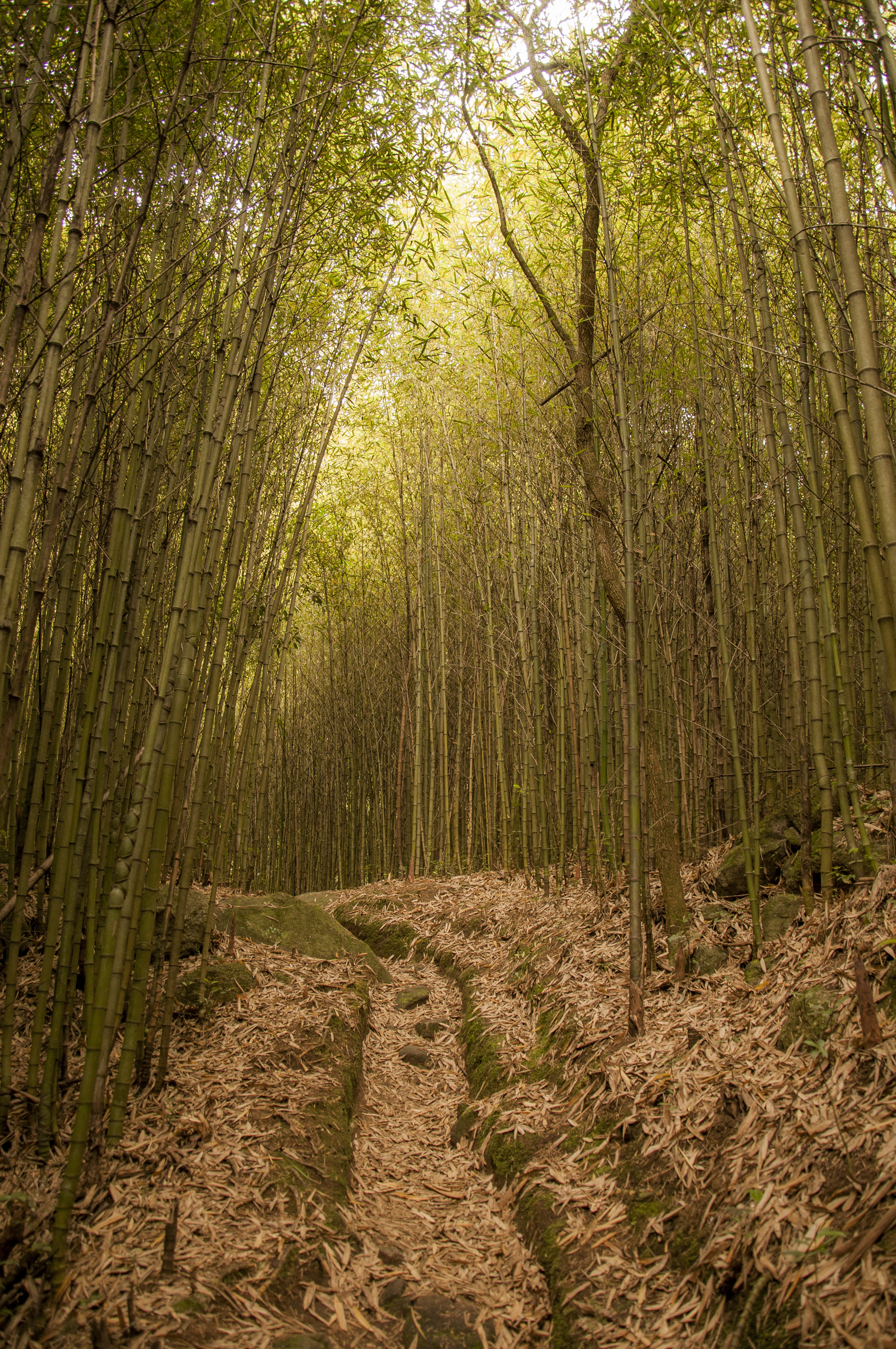
Trail at the park, Petrópolis

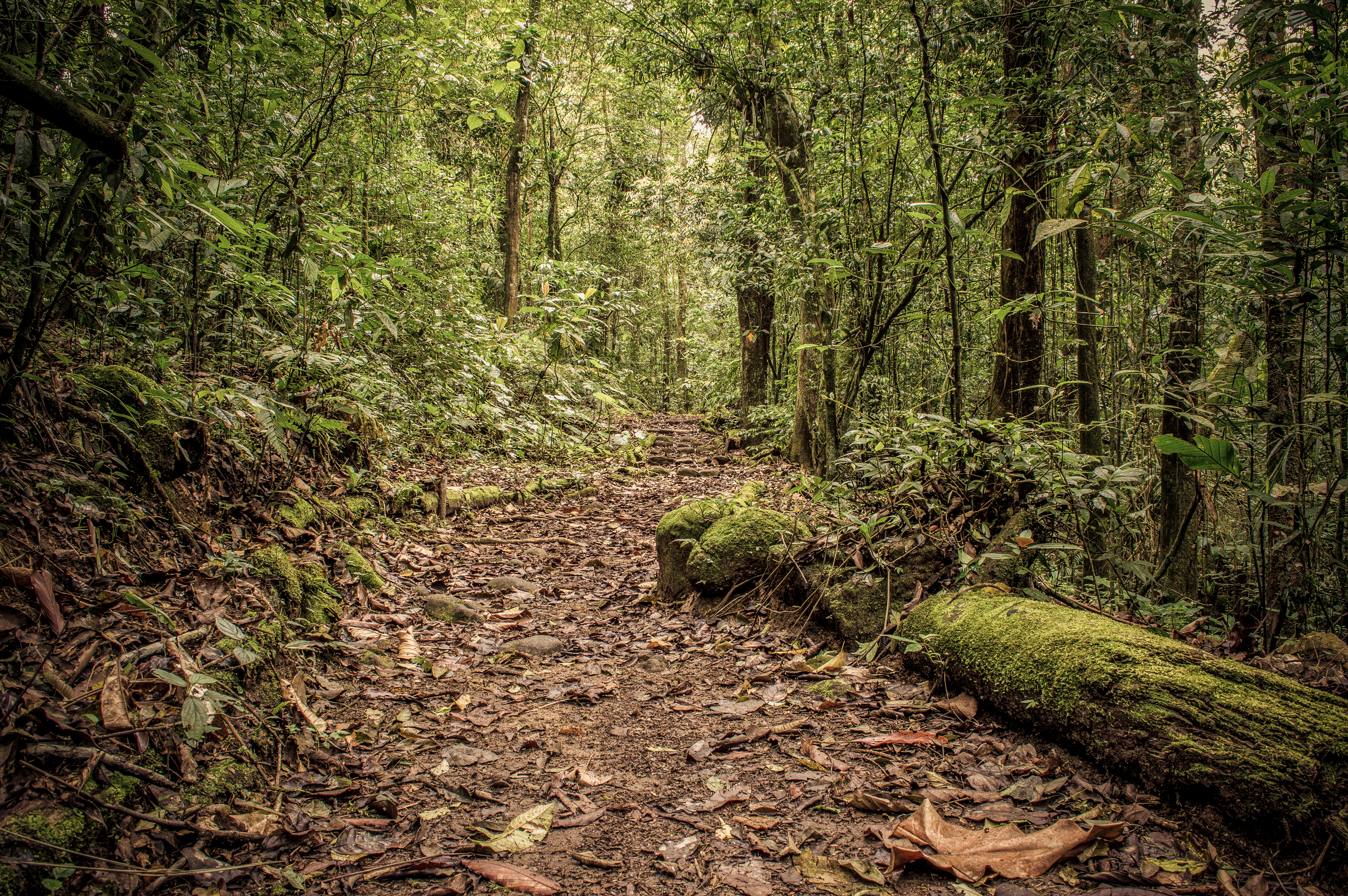
Forest trail in Guapimirim

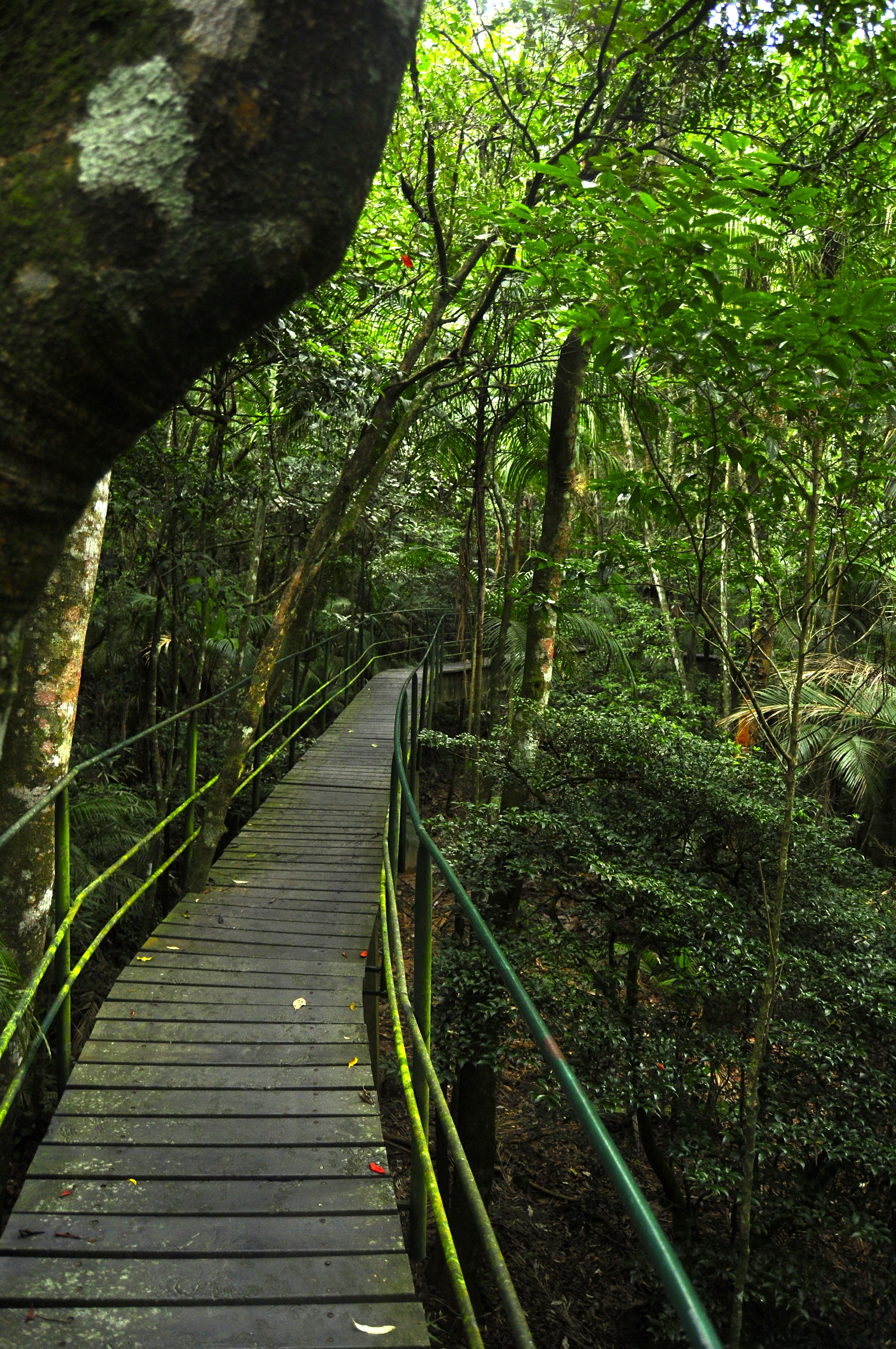
Suspended trail into the woods

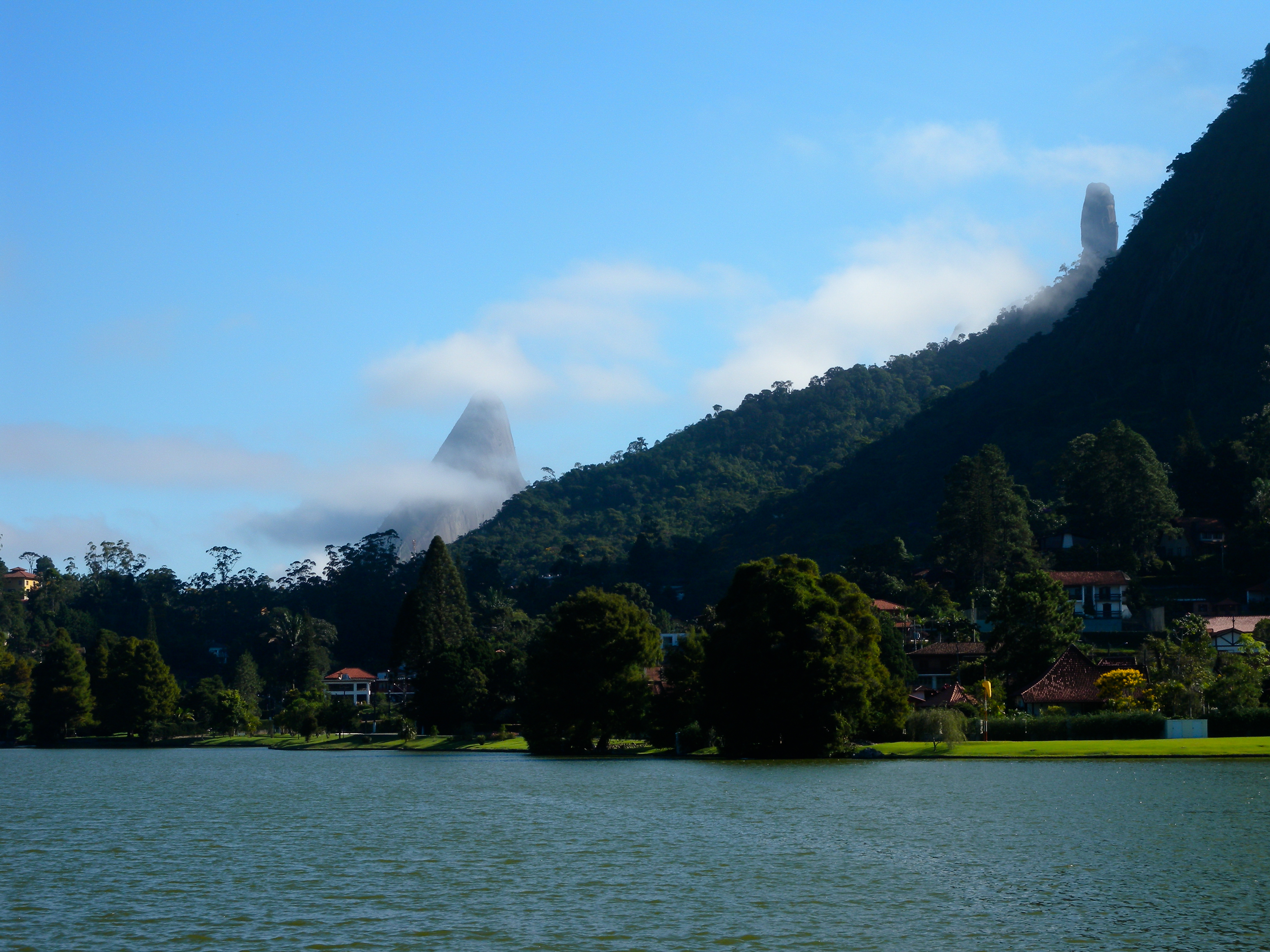
Lake Comary in Teresópolis, with the Escalavrado and the God's Finger (far right) peaks in the background

== Sources ==
- Clima (in Portuguese), Chico Mendes Institute for Biodiversity Conservation, archived from the original on 2016-08-19
- Costa, Cláudia; Lamas, Ivana; Fernandes, Rosan (December 2010), Planejamento Estratégico do Mosaico Central Fluminense (PDF) (in Portuguese), Reserva da Biosfera da Mata Atlântica, archived from the original (PDF) on 2016-10-07
- Flora (in Portuguese), Chico Mendes Institute for Biodiversity Conservation, archived from the original on 2016-08-19
- História (in Portuguese), Chico Mendes Institute for Biodiversity Conservation
- McMillan, A.J.S.; Horobin, J.F. (1995), Christmas Cacti : The genus Schlumbergera and its hybrids (p/b ed.), Sherbourne, Dorset: David Hunt, ISBN 978-0-9517234-6-3
