= Suruí Environmental Protection Area =

Environmental Protection Area in Rio de Janeiro, Brazil

- Área de Proteção Ambiental Municipal de Suruí
- IUCN category V (protected landscape/seascape)
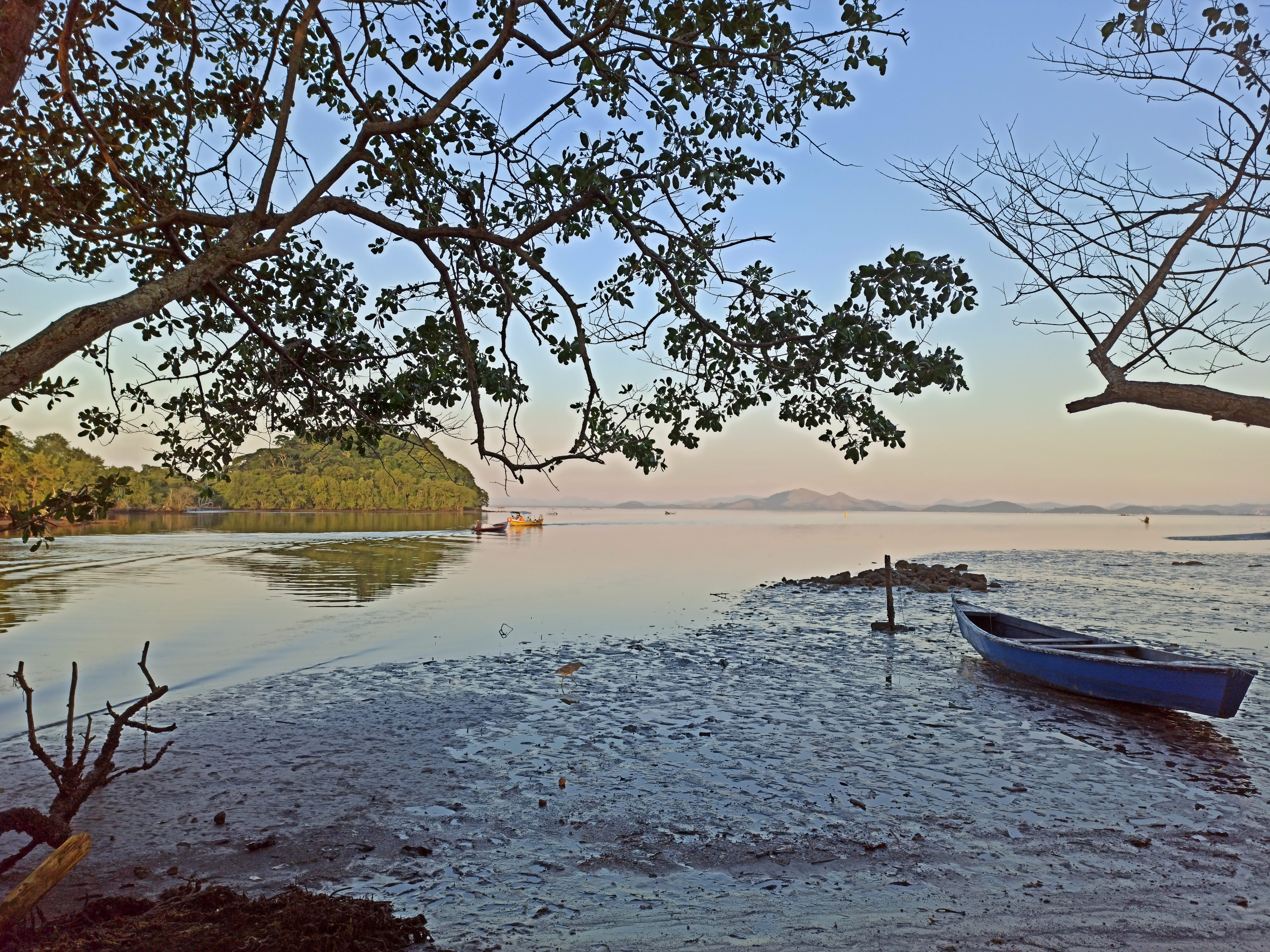

- Location within Brazil
- Nearest city: Magé, Rio de Janeiro
- Coordinates: 22°39′24″S 43°08′40″W
- Area: 14,146 hectares (34,960 acres)
- Designation: Environmental protection area
- Created: 22 May 2007

The Suruí Environmental Protection Area (Portuguese: Área de Proteção Ambiental Municipal de Suruí) is a municipal Environmental protection area in the state of Rio de Janeiro, Brazil.

== Location ==
The Suruí Environmental Protection Area (APA) is in the municipality of Magé, Rio de Janeiro. It is named after the Suruí River. The APA was defined with an area of 14,146 hectares (34,960 acres). (Note: From the polygon describing the APA the area is 14,150.3 hectares (34,966 acres).) The region is one of forests, rivers and waterfalls, and is popular as an informal tourist destination. The APA includes remnants of Atlantic Forest, well-preserved mangroves and historical monuments. It contains the Colégio Estadual Agrícola Almirante Ernani do Amaral Peixoto, a state agricultural college.

== History ==
The Suruí Environmental Protection Area was created by municipal decree 2.300 of 22 May 2007. It was explicitly created by the municipal environment secretariat so as to obtain the benefits of compensation for environmental damage by the Complexo Petroquímico do Rio de Janeiro (Comperj – Petrochemical Complex of the State of Rio de Janeiro). The APA has the purpose of reconnecting the forests between the Serra dos Órgãos and the lowland mangroves. It is threatened by unplanned urban expansion of the Rio de Janeiro metropolitan arc. The APA is part of the Central Rio de Janeiro Atlantic Forest Mosaic, created in 2006.

== Sources ==
- Carvalho, Fabrício Castro de (2011), Turismo no Rio: uma odisseia por espaços sustentáveis (in Portuguese), Editora E-papers, ISBN 978-85-7650-314-9
- Costa, Cláudia; Lamas, Ivana; Fernandes, Rosan (December 2010), Planejamento Estratégico do Mosaico Central Fluminense (PDF) (in Portuguese), Reserva da Biosfera da Mata Atlântica
- "Educação e preocupação ambiental além dos muros escolares", Informativo do Complexo Petroquímico do Rio de Janeiro (in Portuguese), Ano III (31), Comperj, May 2012
- Fadel, Simone; Rangel Tavares, Felipe; Lima Souza, Gabriel de (2014), Estado, poder e conflitos: análise do impacto espacial de áreas protegidas (in Portuguese)
- Herrera, Breno (2012), Mosaico da Mata Atlântica Central Fluminense: Experiência do Planejamento Estratégico (PDF) (in Portuguese), ICMBio: Instituto Chico Mendes
- Zonas do Mosaico Central Fluminense (PDF) (in Portuguese), 2012
