= Miguel Pereira, Rio de Janeiro =

Miguel Pereira
- Municipality
- City of Miguel Pereira
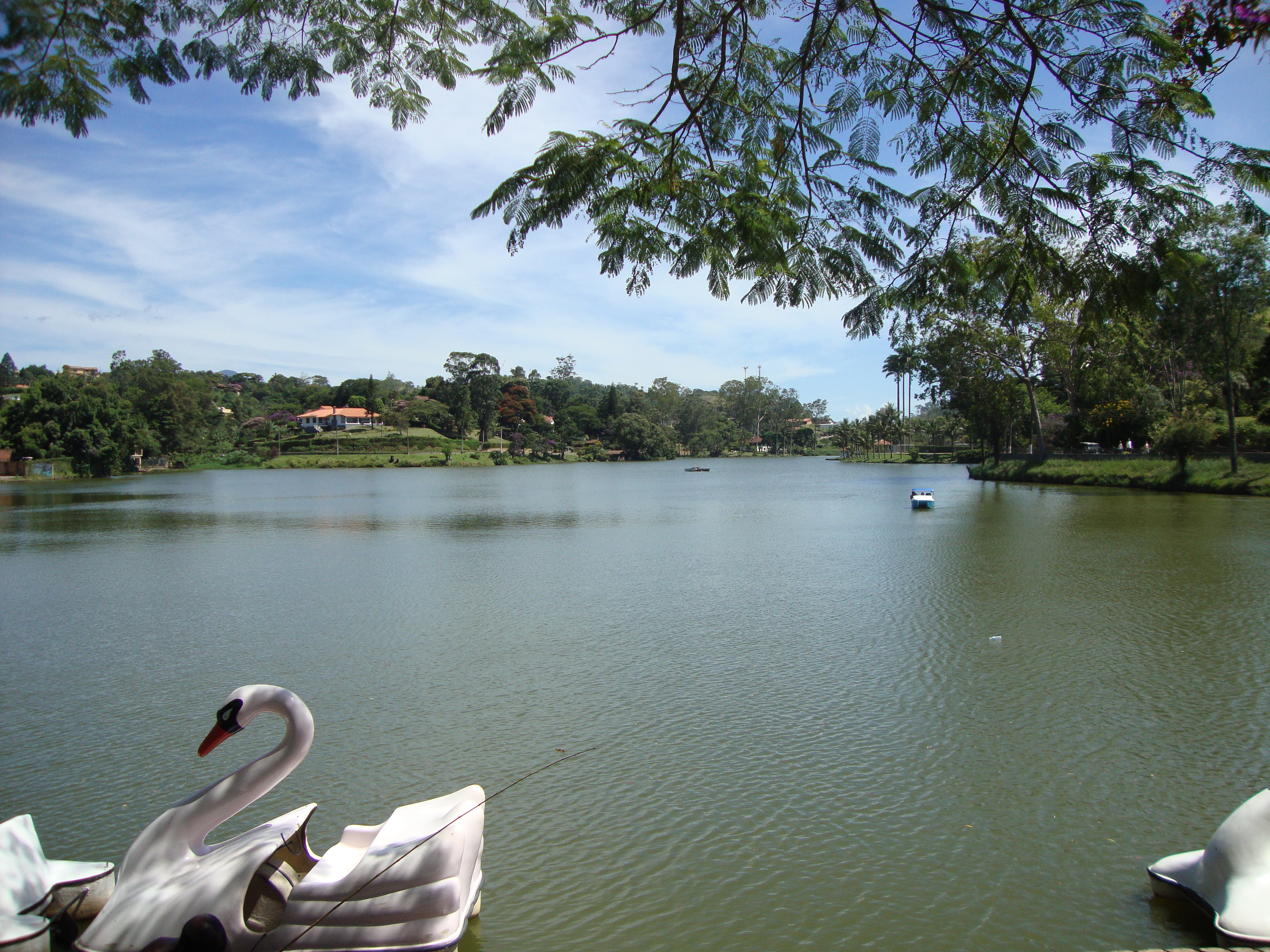
- Javary Lake

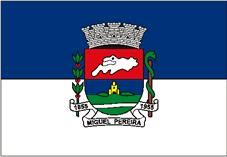
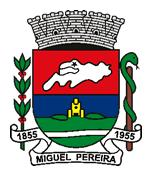
- Flag Coat of arms

- Location of Miguel Pereira in the state of Rio de Janeiro

- Location of Miguel Pereira in Brazil
- Coordinates: 22°27′14″S 43°28′08″W
- Country: Brazil
- Region: Southeast
- State: Rio de Janeiro

Government
  - Mayor: André Português (PSC)

Area
  - Total: 287.356 km^{2} (110.949 sq mi)
- Elevation: 618 m (2,028 ft)

Population (2020)
  - Total: 25,582
- Time zone: UTC-3 (UTC-3)
- Website: www.pmmp.rj.gov.br

Miguel Pereira (Portuguese pronunciation: [miˈɡɛw peˈɾejɾɐ]) is a municipality located in the Brazilian state of Rio de Janeiro. This city is located in a mountainous area and has gotten the title of climatic health resort. This municipality is known for its climate, rivers, water falls and the cleanliness of the water. Miguel Pereira supplies Baixada Fluminense and a great part of the city of Rio de Janeiro with potable water.

The city contains part of the Central Rio de Janeiro Atlantic Forest Mosaic of conservation units, created in 2006.

== History ==
Until the 1700s, the region was inhabited by crowned Indians (puris). In that century, the missionary agents to be villaged in religious[8]

The historical evolution of Miguel Pereira is linked to that of Vassouras and Paty do Alferes, and to the expansion of coffee culture in the Rio Paraíba do Sul valley.

Miguel Pereira's occupation of European origin originated in the first explorations of European descendants who aimed to transport the Serra do Mar. and like Minas Gerais.

The drovers who went up the Rio das Mortes towards Sacra Família do Tinguá (currently a district of the municipality of Engenheiro Paulo de Frontin), fixed a crossing point in a small floodplain. Initially, the place was known as Barreiros or Tejuco, because, there, they got bogged down like troops of donkeys that traveled the New Way. Later, it started to be called Estiva, the name of a bamboo weave that the drovers used to place in the donkeys' paths, thus, conquering the mud on their journey.

Some small delights located in the region during the 18th century. These produce sugar or, more often, foodstuffs for consumption in Rio de Janeiro. In 1770, the Fazenda da Piedade dea Cruz was founded, which would become important as a coffee producer in the region. As lands of the current municipality of Miguel Pereira, they were, then, administratively and religiously subordinated to the Parish of Nossa Senhora da Conceição do Alferes, current Paty do Alferes.

Coffee plantations expanded at the beginning of the 19th century, powered by slave labor, constituting a factor of progress and sharp dynamism of the local economy. This development spurt motivated the parish to be elevated to the position of village of Nossa Senhora da Conceição do Alferes, in 1820. However, soon after, in 1837, the village headquarters was transferred to the village of Vassouras, returning Paty do Ensign to the condition of parish. In 1857, the village of Vassouras was transformed into a city and seat of the municipality that administered the current lands of Miguel Pereira.

The development of the region was only in the coffee farms, with practically no urban development. It was only after the construction of the Capela do Santo Antônio in 1898 that the settlers of Estiva began to build their humble houses and form an incipient commerce in an urban nucleus, thus encouraging the arrival of new residents to the place.

Despite suffering economic decline due to the abolition of slavery in 1888 and the depletion of land due to inadequate exploitation of coffee plantations, urban development was boosted at the beginning of the 20th century, when the line of Estrada de Ferro Melhoramentos (incorporated to the Central do Brasil Railroad in 1903), which, starting from Japeri, in the Baixada Fluminense, reached the Paraíba do Sul River in the city of Paraíba do Sul. The railway axis stimulated the birth of settlements that, for the most part, housed the railroad workers themselves. This is the case of Governador Portela, where part of the urban areas was owned by the Federal Railroad Network (RFFSA), which built an entire residential village for railway workers. This feature is responsible for the development of the district headquarters that would take place before Estiva, currently Miguel Pereira.

The urbanization of the areas adjacent to the Estiva station would take place in the 1930s, when the qualities of the region's climate were propagated by the doctor and professor Miguel Pereira, who would later give the city its name.

Since then, urban occupation would have, as its main vector, summer tourism, which attracted and still attracts the population of the Metropolitan Region of Rio de Janeiro. The original access by rail would be accompanied in the 1950s by a highway, whose subsequent paving represented a great stimulus to the urban and tourist development of the area.

According to the administrative division of 1943, the municipality of Vassouras was formed by eleven districts, including those of Miguel Pereira, Governador Portela and Conrado. In 1955, the first two districts were dismembered from Vassouras, in order to form the municipality of Miguel Pereira, which thus achieved emancipation, under Law nº 2 626, of October 25 of that year, and was installed on 26 July 1956. In 1988, Conrado was also attached to Miguel Pereira.

== Geography ==
According to the regional division in force since 2017, established by the IBGE, the municipality belongs to the Intermediate Geographic Regions of Volta Redonda-Barra Mansa and Immediate of Valença. Until then, with the existence of divisions into microregions and mesoregions, it was part of the Vassouras microregion, which in turn was included in the Metropolitan mesoregion of Rio de Janeiro.

It is located at 22º27'14" south latitude and 43º28'08" west longitude, at an altitude of 618 meters. It is in an area of Atlantic Forest, a mountainous areas which has biodiverse fauna and flora, as well as rivers and waterfalls.

It is known for the quality of its production of milk and dairy products, bay leaves, flowers, sweets, handicrafts, sausages and cachaça.

=== Climate ===
Miguel Pereira has a Tropical Altitude Cwa climate, with an average maximum in the summer of 24.6 degrees Celsius, and an average of minimum in the summer of 17.6 degrees. In winter, the average maximum is 18.7 and the average minimum is 10.3. With maximum recorded temperature of 35.7 and minimum recorded temperature of climatic resort.

=== Hydrography ===
Between the first and second districts is Lake Javary, formed by the damming of the Córrego do Saco in the town of Barão de Javary, occupies an extensive area and has a rustic bridge connecting its banks. It is one of the city's postcards and its access is facilitated by being on the way to the center and with one of its banks being bordered by the RJ-125, the main avenue of the city.

In the area of the Tinguá Biological Reserve, the source of the Rio Santana is located, which is part of a water system of the Rio Guandu that feeds the Baixada Fluminense and a good part of Rio de Janeiro with drinking water. The reserve also has a water treatment plant from the time of the Empire, from which most of the city's drinking water came.
