= Guanabara Ecological Station =

- Estação Ecológica da Guanabara
- IUCN category Ia (strict nature reserve)
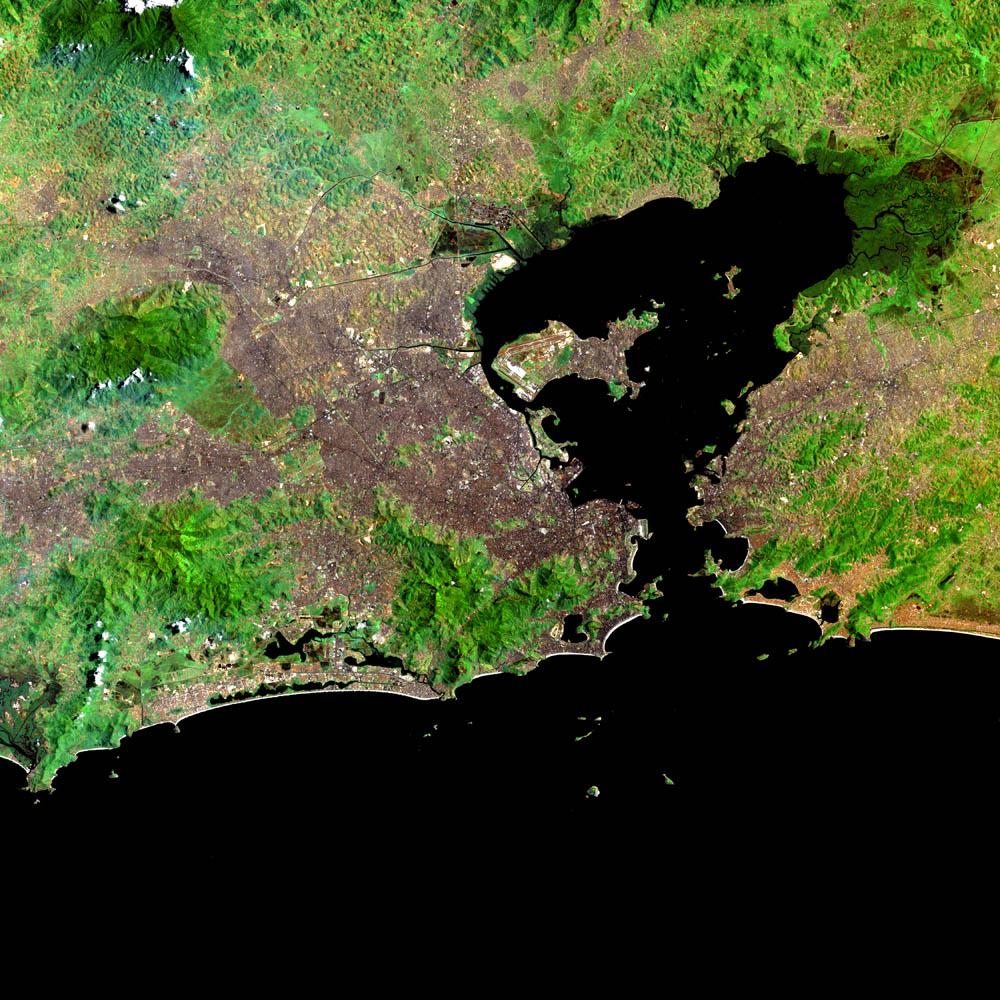
- Rio de Janeiro and Guanabara Bay. The protected area is in the upper right. The mangroves are dark green.

- Location within Brazil
- Nearest city: Guapimirim, Rio de Janeiro
- Coordinates: 22.719049°S 43.015040°W
- Area: 1,936 hectares (4,780 acres)
- Designation: Ecological station
- Created: 15 February 2006
- Administrator: Chico Mendes Institute for Biodiversity Conservation
- Website: www.icmbio.gov.br/apaguapimirim/

The Guanabara Ecological Station (Portuguese: Estação Ecológica da Guanabara) is an ecological station in the state of Rio de Janeiro, Brazil. It protects an area of mangroves in Guanabara Bay, not far from the city of Rio de Janeiro.

== Location ==
The Guanabara Ecological Station (ESEC) is divided between the municipalities of Guapimirim (42.49%), Itaboraí (35.61%) and São Gonçalo (3.57%) in Rio de Janeiro. It has an area of 1,936 hectares (4,780 acres) in the coastal marine biome. The ESEC protects an area of mangroves in the northeast of Guanabara Bay. It is entirely surrounded by the Guapi-Mirim Environmental Protection Area (APA). The ESEC covers the best preserved area of Guanabara Bay, with the least amount of human intervention. Management of the ESEC and the APA is integrated, with shared technical, material and financial resources.

== Environment ==
The ESEC is at sea level. It receives water from the Guapi-Macacu, Macacu/Caceribu and Guaxindiba rivers. Temperatures range from 9 to 41 °C (48 to 106 °F) with an average of 24 °C (75 °F). The ESEC contains a flat tidal region of fluvial-marine sediments, rich in organic matter, that supports the mangroves. These almost completely cover the ESEC and are either primary growth or secondary growth in an advanced stage of regeneration. The main species of mangrove are the Rhizophora mangle, Avicennia schaueriana and Laguncularia racemosa. In areas cleared by people there are invasive species such as Hibiscus pernambucensis, Acrostichum aureum and Typha species. Spartina alterniflora grasses and floating islands of Eichhornia crassipes are also found. Migratory birds include the osprey (Pandion haliaetus), semipalmated plover (Charadrius semipalmatus) and spotted sandpiper (Actitis macularius).

== History ==
Before the ESEC was created the area was considered a naval area that could not be occupied, but despite this there were constant attacks on the environment. The scientific community joined with the representatives of the local community in a movement to protect the eastern portion of Guanabara Bay with its precious remnants of mangroves. This resulted in a technical study recommending an environmental protection area, and presidential decree 90.225 of 25 September 1984 established the Guapi-Mirim Environmental Protection Area, while the area that would become the ESEC was designated a Wildlife Protection Zone, with a higher level of protection. Due to the unique importance of the environments between the mouths of the Guaxindiba and the Guapi / Macacu rivers, the Brazilian Institute of Environment and Renewable Natural Resources (IBAMA) recommended creation of an ESEC to fully protect the area, which would result in increased marine life in the area and ensure sustainability of traditional extractive activities.

The Guanabara Ecological Station was created by federal decree on 15 February 2006 with the objective of preserving remnants of mangroves in Guanabara Bay and the associated fauna and flora, and to support scientific research. It is administered by the Chico Mendes Institute for Biodiversity Conservation. The ESEC is classed as IUCN protected area category Ia (strict nature reserve). The park was included in the Central Rio de Janeiro Atlantic Forest Mosaic, created in December 2006. The consultative council was created on 29 June 2011. The management plan was approved on 2 March 2012. An ordinance of 4 July 2012 defined criteria for allowing visits for recreational, educational or scientific research purposes in the APA, and for educational or research purposes in the ESEC.

== Sources ==
- Costa, Cláudia; Lamas, Ivana; Fernandes, Rosan (December 2010), Planejamento Estratégico do Mosaico Central Fluminense (PDF) (in Portuguese), Reserva da Biosfera da Mata Atlântica, archived from the original (PDF) on 2016-10-07
- Esec da Guanabara (in Portuguese), ICMBio: Chico Mendes Institute for Biodiversity Conservation
- ESEC da Guanabara (in Portuguese), ISA: Instituto Socioambiental
- Unidade de Conservação: Estação Ecológica da Guanabara (in Portuguese), MMA: Ministério do Meio Ambiente
