= Suruí River =

- Location within Brazil
- Native name: Rio Suruí (Portuguese)

Location
- Country: Brazil

Physical characteristics
- Source
  - location: Rio de Janeiro state
- Mouth
  - location: Guanabara Bay
  - coordinates: 22.693387°S 43.111574°W

The Suruí River (Portuguese: Rio Suruí) is a river of Rio de Janeiro state in southeastern Brazil.

== Course ==
The Suruí River flows through the Suruí Environmental Protection Area in the municipality of Magé, Rio de Janeiro. It gives its name to the Suruí district of Magé. It empties into Guanabara Bay.

== See also ==
- List of rivers of Rio de Janeiro

== Sources ==
- Herrera, Breno (2012), Mosaico da Mata Atlântica Central Fluminense: Experiência do Planejamento Estratégico (PDF) (in Portuguese), ICMBio: Instituto Chico Mendes
