= Central Rio de Janeiro Atlantic Forest Mosaic =

Collection of protected areas in Brazil

- Mosaico da Mata Atlântica Central Fluminense
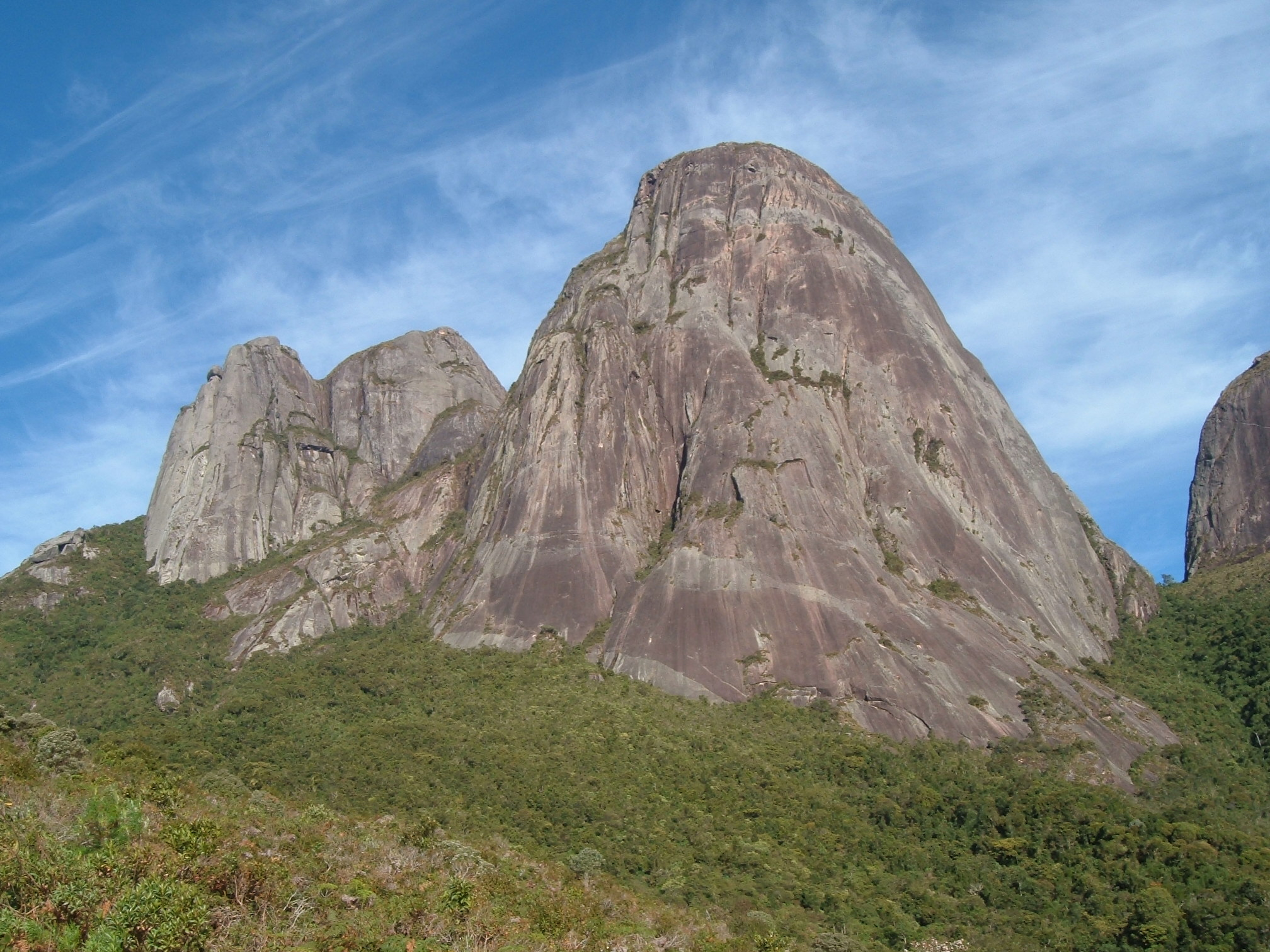
- Três Picos - Highest point of the mosaic

- Location within Brazil
- Nearest city: Rio de Janeiro
- Coordinates: 22.414°S 42.614°W
- Area: 295,723 hectares (730,750 acres)
- Designation: Protected area mosaic
- Created: 11 December 2006

The Central Rio de Janeiro Atlantic Forest Mosaic (Portuguese: Mosaico da Mata Atlântica Central Fluminense) is a protected area mosaic in the state of Rio de Janeiro, Brazil. The mosaic is inland, to the east of the city of Rio de Janeiro.

== History ==
A project to create three new protected area mosaics in the Serra do Mar Ecological Corridor began in December 2005, coordinated by the National Council of the Atlantic Forest Biosphere Reserve. These were the Bocaina Mosaic, Central Rio de Janeiro Atlantic Forest Mosaic and Mantiqueira Mosaic. Funding was provided by Conservation International, the Fund for the Global Environment Facility, the Government of Japan, the MacArthur Foundation and the World Bank. The Central Coastal Atlantic Forest Mosaic was recognized by the Ministry of the Environment on 11 December 2006. There were originally 22 conservation units in the mosaic. Others were added, and as of 2010 there were 29 units, with a total area of 295,723 hectares (730,750 acres). The strategic plan was developed in 2010.

== Extent ==
The Central Rio de Janeiro Atlantic Forest Mosaic encompasses 14 municipalities: Bom Jardim, Cachoeiras de Macacu, Casimiro de Abreu, Duque de Caxias, Guapimirim, Itaboraí, Macaé, Magé, Miguel Pereira, Nova Friburgo, Nova Iguaçu, Petrópolis, Rio Bonito, São Gonçalo, São José do Vale do Rio Preto, Silva Jardim, Teresópolis and Tanguá.

== Environment ==
Altitudes range from sea level at the Guanabara Bay to 2,316 metres (7,598 ft) in the Três Picos State Park, with different degrees of human occupation, resulting in great diversity of environments and landscapes. The land in the lower regions was formed by sediments deposited by the rivers and the sea. In the coastal areas there are several meandering rivers that deposit fine sediment carried from the mountains, creating an ideal environment for the growth of mangroves, which are concentrated in the Guapimirim Environmental Protection Area and the Guanabara Ecological Station. Further from the shore there are patches of dense alluvial rainforest. Further back again this starts to merge into dense lowland and sub-montane rainforest in the Bacia do Rio Macacu, Guapi-Guapiaçu and Suruí environmental protection areas.

Further inland, as the land rises, there are fragments of dense montane forest, dense high montane forest and alpine meadows. To the north of the mosaic there are patches of submontane and montane seasonal forest. Originally the most common form of vegetation in the mosaic was dense lowland rainforest, followed by dense submontane and montane rainforest. The semideciduous montane forest and alpine meadows were the least common. The native vegetation has been subject to exploitation and destruction for several centuries. Today there are 511 fragments of forest and mangroves, with an area of 177,557 hectares (438,750 acres).

== Conservation units ==
Conservation units in the mosaic include:

Unit	Type	Area (ha)	Level	Municipalities	Created
Araponga	Municipal nature park	1,376	Municipal	São José do Vale do Rio Preto	2006
Araras	Biological reserve	3,862	State	Petrópolis	1977
Bacia do Rio Macacu	Environmental protection area	19,508	State	Cachoeiras de Macacu, Guapimirim, Itaboraí, Magé	2002
Bacia dos Frades	Environmental protection area	7,500	State	Teresópolis	1990
CEC-Tinguá	Private natural heritage reserve	16	Federal	Tinguá	2003
El Nagal	Private natural heritage reserve	17	Federal	Magé	
Fazenda Suspiro	Private natural heritage reserve	18	Federal	Teresópolis	1999
Floresta do Jacarandá	Environmental protection area	2,700	State	Teresópolis	1985
Graziela Maciel Barroso	Private natural heritage reserve	184	Federal	Petrópolis	2005
Guanabara	Ecological station	1,935	Federal	Guapimirim, São Gonçalo	2006
Guapi-Guapiaçú	Environmental protection area	15,538	Municipal	Guapimirim	2004
Guapimirim	Environmental protection area	13,825	Federal	Guapimirim, Itaboraí, Magé, São Gonçalo	1984
Macaé de Cima	Environmental protection area	35,037	State	Nova Friburgo, Silva Jardim	2001
Maravilha	Environmental protection area	1,700	Municipal	São José do Vale do Rio Preto	2006
Montanhas de Teresópolis	Municipal nature park	4,397	Municipal	Teresópolis	2009
Montes das Flores	Ecological station	212	Municipal	São José do Vale do Rio Preto	
Paraíso	Ecological station	4,920	State	Guapimirim, Cachoeiras de Macacu	1987
Pedra das Flores	Natural monument	346	Municipal	São José do Vale do Rio Preto	2005
Pedra do Elefante	Natural monument	530	Municipal	Petrópolis	2010
Petrópolis	Environmental protection area	59,618	Federal	Petrópolis, Magé, Duque de Caxias, Guapimirim	1992
Petrópolis	Municipal nature park	17	Municipal	Petrópolis	2002
Querência	Private natural heritage reserve	5	Federal	Magé	1999
Jaceruba	Environmental protection area	247	Municipal	Nova Iguaçu	2002
Serra do Barbosão	Municipal nature park	878	Municipal	Tanguá	2007
Serra dos Órgãos	National park	20,024	Federal	Petrópolis, Guapimirim, Magé, Teresópolis, São Gonçalo	1939
Suruí	Environmental protection area	14,146	Municipal	Magé	2007
Taquara	Municipal nature park	19	Municipal	Duque de Caxias	1992
Tinguá	Biological reserve	26,136	Federal	Miguel Pereira, Petrópolis, Nova Iguaçu, Duque de Caxias	1989
Três Picos	State park	58,800	State	Cachoeiras de Macacu, Teresópolis, Nova Friburgo, Silva Jardim, Guapimirim	2002

== Sources ==
- "Corredor ecológico da Serra do Mar", Acervo da Folha do Meio (in Portuguese), FMA: Folha do Meio Ambiente, 20 December 2006, archived from the original on 23 September 2016
- Costa, Cláudia; Lamas, Ivana; Fernandes, Rosan (December 2010), Planejamento Estratégico do Mosaico Central Fluminense (PDF) (in Portuguese), Reserva da Biosfera da Mata Atlântica, archived from the original (PDF) on 2016-10-07
