= Bom Jardim, Rio de Janeiro =

Bom Jardim
- Municipality
- Município de Bom Jardim
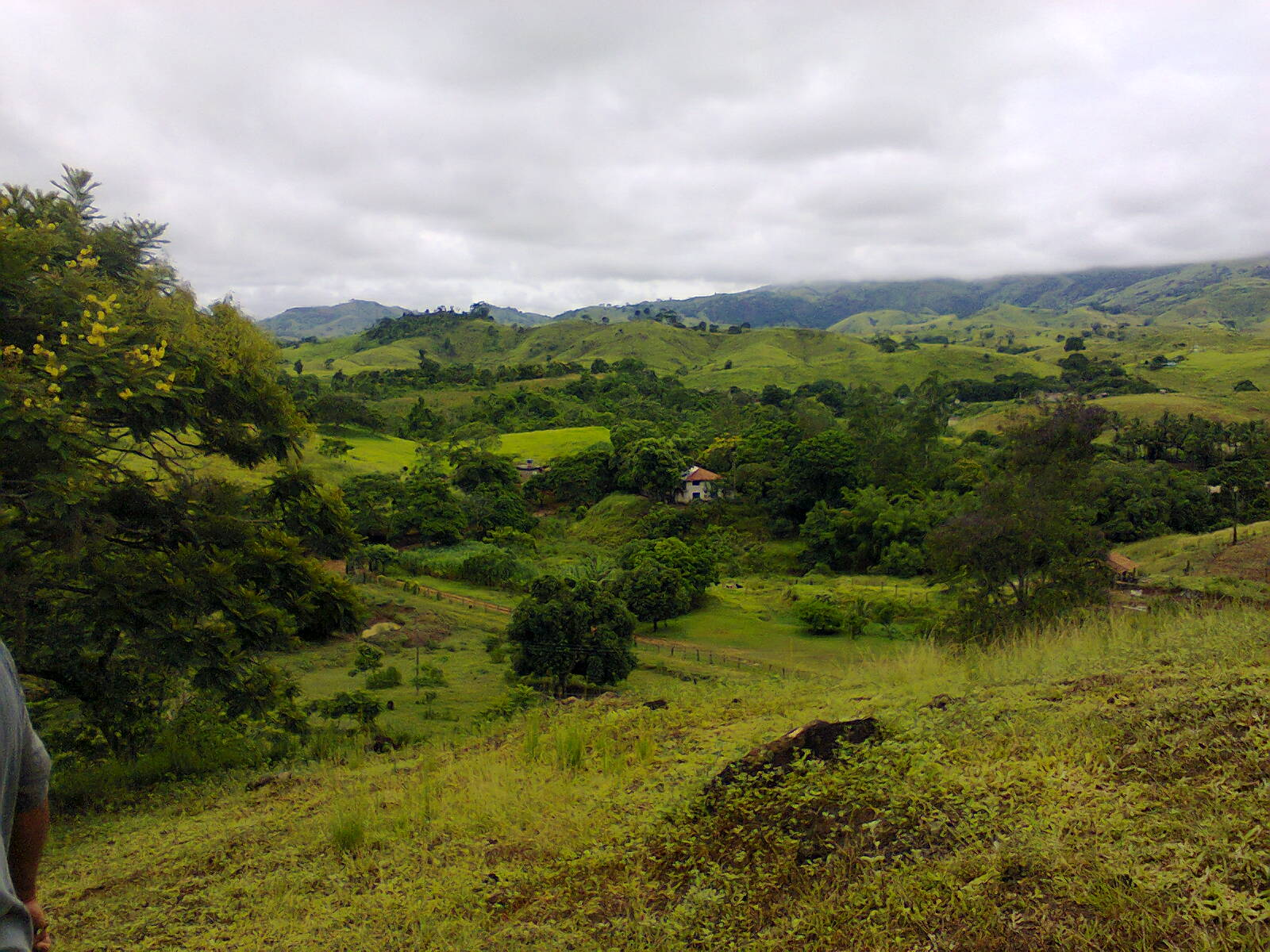
- House in the countryside of the city

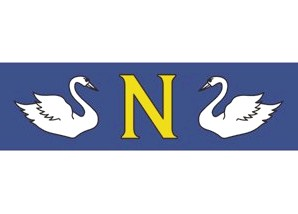
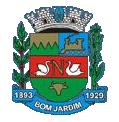
- Flag Coat of arms

- Location of Bom Jardim in the state of Rio de Janeiro

- Location of Bom Jardim in Brazil
- Coordinates: 22°09′07″S 42°25′08″W
- Country: Brazil
- Region: Southeast
- State: Rio de Janeiro

Government
  - Prefeito: Antonio Claret Gonçalves Figueira (PSB)

Area
  - Total: 384.981 km^{2} (148.642 sq mi)
- Elevation: 574 m (1,883 ft)

Population (2020)
  - Total: 27,616
- Time zone: UTC-3 (UTC−3)

Bom Jardim (Portuguese pronunciation: [ˈbõ(w) ʒaʁˈdʒĩ]) is a municipality located in the Brazilian state of Rio de Janeiro. Its population was 27,616 (2020) and its area is 385 km^{2}.

The municipality contains part of the Central Rio de Janeiro Atlantic Forest Mosaic, created in 2006.
