= Renato Cozzolino =

Brazilian politician (born 1991)

- Cozzolino in 2020

Member-elect of the Chamber of Deputies
- Assuming office 1 February 2027
- Constituency: Rio de Janeiro

Mayor of Magé
- In office 1 January 2021 – 4 April 2026
- Vice Mayor: Jamille Cozzolino
- Preceded by: Rafael Tubarão
- Succeeded by: Jamille Cozzolino

Member of the Legislative Assembly of Rio de Janeiro
- In office 1 February 2015 – 1 January 2021
- Constituency: At-large

Personal details
- Born: Renato Cozzolino Harb; 11 February 1991 (age 35) Magé, Rio de Janeiro, Brazil
- Party: PP (2020–present)
- Other political affiliations: PR (2014–2018); PRP (2018–2020)

Renato Cozzolino Harb (born 21 February 1991) is a Brazilian politician serving as mayor of Magé since 2021. From 2015 to 2019, he was a member of the Legislative Assembly of Rio de Janeiro.

Political offices
Preceded by Rafael Tubarão	Mayor of Magé; 2021–2026	Succeeded by Jamille Cozzolino
