= Suruí (Pará) =

Indigenous people of Brazil

Suruí do Pará
Aikewara

Total population
- 383 (2014)

Regions with significant populations
- Brazil
- Pará: 383

Languages
- Suruí do Pará

Religion
- Native American religion

Related ethnic groups
- Asuriní do Tocantins and Parakanã

The Suruí are an Indigenous people of Brazil who live in the state of Pará. They are a different people than the Suruí do Jiparaná.

== Name ==
The Suruí are also known as the Sororós, Aikewara, Akewara, and Akewere people.

== Language ==
The Suruí do Pará language belongs to Subgroup IV of the Tupi-Guarani language family. It is written in the Latin script, and literacy rates in the language are extremely low.

== History ==
First prolonged contact with the modern world came in the late 1960s. The tribe was decimated by disease. In 1960, they experienced an influenza epidemic, followed by a smallpox epidemic in 1962. The Suruí fled their homeland due to attacks by the Xikrin people.

== See also ==
- Indigenous peoples in Brazil
- List of Indigenous peoples in Brazil
