= Guapimirim =

- Municipality
- Município de Guapimirim
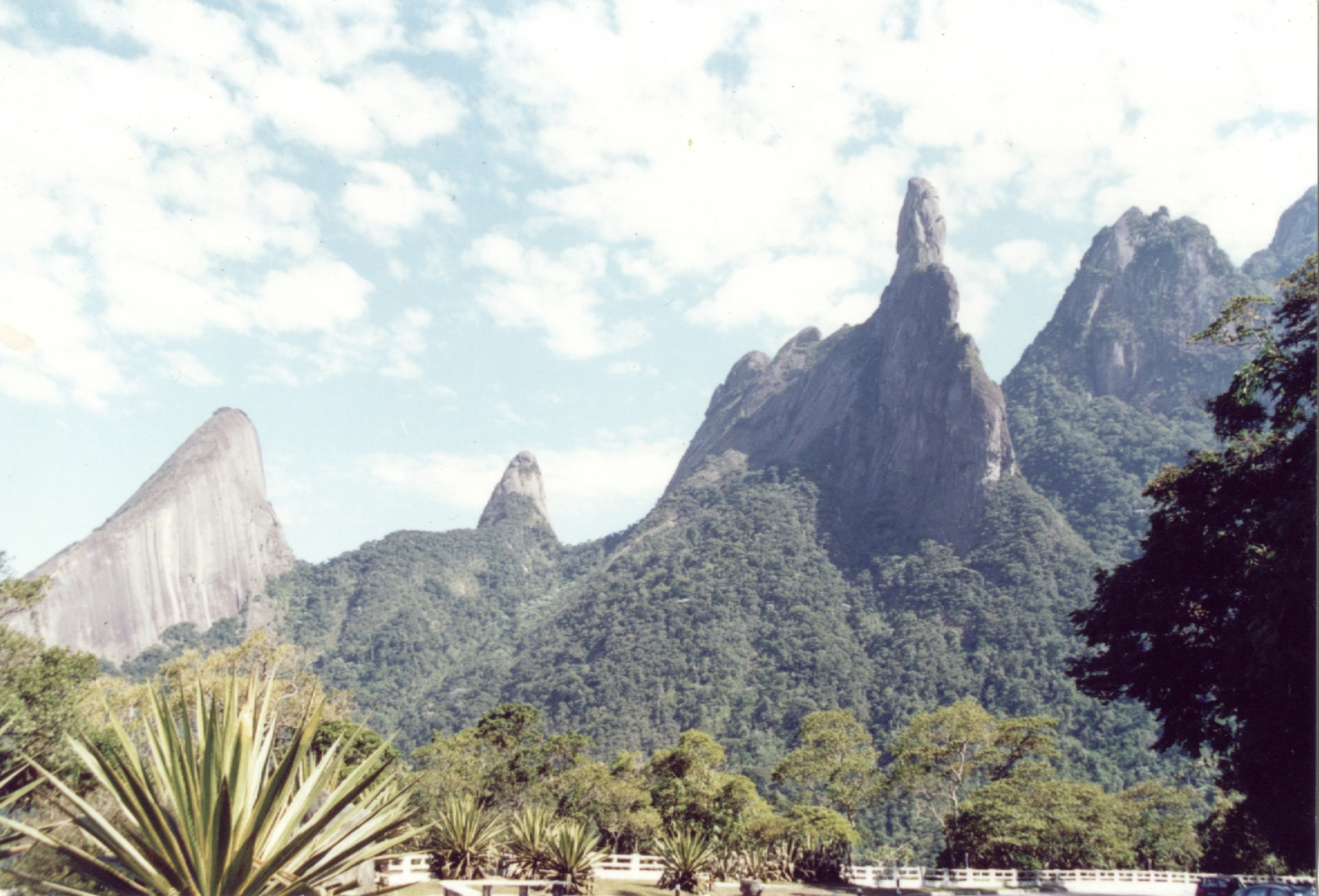
- Dedo de Deus Mountain

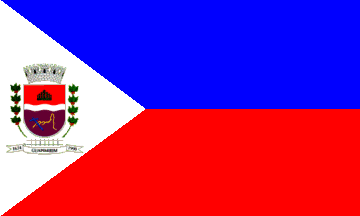
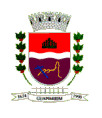
- Flag Coat of arms

- Location of Guapimirim in the state of Rio de Janeiro

- Location of Guapimirim in Brazil
- Coordinates: 22°32′13″S 42°48′55″W
- Country: Brazil
- Region: Southeast
- State: Rio de Janeiro

Government
  - Prefeito: Zelito Tringuelê (PDT)

Area
  - Total: 356.566 km^{2} (137.671 sq mi)
- Elevation: 48 m (157 ft)

Population (2020)
  - Total: 61,388
- Time zone: UTC−3 (BRT)

Guapimirim (Portuguese pronunciation: [ɡwɐpimiˈɾĩ], from Tupi 'little spring', guapi 'spring', mirim 'little') is a municipality in the Brazilian state of Rio de Janeiro around 50 km (31 miles) from its state capital, the city of Rio de Janeiro. Its in a region known as Baixada Fluminense and the Greater Rio de Janeiro metropolitan area.

The municipality is in the Serra dos Órgãos mountain range where its most famous tourist attraction, the Dedo de Deus, is located. 70% of its area is under environmental protection, most notably the Serra dos Órgãos National Park.

== Geography ==
The population of Guapimirim was 61,388 in 2020, and its area is 361 square kilometres (139 sq mi).

== Conservation ==
The municipality contains part of the Central Rio de Janeiro Atlantic Forest Mosaic, created in 2006. It held 24% of the 4,920-hectare (12,200-acre) Paraíso Ecological Station, created in 1987 and now integrated into the Três Picos State Park. It contains 4% of the 46,350-hectare (114,500-acre) Três Picos State Park, created in 2002. It contains part of the 19,508-hectare (48,210-acre) Bacia do Rio Macacu Environmental Protection Area, created in 2002. The municipality contains the 15,582-hectare (38,500-acre) Guapi-Guapiaçú Environmental Protection Area, created in 2004. It contains 42% of the 1,936-hectare (4,780-acre) Guanabara Ecological Station, created in 2006.
