= Suruí do Pará language =

Dialect of the Tupian Akwáwa language of Brazil

Suruí do Pará
- Native to: Brazil
- Region: Pará
- Ethnicity: Suruí
- Native speakers: 260 (2006)
- Language family: Tupian: Tupí–Guaraní; Guaraní (IV); Akwáwa; Suruí do Pará

Language codes
- ISO 639-3: mdz
- Glottolog: suru1261
- ELP: Suruí do Pará
- Linguasphere: 88-AAB-bc

The Suruí do Pará dialect of the Tupian Akwáwa language of Brazil is spoken in the Araguaia region in the state Pará and in the town of São João do Araguaia. It is written in the Latin script, but literacy in Suruí do Pará is extremely low.

Suruí do Pará is regarded as a dialect of Akwáwa by linguists such as Aryon Dall'Igna Rodrigues. The other two dialects of Akwáwa are Parakanã and Asuriní of Tocantins.

== Names ==
It is also known as Aikewara, Akewara, Akewere, and Suruí.

== Phonology ==
Suruí has five vowels: /a, e, i, ɨ , o/. All vowels have nasalized forms, and Suruí has contrastive nasalisation.

Consonants
		Bilabial	Alveolar	Postalveolar	Palatal	Velar	Glottal
Stop	voiceless	p	t			k	ʔ
Stop	voiced	b	d			g	
Affricate	voiceless			t͡ʃ			
Affricate	voiced			d͡ʒ			
Fricative			s	ʃ			
Nasal		m	n		ɲ	ŋ	
Approximant			l		j	w	
Flap			ɾ				
