= Silva Jardim =

- Municipality
- Município de Silva Jardim
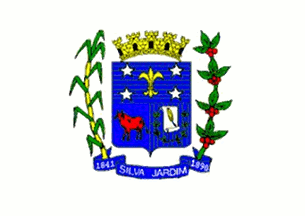
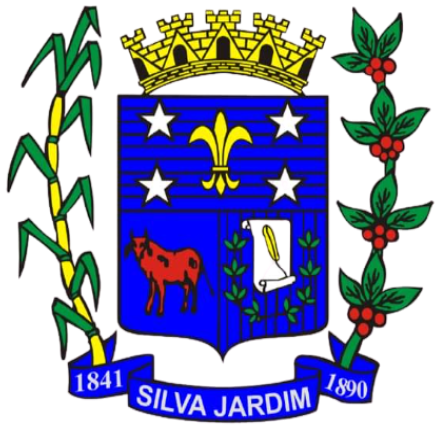
- Flag Coat of arms

- Location of Silva Jardim in the state of Rio de Janeiro

- Location of Silva Jardim in Brazil
- Coordinates: 22°39′03″S 42°23′31″W
- Country: Brazil
- Region: Southeast
- State: Rio de Janeiro

Government
  - Prefeito: Maira FIgueiredo (PMDB)

Area
  - Total: 937.755 km^{2} (362.069 sq mi)
- Elevation: 35 m (115 ft)

Population (2022)
  - Total: 21,352
  - Density: 22.769/km^{2} (58.972/sq mi)
- Time zone: UTC−3 (BRT)

Silva Jardim (Portuguese pronunciation: [ˈsiwvɐ ʒaʁˈdʒĩ]) is a municipality located in the Brazilian state of Rio de Janeiro. Its population was 21,352 (2022) and its area is 937 km^{2} (362 sq mi).

== Conservation ==
The municipality contains the 5,052-hectare (12,480-acre) Poço das Antas Biological Reserve, a strictly protected conservation unit created in 1974 from a former experimental agricultural station. It contains 7.5% of the 46,350-hectare (114,500-acre) Três Picos State Park, created in 2002. It contains part of the Central Rio de Janeiro Atlantic Forest Mosaic of conservation units, created in 2006.

== See also ==
- Antônio da Silva Jardim
