= Magé =

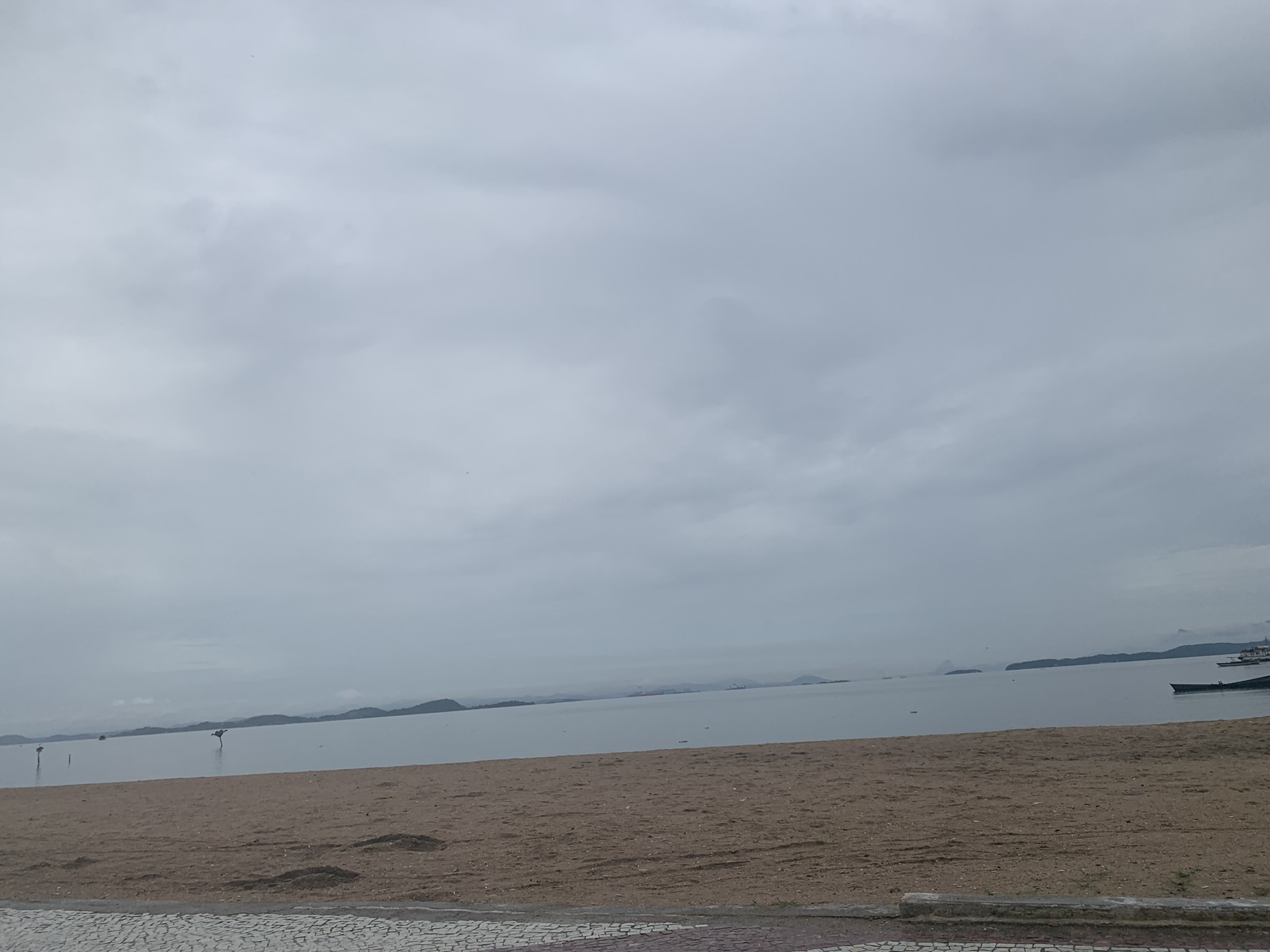
- Mauá's beach

- Flag Coat of arms

- Location in Rio de Janeiro and Brazil

- Location within Brazil
- Coordinates: 22°39′10″S 43°02′27″W
- Country: Brazil
- Region: Southeast
- State: Rio de Janeiro
- Founded: 1566

Government
  - Mayor: Renato Cozzolino

Area
  - Total: 385.7 km^{2} (148.9 sq mi)
- Elevation: 5 m (16 ft)

Population (2022 Brazilian census)
  - Total: 228,127
  - Estimate (2025): 244,142
  - Density: 591.5/km^{2} (1,532/sq mi)
- Time zone: UTC−3 (BRT)
- Website: Municipality official's website

Magé (Portuguese pronunciation: [maˈʒɛ]) is a municipality located in the Brazilian state of Rio de Janeiro.

Magepe-Mirim (pronounced [maˈʒɛpi miˈɾĩ]) was established in 1566 by Portuguese colonists. It is considered to be a calm place, especially compared to nearby Rio.

== Politics ==
In the 5 October 2008 municipal elections, Núbia Cozzolino was re-elected mayor with 51% of the vote but had her mandate revoked in 2009 after being impeached on various corruption charges. She was succeeded by her deputy Rozan Gomes who was also impeached resulting in a by-election. On 31 July 2011, Nestor Vidal of PMDB won with 68.62% of the vote.

== Geography ==
Magé borders Petrópolis to the north, Duque de Caxias to west, Guapimirim to the east and Guanabara Bay to the south.

The climate is tropical throughout the municipality, except in areas near the Serra dos Órgãos with a subtropical highland climate.

The municipality contains part of the Central Rio de Janeiro Atlantic Forest Mosaic, created in 2006. It also contains the 14,146-hectare (34,960-acre) Suruí Environmental Protection Area.

== Demographics ==
Populational Growth of Magé
Ano	População
1960	86 981
1975	107 422
1990	183 204
2000	219 007
2010	227 322
2020	246 433
2025	244 142

According to then-mayor Nestor Vidal, the high index of growth in population is caused by low taxes and low prices of homes in the city. As of 2020, the population is 246,433, up from the approx. 90,000 in the 1960s. According to the 2009 census, whites constituted 15.2% of the demographic makeup, browns (mulatos) were 66.6%, and blacks were 19.1%. Other races represented 0.01% of the population in Magé. Class A population was 1.5%, Class B 46.2%, Class C 47.1% and Class D 6.2%. This indicates the index of poverty is high in the city; more than 55% are living in the poverty line in Magé.

== Infrastructure ==
=== Transport ===
The city has federal and state access: RJ-107, BR-116 and BR-493. There is no airport.

According to the IBGE, in 2022, Magé had a fleet of 84,655 vehicles, with cars being the most common.

== Notable people ==
The Brazilian Internationally well known soccer player Mané Garrincha was born in Magé (Pau Grande) on 28 October 1933.

== Sources ==
- Costa, Cláudia; Lamas, Ivana; Fernandes, Rosan (December 2010), Planejamento Estratégico do Mosaico Central Fluminense (PDF) (in Portuguese), Reserva da Biosfera da Mata Atlântica, archived from the original (PDF) on 7 October 2016
- Herrera, Breno (2012), Mosaico da Mata Atlântica Central Fluminense: Experiência do Planejamento Estratégico (PDF) (in Portuguese), ICMBio: Instituto Chico Mendes
