= Rio Bonito, Rio de Janeiro =

Rio Bonito
- Municipality
- Município de Rio Bonito
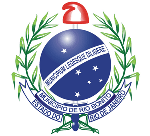
- Flag Coat of arms
- Motto: Mvnicipivm Legesqve Diligere
- Location of Rio Bonito in the state of Rio de Janeiro

- Location of Rio Bonito in Brazil
- Coordinates: 22°42′28″S 42°37′33″W
- Country: Brazil
- Region: Southeast
- State: Rio de Janeiro

Government
  - Prefeito: José Luis Alves Antunes (PP)

Area
  - Total: 462.156 km^{2} (178.439 sq mi)
- Elevation: 40 m (130 ft)

Population (2020)
  - Total: 60,573
- Time zone: UTC−3 (BRT)

Rio Bonito (Portuguese pronunciation: [ˈʁi.u buˈnitu], [ˈʁi.u boˈnitu]) is a municipality located in the Brazilian state of Rio de Janeiro. Its population was 60,573 (2020) and its area is 462 km^{2}.

The municipality contains part of the Central Rio de Janeiro Atlantic Forest Mosaic of conservation units, created in 2006.

== Climate ==
Climate data for Rio Bonito (1981–2010)
Month	Jan	Feb	Mar	Apr	May	Jun	Jul	Aug	Sep	Oct	Nov	Dec	Year
Mean daily maximum °C (°F)	32.5 (90.5)	33.5 (92.3)	32.3 (90.1)	30.3 (86.5)	27.8 (82.0)	27.4 (81.3)	26.8 (80.2)	28.0 (82.4)	28.1 (82.6)	29.0 (84.2)	29.8 (85.6)	31.3 (88.3)	29.7 (85.5)
Mean daily minimum °C (°F)	22.5 (72.5)	22.3 (72.1)	21.9 (71.4)	20.3 (68.5)	17.3 (63.1)	15.5 (59.9)	15.3 (59.5)	16.2 (61.2)	17.7 (63.9)	19.6 (67.3)	20.4 (68.7)	21.7 (71.1)	19.2 (66.6)
Average precipitation mm (inches)	205.6 (8.09)	164.0 (6.46)	194.4 (7.65)	123.0 (4.84)	82.7 (3.26)	40.9 (1.61)	68.4 (2.69)	55.1 (2.17)	89.2 (3.51)	113.6 (4.47)	225.4 (8.87)	210.3 (8.28)	1,572.6 (61.91)
Average precipitation days (≥ 1.0 mm)	13	9	11	9	8	5	8	6	9	11	13	12	114
Source: Instituto Nacional de Meteorologia

== Site ==
GuiaRB - The Rio Bonito Site
