= Serra dos Órgãos =

Mountain range in the state of Rio de Janeiro, Brazil

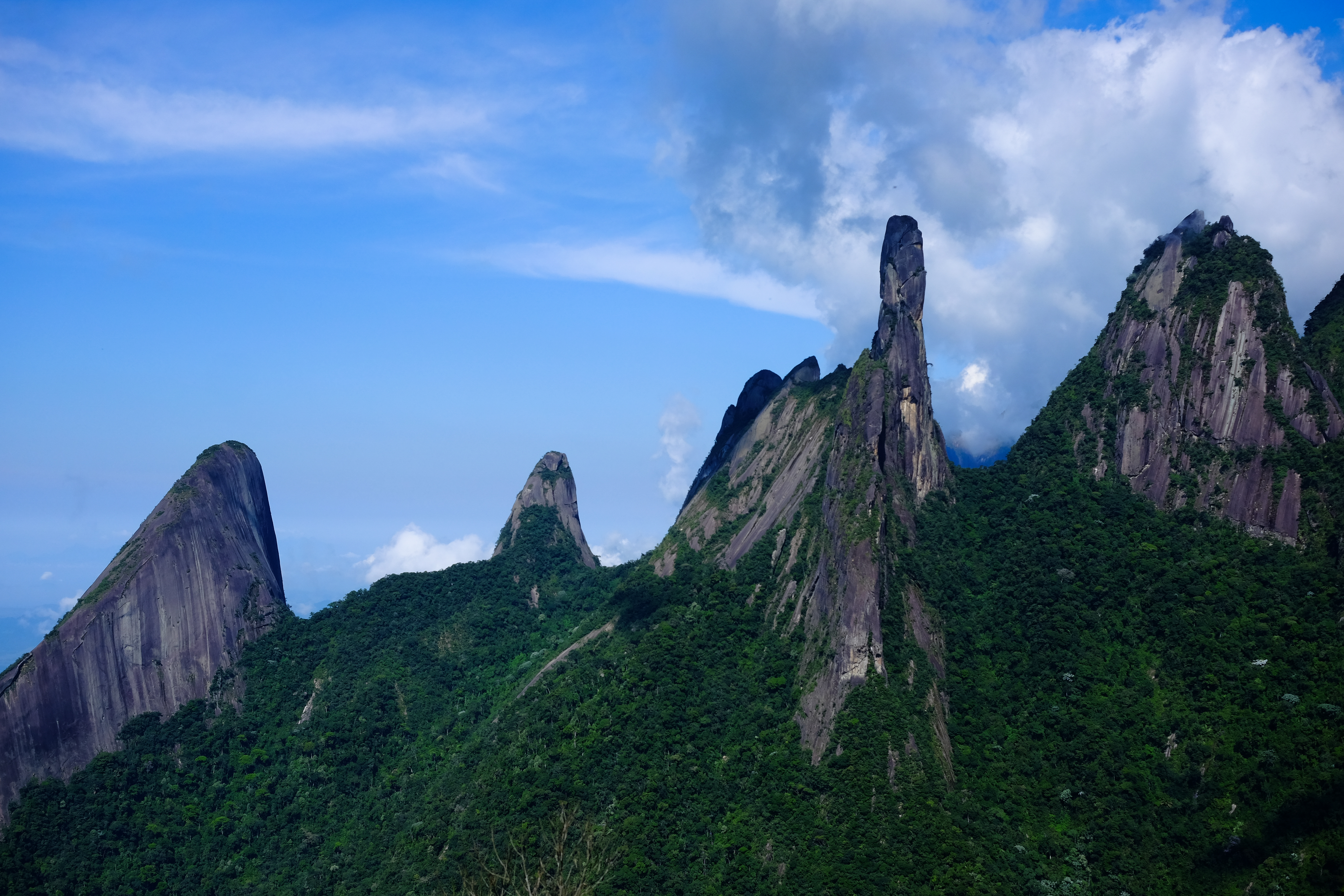
- Finger of God from Teresópolis

Highest point
- Coordinates: 22°27′49″S 43°01′50″W

Geography
- Location within Brazil

The Serra dos Órgãos ("Organ Range") is a mountain range in the state of Rio de Janeiro, Brazil. It contains the Serra dos Órgãos National Park.

== Location ==
The Serra dos Órgãos is the name of the region of the Serra do Mar in the central part of the state of Rio de Janeiro. It covers an area of 20,024 hectares (49,480 acres). The range is an escarpment on the northern edge of the Guanabara Graben between the cities of Petrópolis and Teresópolis. The name comes from perceived resemblance of the vertical rock formations created by erosion to the tubes of organs used in Portuguese churches at the time.

== Topography ==
Along the escarpment the altitude ranges from near sea level in the coastal plain to 2,260 metres (7,410 ft) above sea level 4 kilometres (2.5 mi) further inland. The average elevation is 1,100 metres (3,600 ft) above sea level. The Dedo de Deus (God's Finger) and Escalavrado, at 1,692 metres (5,551 ft) and 1,490 metres (4,890 ft) and the nearby peaks with steep rock walls are dramatic features that can be seen on a clear day from Rio de Janeiro, which is 50 kilometres (31 mi) distant. The highest point is Pedra do Sino (Bell Rock) at 2,263 metres (7,425 ft).

A north west fracture is exposed at the plateau's rock surfaces, which defines the direction of the ridges and valleys along the escarpment. One of these ridges contains several granite peaks including God's Finger. North east vertical fractures, spaced regularly about every 500 metres (1,600 ft), cut the north west structures at right angles. Erosion along these fractures has isolated the massive rock blocks. The valleys have well-preserved deposits of debris that has fallen from the rock walls. In November 1981 a period of intense rain triggered hundreds of shallow landslides and flows of debris that blocked the BR-116 highway and killed about 20 people.

== Geology ==
The mountains consist of granitic gneisses of the Neoproterozoic era. The region is structurally complex with considerable faulting combined with erosion. The ridge containing the God's Finger and other towers is unusual in being sustained by a thick dike of Cambrian granite that is more resistant to erosion than the surrounding Neoproterozoic orthogneisses. Formation of the rocks may have occurred around 620 million years ago.

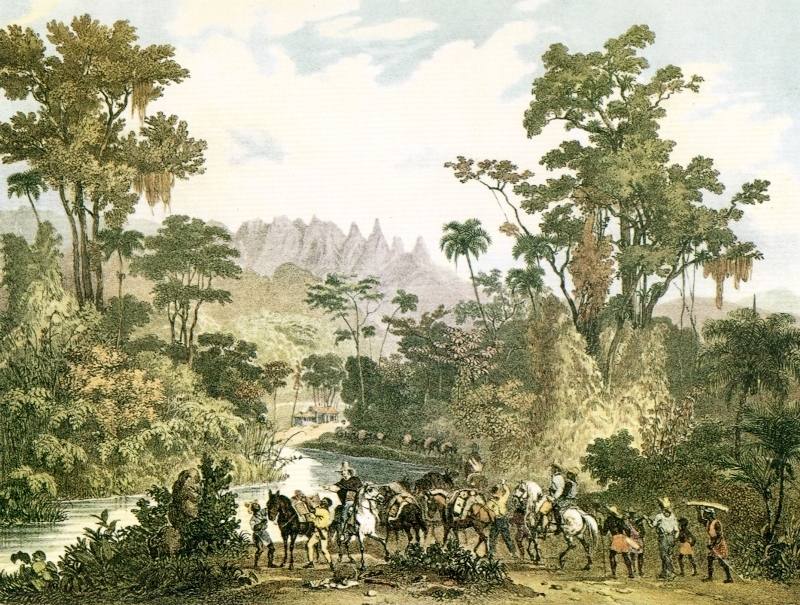
Serra dos Orgãos during the 1820s. Painting by Johann Moritz Rugendas

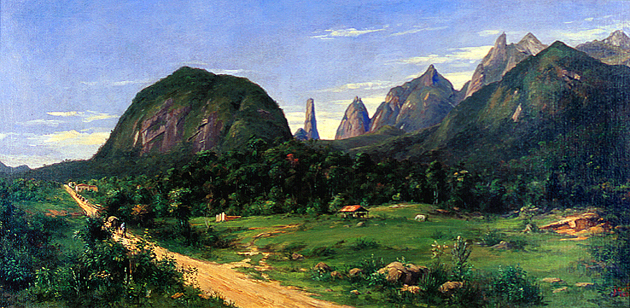
Serra dos Órgãos as seen from Teresópolis, 1885. Oil on canvas by Georg Grimm

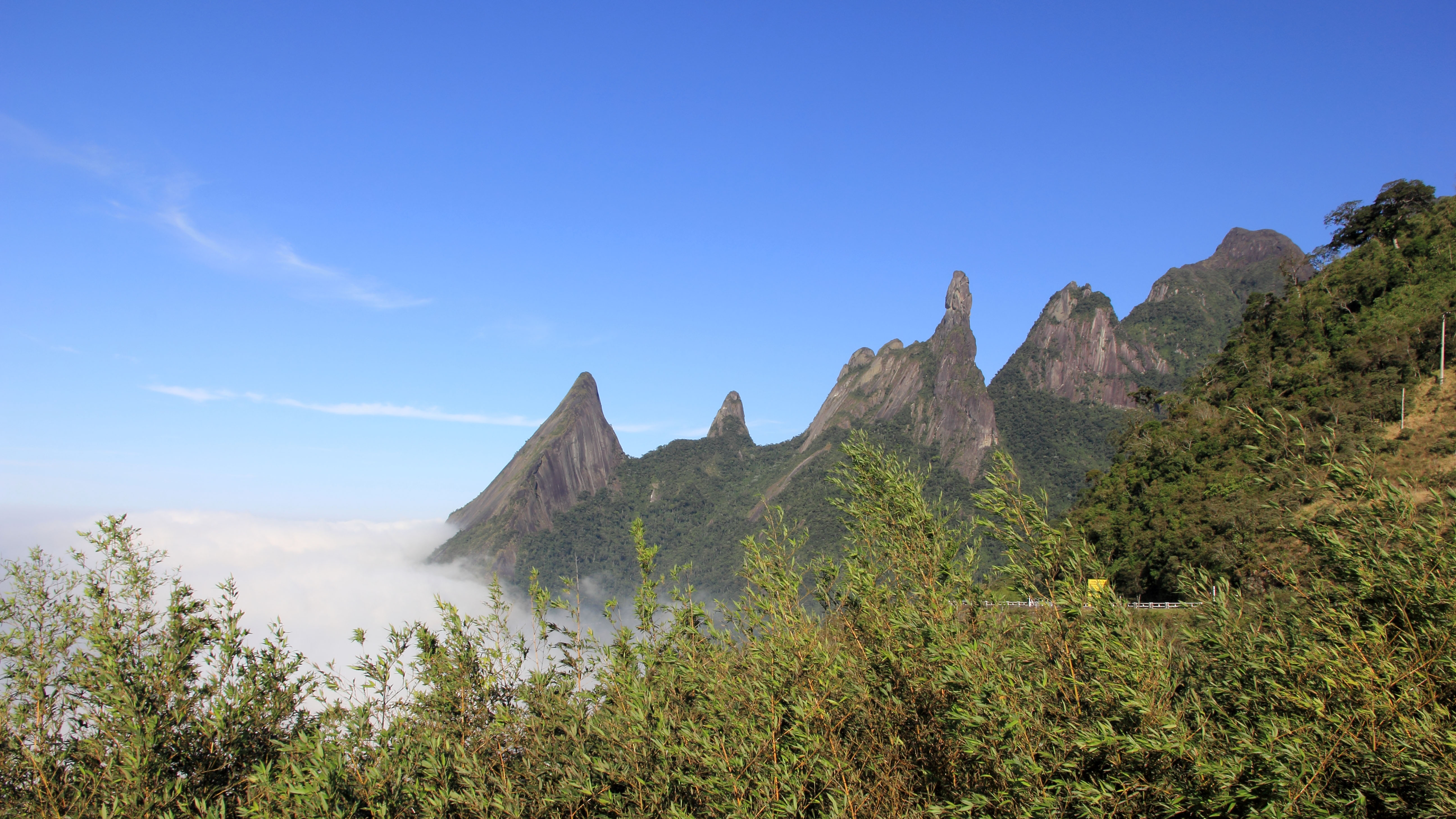
Peaks (from left to right): Escalavrado, Dedo de Nossa Senhora, Dedo de Deus, Cabeça de Peixe and Santo Antônio.

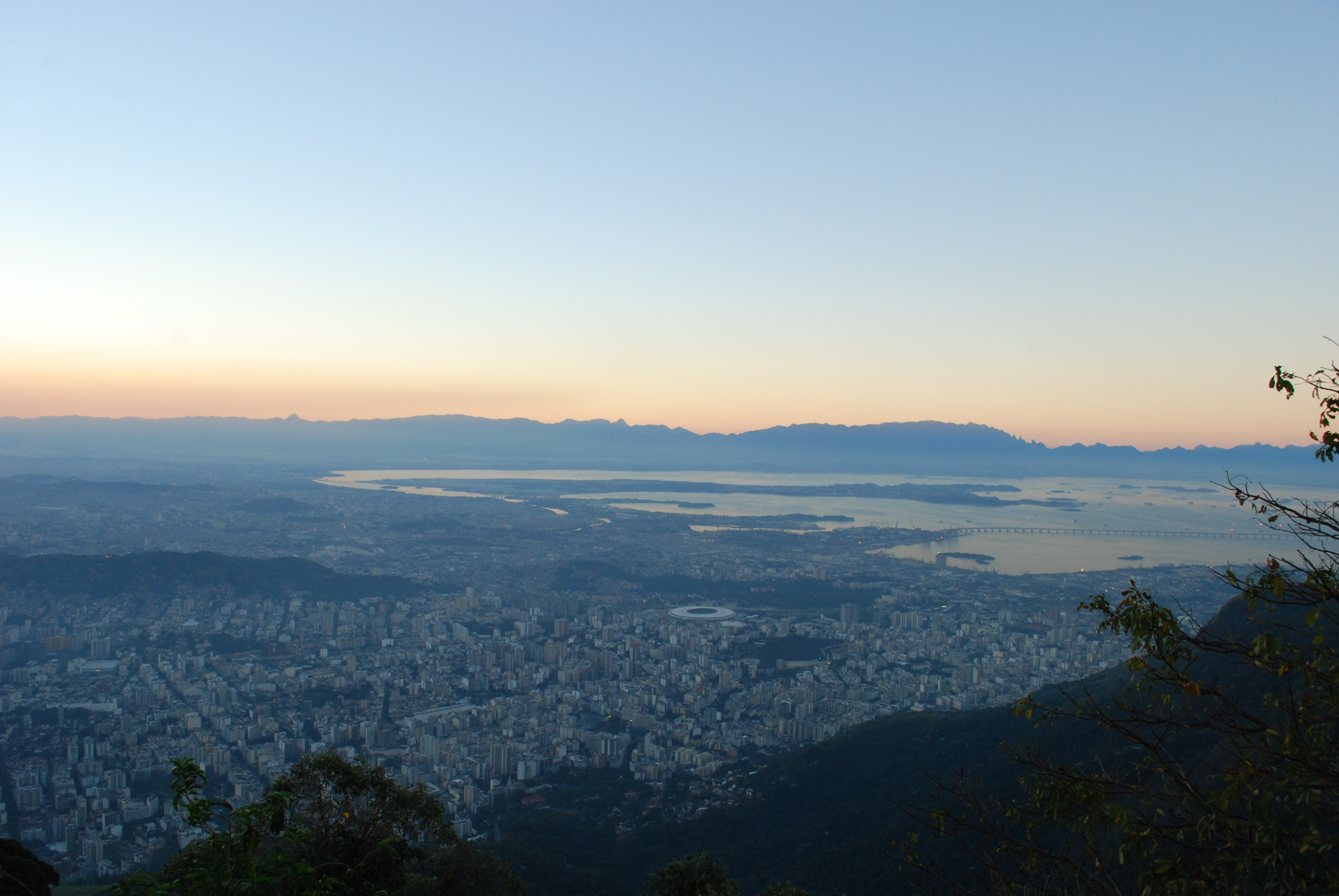
Serra dos Órgãos, in the background, as seen from the city of Rio de Janeiro

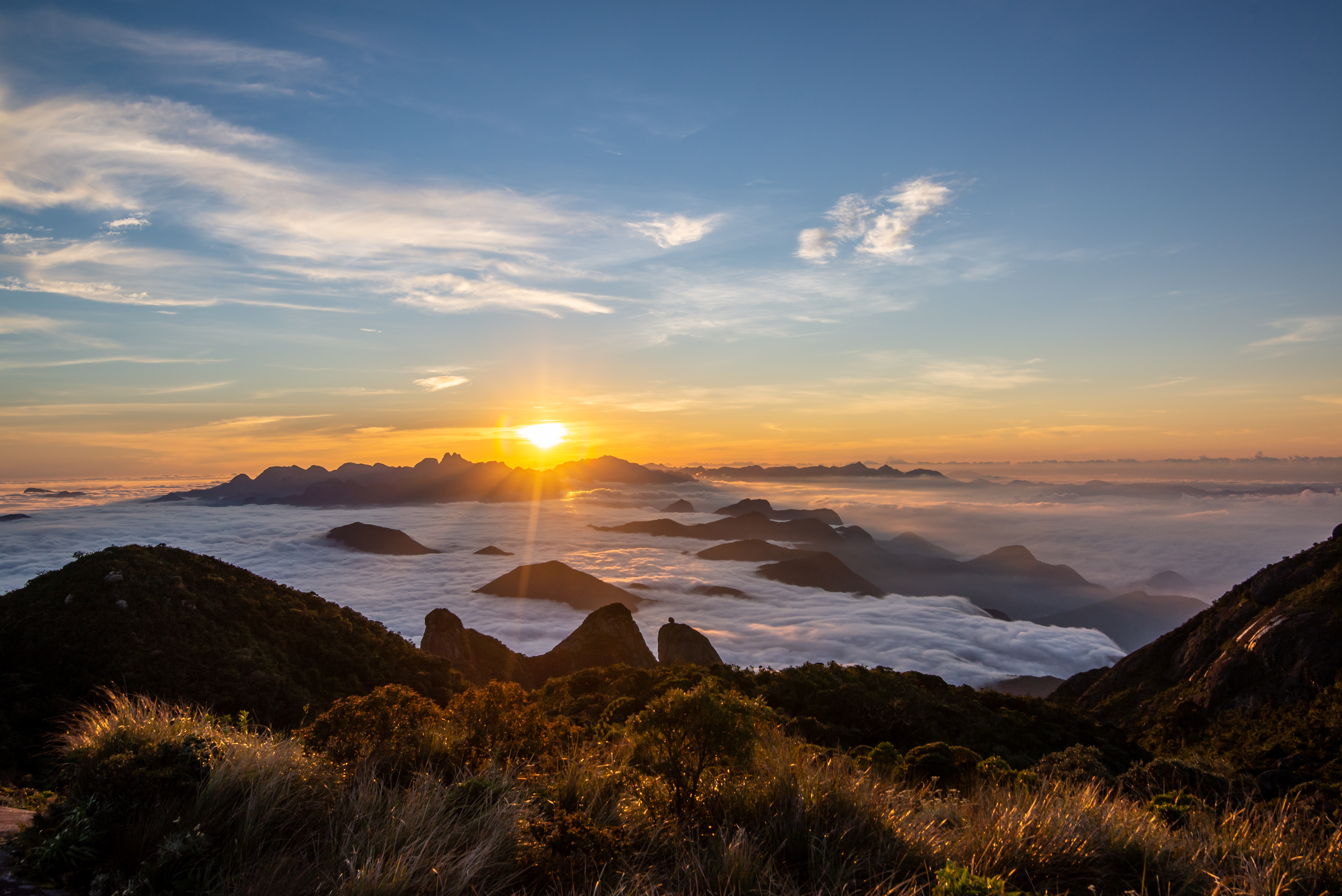
Sunrise

== See also ==
- Pedra da Gávea
- Sugarloaf Mountain and Urca Hill Natural Monument

== Sources ==
- Geologia (in Portuguese), Chico Mendes Institute for Biodiversity Conservation, archived from the original on 2016-08-19
- Migon, Piotr (2010-01-22), Geomorphological Landscapes of the World, Springer Science & Business Media, ISBN 978-90-481-3055-9
- Vieira, Bianca Carvalho; Salgado, André; Santos, Leonardo (2015-03-05), Landscapes and Landforms of Brazil, Springer, ISBN 978-94-017-8023-0
