= District of Teresópolis =

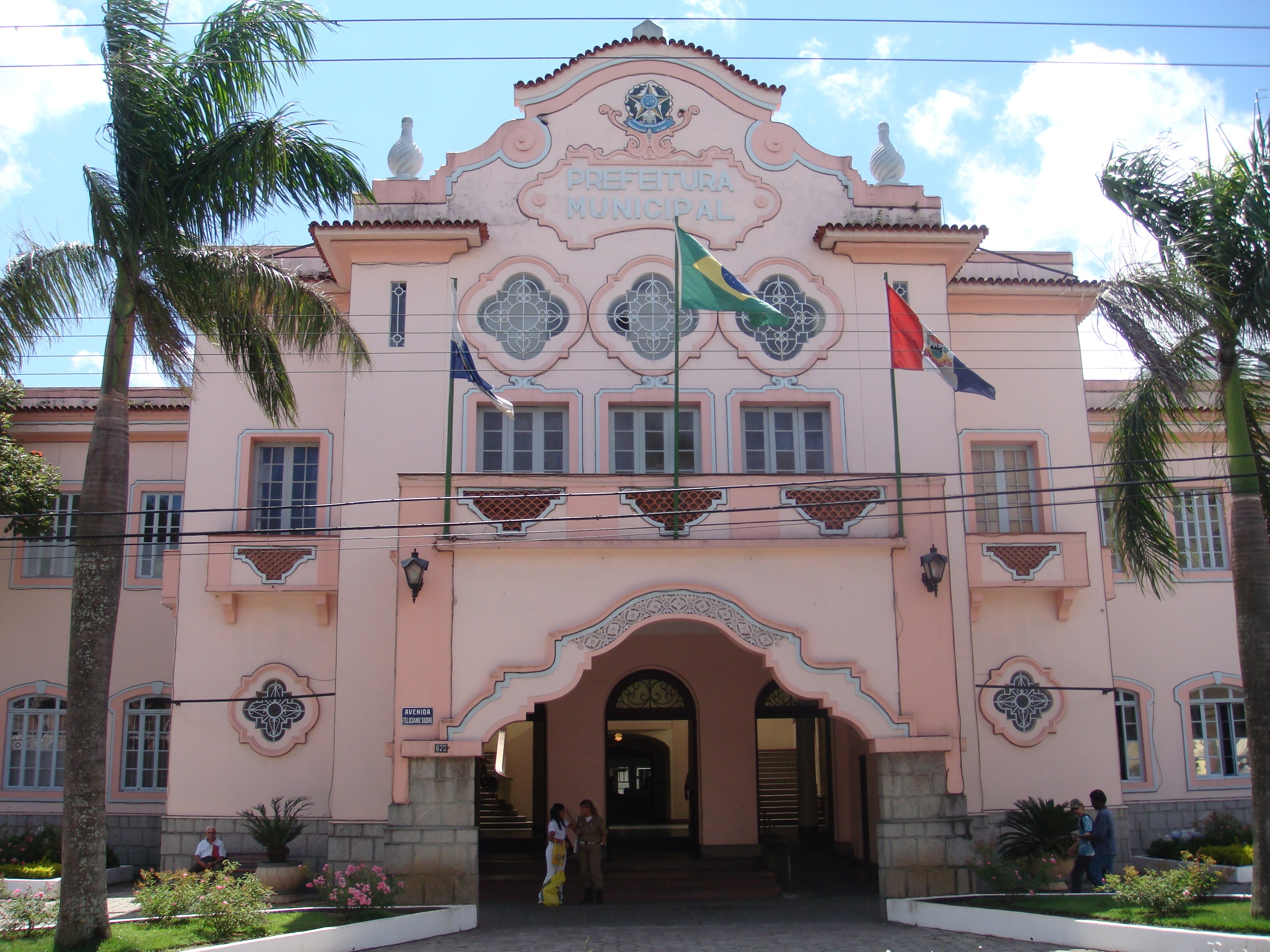
Municipality of Teresópolis, Brazil

District of Teresópolis is a district of the city of Teresópolis. The district is composed of 46 neighborhoods. Its total population is 146,207 inhabitants.

Neighborhoods	Population
Alto	5.500
Agriões	2.000
Artistas	1.990
Araras	920
Barroso	1.650
Bom Retiro	1.500
Beco dos Artistas	500
Caxangá	1.500
Corta Vento	1.000
Cascata dos Amores	1.750
Carlos Guingle	1.574
Caleme	1.698
Ermitage	2.658
Fischer	1.789
Fonte Santa	1.000
Fazendinha	2.000
Granja Guarany	2.000 a 2.500
Granja Comary	1.000
Bairro do Golfe	2.000
Iúcas	1.000
Imbuí	1.500
Jardin Meudon	1.000
Jardim Cascata	1.650
Jardim Europa	985
Jardim Salaco	789
Meudon	2.000
Morro dos Pinheiros	2.147
Morro do Tiro	1.000
Nossa Senhora de Fátima	1.002
Prata	4.000
Parque São Luiz	1.147
Painera	980
Perpétuo	1.654
Pimenteiras	900
Quinta Lebrão	1.000
Quinta da Barra	3.500
Quebra Frascos	1.009
Rosário	2.000
Salaco	500 a 1.000
São Pedro	4.500
Santa Cecília	1.000
Soberbo	500
Tijuca	3.000
Taumaturgo	1.500
Várzea	3.000
Vale Paraíso	1.569
Vila Muqui	1.000
Vargem Grande	985
