= Caleme =

Neighborhood in Rio de Janeiro state, Brazil

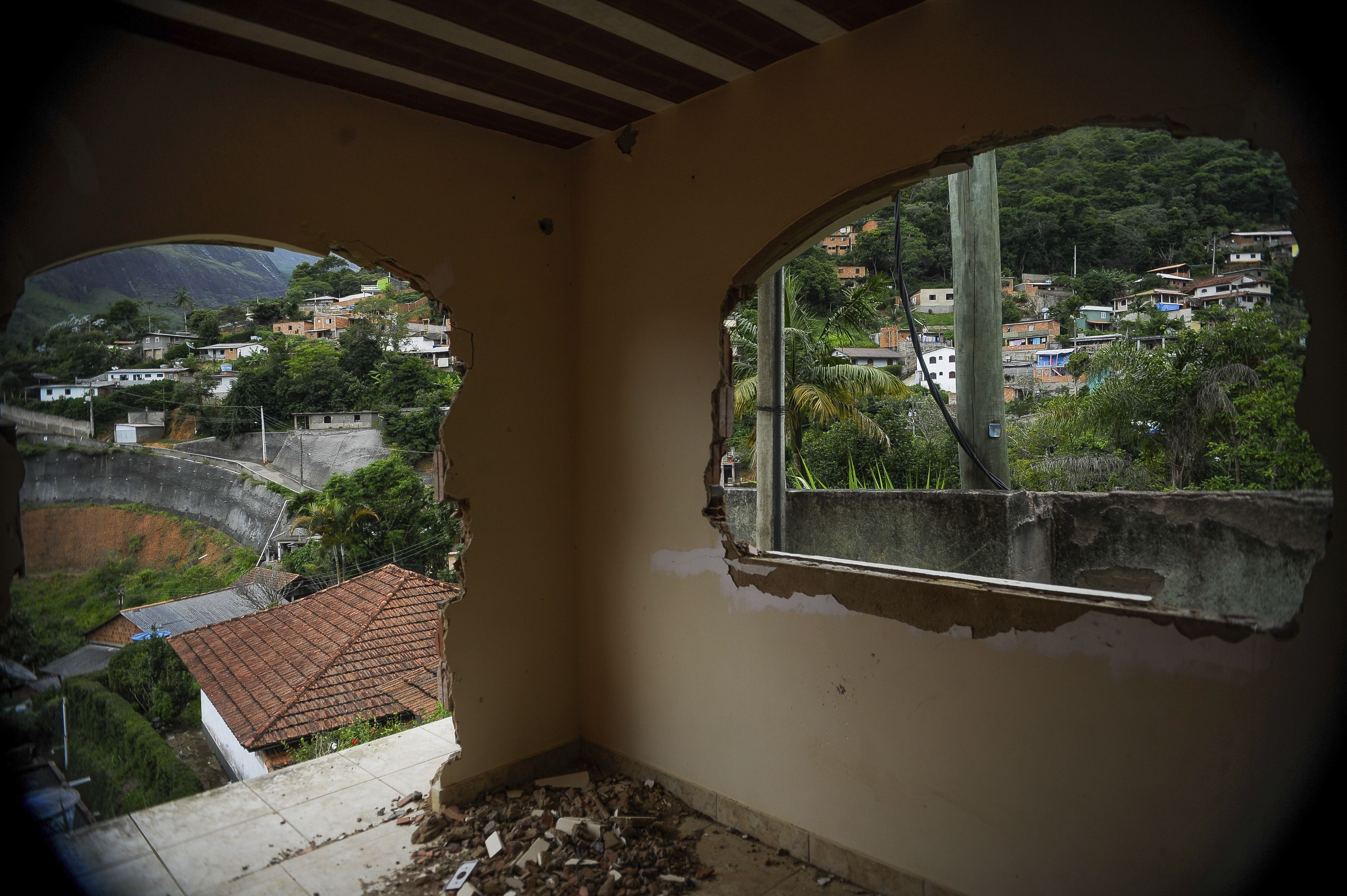
Teresópolis - Destroyed and abandoned houses in the Caleme neighborhood, hit by heavy rains in 2011

Caleme is a neighborhood located in Teresópolis, Rio de Janeiro state, Brazil.

Due to the January 2011 floods and mudslides, the neighborhood was devastated, and became almost ghost place.
