= Teresópolis Futebol Clube =

Teresópolis
- Full name: Teresópolis Futebol Clube
- Nickname(s): Terê
- Founded: August 4, 1915
- Ground: Estádio Antônio Savattone, Teresópolis, Rio de Janeiro state, Brazil
- Capacity: 8,000
Home colors	Away colors

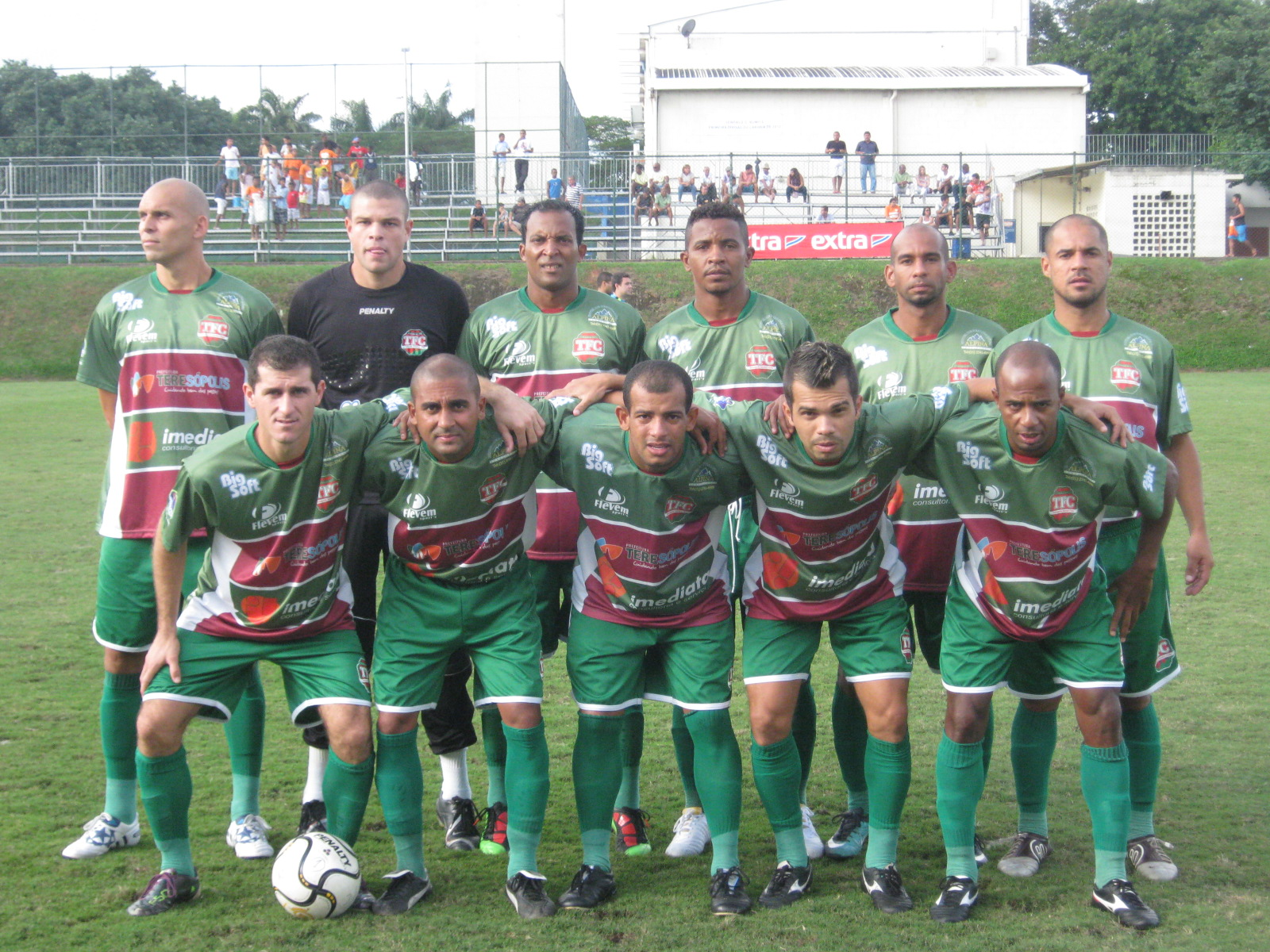
Team photo from the 2011 season

Teresópolis Futebol Clube, commonly known as Teresópolis, is a Brazilian football club based in Teresópolis, Rio de Janeiro state.

== History ==
The club was founded on August 4, 1915, in Alto neighborhood. Teresópolis professionalized its football department in 1989.

== Stadium ==
Teresópolis Futebol Clube play their home games at Estádio Antônio Savattone. The stadium has a maximum capacity of 8,000 people.
