= Francisco Portela =

Brazilian politician and physician

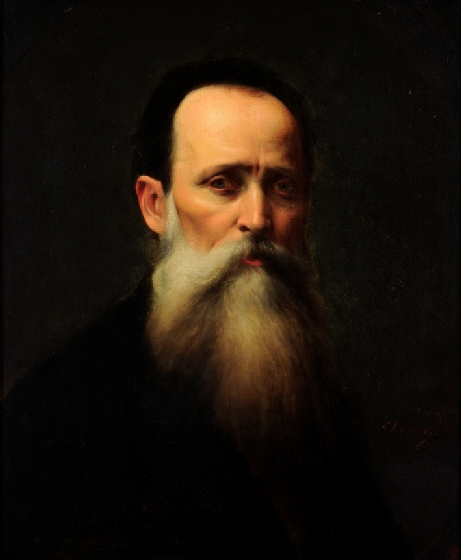
- Portrait of Francisco Portela, by Décio Villares

Governor of Rio de Janeiro
- In office November 16, 1889 – December 10, 1891
- Preceded by: Francisco Silva
- Succeeded by: José Marques Guimarães

Personal details
- Born: 22 June 1833 Oeiras, Empire of Brazil
- Died: 22 December 1913 (aged 80) Rio de Janeiro, Brazil
- Profession: Physician, politician

Francisco Portela (22 July 1833 – 22 December 1913) was a Brazilian physician and politician.

He graduated in medicine from the Faculdade da Corte (College of the Court) and was elected alderman in Campos dos Goytacazes, where he had established his residence.

Was a deputy in the provincial Legislature and appointed President (Governor) of the State of Rio de Janeiro by decree of President Deodoro da Fonseca, in November 1889. Was also elected as the first constitutional president of the State on May 11, 1891.

After the dissolution of the National Congress on November 3, 1891, Portela resigned from government in December 10. It was also a deputy in 1909 and, later, senator.

His name is honored at Governor Portela district, located in the municipality of Miguel Pereira and a municipal school in Teresópolis, Escola Municipal Governador Portela (Governor Portela Municipal School).
