= Morro dos Pinheiros =

Coordinates: 22°25′03″S 42°57′48″W

Morro dos Pinheiros is a neighborhood located in Teresópolis, Rio de Janeiro state, Brazil. In 2010 it had 2.114 inhabitants.

The neighborhood is named after the Pine population located in the place. It is located in Teresópolis downtown, and it hosts the only school in the city, named Escola Municipal Governador Portella. Morro dos Pinheiros borders Tijuca and Várzea.

== Sports ==
Pinheiros Futebol Club is the neighborhood's futsal team.
