= Granja Comary =

Brazilian national football headquarters

Granja Comary Football Complex (CBF)
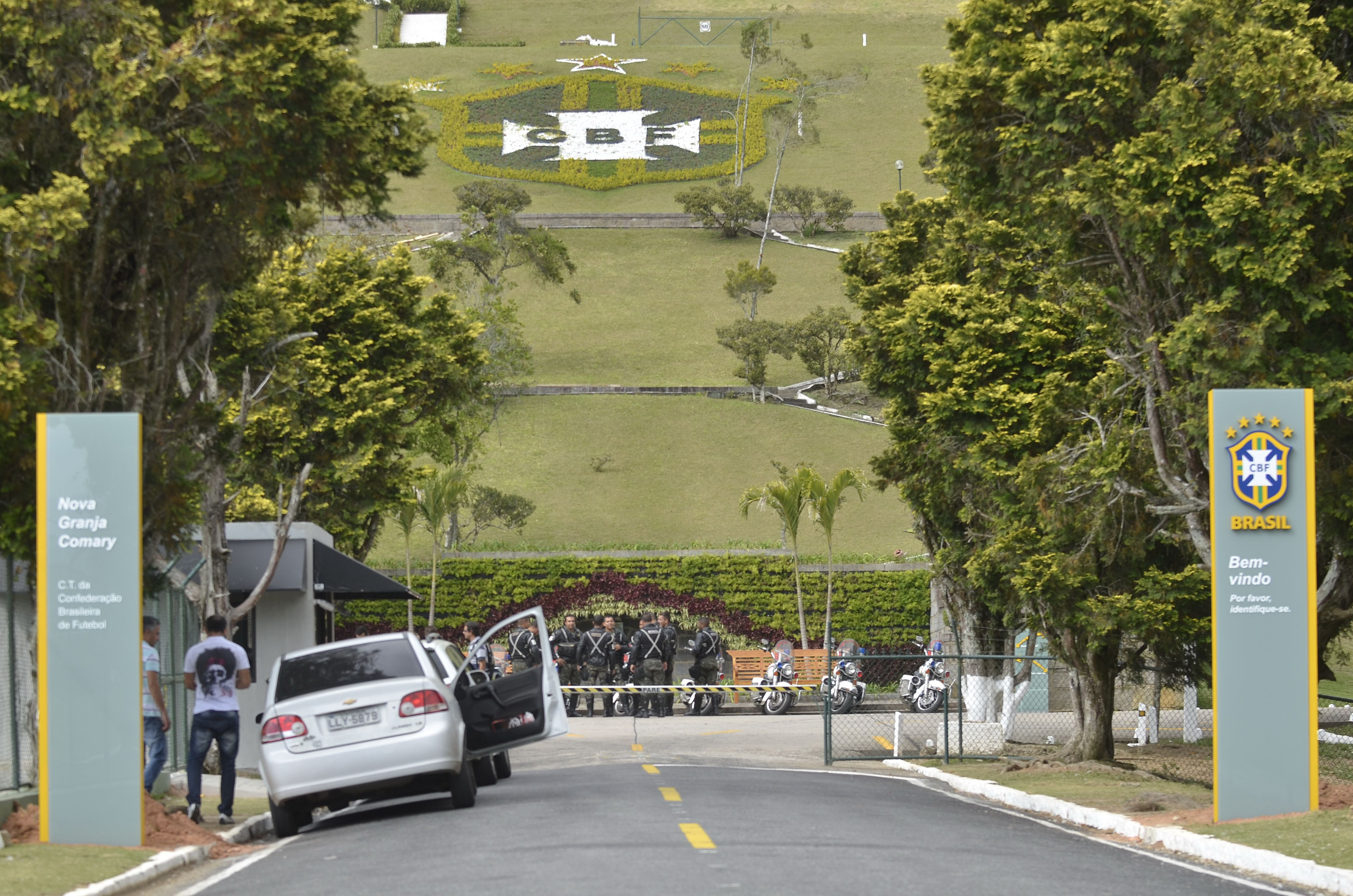
- Entrance to the Granja Comary complex, May 2014

- Location within Brazil
- Address: Teresópolis, Brazil
- Coordinates: 22°26′56″S 42°58′35″W
- Type: Stadium
- Surface: Act Global Artificial Turf. FIFA Certified

Construction
- Opened: 1987

Tenant
- Brazil national football team

Granja Comary football complex is the headquarters and main training center of the Brazil national football team, which is managed by the Brazilian Football Confederation. It is located in the Carlos Guinle neighborhood in the Brazilian city of Teresópolis, Rio de Janeiro, and occupies an area of 149,000 m^{2} (1,600,000 sq ft) with 8,500 m^{2} (91,000 sq ft) of built area. It was opened on 31 January 1987.

The facility was purchased by the Brazilian Football Confederation in 1978, and inaugurated in 1987, serving as the headquarters for Brazil's preparations in four FIFA World Cups between 1990 and 2010, except for 2006 when the squad players started their training in Europe. For the 2014 FIFA World Cup, hosted by Brazil, CBF spent over R$15m (US$6.7m) reforming Granja Comary so it would again be the national team's headquarters during the tournament. Besides the Brazil national team, Campeonato Brasileiro Série A club Flamengo regularly trains in the center during their pre-season. The place is composed of five football fields, including an Act Global FIFA Certified field.

== Structure ==
The complex consists of five sectors. Only players and technical staff will have access to Sector 1, where only the foundations were kept, as almost everything was rebuilt. The 22 double rooms have been turned into 30 individual en-suite rooms and six doubles. Sector 1 also has a living room, where players may host their family members. In addition, there is also a games room, video game room, exclusive gym, special medical room as well as for physiotherapy, barber, dentist, podiatrist, pharmacy, service area with launderette, stockroom, print works and restaurant.

Sector 2 is where the dressing rooms, football fields, and gym are located, which have also been renovated. The dressing room has a separate area for the technical staff and the players, a spa with a Jacuzzi, cryotherapy baths and saunas. In Sector 2, we have three fields that have been prepared for pre-World Cup training. The same company that has laid down the pitches for the World Cup was in charge of renovations, following the same standards for the pitch and irrigation.

Sector 3 has the multi-purpose gym, which has also been renovated. The floorboard has been changed, the roof was rebuilt to fix some problems and the male and female lavatories totally remodeled.

Sector 4 is the rehabilitation area for injured players.

Sector 5 consists of a stand facing Brazil's training pitches, which now is able to cater for 180 people. In addition, there is an exclusive car park for the press, measuring 1,800 m^{2} (19,000 sq ft), as well as another lot where guests and service providers may park, measuring 600 m^{2} (6,500 sq ft). Throughout its 27-year-long history, Granja Comary has served as temporary home to many players.
