= George March =

English cricketer

Personal information
- Full name: John George March
- Born: 25 November 1932; Ushaw Moor, County Durham, England
- Died: 30 November 2017 (aged 85)
- Batting: Left-handed
- Bowling: Slow left-arm orthodox

Domestic team information
- Years: Team
- 1963–1975: Durham

Career statistics
Competition	List A
Matches	4
Runs scored	91
Batting average	22.75
100s/50s	–/1
Top score	78
Balls bowled	48
Wickets	1
Bowling average	18.00
5 wickets in innings	–
10 wickets in match	–
Best bowling	1/18
Catches/stumpings	–/–
- Source: Cricinfo, 7 August 2011

John George March (25 November 1932 – 30 November 2017) was an English cricketer. March was a left-handed batsman who bowled slow left-arm orthodox. He was born in Ushaw Moor, County Durham.

March made his debut for Durham against the Lancashire Second XI in the 1963 Minor Counties Championship. He played Minor counties cricket for Durham from 1963 to 1975, making 55 Minor Counties Championship appearances. He made his List A debut against Oxfordshire in the 1972 Gillette Cup. He made 3 further List A appearances for Durham, the last of which came against Essex in the 1973 Gillette Cup. In his 4 List A matches, he scored 91 runs at an average of 22.75, with a high score of 78. This score came against Surrey in the 1972 Gillette Cup. With the ball, he took a single wicket which came at an overall cost of 18 runs.
