= Alto, Teresópolis =

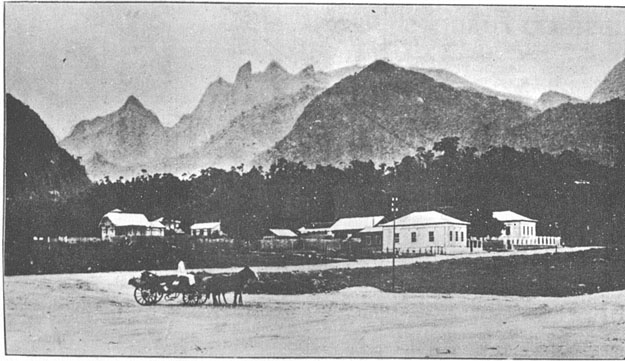

Alto is a neighborhood located in Teresópolis, Rio de Janeiro state, Brazil.

== Feirinha do Alto ==
The Feirinha do Alto, officially named Feirarte, is a traditional fair hosted in Alto neighborhood. It started in 1973 by a group of Teresópolis citizens and South American visitors. Teresópolis City Hall made the event official in 1985. The vendors sell mostly handcrafted products and food. More than 800 people sell their products.

== Sports ==
Teresópolis Futebol Clube is the neighborhood's football (soccer) team.
