= Teresópolis =

Municipality in Rio de Janeiro, Brazil

Teresópolis Município de Teresópolis
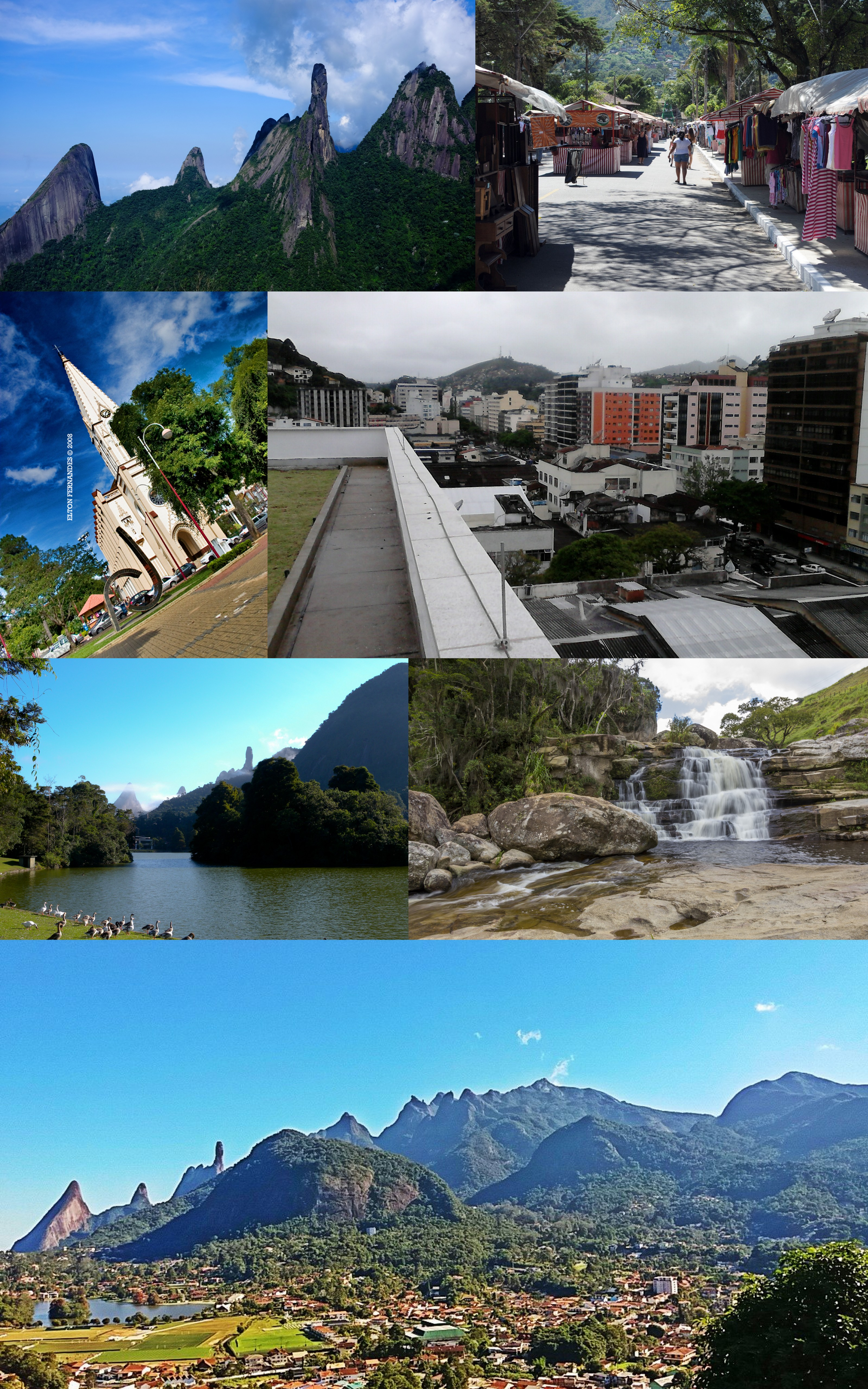
- Top left:Dedo de Deus in Serra dos Órgãos National Park, Top right:A view of Feirinha do Alto area, Second left:Matriz de Santa Teresa church in Baltasar Square, Second right:Agrioes downtown area,Third left:Lago Comary (Comary Lake),Third right:Cachoeira dos Friars Natural Park, Bottom:A view of Carlos Guinle area

- Flag Coat of arms
- Nickname: Terê
- Motto: "Sub Digitum Dei" (Latin for, "Under God's Finger")
- Location of Teresópolis in the state of Rio de Janeiro
- Coordinates: 22°24′43″S 42°57′57″W
- Country: Brazil
- Region: Southeast
- State: Rio de Janeiro
- Founded: 1891
- Named for: Teresa Cristina of the Two Sicilies

Government
  - Mayor: Vinicius Claussen

Area
  - Total: 773.338 km^{2} (298.587 sq mi)
- Elevation: 871 m (2,858 ft)

Population (2022 Brazilian Census)
  - Total: 165,123
  - Estimate (2025): 176,735
  - Density: 213.520/km^{2} (553.014/sq mi)
- Time zone: UTC-3 (UTC-3)
- Website: teresopolis.rj.gov.br

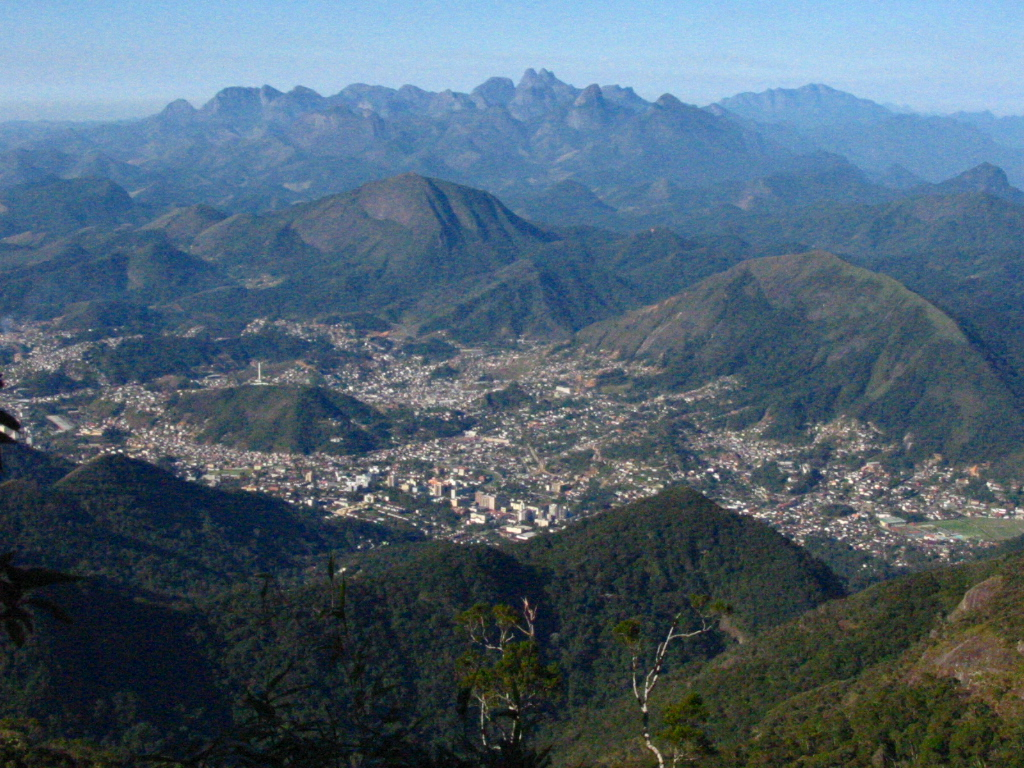
Panoramic view of Teresópolis, from Pedra do Sino

Teresópolis is a Brazilian municipality located in the interior of the state of Rio de Janeiro, approximately 94 km (58 mi) from the state capital. Situated in the Serra Fluminense, it forms part of the Intermediate Geographic Region of Petrópolis and has a total area of just over 770 km^{2} (300 sq mi), of which approximately 54 km^{2} (21 sq mi) is classified as urban area. +At an elevation of 871 m (2,858 ft), it is the highest municipality in the state. Its population was 165,123 according to the IBGE's 2022 census.

The territory was inhabited before the arrival of European colonists, originally by Indigenous peoples such as the Puri and Tamoio. The region was also used as a route and refuge by Black people escaping from plantations in the Baixada Fluminense. This process was associated with the formation of resistant communities in the mountain range, including the Quilombo da Serra, which historians consider the area's first population center. Settlement expanded during the 19th century, when the Portuguese-British merchant George March acquired land in the area where the Alto neighborhood is now located and established the Santo Antônio farm, situated along the route between Rio de Janeiro and the then Province of Minas Gerais. The farm became a stopping place for muleteers and travelers, encouraging the growth of the district of Santo Antônio de Paquequer. Teresópolis became an independent municipality on 6 July 1891, when Governor Francisco Portela issued a decree separating its territory from Magé. The construction of a railway providing a direct connection to the capital—and its subsequent replacement by a highway—stimulated Teresópolis's economic and urban development.

The municipality is characterized by its mountainous terrain and nationally significant protected areas, including Serra dos Órgãos National Park, Três Picos State Park, and Montanhas de Teresópolis Municipal Nature Park. Its economy and cultural identity are closely associated with tourism, particularly outdoor activities, hotel infrastructure, and events. Teresópolis is also home to the training center of the Brazil national football team, the traditional Feirinha do Alto craft market, which has more than 700 exhibitors, and several sites of historical and architectural interest, including the Mother Church of Saint Teresa, the Church of Saint Anthony of Paquequer, Palacete Granado, Teresa Cristina Palace, Granja Guarani Viewpoint, and Judith Fountain.

== Etymology ==
The name "Teresópolis" combines the anthroponym "Teresa" with the word polis, of Greek origin, and therefore means "city of Teresa". It honors the Brazilian empress Teresa Cristina of the Two Sicilies, wife of Emperor Pedro II of Brazil.

== History ==
=== Origins and settlement ===
Before the first Portuguese arrived in the region of Magé in the 16th century, the territory was inhabited by Indigenous peoples belonging to the Timbira, Tamoio and Temiminó groups, who were associated with the tribe of Araribóia. These peoples were pejoratively called maracajás by their enemies. The higher elevations, corresponding to the present-day Serra dos Órgãos and thus to the area of Teresópolis, were also inhabited by the Guarani, as well as other groups associated with the mountainous regions of southeastern Brazil.

The so-called Quilombo da Serra was also established in the region. It consisted of Indigenous people and escaped Africans who organized themselves into communities in the mountain forests and resisted colonial repression beginning in the mid-17th century. These communities were spread across extensive areas between the Serra dos Órgãos and adjacent river valleys, maintaining cooperative relationships and employing strategies of resistance in the face of colonial expansion.

During the 18th century, several trails were opened up the mountains from Guapimirim, leading to the area where the neighborhood of Três Córregos is now located, in the Second District. One of these routes passed through the Maria da Prata Gorge (now within Três Picos State Park) and continued to Canoas. Another crossed the Soberbo and Garrafão areas (following a route close to that of BR-116, within Serra dos Órgãos National Park) and reached Boa Vista and Paquequer, an area corresponding to the present-day Alto neighborhood.

The first official description of the region where Teresópolis now stands was made in 1788 by Baltazar Lisboa, then the juiz de fora of Rio de Janeiro, by order of the Minister and Secretary of State for Overseas Affairs. Considered one of the earliest systematic records of the region, the description mentions the characteristics of the mountain range and a supposed sertão (hinterland) in the area where the Cascata do Imbuí is now located.

The region was later described by European travelers and naturalists of the 18th and 19th centuries, whose accounts are important sources for its early history.

=== George March and his farm ===
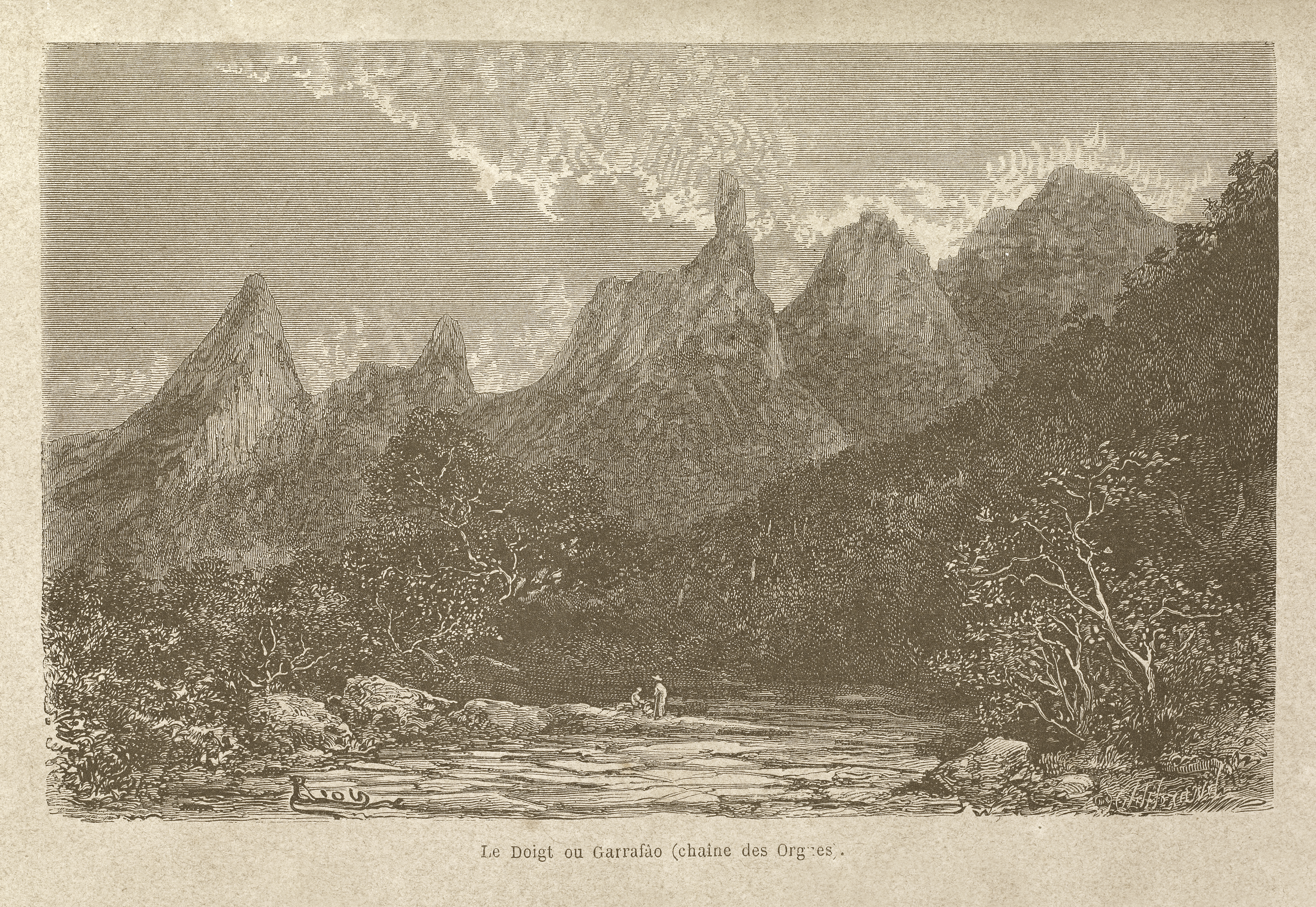
Depiction of the Serra dos Órgãos in 1869.

From the beginning of the 19th century, following colonization, the English were among the first foreigners to settle in Brazil, taking advantage of favorable trading conditions with Portugal, which intensified from 1808 onward with the opening of the ports. In this context, England became Portugal's main trading partner and accounted for a large share of its economic transactions. These circumstances favored British merchants, who achieved high profits through commercial activities, partnerships with local businesspeople, and family ties.

George March, born in 1788, was one of the British immigrants who settled in Brazil. He initially established himself in the Praça Mauá area of central Rio de Janeiro, where in 1813 he founded Barker & March, a firm that imported British industrial goods. He later moved to Botafogo and, around 1818, leased the Sant’Anna do Paquequer farm, located in the Serra dos Órgãos and then part of Magé. The property encompassed four sesmarias and, after March purchased it outright, became known as Fazenda March. It formed the initial nucleus of settlement in the area now corresponding to the Alto neighborhood.

March built the farmhouse in a style inspired by European architectural models and turned the property into a model farm, producing a variety of vegetables and grains and raising animals, including horses at a stud farm. The use of enslaved labor was essential to the operation of the estate, as was common on the large farms of the period.

The farm underwent significant development over the following decades. Accounts by foreign travelers such as Walsh and Gardner describe extensive areas devoted to crops and livestock, as well as the production of vegetables for the Rio de Janeiro market, to which they were regularly transported by pack trains. This agricultural activity helped integrate the region into the capital's economy and marked the beginning of its longstanding market-gardening tradition, which continues to the present day.

The farm was reached by rough mountain paths traveled mainly by horses and mules, which carried both goods and people. A large enslaved population lived on the estate in slave quarters and rudimentary dwellings, reflecting the social conditions of the period.

The farm also became a meeting place for travelers, naturalists, and members of the imperial elite, who recorded their impressions of the region in diaries and illustrations, particularly the Serra dos Órgãos and its distinctive rock formations.

=== March's death and subsequent development ===
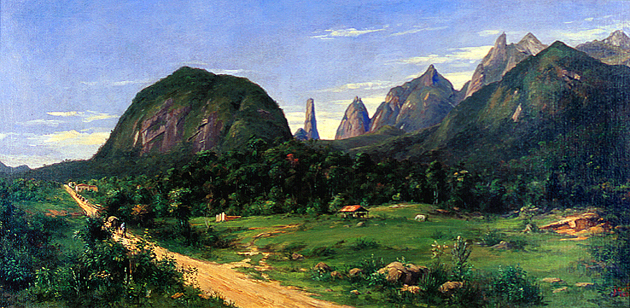
View of the parish of Teresópolis in 1885.

George March died in 1845. In the following years, his heirs began dividing the lands of the former Sant’Anna do Paquequer farm with the assistance of their guardians, John Fulding, John Prince James, and Richard Heath; the division was consolidated from 1850 onward.

Much of the land was purchased by members of the firm Antônio Fernandes Coelho & Cia, who began reselling it in lots, chiefly to buyers from Rio de Janeiro, thereby encouraging settlement in the mountain region. Among the buyers was Colonel Polycarpo José Álvares de Azevedo, a native of Guapimirim, who acquired land near the former farmhouse and undertook initiatives that contributed to the formation of the area's first urban nucleus.

Continuing a tradition established during George March's time, the region became increasingly established as a place of rest and a summer resort for residents of the capital, attracted by its mild climate and mountain scenery. This process encouraged the emergence of small settlements on the subdivided land and began the locality's gradual development. As a result of this growth, on 25 October 1855 the area was elevated to the status of a parish under Provincial Decree No. 829. It was renamed Santo Antônio do Paquequer and officially incorporated into the municipality of Magé. This milestone formalized the settlement's administration and established the region as an organized population center in the province's interior.

=== Emancipation and administrative organization ===
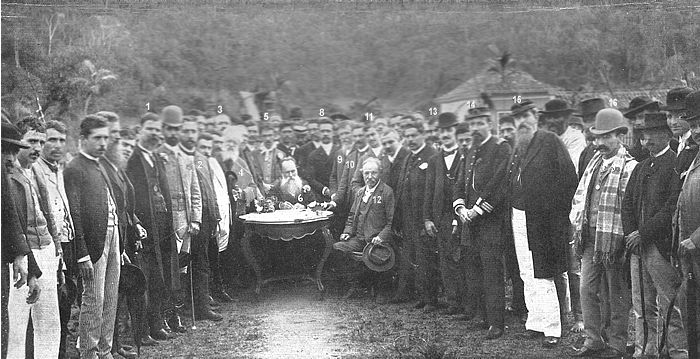
Signing of a contract between state governor Francisco Portela (6) and the Estrada de Ferro Therezópolis company on 7 July 1890.

On 16 June 1890, the state government reached an agreement with businessmen Jerônimo Roberto de Mesquita and Domingos Moitinho, authorizing them to construct railway lines intended to integrate the territory of Rio de Janeiro state. The concession was valid for 70 years and included a guaranteed return on invested capital. The agreement was formalized on 7 July 1890, when Governor Francisco Portela signed a contract with the Estrada de Ferro Therezópolis company that provided not only for construction of the railway but also for the establishment of urban infrastructure.

The project called for a connection between Niterói and the Várzea area, where the nucleus of the future city would be established, as well as the introduction of services such as sanitation, street lighting, trams, and telegraph and telephone networks. The initiative formed part of the economic expansion and modernization policies of the early Republic and was associated with business groups and the financial capital of the period.

Influential figures such as Godofredo Xavier da Cunha and Nicola Antonio Facchinetti attended the signing ceremony, which symbolized the beginning of the project to found the city. The project even included the possible transfer of the state capital to the locality, a proposal Francisco Portela had advocated since the imperial period.

Political and administrative emancipation came on 6 July 1891 through State Decree No. 280, which elevated Santo Antônio do Paquequer to the status of a municipality under the name Teresópolis, in honor of Empress Teresa Cristina, wife of Pedro II.

The district of Santa Rita was created by the same decree. The district of Sebastiana, separated from Nova Friburgo, was later added, establishing the municipality's initial administrative division into three districts.

Despite the expectations it generated, however, the urban and railway development project was not completed as planned. Work was suspended in the following years, a situation attributed in part to the improper use of some of the company's capital on studies and installations that proved unfeasible.

In response, the state government under José Tomás da Porciúncula amended the contract, reducing the benefits granted to the company and redirecting the political project to relocate the capital to the interior; the capital was ultimately transferred to Petrópolis.

=== Arrival of the railway and economic expansion ===
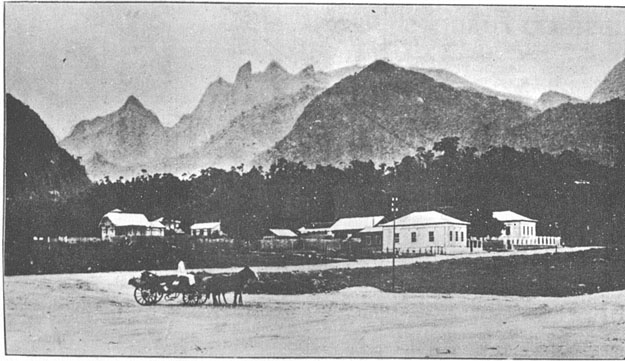
Photograph of Alto in 1911, the principal neighborhood of Teresópolis in the city's early years.

During the 19th century, the train became the principal mode of transport in many parts of the world and played a fundamental role in territorial integration and economic development. In the state of Rio de Janeiro, a pioneer of rail transport in Brazil, the Estrada de Ferro Therezópolis was particularly notable. It ran from the port of Piedade on Guanabara Bay to the district of Guapimirim, crossing the municipality of Magé.

Until the early 20th century, Guapimirim station served as the line's terminus. Work then began on crossing the Serra dos Órgãos, a section that required specialized engineering solutions because of the rugged terrain.

The railway expanded gradually, reaching Barreira in 1904, Miudinho in 1905, and finally the Garrafão and Alto areas in 1908, when it arrived in Teresópolis and the terminal station was officially opened.

The arrival of the railway was a milestone in the region's development. It facilitated the transport of passengers and goods and promoted Teresópolis's integration with the capital. The railway directly contributed to urban growth, rising property values, and the city's establishment as a summer destination, integrating it into the economy of Rio de Janeiro state.

In 1919, the railway came under the administration of the Estrada de Ferro Central do Brasil. It was later extended to the Várzea area, where a new terminal station was built in the following decades, furthering the municipality's urban and economic integration.

The branch line was subsequently incorporated into the Estrada de Ferro Leopoldina, becoming part of a broader rail network that connected the interior of Rio de Janeiro state to the capital.

The railway remained the principal transportation artery until the mid-20th century. The last train journey over the mountain section took place on 9 March 1957, marking the end of its operation and the beginning of its replacement by road transport.

This process was associated with the consolidation of a new road-based transportation model, particularly through the construction of a link between the mountain region and the capital that was later incorporated into the route of the Rodovia Santos Dumont (BR-116). The change reshaped economic flows and contributed to the decline of rail transport in the region.

=== Urban growth and regional development ===
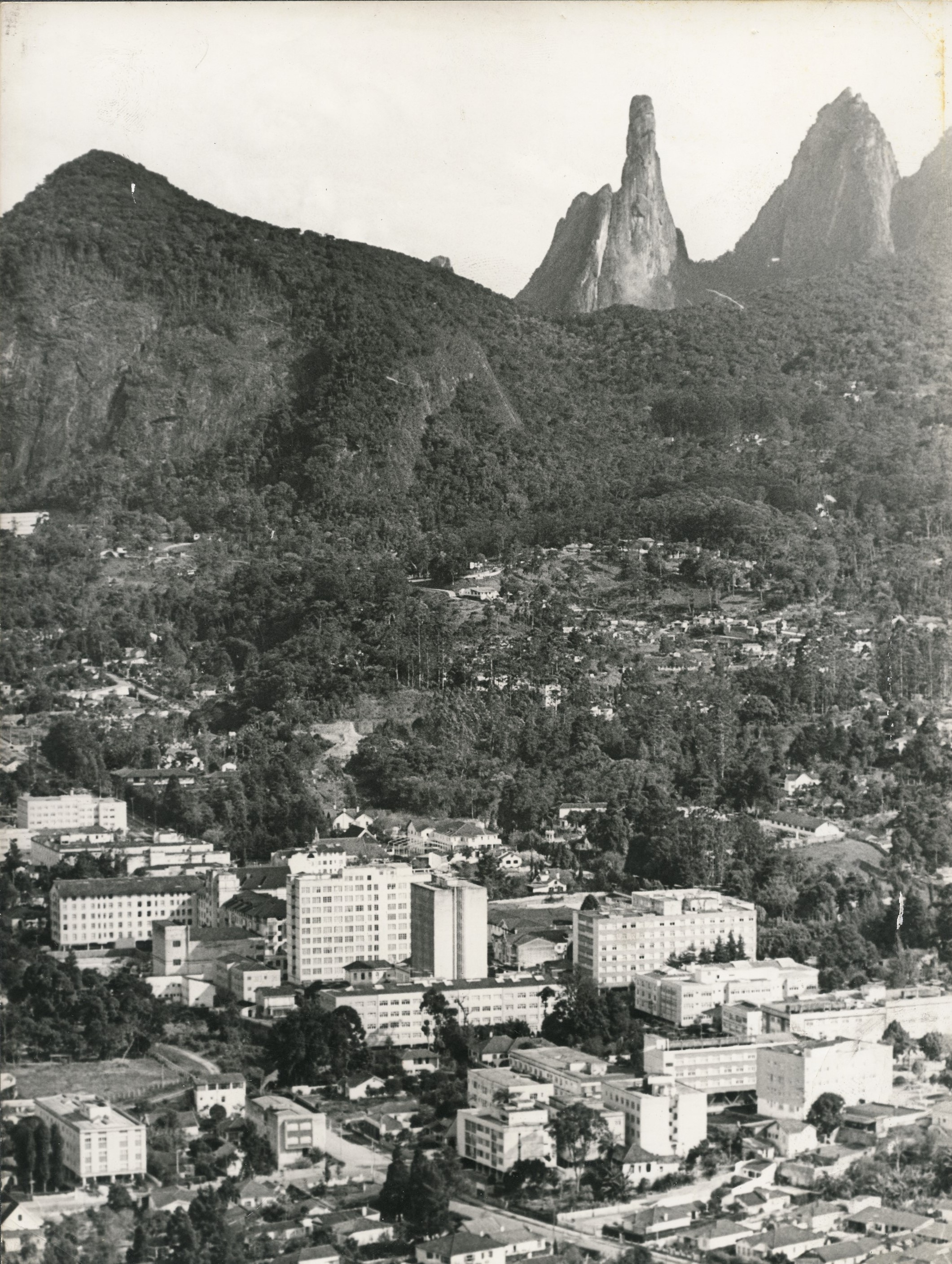
View of the Alto neighborhood from Colina dos Mirantes in 1971.

Beginning in the 1960s, Teresópolis experienced faster urban growth, driven by the consolidation of road connections with the state capital and by the demographic expansion seen in many Brazilian cities during the period. The urban area expanded mainly toward the city's outskirts as demand for housing, infrastructure, and public services increased.

In this context, the municipal government created the Superintendência de Fundos Especiais Municipais (SUFEM; Superintendency of Special Municipal Funds) in 1960. The agency was responsible for implementing housing policies and urbanizing areas occupied by low-income residents. The agency's work involved the expropriation and distribution of land, contributing to the consolidation of working-class neighborhoods and the expansion of the municipality's urban area in subsequent decades.

During the 1960s and 1970s, commerce, services, and tourism became increasingly predominant in the local economy, accompanying the definitive replacement of rail transport by regional road transport. During this period, Teresópolis became established as a tourist destination in the mountainous region of Rio de Janeiro state, drawing visitors mainly from the city of Rio de Janeiro because of its mild climate, mountain scenery, and proximity to the capital.

Urban expansion was accompanied by the appreciation and growth of neighborhoods such as Alto, Várzea, Agriões, and São Pedro, which came to accommodate a significant share of the municipality's commercial and residential activity. During this process, the municipality expanded its public services and strengthened its regional role in education and healthcare.

In 1966, the Fundação Educacional Serra dos Órgãos (FESO) was established to provide higher education and professional training in the mountainous region of Rio de Janeiro state. In the following decades, the institution expanded its academic and healthcare activities, establishing Teresópolis as a regional center for higher education and health services.

Alongside urban growth, agriculture remained economically important, particularly in the rural districts and localities along highway RJ-130, the main route between Teresópolis and Nova Friburgo. The region became known for its production of fruit, vegetables, and other farm goods for the Rio de Janeiro metropolitan area, while activities associated with rural and culinary tourism also grew in economic importance.

During the 1980s and 1990s, Teresópolis continued to experience population growth and an expansion of its tertiary sector, in step with the economic decentralization seen in municipalities of Rio de Janeiro state's interior near the Rio de Janeiro metropolitan area. During this period, the municipality consolidated its position as one of the principal urban centers in the state's mountainous region and increased its regional importance in commerce, education, healthcare, and tourism.

== Geography ==
According to the 2010 Brazilian Census, the city has a population of 163,746 within a land area of 770.6 km2. The Serra dos Órgãos National Park is in the vicinity. Its predominant vegetation belongs to the Atlantic Forest type. The city is surrounded by forests and by well-known summits or peaks, because of which the city is known as the national capital of mountaineering. The most famous peaks are:

- Peak of Pedra do Sino – 2,263 metres (7,425 ft)
- Peak of Pedra do Açu – 2,230 metres (7,320 ft)
- Peak of Agulha do Diabo – 2,020 metres (6,630 ft)
- Peak of Nariz do Frade – 1,919 metres (6,296 ft)
- Peak of Dedo de Deus – 1,651 metres (5,417 ft)
- Peak of Pedra da Ermitage – 1,485 metres (4,872 ft)
- Peak of Dedo de Nossa Senhora – 1,320 metres (4,330 ft)

Of these, Dedo de Deus ("God's finger") is the most famous.

The municipality contains the 4,397-hectare (10,870-acre) Montanhas de Teresópolis Municipal Nature Park, created in 2009 to protect a large area of Atlantic Forest.

The municipality contained the 2,700-hectare (6,700-acre) Floresta do Jacarandá Environmental Protection Area, but this was extinguished in 2013.

It contains the 7,500-hectare (19,000-acre) Bacia dos Frades Environmental Protection Area, created in 1990.

The municipality contains 20% of the 46,350-hectare (114,500-acre) Três Picos State Park, created in 2002.

It contains part of the Central Rio de Janeiro Atlantic Forest Mosaic of conservation units, created in 2006.

=== Climate ===
Teresópolis features a subtropical highland climate (Köppen climate classification: Cfb), with relatively cold and dry winters and mild and wet summers. The annual average temperature is 16 °C/60.8 °F.

Teresópolis has one of the mildest climates in Brazil and this is one reason why the area has been chosen as Brazilian Football Confederation's training headquarters, hosting the Brazil national football team, located in Granja Comary.

Climate data for Teresópolis (1991–2020)
Month	Jan	Feb	Mar	Apr	May	Jun	Jul	Aug	Sep	Oct	Nov	Dec	Year
Mean daily maximum °C (°F)	28.1 (82.6)	28.8 (83.8)	27.4 (81.3)	25.5 (77.9)	23.0 (73.4)	22.6 (72.7)	22.3 (72.1)	23.5 (74.3)	24.3 (75.7)	25.3 (77.5)	25.4 (77.7)	27.0 (80.6)	25.3 (77.5)
Mean daily minimum °C (°F)	19.1 (66.4)	19.0 (66.2)	18.4 (65.1)	16.5 (61.7)	13.8 (56.8)	12.7 (54.9)	12.1 (53.8)	12.7 (54.9)	14.6 (58.3)	16.3 (61.3)	17.2 (63.0)	18.4 (65.1)	15.9 (60.6)
Average precipitation mm (inches)	285.1 (11.22)	179.1 (7.05)	216.9 (8.54)	106.3 (4.19)	69.0 (2.72)	37.3 (1.47)	35.3 (1.39)	32.5 (1.28)	73.1 (2.88)	106.4 (4.19)	231.5 (9.11)	277.4 (10.92)	1,649.9 (64.96)
Average precipitation days (≥ 1.0 mm)	19	15	14	13	9	7	7	8	10	17	18	19	156
Average relative humidity (%)	86.6	85.9	86.6	88.7	87.4	86.3	85.4	83.5	84.4	87.7	88.4	87.2	86.5
Mean monthly sunshine hours	159.7	152.6	162.9	151.1	163.7	158.9	169.4	180.4	144.5	117.0	118.2	137.8	1,816.2
Source: Instituto Nacional de Meteorologia (precipitation days, humidity and sun 1961–1990)

== Demographics ==
Population growth
Census	Population	%±
1940	29,594	—
1950	34,724	17.3%
1960	62,318	79.5%
1970	73,128	17.3%
1980	98,705	35.0%
1991	120,709	22.3%
2000	138,081	14.4%
2010	163,746	18.6%
2022	165,123	0.8%
2025 est.	176,735	7.0%
Source: IBGE

In 2022, the municipality had a population of 165,123 inhabitants, according to that year's demographic census, conducted by the Brazilian Institute of Geography and Statistics (IBGE). Compared with the 2010 census, when the population was 163,746 inhabitants, the municipality recorded growth of approximately 0.8% over the period.

According to the 2022 census, there were 78,469 men (47.52%) and 86,654 women (52.48%). In the same year, 146,010 inhabitants lived in the urban area and 19,113 in the rural area.

In 2022, the age structure of Teresópolis consisted of 30,982 inhabitants aged 0 to 14, 109,872 aged 15 to 64, and 24,269 aged 65 or older. The sex ratio was approximately 90.6 men for every 100 women.

In 2010, life expectancy at birth was 76.27 years, while the total fertility rate was 1.56 children per woman. The aging rate was 9.01, and the probabilities of living to age 40 and age 60 were 93.55 and 84.39, respectively. The Municipal Human Development Index (MHDI) of Teresópolis was 0.730 in 2010, a value classified as high.

With respect to municipal subdivisions, in 2010 the seat district had 135,459 inhabitants, while the districts of Vale do Paquequer and Vale de Bonsucesso had 11,947 and 16,340 inhabitants, respectively. Among the most populous neighborhoods were São Pedro, Várzea, and Barra do Imbuí.

=== Socioeconomic issues ===
In 2010, socioeconomic indicators pointed to income inequality in the municipality. According to the Atlas of Human Development in Brazil, about 8.4% of the population had a household per capita income below R$140.00 per month. The richest 20% accounted for 64.9% of total municipal income, while the poorest 20% accounted for 3.2%.

The Gini coefficient, which measures income inequality, was 0.569 in 2010.

In 2022, the municipality had high levels of favelaization in comparison with other Brazilian municipalities, with 49 favelas and urban communities identified by IBGE. These areas were home to about 31.11% of the population, approximately 51,370 inhabitants, and 25.44% of households. In the state context, Teresópolis was among the municipalities with the highest proportion of residents living in these territories, alongside cities such as Angra dos Reis and Arraial do Cabo.

=== Ethnic composition and nativity ===
According to the 2022 census, the population of Teresópolis was composed of 59.27% White people, 30.19% Pardo people, 10.21% Black people, 0.24% Asian people, and 0.08% Indigenous people.

Regarding nativity, in 2022 about 99.44% of the population were native-born Brazilians, 0.21% were naturalized citizens, and 0.35% were foreign nationals.

Among people who had not lived in the same federation unit five years before the census, the main previous places of residence were Minas Gerais (400), São Paulo (246), Espírito Santo (148), Rio Grande do Norte (141), and abroad (117).

Among people who had not lived in Brazil five years before the census reference date, the main previous countries of residence were the United States (20), Australia (12), Indonesia (12), the United Kingdom (12), Uruguay (12), Spain (11), Portugal (11), France (10), Paraguay (10), and Haiti (7).

=== Religion ===
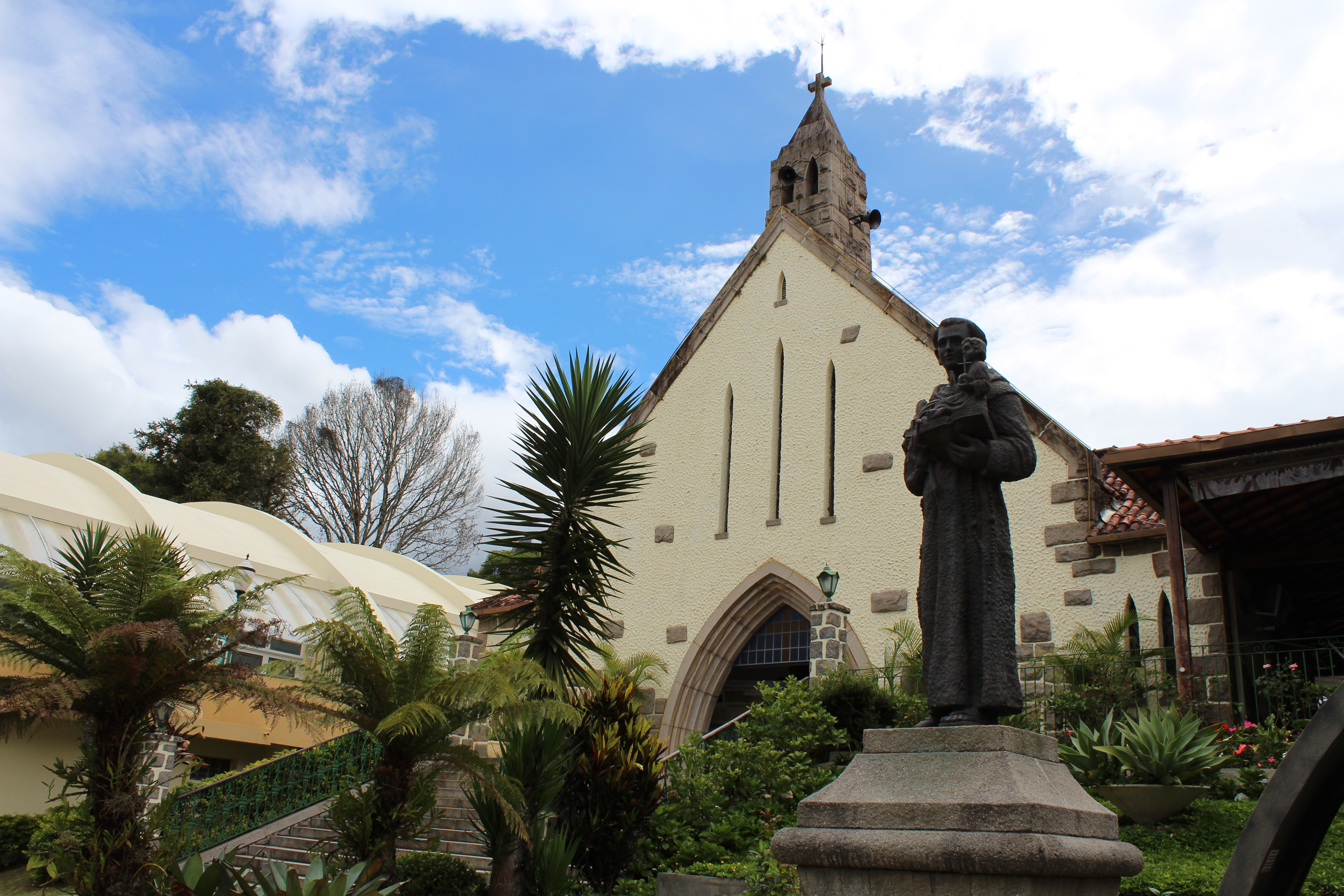
Church of Santo Antônio, located in Alto.

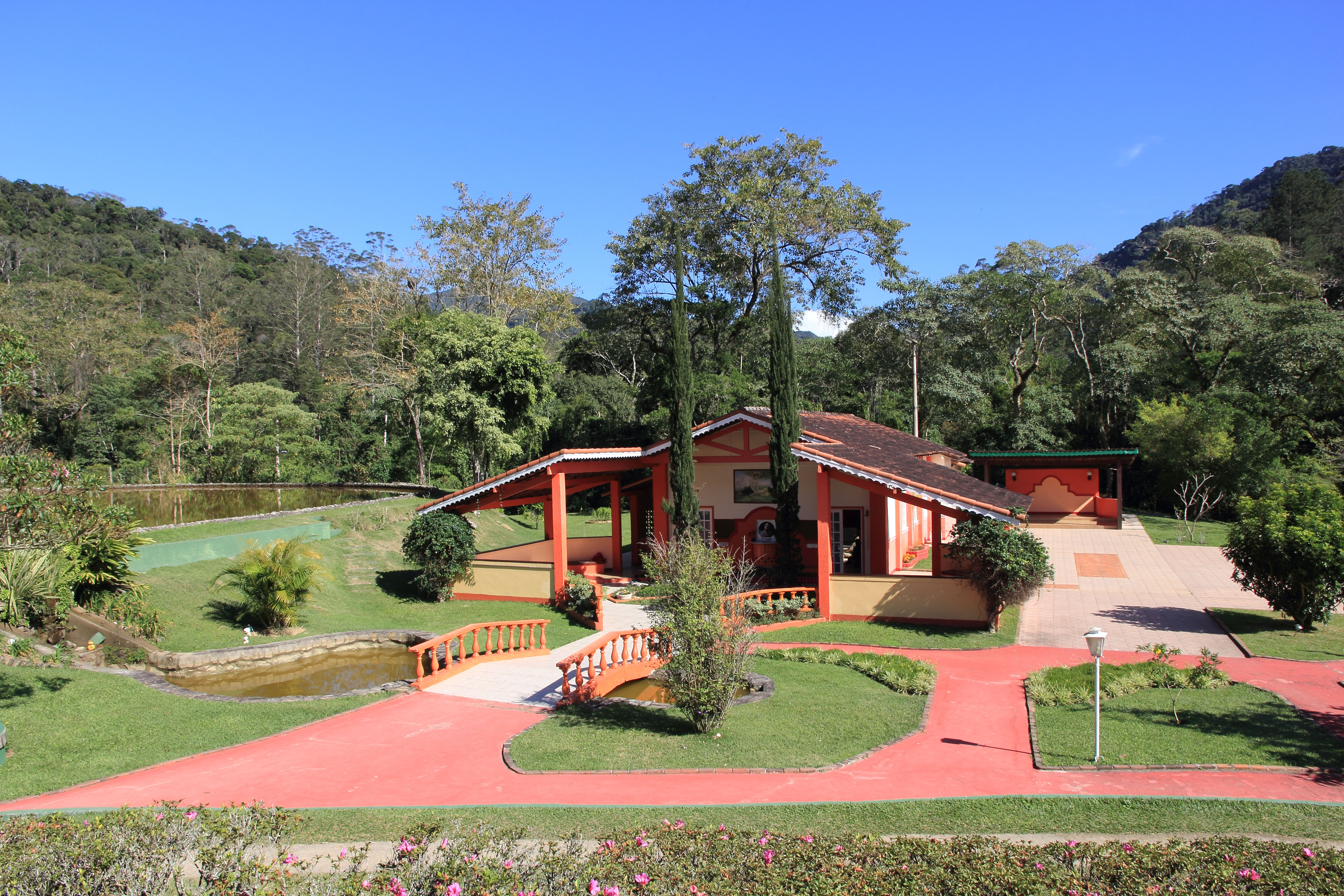
A Hare Krishna temple located in Albuquerque.

According to the 2022 census, among residents aged 10 or older, the largest religious group in Teresópolis was Catholics, followed by Evangelicals and people with no religion.

Religion in Teresópolis, 2022
Religion	Percentage
Catholic	39.06%
Evangelical	33.98%
No religion	17.85%
Other religions	5.23%
Spiritism	2.45%
Umbanda and Candomblé	1.23%
Undeclared	0.19%
Traditional religions	0.00%
Unknown	0.00%

=== Politics and administration ===
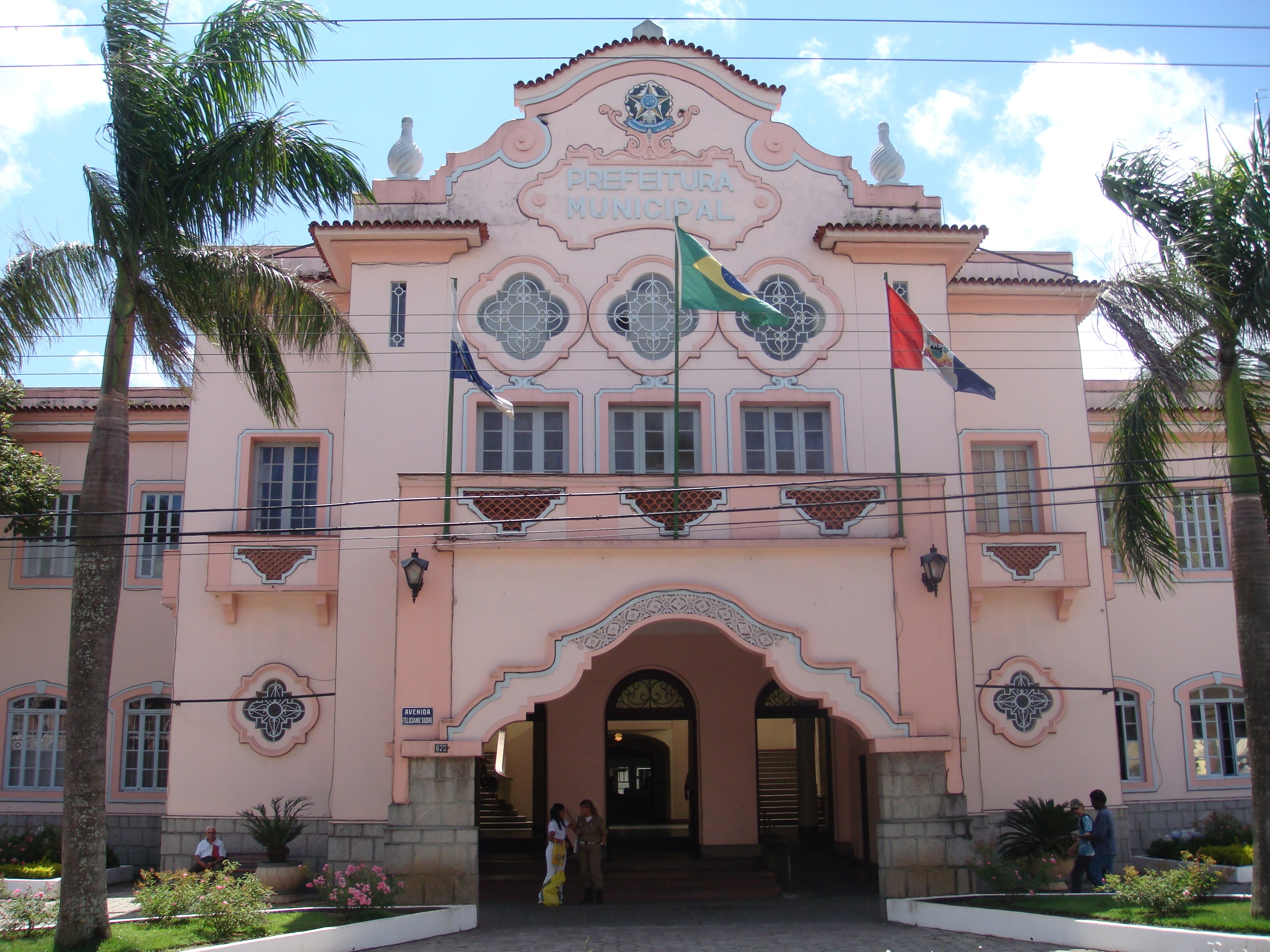
Palácio Teresa Cristina, seat of the municipal executive.

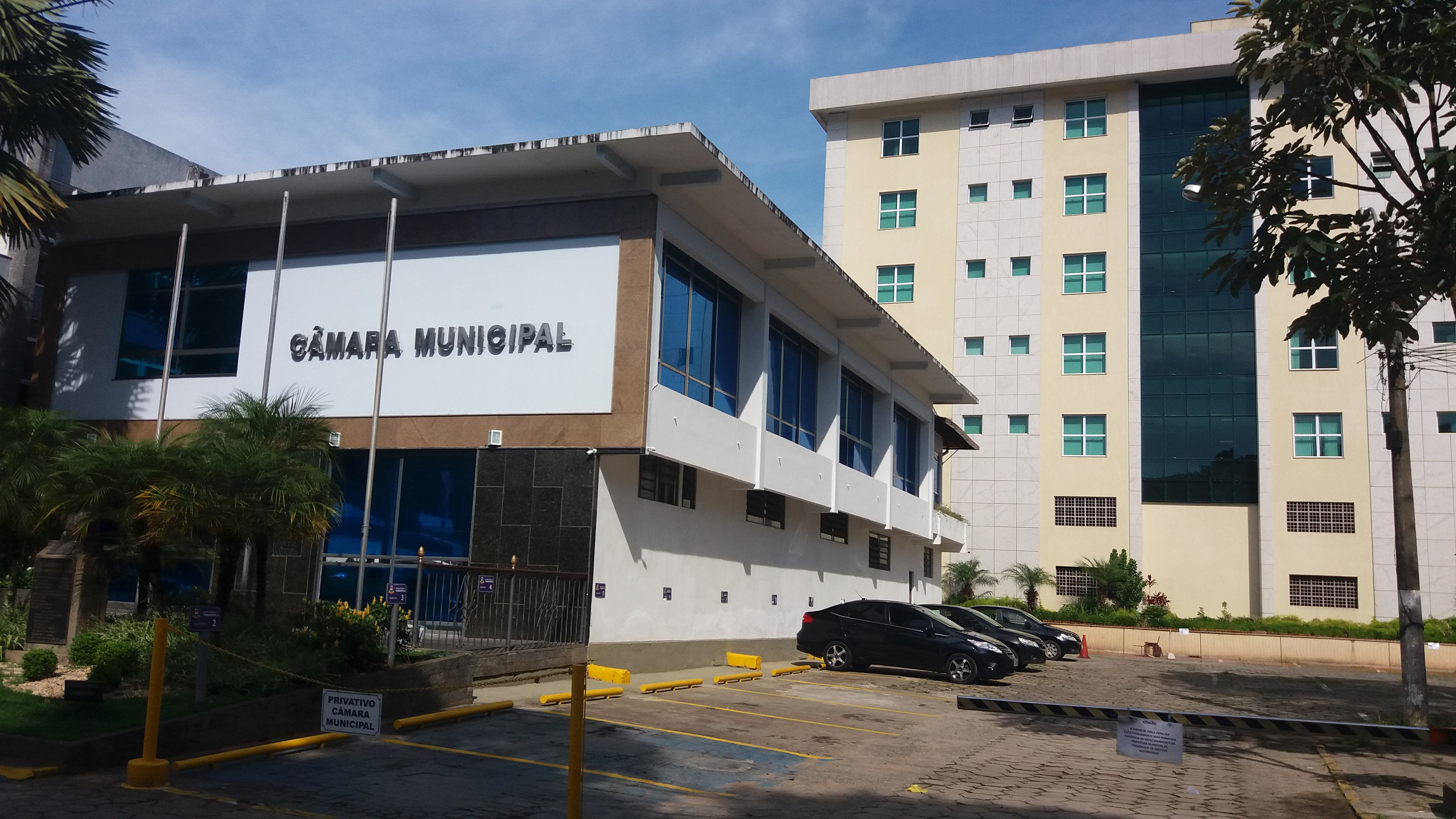
Seat of the municipal legislature.

The municipality of Teresópolis is governed by its organic law, promulgated on 5 April 1990. The municipal administration is exercised by the executive and legislative branches.

The mayor is the head of the executive branch, assisted by the deputy mayor and municipal secretaries. In the 2024 Teresópolis municipal election, Leonardo Vasconcellos was elected mayor for União Brasil, with a term from 2025 to 2028; his deputy mayor is Afaf Ribeiro.

The legislative branch is exercised by the Municipal Chamber, composed of twenty-one councillors elected to four-year terms, responsible for drafting laws and overseeing the executive branch.

The municipality had 122,560 voters in 2020, distributed between the 38th and 195th electoral zones of the state of Rio de Janeiro.

Within the judiciary, Teresópolis is the seat of a state judicial district, with its court located at the Juiz Ivo de Carvalho Werneck Forum, as well as a federal judicial subsection and a labor court linked to the Regional Labor Court of the 1st Region.

== Culture and leisure ==
=== Tourism ===
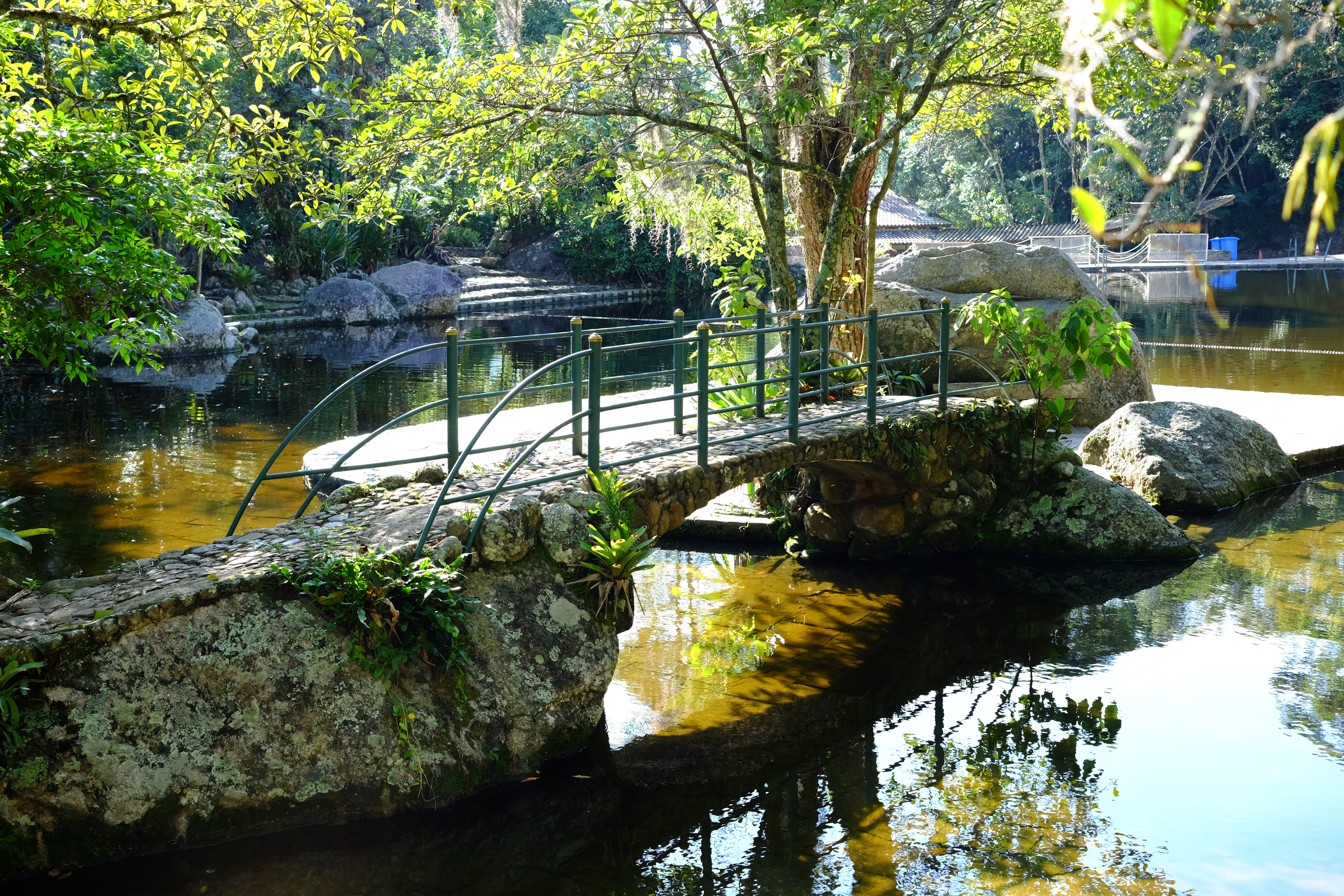
Swimming area at the national park's headquarters, one of the most popular natural attractions.

Like that of other cities in the Serra Fluminense, the economy of Teresópolis is based primarily on tourism, and the city has a variety of natural and urban attractions. Foremost among its natural attractions is the headquarters of Serra dos Órgãos National Park (PARNASO), which was established on 30 November 1939 and is currently managed by the Chico Mendes Institute for Biodiversity Conservation (ICMBio). A notable ecotourism destination is the Serra do Subaio, which contains several of the municipality's rural attractions, including numerous trails, mountains, and waterfalls. Among these is Mulher de Pedra, whose outline resembles a reclining woman. Other attractions include the Torres de Bonsucesso, located in the Bonsucesso neighborhood in the city's third district; Orquidário Aranda, founded in 1985 in the Quebra-Frascos neighborhood, where a wide variety of orchid species and hybrids are displayed and sold; and the Terê-Fri Tourist Circuit, as highway RJ-130 is known. The 67-kilometre (42 mi) highway serves as a major tourist corridor through the region and is lined with numerous inns and country hotels. It also provides access to the Três Picos de Salinas, an important natural monument in Três Picos State Park, and to Pedra da Tartaruga, a turtle-shaped rock formation that is a popular location for rappelling and a meeting place for off-road enthusiasts.

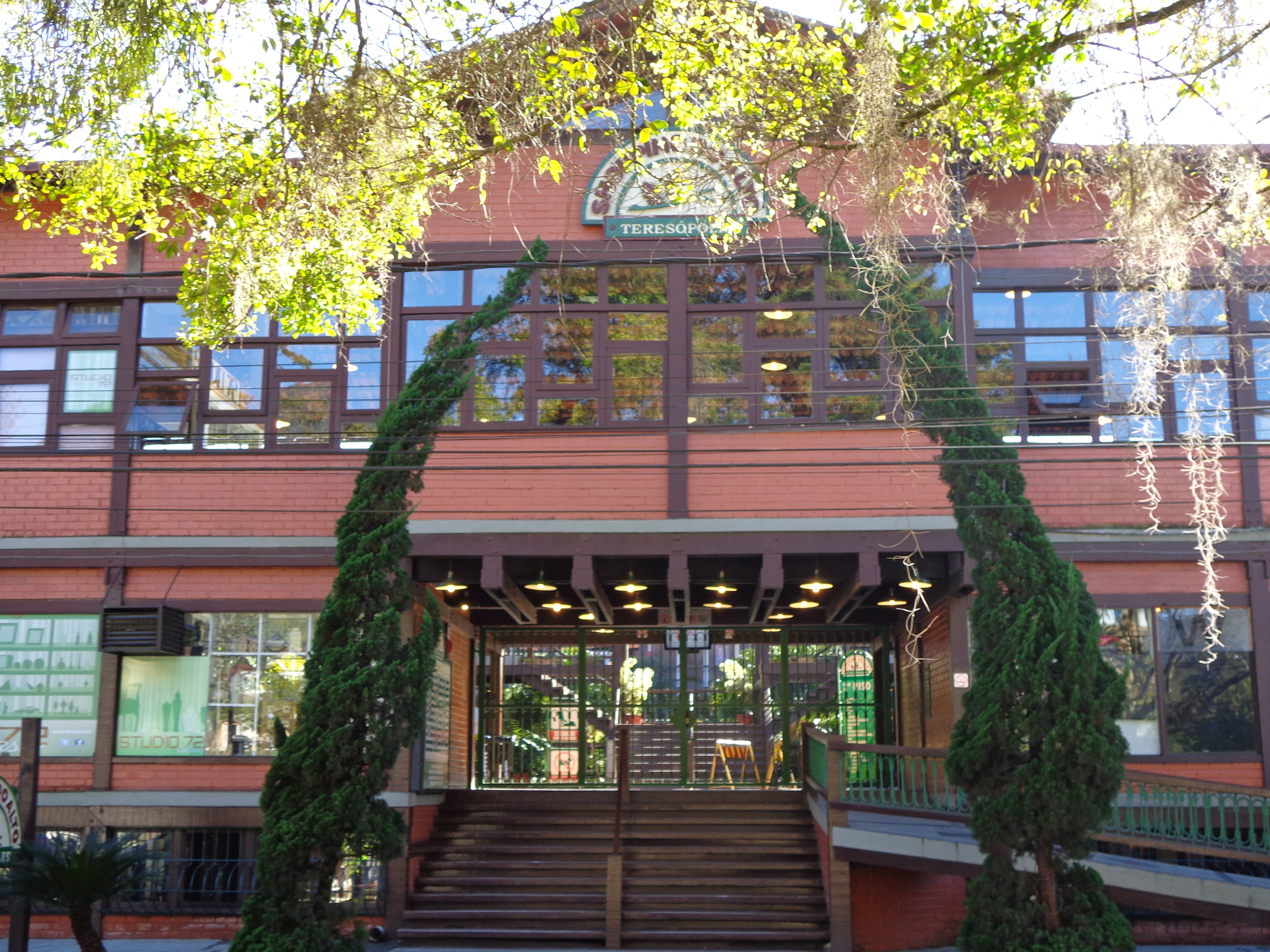
Shopping do Alto, one of Teresópolis's urban leisure attractions.

The main urban attractions include Castelo Montebello Medieval, whose architecture evokes the era of feudal lords and which served as a setting for the adventures of the Jovem Guarda as well as for numerous gatherings of local high society; Colina dos Mirantes, located atop Fazendinha hill, which offers views over much of the municipality's urban area and the Serra dos Órgãos massif; Feirarte (the Teresópolis Handicrafts Fair), also known as Feirinha do Alto, which has operated since 1983 and brings together artisans from various fields in more than 700 stalls; the imposing Higino Palace Hotel in Alto, a former luxury establishment dating from the Vargas Era; the Mother Church of Saint Teresa, built in the Gothic Revival style in honor of the city's patron saint, Teresa of Ávila; and Mirante do Soberbo, also known as Mirante da Vista Soberba, situated at the entrance to the city. From the viewpoint, visitors can see Dedo de Deus, one of the region's landmarks and a symbol of Brazilian mountaineering, as well as Escalavrado, Boca do Peixe, and other features of the Serra dos Órgãos. Other attractions include Palacete Granado, which now houses SESC Teresópolis and offers a variety of cultural and leisure activities; the building formerly hosted the National Film Festival before it was transferred to Gramado; Teresa Cristina Palace, the current seat of the municipal government; and the Adolpho Bloch House of Culture, near the Alto neighborhood, which hosts exhibitions and presentations encompassing various forms of artistic expression.

=== Sport ===
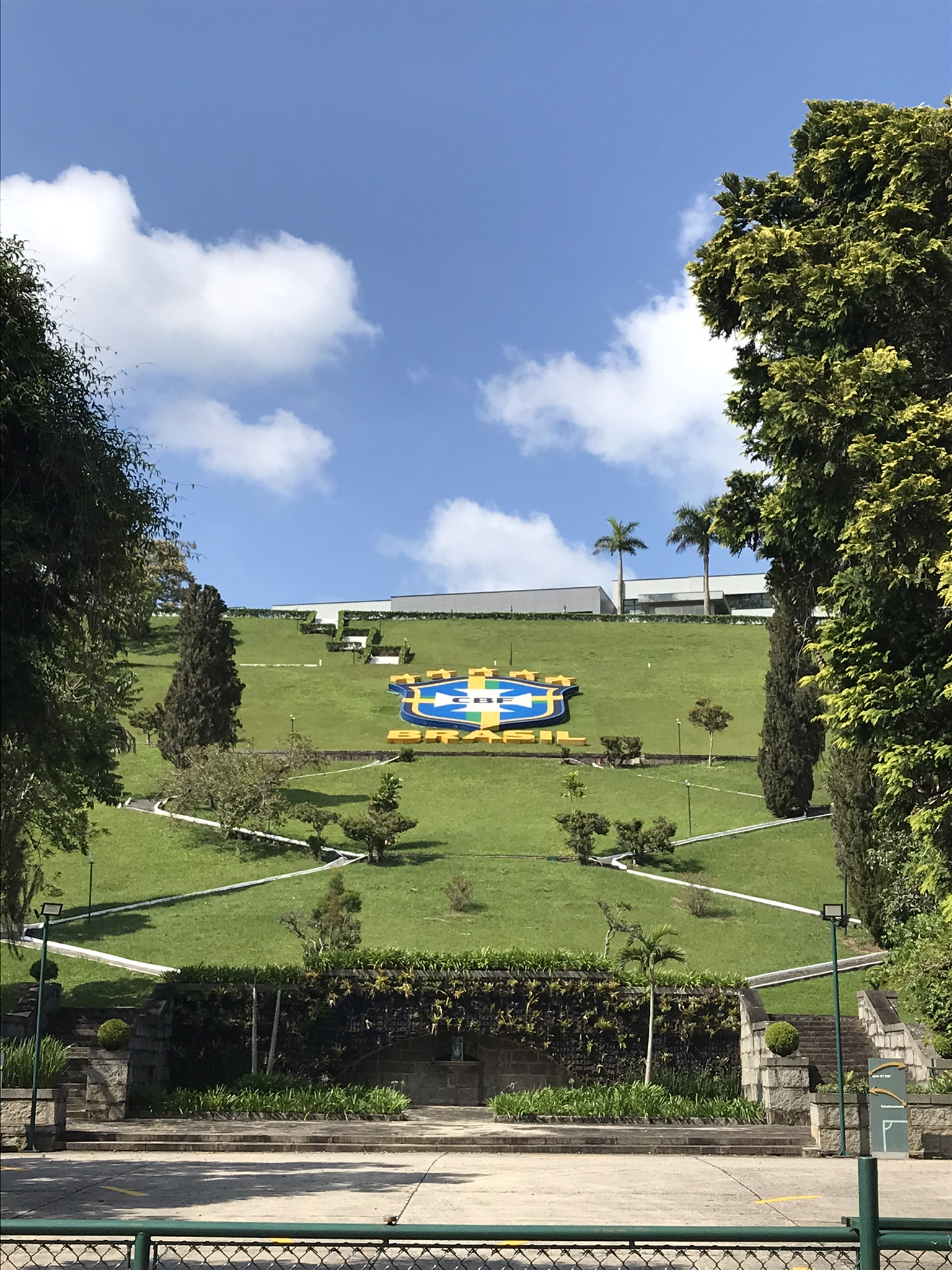
Granja Comary serves as the training center for every division of the Brazil national football team.

Teresópolis is nationally known as the home of the Brazilian Football Confederation, where the national team trains. The complex encompasses more than 150,000 m^{2} (37 acres) of green space divided among five pitches and includes facilities for supporting the athletes, making it one of the world's most modern training centers. The confederation's extensive grounds are also a tourist attraction. In addition to the senior national team, other CBF-sponsored divisions use the complex, which is located in Granja Comary, one of the city's most attractive neighborhoods.

Among the city's local sporting venues is Ginásio Pedrão, which is frequently used for futsal and Brazilian jiu-jitsu events. The complex also houses the Municipal Sports Museum, while the nearby Alexandre Oliveira Extreme Sports Park, beside the bus terminal, provides facilities for extreme sports. For a time, it was regarded as one of Brazil's best skate parks and even hosted a national championship.

Surrounded by natural areas, the city is known as Brazil's national capital of mountaineering. Many residents of Teresópolis participate in the sport, and some have achieved international recognition. Among them was Mozart Catão, one of Brazil's foremost mountaineers and the first Brazilian to climb Mount Everest. Catão died while climbing the south face of Aconcagua in Argentina after being swept away by an avalanche. Places such as Serra dos Órgãos National Park are popular mountaineering destinations. The park contains Pedra do Sino, the highest point in the Serra dos Órgãos, as well as Escalavrado, Nariz do Frade, Agulha do Diabo, Dedo de Nossa Senhora, and Pedra do Elefante. Another notable feature is Mulher de Pedra, located in Vargem Grande along the Terê-Fri Circuit between Teresópolis and Nova Friburgo. It forms part of Montanhas de Teresópolis Municipal Nature Park, which also contains Pedra da Tartaruga, a popular rappelling site and meeting place for off-road enthusiasts. In addition to mountaineering, equestrianism is popular among residents and tourists, particularly because the area offers suitable terrain for the sport.

Although association football has a long tradition in the municipality, it has achieved little prominence at state or national level. The main clubs are Teresópolis and Várzea, both more than a century old, and Barra, which has existed for more than half a century. Of these clubs, Barra has had the greatest success, finishing as runner-up in the 1995 Copa Rio after losing to Volta Redonda in the final. Teresópolis has participated in more professional competitions than the other clubs in recent years, but a lack of support has prevented it from remaining in a higher division.

=== Gastronomy ===
In addition to its natural scenery, Teresópolis is known for its diverse cuisine. Restaurants and bars are active throughout the day and night. The city has restaurants serving a range of international cuisines, including German, Russian, French, Italian, Portuguese, and Japanese.

== Gallery ==
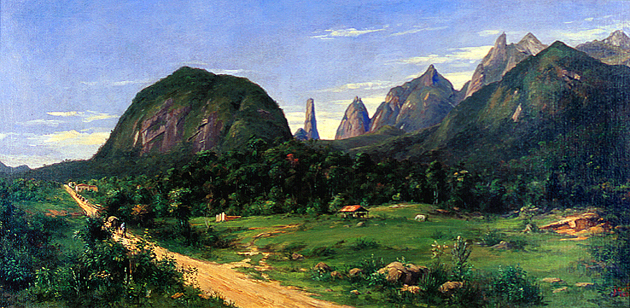
Teresópolis in 1885

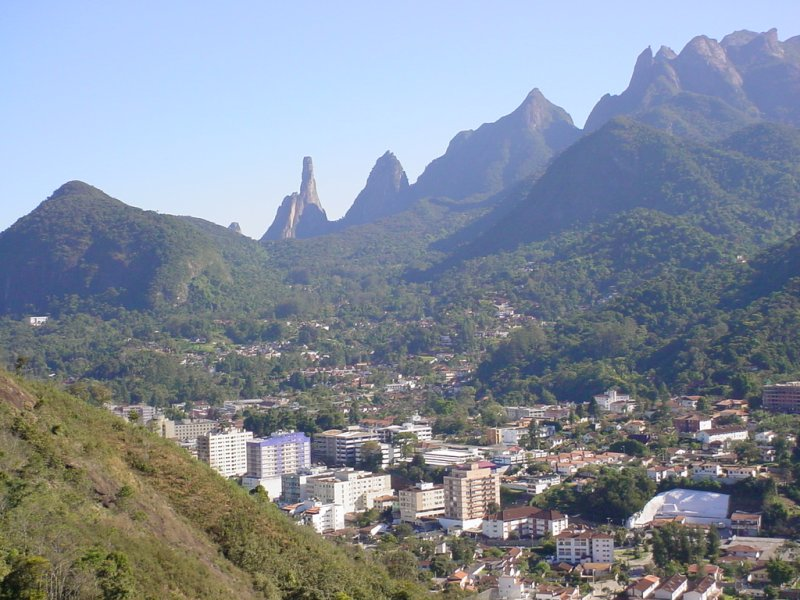
Partial view of the municipality

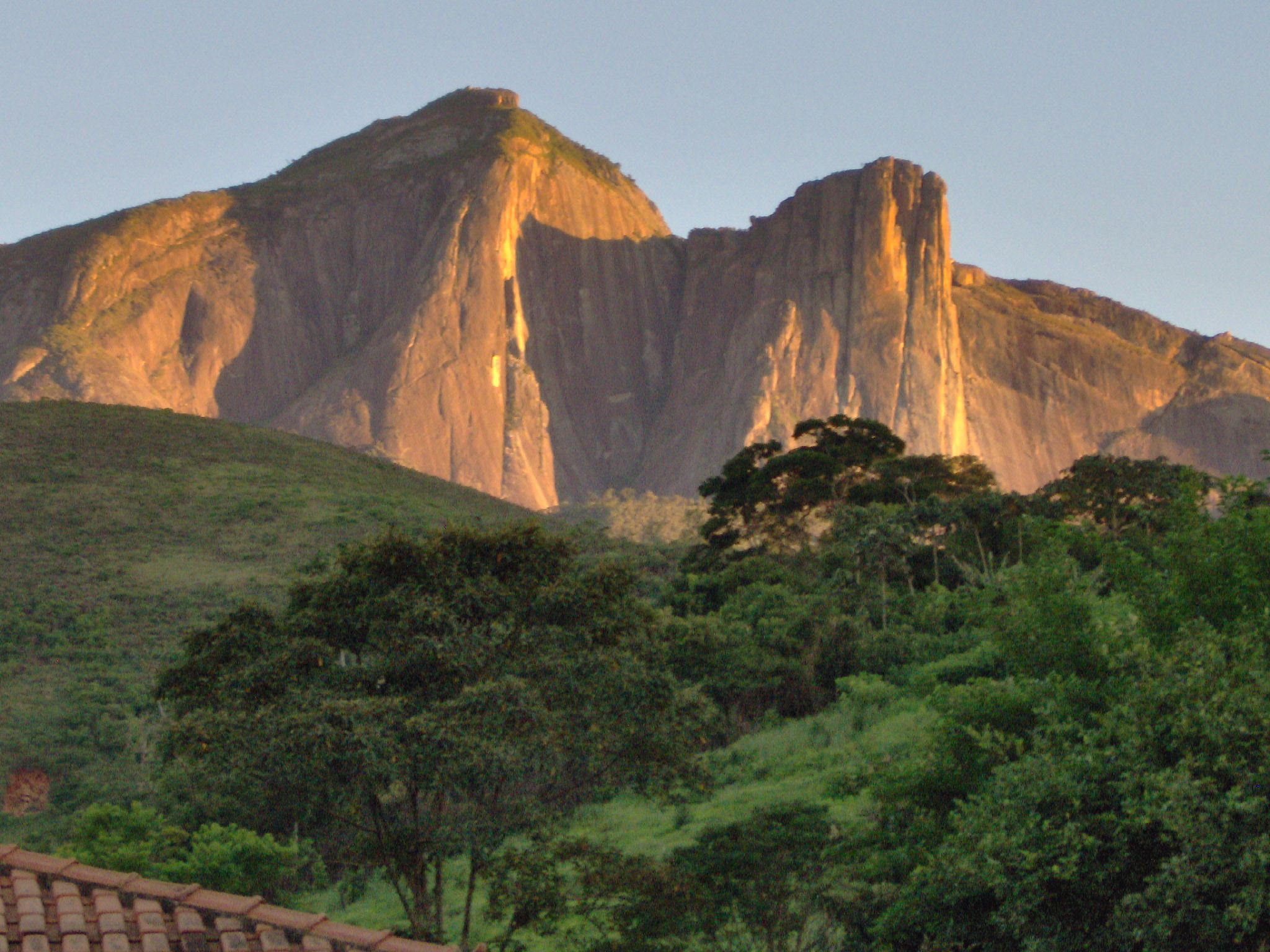
Torres de Bonsucesso

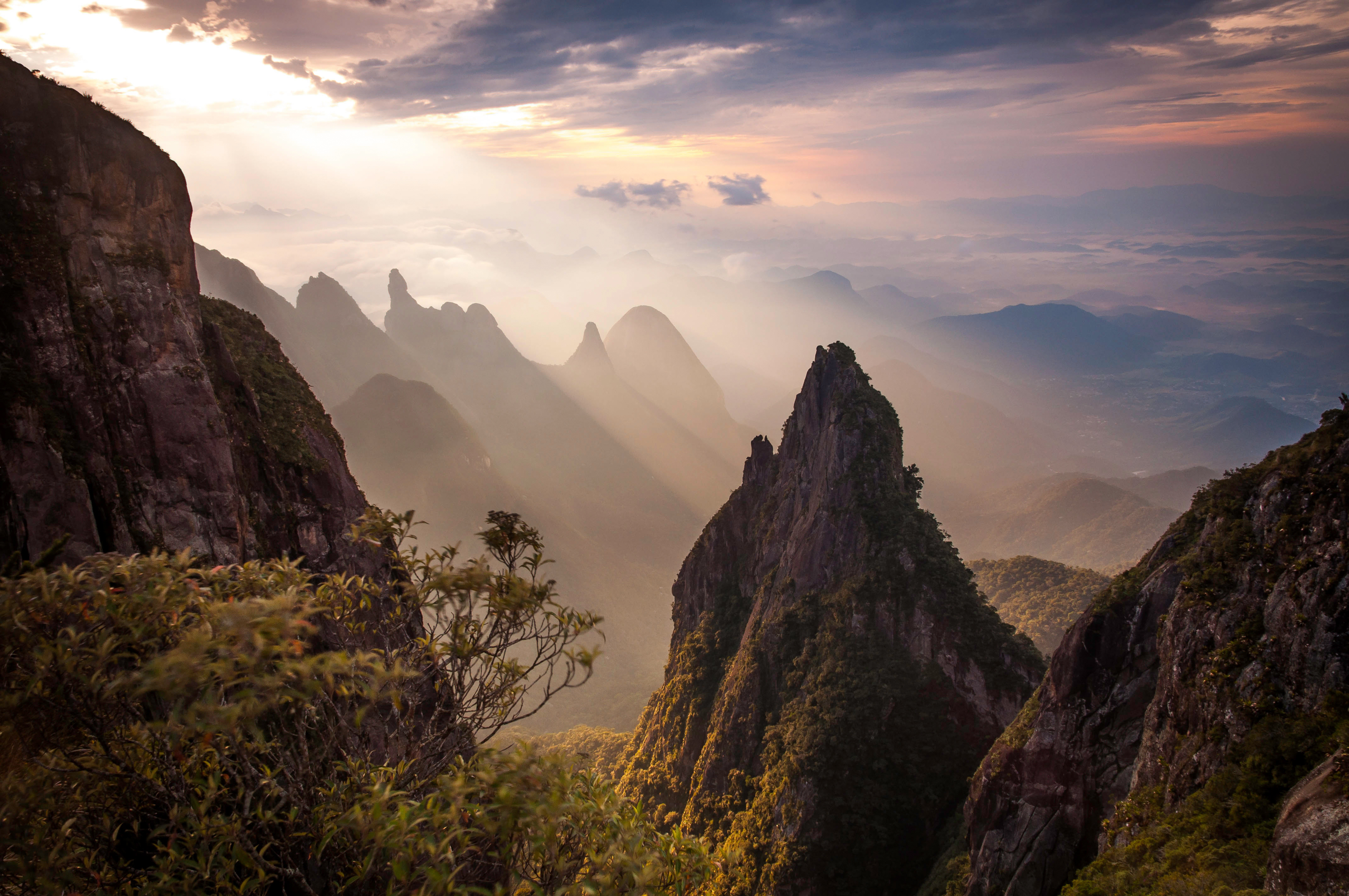
Serra dos Órgãos National Park

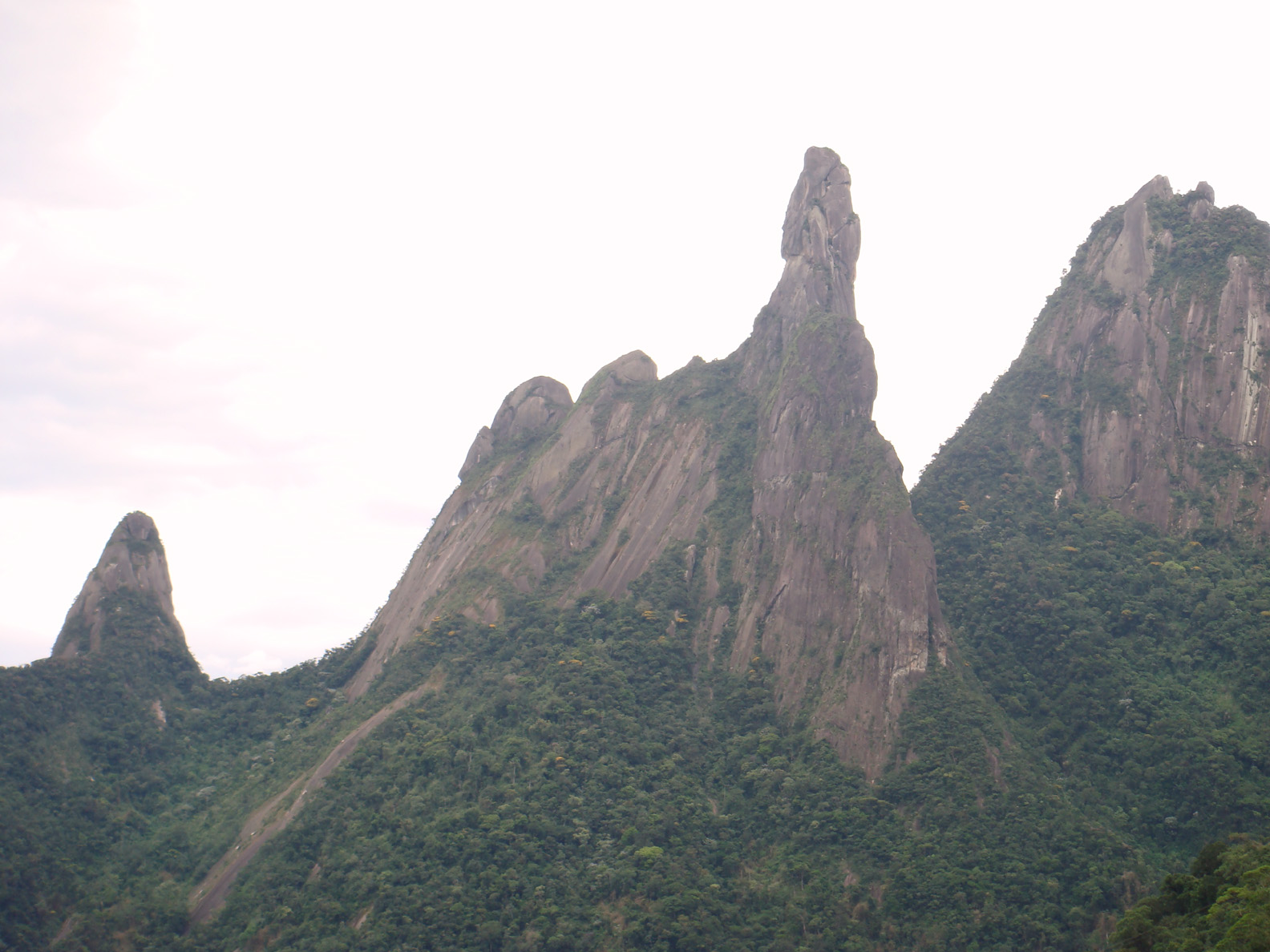
God's Finger

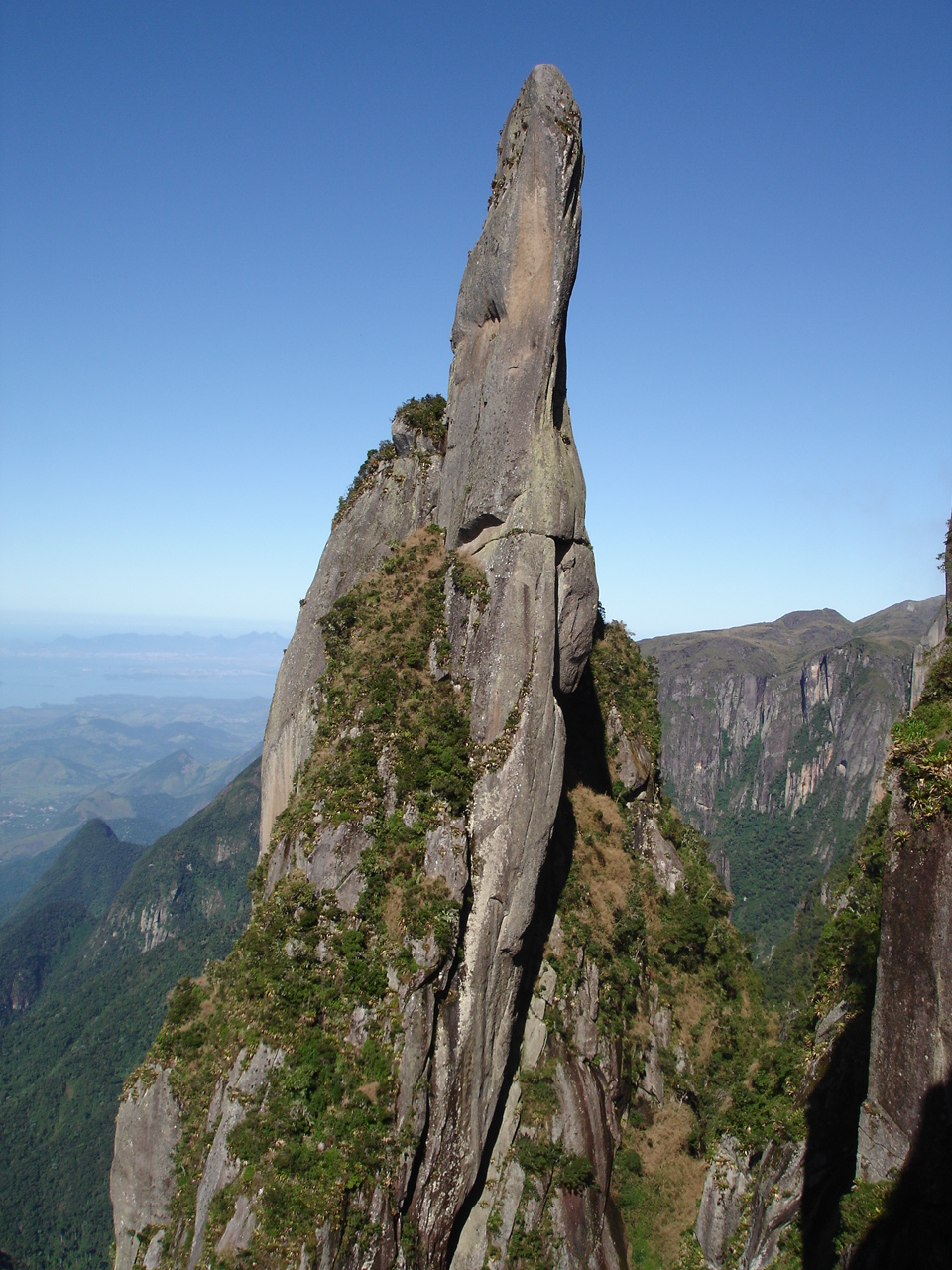
Devil's Needle

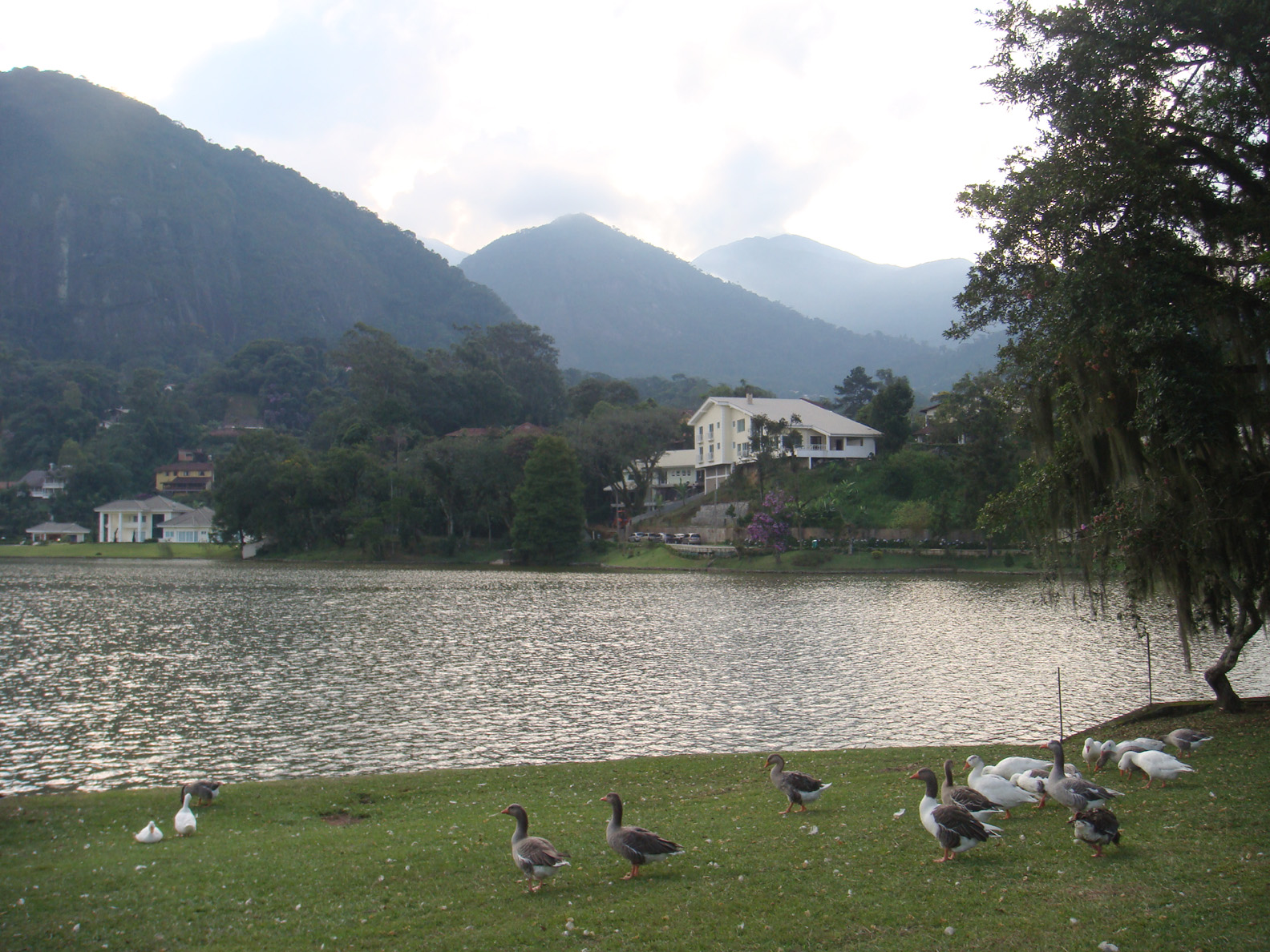
Lake Comary

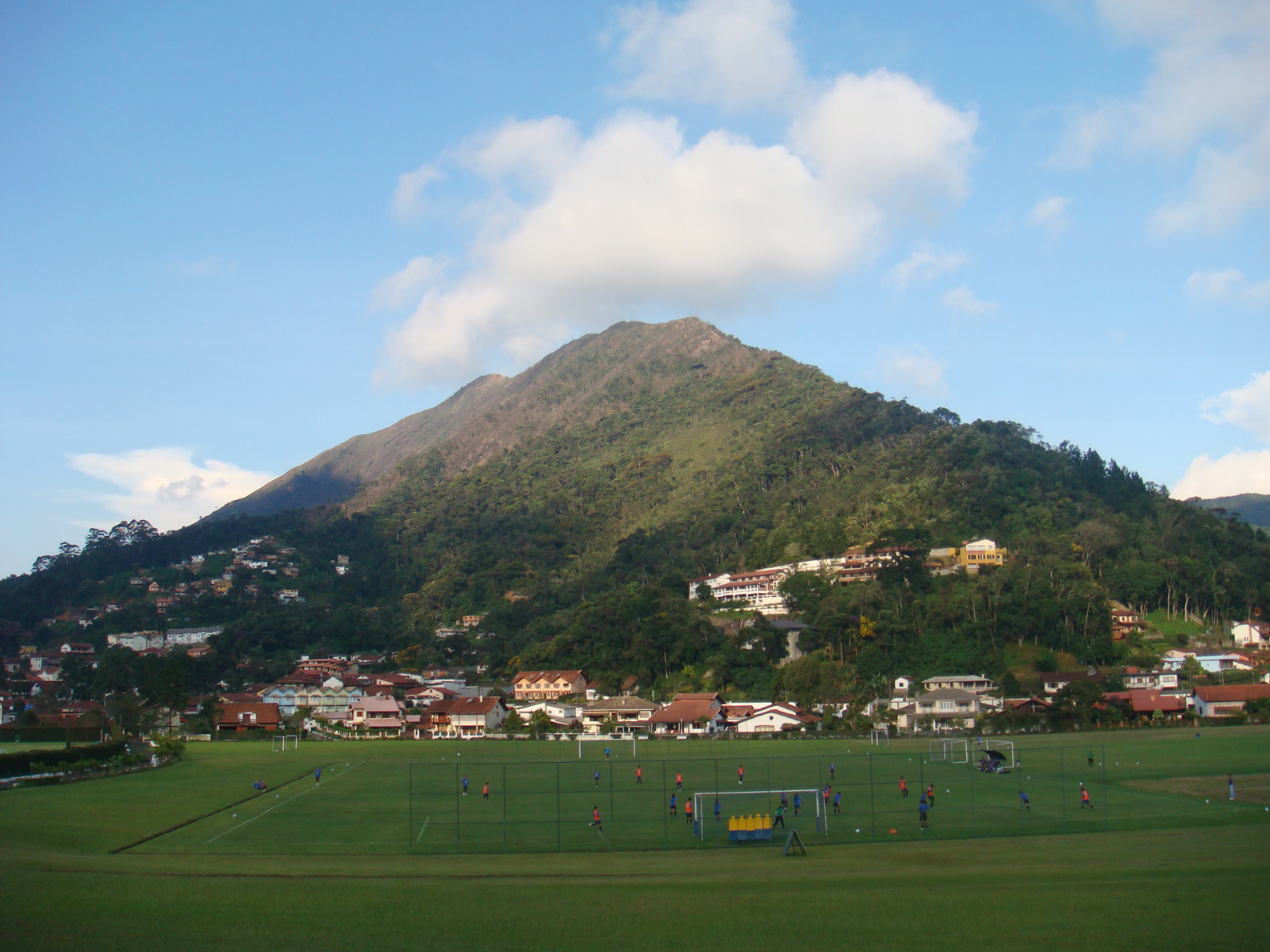
Granja Comary, The Brazilian Football Confederation's training ground

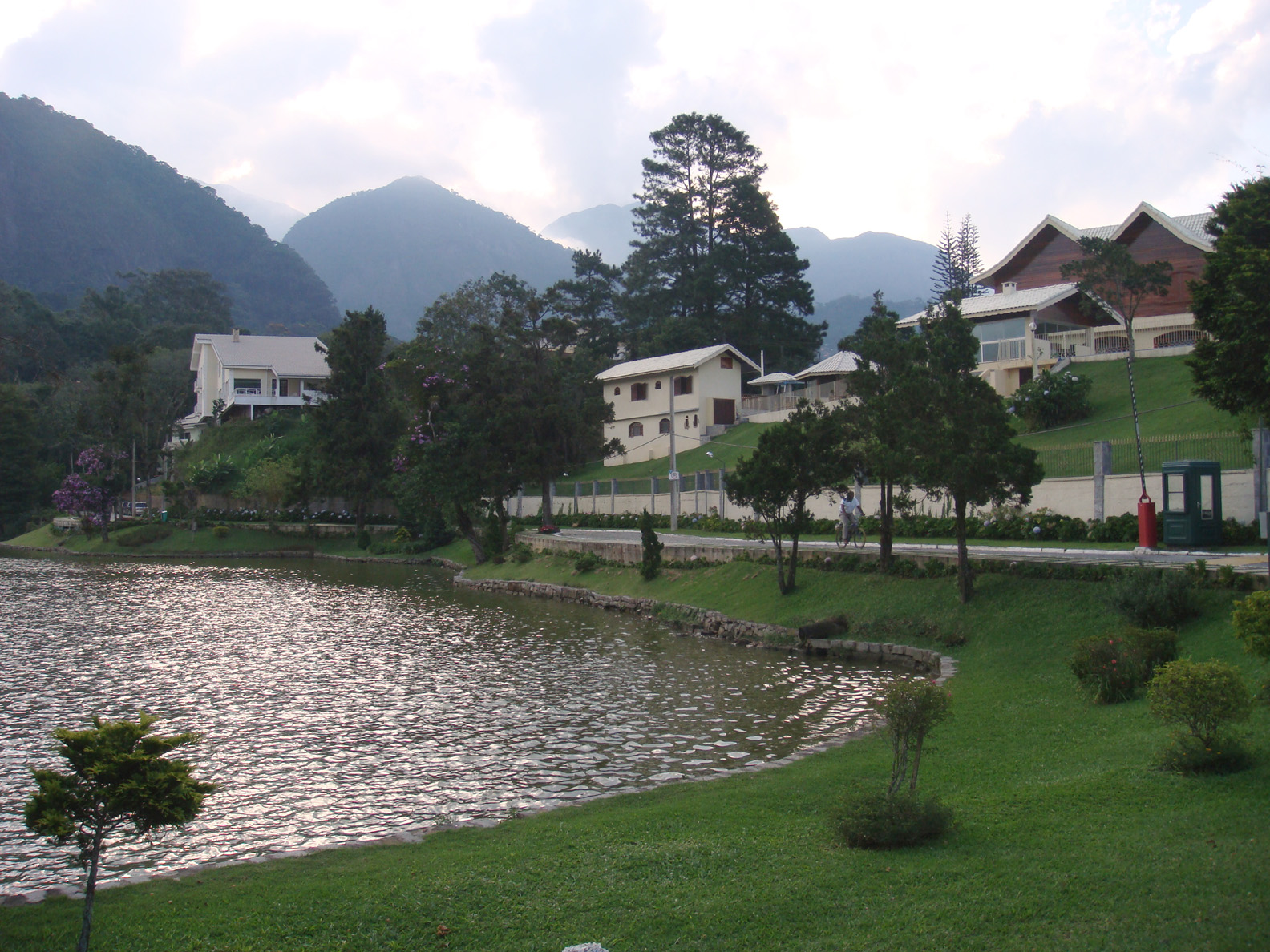
Lake houses

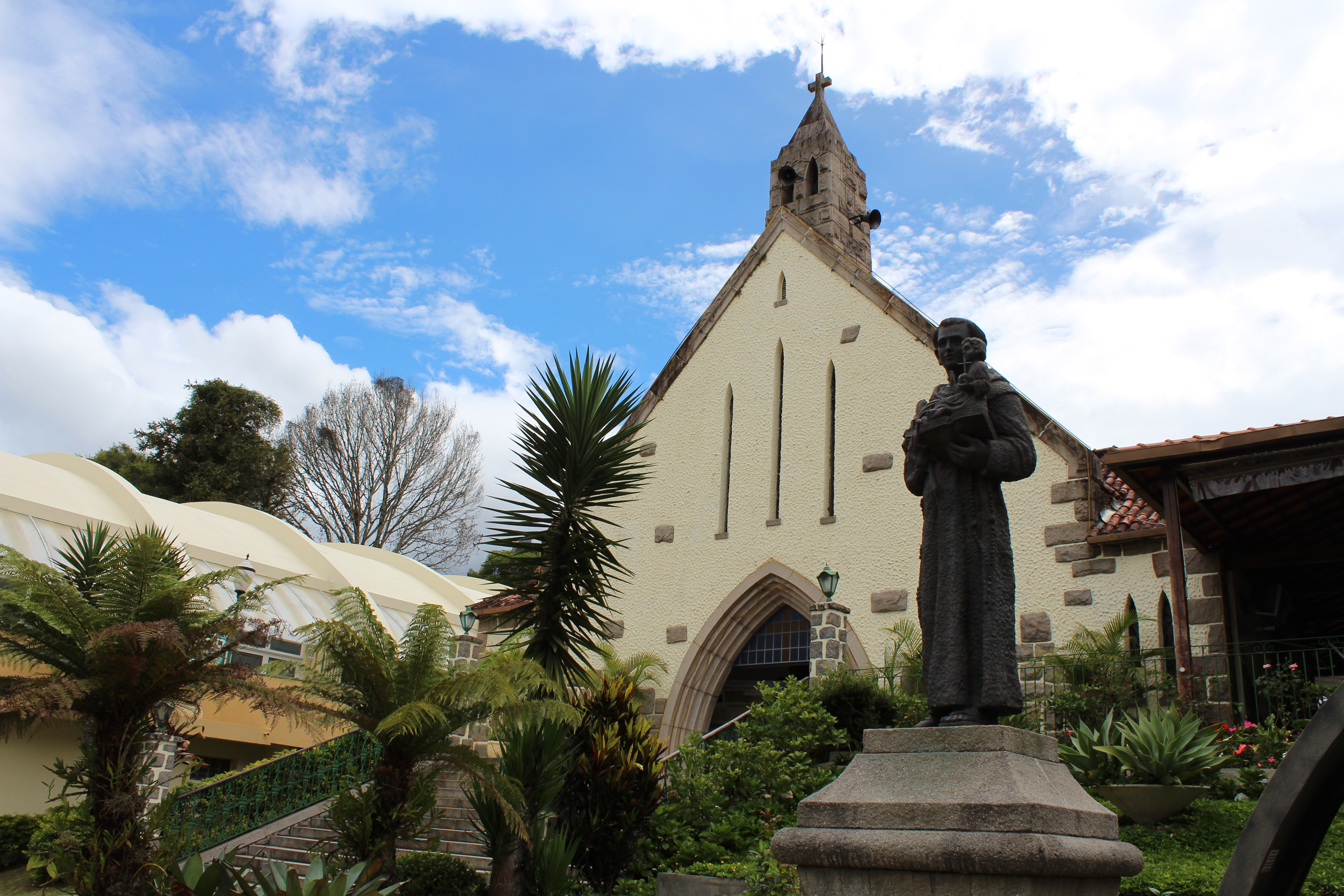
Santo Antônio Church. It is dedicated to Saint Anthony of Padua

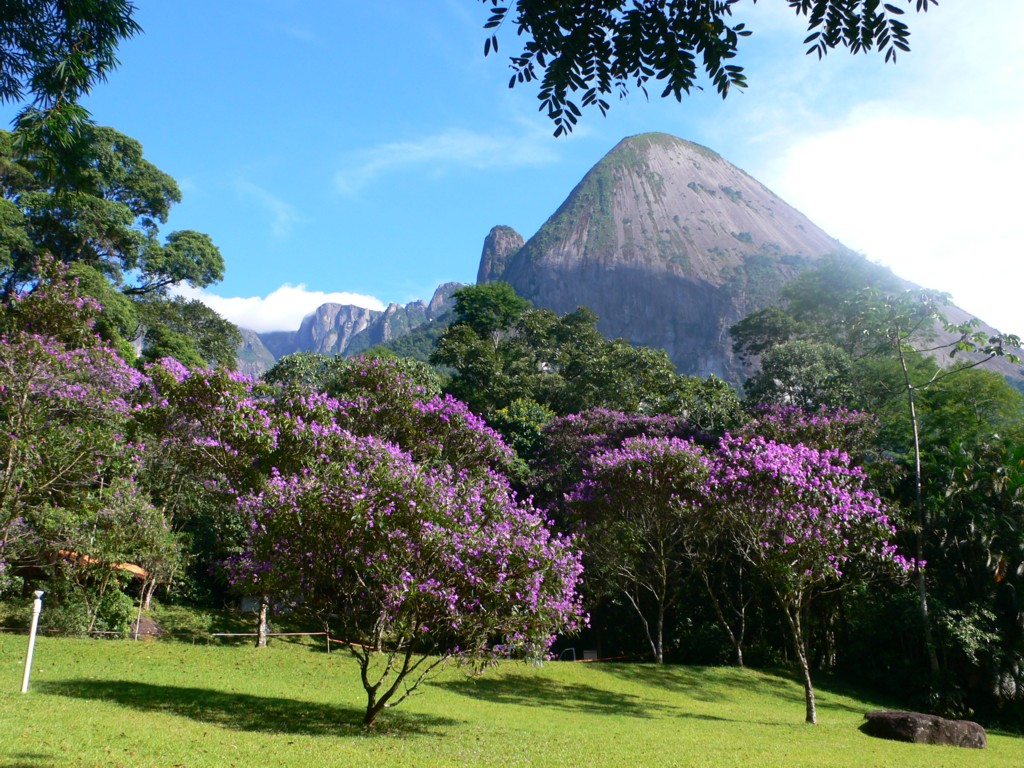
Serra do Mar

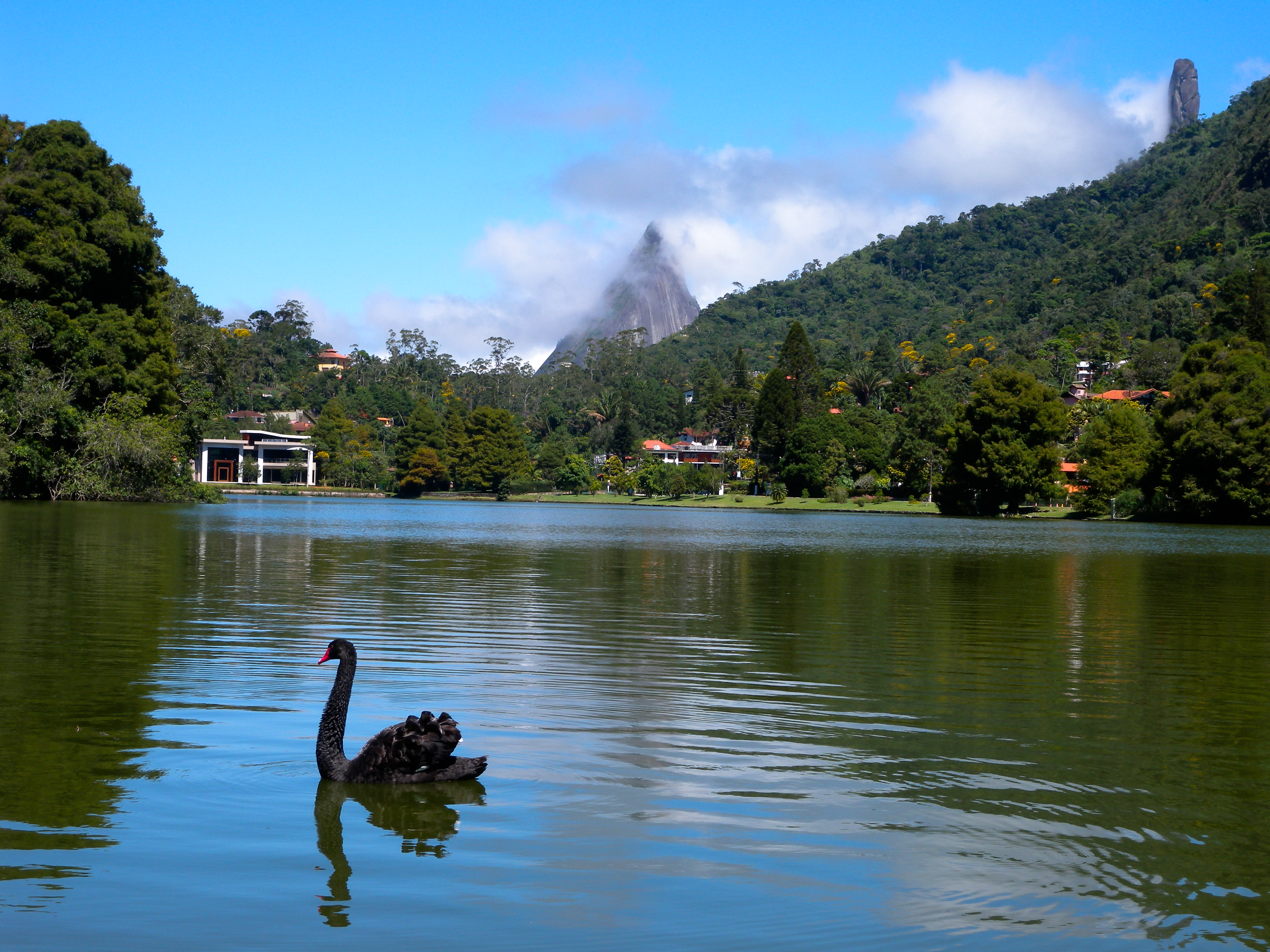
Black swan on Lake Comary

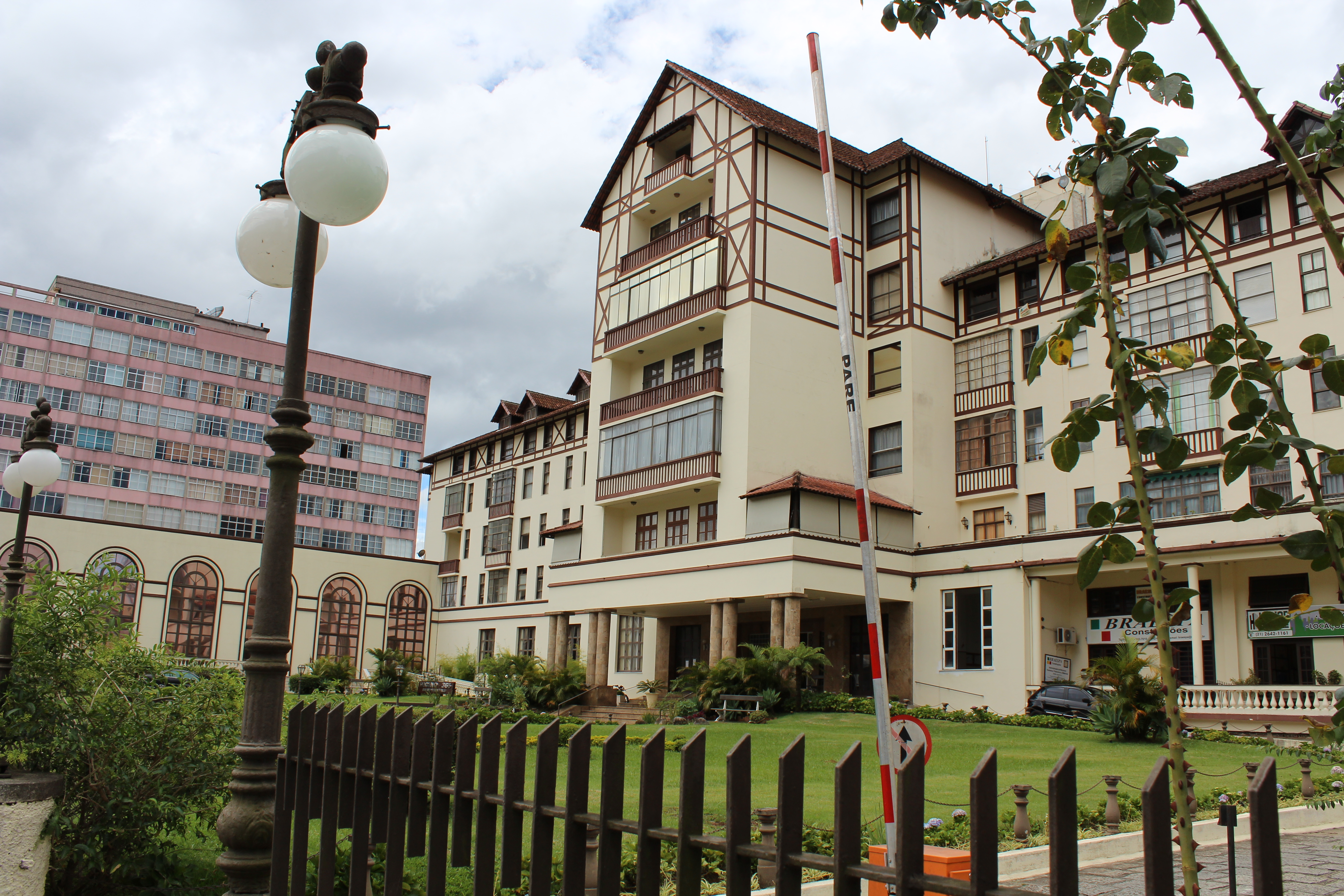
Higino Hotel

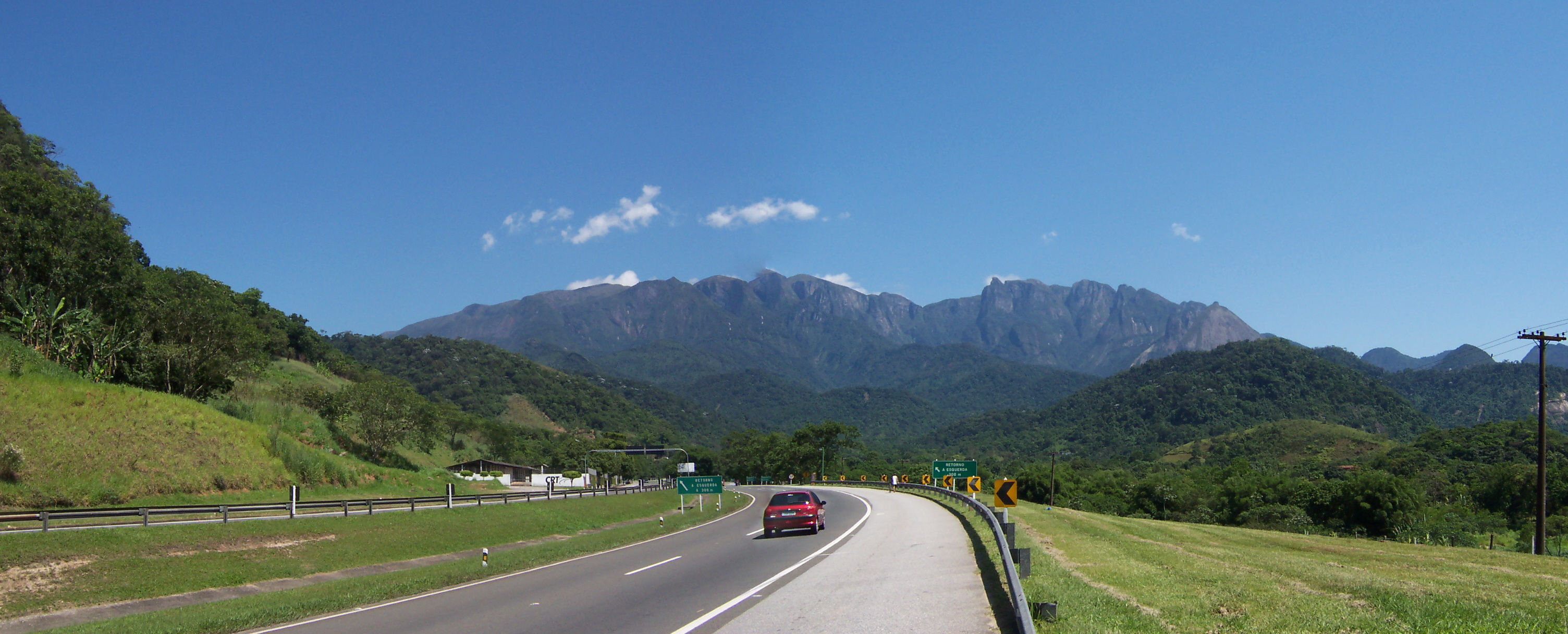
Rio-Teresópolis highway (stretch of BR-116) connecting Greater Rio de Janeiro to Teresópolis

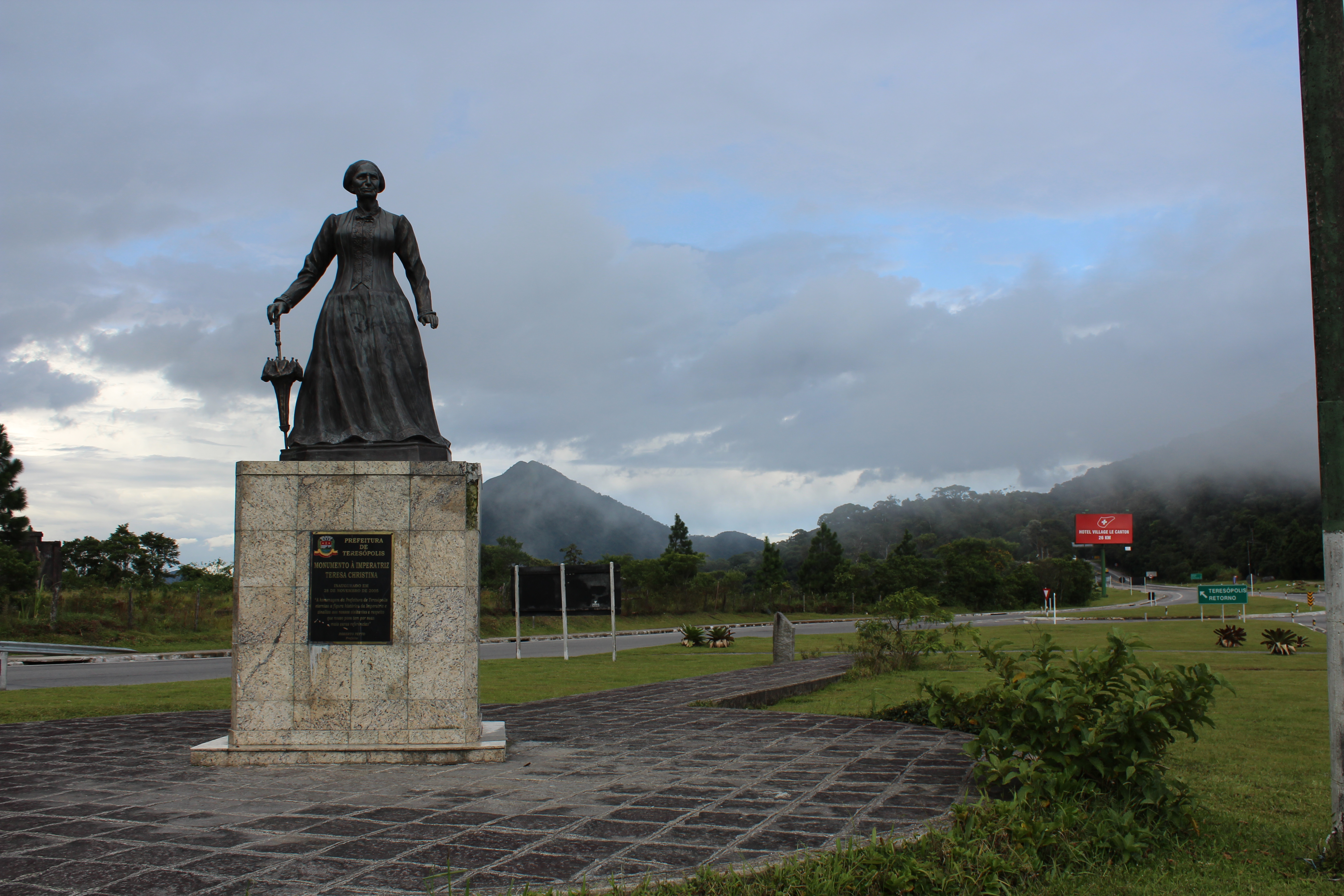
Empress Teresa Cristina statue at the entrance of the municipality. Teresópolis was named in her honor.

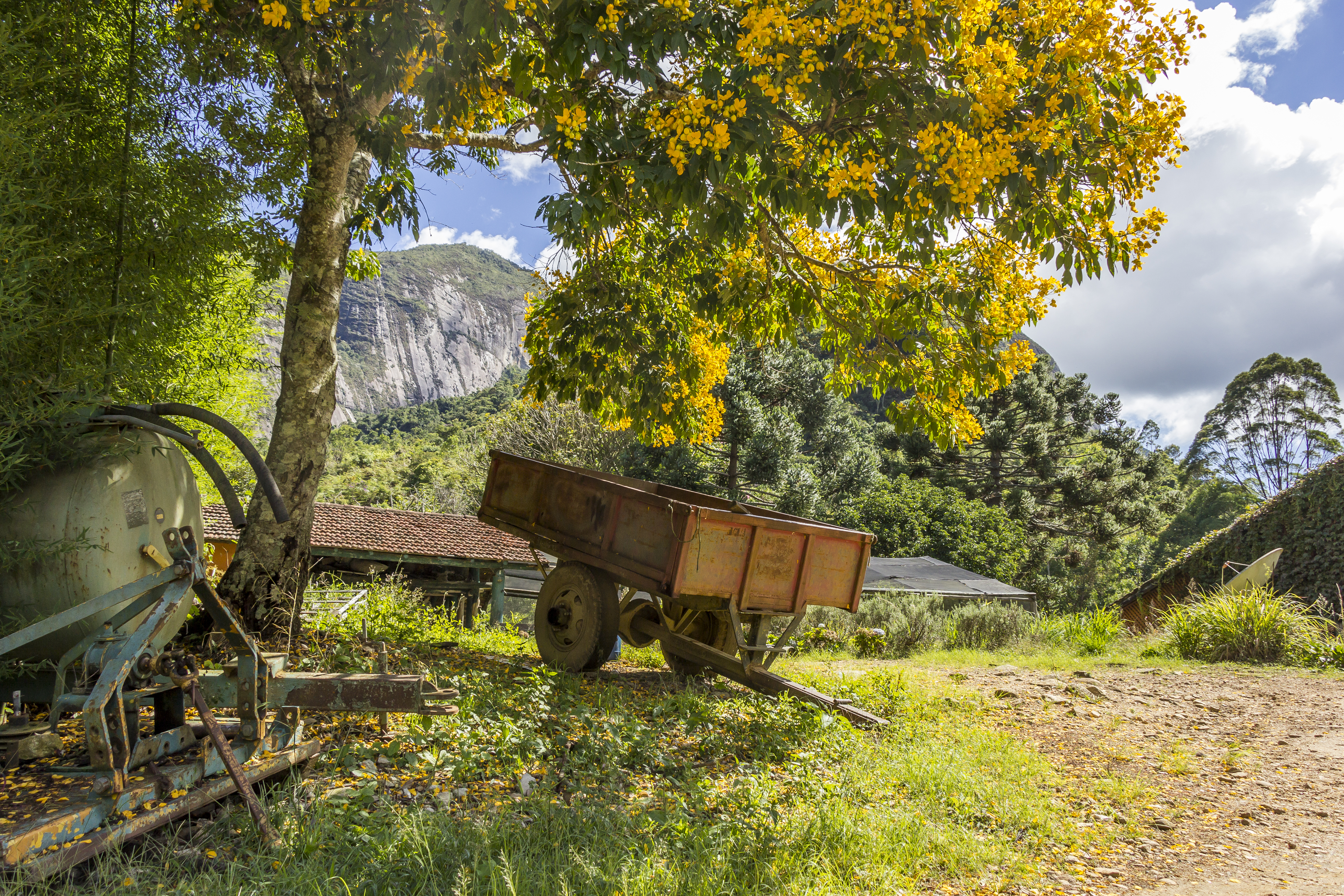
A farm in the rural area of Teresópolis

== Sister cities ==
Teresópolis' sister cities are:

- (Brazil) Rio de Janeiro
