= Petropolis (disambiguation) =

Petropolis may refer to:

== Places ==
- Petrópolis, Rio de Janeiro, Brazil; a town about 65 km from the city of Rio de Janeiro.
  - Petrópolis Municipal Nature Park
  - Roman Catholic Diocese of Petrópolis
    - Cathedral of Petrópolis
    - Catholic University of Petrópolis
  - Petrópolis Medical School
- Petrópolis Environmental Protection Area, Rio de Janeiro, Brazil
- Petropolis Railway, in the state of Rio de Janeiro, Brazil, see List of rack railways
- Petrópolis, Rio Grande do Sul, Brazil; a neighbourhood in the city of Porto Alegre
- Petropolis, the Greek and Latin name for the previous capital of Russia, Saint Petersburg.

Fictional places

- Petropolis, the fictional setting of the Nickelodeon cartoon, T.U.F.F. Puppy.

== Entertainment ==
- Petrópolis (film), 2022 Russian film
- Petropolis: Aerial Perspectives on the Alberta Tar Sands, a film made by Peter Mettler and Greenpeace about Alberta's tar sands
- "Petropolis", a 1983 song by Steve Hackett off the album Bay of Kings
- Petropolis, a 2007 novel by Anya Ulinich

== Other uses ==
- Grupo Petrópolis, a Brazilian brewery
- Treaty of Petrópolis (1903), ending the war between Brazil and Bolivia
- Petrópolis, a futsal club in Petrópolis, Rio de Janeiro, Brazil; see List of futsal clubs in Brazil
- Petrópolis line of the House of Orléans-Braganza, in the Brazilian imperial family
- SS Petropolis (1856), sister ship of the screw steamer SS Teutonia (1856)

== See also ==
- 2022 Petrópolis floods, a natural disaster that occurred in Petrópolis, Brazil
- Nova Petrópolis, a municipality in Rio Grande do Sul, Brazil
