= Taquara Municipal Nature Park =

Municipal nature park in Rio de Janeiro, Brazil

- Parque Natural Municipal da Taquara
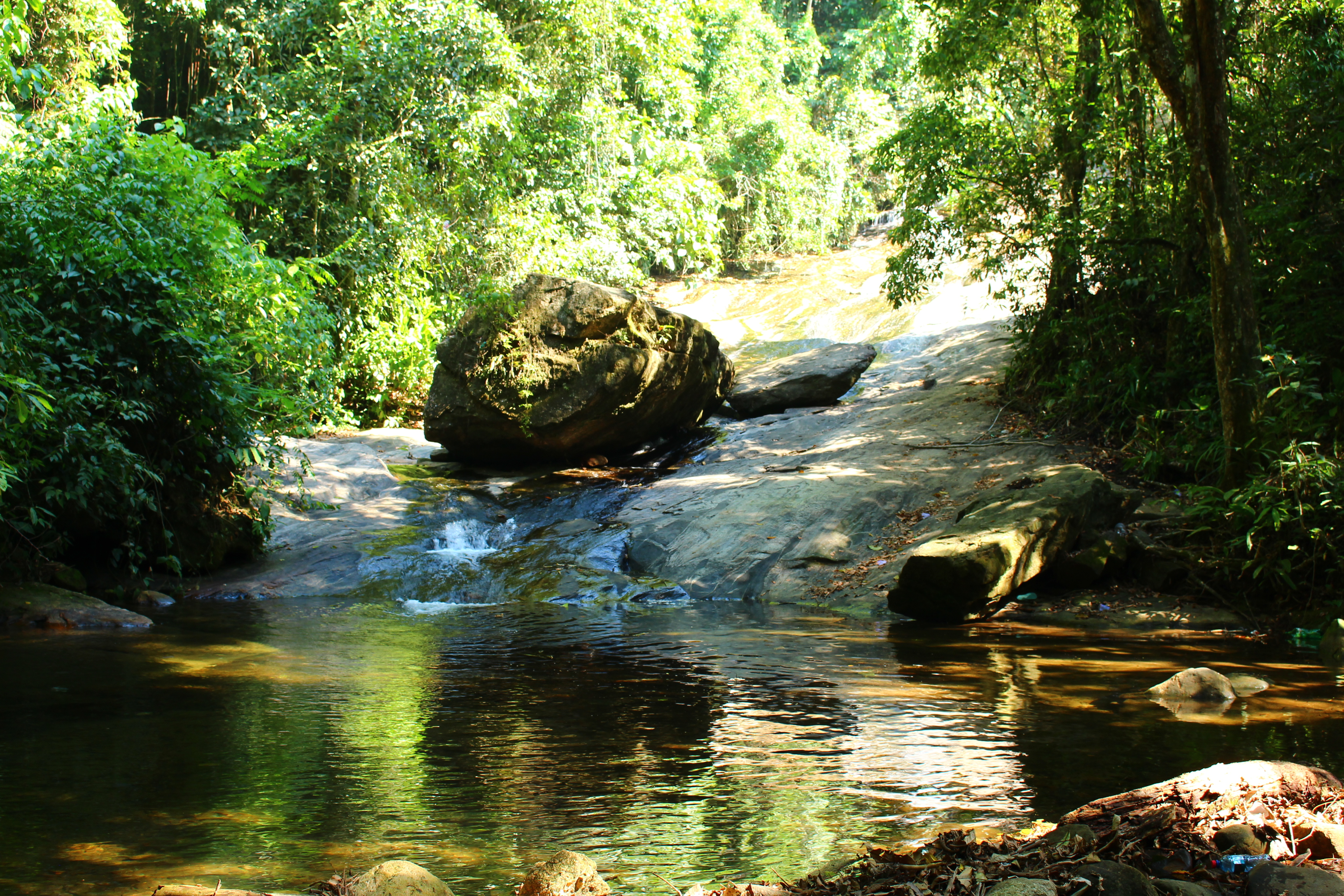
- Stream in the park

- Location within Brazil
- Nearest city: Duque de Caxias, Rio de Janeiro
- Coordinates: 22°36′58″S 43°14′20″W
- Area: 19.4 hectares (48 acres)
- Designation: Municipal nature park
- Created: 11 December 1992

The Taquara Municipal Nature Park (Portuguese: Parque Natural Municipal da Taquara) is a municipal nature park in the state of Rio de Janeiro, Brazil. It protects an area of Atlantic Forest.

== Location ==
The Taquara Municipal Nature Park is in the municipality of Duque de Caxias, Rio de Janeiro The park has an area of 19.4 hectares (48 acres). It is at the foot of the Serra de Petrópolis. It is in the Serra dos Órgãos between the Petrópolis Environmental Protection Area and the Tinguá Biological Reserve. There is good infrastructure for visitors, including trails that lead past the Taquara River and the Cachoeira das Dores (Waterfall of Sorrows).

The park contains a remnant of Atlantic Forest. The golden lion tamarin was sighted by experts in 2006, several years after it had been declared extinct in the region. The park is home to birds including Brazilian tanager (Ramphocelus bresilius), true thrush (Turdus species) and blue-gray tanager (Thraupis episcopus), and mammals such as coati, sloth, armadillo and many apes.

== Visitors ==
The park supports the Guarda Florestal Mirim program, which gives environmental education to children. The park is visited by up to 4,000 people monthly, especially in summer. Of the visitors, 54% only had primary education, which may affect receptiveness to typical environmental education programs. Most of the visitors are young people, 81% male, from Taquara and its neighborhoods. The most common reason for visiting is to swim in the river or the waterfall.

== History ==
The Taquara Municipal Nature Park was created by municipal law 1157 of 11 December 1992 to preserve the natural beauty of Caxias. The park was included in the Central Rio de Janeiro Atlantic Forest Mosaic, created in December 2006.

== Sources ==
- Costa, Cláudia; Lamas, Ivana; Fernandes, Rosan (December 2010), Planejamento Estratégico do Mosaico Central Fluminense (PDF) (in Portuguese), Reserva da Biosfera da Mata Atlântica, archived from the original (PDF) on 2016-10-07
- "Parque Municipal da Taquara", mapa de cultura (in Portuguese), Secretaria de Estado de Cultura RJ, archived from the original on 2016-10-06
- Parque Natural Municipal da Taquara (in Portuguese), Duque de Caxias Municipality, archived from the original on 2016-08-09
- Takio Kitagawa, Alexandre; Carvalho da Costa, Malena; Mello de Lima, Lucas Julião; Gonçalves Kitagawa, Mônica; Aguiar, Hernani; Oliveira Lula Salles, Rodrigo de; Santos Silva, Nathália Carina dos (2013), "Perfil dos visitantes do Parque Natural Mmunicipal da Taquara, Duque de Caxias, RJ" (PDF), Uso Público em Unidades de Conservação (in Portuguese), 1 (1), Niterói – RJ
