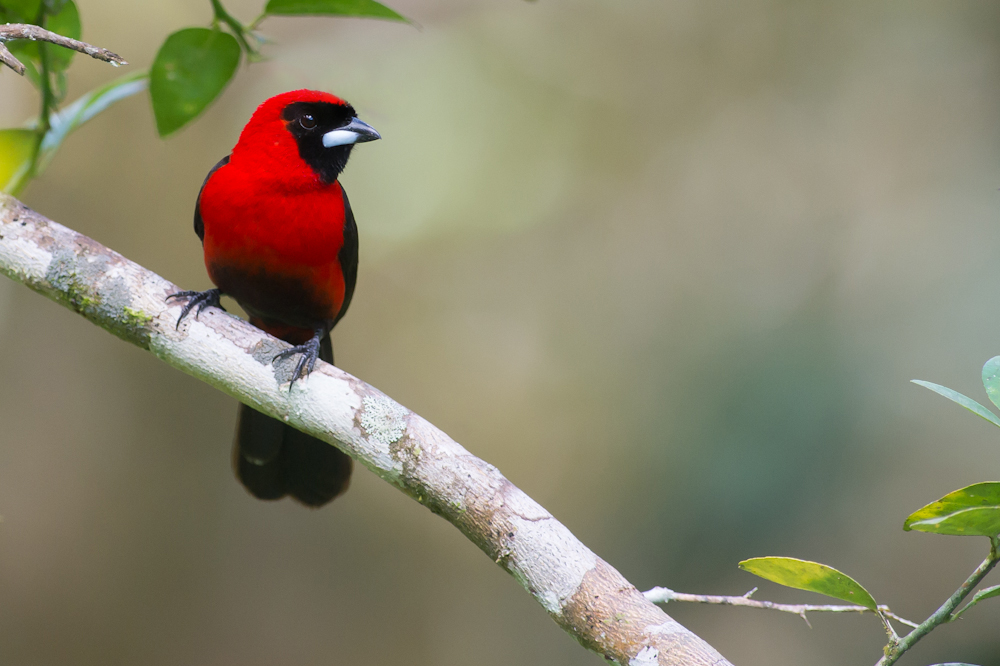

Conservation status
- Least Concern (IUCN 3.1)

Scientific classification
- Kingdom: Animalia
- Phylum: Chordata
- Class: Aves
- Order: Passeriformes
- Family: Thraupidae
- Genus: Ramphocelus
- Species: R. nigrogularis

Binomial name
- Ramphocelus nigrogularis (Spix, 1825)

Synonyms
- Tanagra nigrogularis Spix; Tanagra (Ramphopsis) ignescens Less.; Ramphocelus ignescens Lafr.

= Masked crimson tanager =

Species of bird

The masked crimson tanager (Ramphocelus nigrogularis) is a species of bird in the family Thraupidae, the tanagers and allies. It is found in Brazil, Colombia, Ecuador, Peru, and possibly Bolivia.

== Taxonomy and systematics ==
The masked crimson tanager was formally described by German naturalist Johann Baptist von Spix in 1825 with the binomial Tanagra nigrogularis. It is now one of eight species of brightly colored tanagers in the genus Ramphocelus. Mitochondrial DNA evidence indicates its closest relative is the crimson-backed tanager (R. dimidiatus), and the two split around 800,000 years ago. Its specific epithet is derived from the Latin words niger "black", and gularis "throated".

The masked crimson tanager is monotypic.

== Description ==
The masked crimson tanager is about 17 cm (6.7 in) long and weighs 27 to 36 g (0.95 to 1.3 oz). It has a heavy bill with a wide base to the mandible. The species is sexually dimorphic though not dramatically so. Adult males have a black mask from the base of the forehead and the lower throat to past the eye. The rest of their head and neck and most of their body are shiny red. Their mantle, longer uppertail coverts, wings, and tail are jet-black. The center of their breast and belly and their thighs are also black. Their rear flanks and undertail coverts usually have some black mixed in the red. Adult females have a similar pattern to males but are usually duller overall and their breast and belly patch are dusky rather than black. Both sexes have a reddish brown iris, a black maxilla, a white mandible with a black tip, and dark horn-gray legs. Immature birds resemble adults but are brick red and dusky instead of bright red and black.

== Distribution and habitat ==
The masked crimson tanager is a bird of the western and central Amazon Basin. It is found from the Bogotá area of Colombia south and southeast to the east of the Andes to Ecuador and Peru. There are also small isolated populations in Guaviare and Guainía departments. From Colombia its range continues south through eastern Ecuador and eastern Peru. It might also continue into Bolivia but the South American Classification Committee has only unconfirmed records in that country. From extreme southeastern Colombia and eastern Peru its range continues east into Brazil mostly south of the Amazon almost to its mouth in northeastern Pará.

The masked crimson tanager inhabits várzea forest, brushy areas, secondary forest, and other vegetative communities along oxbow lakes and rivers. It sometimes is found a short distance from water in brushy forest clearings. In elevation it ranges up to 500 m (1,600 ft) in Colombia, to 600 m (2,000 ft) in Ecuador, and to 600 m (2,000 ft) and locally to 1,100 m (3,600 ft) in Peru.

== Behavior ==
=== Movement ===
The masked crimson tanager is a year-round resident.

=== Feeding ===
The masked crimson tanager feeds on arthropods and fruits. It typically forages in groups of as many as 12 individuals that usually include both adults and young or first-year birds. The groups are described as "ebullient [and] flashy...enlivening the scene wherever they go". The groups sometimes forage with silver-beaked tanagers (R. carbo) or as part of a mixed-species feeding flock but more often away from them. It usually forages up to the forest's mid-level but occasionally as high as 25 m (80 ft) or more above the ground. It takes most arthropods from foliage. At a feeding station in Peru the species was dominant over silver-beaked tanagers.

=== Breeding ===
The masked crimson tanager's breeding season has not been defined but includes July in Ecuador and August in Peru. Its nest is a cup made from plant fibers with a lining of thinner fibers. One clutch had two eggs that were bluish with a few heavy black markings. The incubation period, time to fledging, and details of parental care are not known. However, there is some evidence of cooperative breeding by the species.

=== Vocalization ===
The masked crimson tanger's song is "a deliberate series of simple notes" chup whip weehur...chup whip weehur..." and its calls "a high, squeaky tip and a metallic tink".

== Status ==
The IUCN has assessed the masked crimson tanager as being of Least Concern. It has a very large range; its population size is not known but is believed to be stable. No immediate threats have been identified. It is considered "locally common" in Colombia, "fairly common and widespread" in Peru, and "common to frequent" in Brazil. It is found in several protected areas and its range "also encompasses vast areas of intact habitat that is not formally protected and is at extremely low risk".

== Gallery ==
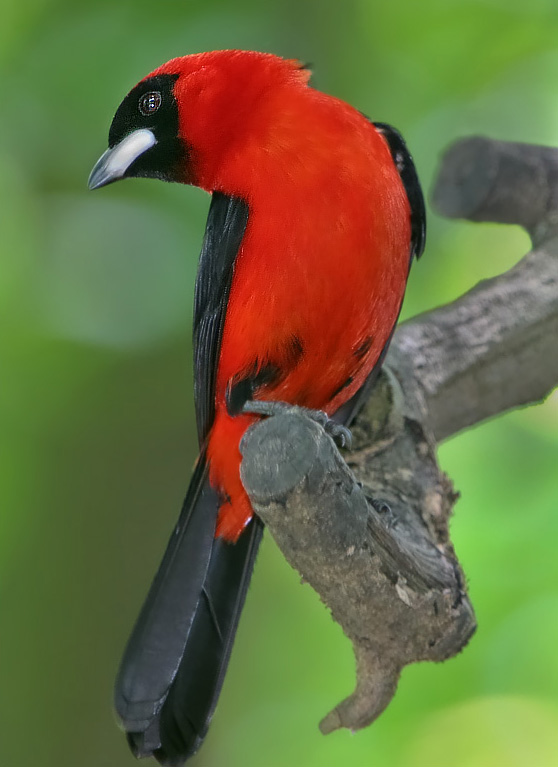

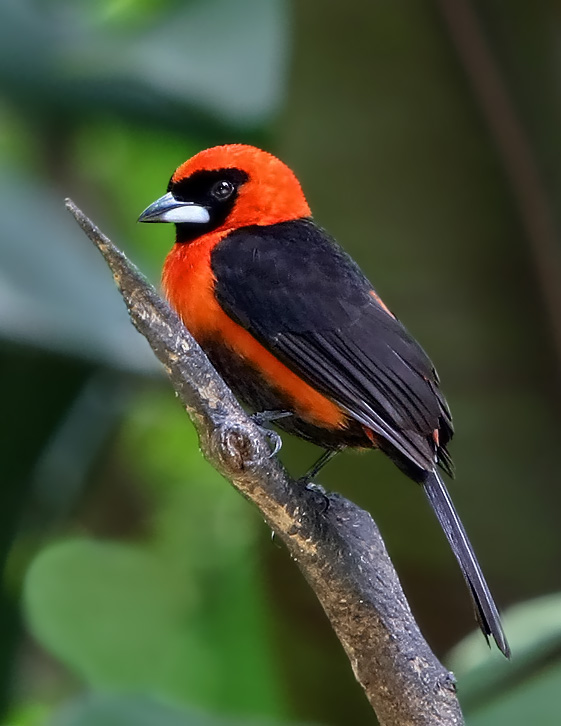
