= Astrothelium quasimamillanum =

Scientific classification
- Kingdom: Fungi
- Division: Ascomycota
- Class: Dothideomycetes
- Order: Trypetheliales
- Family: Trypetheliaceae
- Genus: Astrothelium
- Species: A. quasimamillanum

Binomial name
- Astrothelium quasimamillanum Aptroot & C.O.Mendonça (2019)

Species of lichen

Astrothelium quasimamillanum is a species of corticolous (bark-dwelling) lichen in the family Trypetheliaceae. Found in Brazil, it was formally described as a new species in 2019 by lichenologists André Aptroot and Cléverton de Oliveira Mendonça. The type specimen was collected by Mendonça from the Municipal nature park (Porto Velho, Rondônia) at an altitude of 100 m (330 ft). The lichen has a smooth and shiny, dark brown thallus that is surrounded by a dark brown prothallus and covers areas up to 7 cm (3 in) in diameter. It has pear-shaped (pyriform) ascomata, measuring 0.6–0.9 mm in diameter, which mostly occur either immersed in the bark, or as barely discernible black structures under the thallus cortex. The ascospores are hyaline, ellipsoid in shape, and muriform (i.e., divided into multiple chambers by 1–2 vertical and 10–12 transverse septa), with dimensions of 30–33 by 9.5–10.5 μm. The specific epithet quasimamillanum alludes to its slight similarities with members of the Pyrenula mamillana species group.
