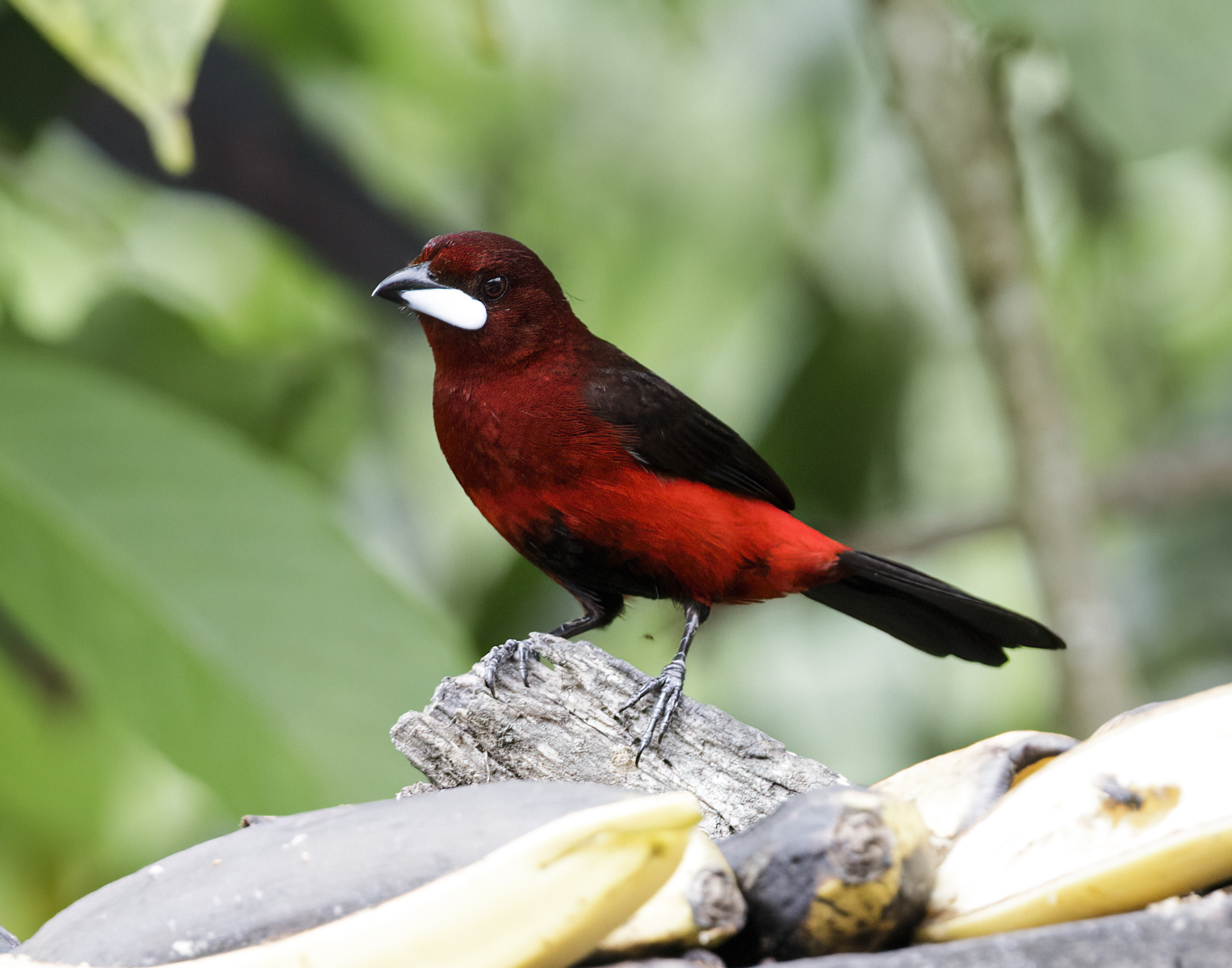

Conservation status
- Least Concern (IUCN 3.1)

Scientific classification
- Kingdom: Animalia
- Phylum: Chordata
- Class: Aves
- Order: Passeriformes
- Family: Thraupidae
- Genus: Ramphocelus
- Species: R. melanogaster

Binomial name
- Ramphocelus melanogaster (Swainson, 1838)

= Huallaga tanager =

Species of bird

The Huallaga tanager (Ramphocelus melanogaster) or black-bellied tanager is a species of bird in the family Thraupidae, the tanagers and allies. It is endemic to Peru.

== Taxonomy and systematics ==
The Huallaga tanager was formally described in 1838 with the binomial Rhamphopis melanogaster. By 1929 it had been reassigned to its present genus Ramphocelus. (Note: That year Zimmer described subspecies Ramphocelus melanogaster transitus so the "parent" had been moved by that time.)

The Huallaga tanager has two subspecies, the nominate R. m. melanogaster (Swainson, 1838) and R. m. transitus (Zimmer, JT, 1929).

== Description ==
The Huallaga tanager is 16 to 18 cm (6.3 to 7.1 in) long; one male weighed 25 g (0.88 oz). It has a heavy bill with a wide base to the mandible. The species is sexually dimorphic though not dramatically so. Adult males of the nominate subspecies have a dark red or reddish brown head, breast, and upper back. The rest of their of their back is black and their rump and undertail coverts bright red. Their wings and tail are black. The center of their belly is black and the rest of their underparts below the breast bright red. Adult females have a similar pattern to males but are usually duller overall and have no black. Their head is reddish brown with often a paler red area around the bill. Their back, throat, upper breast, wings, and tail are reddish brown and their rump and uppertail coverts redder. Their lower breast, belly, and undertail coverts are cinnamon-red with no black center. Subspecies R. m. transitus is similar to the nominate. However, males have a redder center to their back and a paler throat and breast with less contrast with the lower breast. Both sexes of both subspecies have a reddish brown iris, dusky gray legs, and a dusky maxilla. Males have a silvery white mandible with a black tip and females a bluish gray mandible.

== Distribution and habitat ==
The Huallaga tanager is restricted to the valleys of the Mayo and Huallaga rivers, mostly in San Martín and Huánuco departments of north-central Peru. In elevation it ranges between 500 and 1,800 m (1,600 and 5,900 ft). The nominate subspecies is the more northerly; it is found from the Mayo valley south to the central Huallaga valley. Subspecies R. m. transitus is found in the upper Huallaga valley. The species primarily inhabits secondary forest. It occurs in lesser numbers on the edges of lowland evergreen forest, forest along rivers, and in scrublands.

== Behavior ==
=== Movement ===
The Huallaga tanager is a year-round resident.

=== Feeding ===
The Huallaga tanager's diet and foraging behavior have not been studied but they are believed to be similar to those of the silver-beaked tanager (R. carbo), which see here.

=== Breeding ===
Nothing is known about the Huallaga tanager's breeding biology but it is believed to be similar to that of the silver-beaked tanager, which see here.

=== Vocalization ===
The Huallaga tanager's voice is "[p]robably indistinguishable from Silver-beaked". Its song is described as "a moderately high pitched series of Chew-ee-chew, Chew-ee notes" and it call "a single high pitched chip".

== Status ==
The IUCN has assessed the Huallaga tanager as being of Least Concern. Its population size is not known but is believed to be stable. No immediate threats have been identified. It is considered common in its limited range.
