= Calçado River (Rio de Janeiro) =

- Location within Brazil
- Native name: Rio Calçado (Portuguese)

Location
- Country: Brazil

Physical characteristics
- Source
  - location: Rio de Janeiro state
- Mouth
  - location: Três Rios, Rio de Janeiro
  - coordinates: 22.094908°S 43.076252°W

Basin features
- River system: Paraíba do Sul

The Calçado River (Portuguese: Rio Calçado) is a river of Rio de Janeiro state in southeastern Brazil, South America. It is a tributary of the Paraíba do Sul.

In its upper reaches the Calçado River forms the boundary of the Pedra das Flores Natural Monument in the municipality of São José do Vale do Rio Preto.

== See also ==
- List of rivers of Rio de Janeiro
