= Maravilha Environmental Protection Area =

Protected area in Rio de Janeiro, Brazil

- Área de Proteção Ambiental Maravilha
- IUCN category V (protected landscape/seascape)
- Location within Brazil
- Nearest city: São José do Vale do Rio Preto, Rio de Janeiro
- Coordinates: 22°10′21″S 42°54′25″W
- Area: 13,223.4 hectares (32,676 acres)
- Designation: Environmental protection area
- Created: 5 June 2006
- Administrator: Secretaria Municipal de Meio Ambiente de São José do Vale do Rio Preto

The Maravilha Environmental Protection Area (Portuguese: Área de Proteção Ambiental Maravilha) is a municipal environmental protection area in the state of Rio de Janeiro, Brazil.

== Location ==
The Maravilha Environmental Protection Area (APA) is in the municipality of São José do Vale do Rio Preto, Rio de Janeiro. It has an area of 13,223.4 hectares (32,676 acres). The Serra da Maravilha is one of the main conservation areas in the municipality along with the Serra do Taquaruçu (Araponga Municipal Nature Park) and Pedra das Flores Natural Monument. A dam located in the APA is the main source of water for the town. The APA contains a water treatment station.

The Maravilha APA contains alpine meadows and secondary growth forest, surrounded by agricultural land and pastures. Some of the agricultural activities are irregular, and the farmers extract firewood from the APA improperly. The APA includes large farms and conventional horticulture, and is poorly managed.

== History ==
The Maravilha Environmental Protection Area was created by municipal decree 1.652 of 5 June 2006. It is administered by the Secretaria Municipal de Meio Ambiente. The purpose is to ensure the conservation and sustainable use of natural resources. It was included in the Central Rio de Janeiro Atlantic Forest Mosaic, created in December 2006. As of 2010 there was no management plan. The drought in 2014 caused low water in the dam, leading to supply of water from contaminated streams in the region. This in turn created health problems, particularly with children.

== Sources ==
- Chaves, Rosana; Dias, Rafael de Souza; Silva, Elaine Cristina (4–8 May 2015), "A questão da água em São José do Vvale do Rio Preto: Gestão pública x fatores ambientais" (PDF), 4º Simpósio de Gestão Ambiental e Biodiversidade (4º SIGABI) (in Portuguese), Três Rios – RJ
- Costa, Cláudia; Lamas, Ivana; Fernandes, Rosan (December 2010), Planejamento Estratégico do Mosaico Central Fluminense (PDF) (in Portuguese), Reserva da Biosfera da Mata Atlântica, archived from the original (PDF) on 2016-10-07
- Coutinho, Bruno; Freitas, Leonardo (2010), Projeto Mosaicos do Corredor da Serra do Mar (IA-RBMA / CEPF) Justificativa de Criação (PDF) (in Portuguese), RBMA
- "São José do Vale do Rio Preto possui cinco Unidades de Conservação", Conexão Verde (in Portuguese), 1 (1), November 2009
- São José do Vale do Rio Preto – RJ (in Portuguese), Trilheiro
- Zonas do Mosaico Central Fluminense (PDF) (in Portuguese), cbuc, 2011
