= Pedra das Flores Natural Monument =

Protected area in Rio de Janeiro, Brazil

- Location within Brazil
- Nearest city: São José do Vale do Rio Preto, Rio de Janeiro
- Coordinates: 22°09′46″S 42°52′30″W
- Area: 346 hectares (850 acres)
- Designation: Natural monument
- Created: 2005
- Administrator: Secretaria Municipal do Meio Ambiente

The Pedra das Flores Natural Monument is a municipal natural monument in the state of Rio de Janeiro, Brazil.

== Location ==
The Pedra das Flores Natural Monument is in the municipality of São José do Vale do Rio Preto, Rio de Janeiro. It has an area of about 346 hectares (850 acres). It is in the Serra do Capim. It is one of the main conservation areas in the municipality along with the Serra do Taquaruçu (Araponga Municipal Nature Park) and Serra da Maravilha (Maravilha Environmental Protection Area). The monument has vegetation of alpine meadows, rich in bromeliads and orchids.

== History ==
The Pedra das Flores Natural Monument was created by municipal decree 1.651 of 2005. That year the conservation unit was swept by a fire started by a farmer on pasture beside the site. It was included in the Central Rio de Janeiro Atlantic Forest Mosaic, created in December 2006. The monument has suffered from vandalism by people opposed to creating the unit. In 2009 the unit was again partially consumed by a fire that burned all the vegetation from the banks of the Calçado River to the rock wall that leads to the Campo Dois, a favorite location for camping and climbing.

== Sources ==
- Costa, Cláudia; Lamas, Ivana; Fernandes, Rosan (December 2010), Planejamento Estratégico do Mosaico Central Fluminense (PDF) (in Portuguese), Reserva da Biosfera da Mata Atlântica, archived from the original (PDF) on 2016-10-07
- Fabiano Rodrigues de Souza (3 October 2009), Monumento Natural Pedra das Flores sofre com as queimadas (in Portuguese)
- Mosaico de unidades de conservação da Mata Atlântica Central Fluminense - RJ (PDF) (in Portuguese), RBMA
- São José do Vale do Rio Preto – RJ (in Portuguese), Trilheiro
