= Rio Perequê Municipal Nature Park =

Municipal nature park in Paraná, Brazil

- Parque Natural Municipal do Rio Perequê
- Location within Brazil
- Nearest city: Pontal do Paraná, Paraná
- Coordinates: 25°34′26″S 48°21′08″W
- Area: 16.2 hectares (40 acres)
- Designation: Municipal nature park
- Created: 10 September 2001
- Administrator: Secretaria Municipal do Meio Ambiente, Turismo, Agricultura e Pesca de Pontal do Paraná

The Rio Perequê Mangroves Municipal Nature Park (Portuguese: Parque Natural Municipal do Manguezal do Rio Perequê) is a municipal nature park in the state of Paraná, Brazil. It protects an area of mangroves along the Perequê River in the town of Pontal do Sul.

== Location ==
The Rio Perequê Municipal Nature Park is in the municipality of Pontal do Paraná, Paraná. It has an area of 16.2 hectares (40 acres) along the Perequê River. The name is from Tupi-Guarani words that mean "fish entry", referring to the estuary where fish gather to spawn. The park is administered by the Pontal do Paraná Municipal Department of Environment, Tourism, Agriculture and Fisheries, which partners with the Federal University of Paraná's Center for Marine Studies. It is part of the Lagamar Mosaic. The headquarters are on the Avenida Beira-Mar in Pontal do Sul, and are open from 8am to 8pm daily.

== Environment ==
The park protects an area of mangroves, which provides a habitat for birds, crabs and oysters. The Perequê River has a meandering course of about 2.6 kilometres (1.6 mi) and is dominated by the tides. The mangroves cover about 30 hectares (74 acres). The environment has been degraded by disposal of garbage, oil spills from small vessels, abandoned buildings and deforestation. The park supports environmental education. The "micuim" (crab trail) is suspended over the mangrove so that visitors can examine the ecosystem and its characteristics.

== History ==
The Perequê River was used as a port for landing goods that came by sea from Paranaguá and were delivered to Matinhos and Guaratuba by ox cart. The river bed was affected by urban development in the 1950s that followed creation of the Pontal do Sul beach, and the mouth of the river was diverted in 1953. In the late 1970s the course was changed to make way for a road, and in the early 1980s the course was again changed to make way for aquaculture tanks for the UFPR Center for Marine Biology.

A team from what was now the UFPR Center for Marine Studies proposed protection of the area in 1996, and in 1999 the area was made into a municipal Biological Reserve. The Restinga Municipal Nature Park and the Rio Perequê Municipal Nature Park were created by municipal decree 706/01 of 10 September 2001 to protect the restinga and mangrove areas of Pontal do Paraná. The Brazilian Institute of Environment and Renewable Natural Resources (IBAMA) provided about R$195,000 for creation of the Rio Perequê Park. The park boundaries were modified in 2002 due to conflicts over land ownership, removing some of the downstream portion and adding a section further upstream. About 16 hectares (40 acres) was removed from the north, probably due to real estate speculation, and about 8 hectares (20 acres) was added to the south.

The park was inaugurated in December 2003, with a headquarters that provides a space for cultural activities and environmental education. In January 2004 it was showing a photographic exhibition on the environment of Paraná. The management committee was created in 2005, and a new survey was made that established the area of the park as covering the entire area of water and mangroves, even where directly adjoining buildings and streets. The municipality was asked to enact a new law for assignment of use of the area beside the park. In March 2014 it was announced that as part of the Marine Biodiversity Recovery Program a saltwater aquarium would be installed in the park.

== Sources ==
- Manoel, Lawrence (10 January 2004), "Parque do Manguezal é opção de lazer no litoral", Tribuna Parana (in Portuguese)
- Perecin, Gabriela (24 March 2014), REBIMAR monta aquário no Parque Natural Municipal do Manguezal do Rio Perequê (in Portuguese)
- "Pontal Do Paraná", Nosso Litoral do Paraná (in Portuguese)
- Silva, Jose Antonio da (10 September 2001), Decreto no 706/01 (in Portuguese), Municipality of Pontal do Paraná
- Silva, Linus Ghisi Menezes da (2007), Estrutura espacial e variabilidade temporal do manguezal do rio Perequê (Pontal do Sul - Paraná) (PDF) (Monograph), Universidade Federal do Paraná
- Unidades de Conservação - Mosaico do Litoral Sul de São Paulo e do Litoral do Paraná - LAGAMAR (in Portuguese), ICMBio, archived from the original on 2019-05-27
