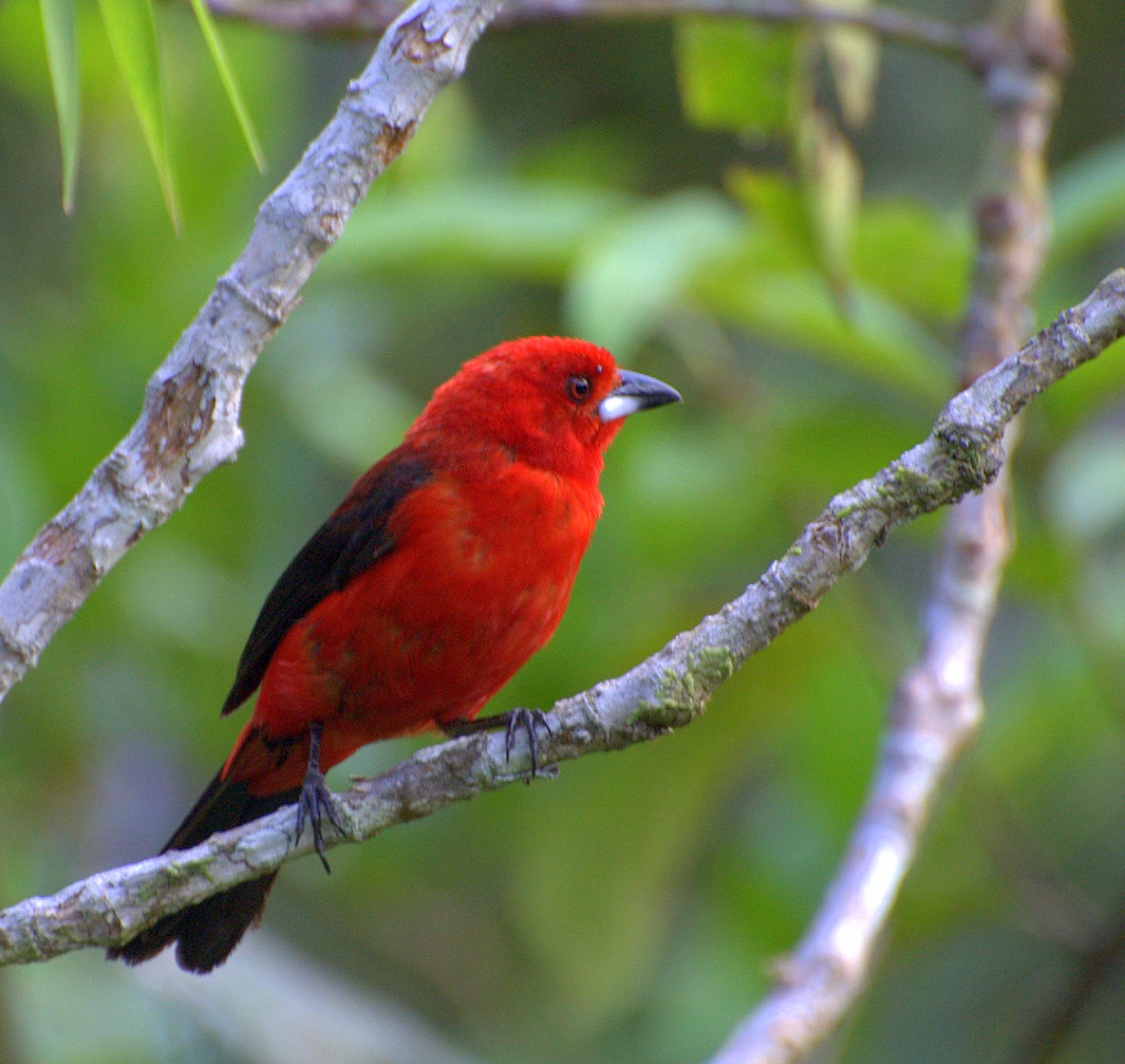
- Brazilian tanager (Ramphocelus bresilius)

Scientific classification
- Kingdom: Animalia
- Phylum: Chordata
- Class: Aves
- Order: Passeriformes
- Family: Thraupidae
- Genus: Ramphocelus; Desmarest, 1805

Type species
- Tanagra bresilia Linnaeus, 1766

Species
- See species list

= Ramphocelus =

Genus of birds

Ramphocelus is a Neotropical genus of birds of the tanager family. They have enlarged shiny whitish or bluish-grey lower mandibles, which are pointed upwards in display. However, this is greatly reduced in the females of most species. Males are black and red, orange or yellow, while females resemble a duller version of the males, or are brownish or greyish combined with dull red, orange or yellowish.

Ramphocelus tanagers are found in semi-open areas. The nest is a cup built by the female of plant materials such as moss, rootlets, and strips of large leaves like banana or Heliconia, and is often in a fairly open site in a tree. The female usually lays pale blue eggs, with grey, brown or lavender spots, and the young stay in the nest for only about 12 days.

The songs of this genus are repetitions of rich one- or two-syllable whistles.

Ramphocelus tanagers hunt at forest edges or in second growth, taking insects in flight or picking them from leaves.

== Taxonomy ==
The genus Ramphocelus was introduced by the French zoologist Anselme Gaëtan Desmarest in 1805. The name combines the Ancient Greek words rhamphos "bill" and koilos "concave". The type species was designated as the Brazilian tanager by the English zoologist George Robert Gray in 1855.

The other species form two superspecies. One includes crimson-backed, Huallaga, silver-beaked and Brazilian tanagers, and the other comprises Passerini's, Cherrie's and flame-rumped tanagers.

The subspecies icteronotus of the flame-rumped tanager is sometimes considered a separate species, and the lemon-rumped tanager, R. icteronotus, and Passerini's and Cherrie's tanager were formerly lumped as scarlet-rumped tanager, R. passerinii (a treatment some authorities still prefer).

== Species ==
The genus contains the following eight species:

Male	Female	Common name	Scientific name	Distribution
		Crimson-collared tanager	Ramphocelus sanguinolentus	
		Flame-rumped tanager	Ramphocelus flammigerus	
		Scarlet-rumped tanager	Ramphocelus passerinii	
		Brazilian tanager	Ramphocelus bresilia	
		Huallaga tanager	Ramphocelus melanogaster	
		Silver-beaked tanager	Ramphocelus carbo	
		Masked crimson tanager	Ramphocelus nigrogularis	
		Crimson-backed tanager	Ramphocelus dimidiatus	

== Sources ==
- ffrench, Richard (1991). A Guide to the Birds of Trinidad and Tobago (2nd ed.). Comstock Publishing. ISBN 0-8014-9792-2.
- Hilty, Birds of Venezuela, ISBN 0-7136-6418-5
- Morton, Isler & Isler, Tanagers ISBN 0-7136-5116-4
- Stiles and Skutch, A guide to the birds of Costa Rica ISBN 0-8014-9600-4
- Steve N. G. Howell and Sophie Webb (1995). A Guide to the Birds of Mexico and Northern Central America. Oxford University Press. ISBN 0-19-854012-4.
- S. J. Hackett (1996). "Molecular phylogenetics and biogeography of tanagers in the genus Ramphocelus (Aves)". Molecular Phylogenetics and Evolution. 5 (2): 368–382. Bibcode:1996MolPE...5..368H. doi:10.1006/mpev.1996.0032. PMID 8728395.
