= Pontal do Paraná =

Coordinates: 25°35′S 48°21′W

- Municipality
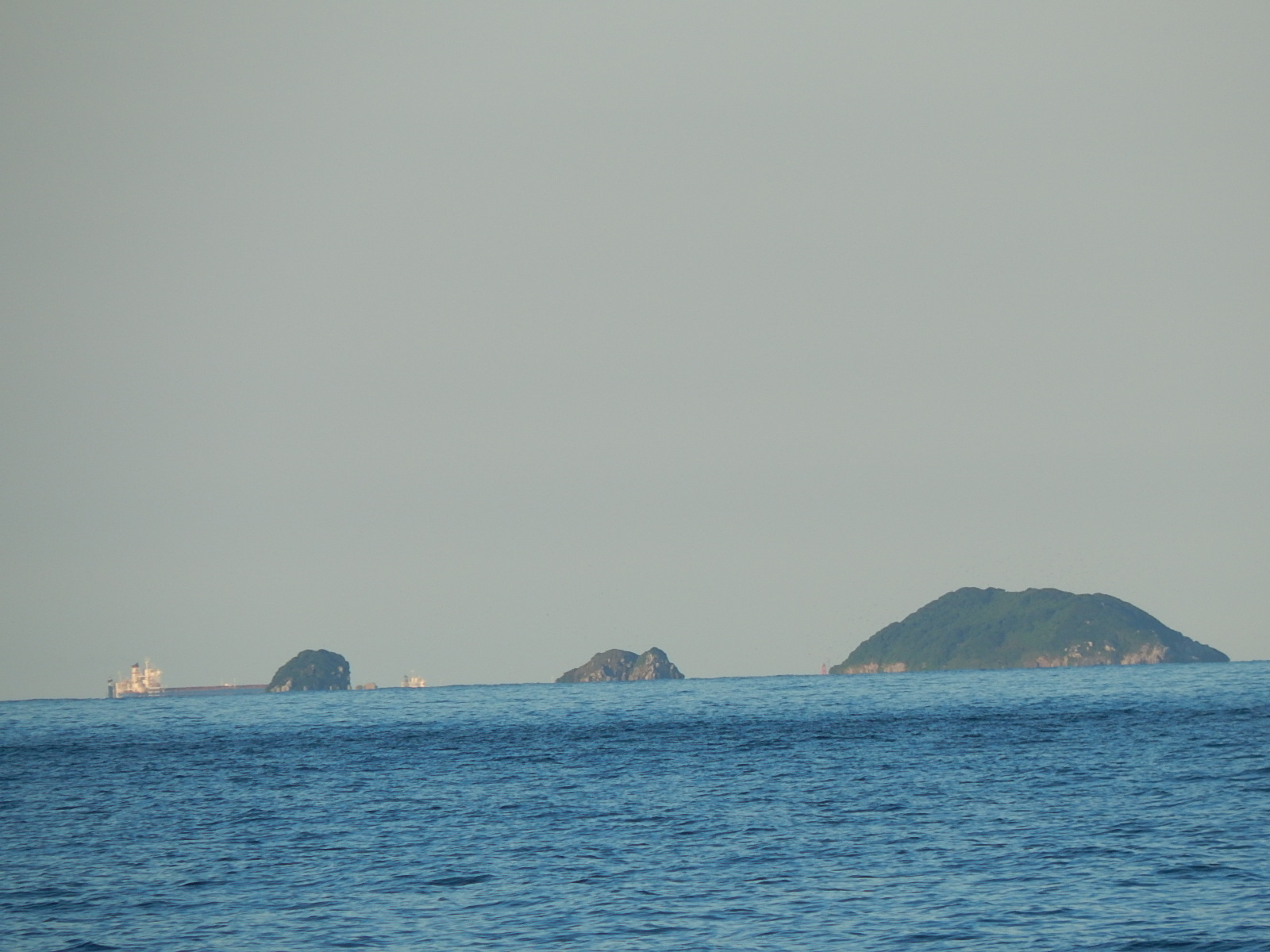
- Ilhas dos Currais

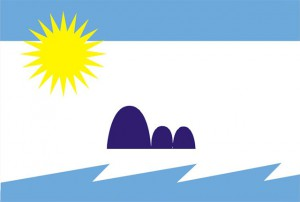
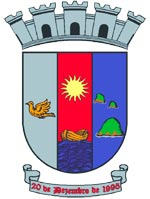
- Flag Coat of arms

- Location in Paraná
- Country: Brazil
- Region: Southern
- State: Paraná
- Mesoregion: Metropolitana de Curitiba
- Emancipated: 20 December 1995
- Installed: 1 January 1997

Government
  - Mayor: Rudisney Gimenes Filho (MDB)
  - Deputy Mayor: Patricia Marcomini (MDB)

Area
  - Total: 78,086 sq mi (202,242 km^{2})

Population (2022)
  - Total: 30,425
  - Density: 0.38963/sq mi (0.15044/km^{2})
- Demonym: Pontalense
- Time zone: UTC−3 (BRT)
- CEP: 83255-000
- Area code: +55 41
- HDI (2010): 0,738 - high
- Website: www.pontaldoparana.pr.gov.br (in Portuguese)

Pontal do Paraná is a municipality in the state of Paraná in the Southern Region of Brazil.

Pontal do Paraná is home to the Center for Marine Studies, Federal University of Paraná. The municipality contains the 16-hectare (40-acre) Rio Perequê Municipal Nature Park, created in 2001 to protect an area of mangroves in Pontal do Sul. It also contains the 407-hectare (1,010-acre) Restinga Municipal Nature Park, created at the same time. The municipality also includes the Ilhas dos Currais Marine National Park, which protects three small islands that provide a nesting ground for marine birds and a refuge and feeding ground for fish.

== See also ==
- List of municipalities in Paraná
