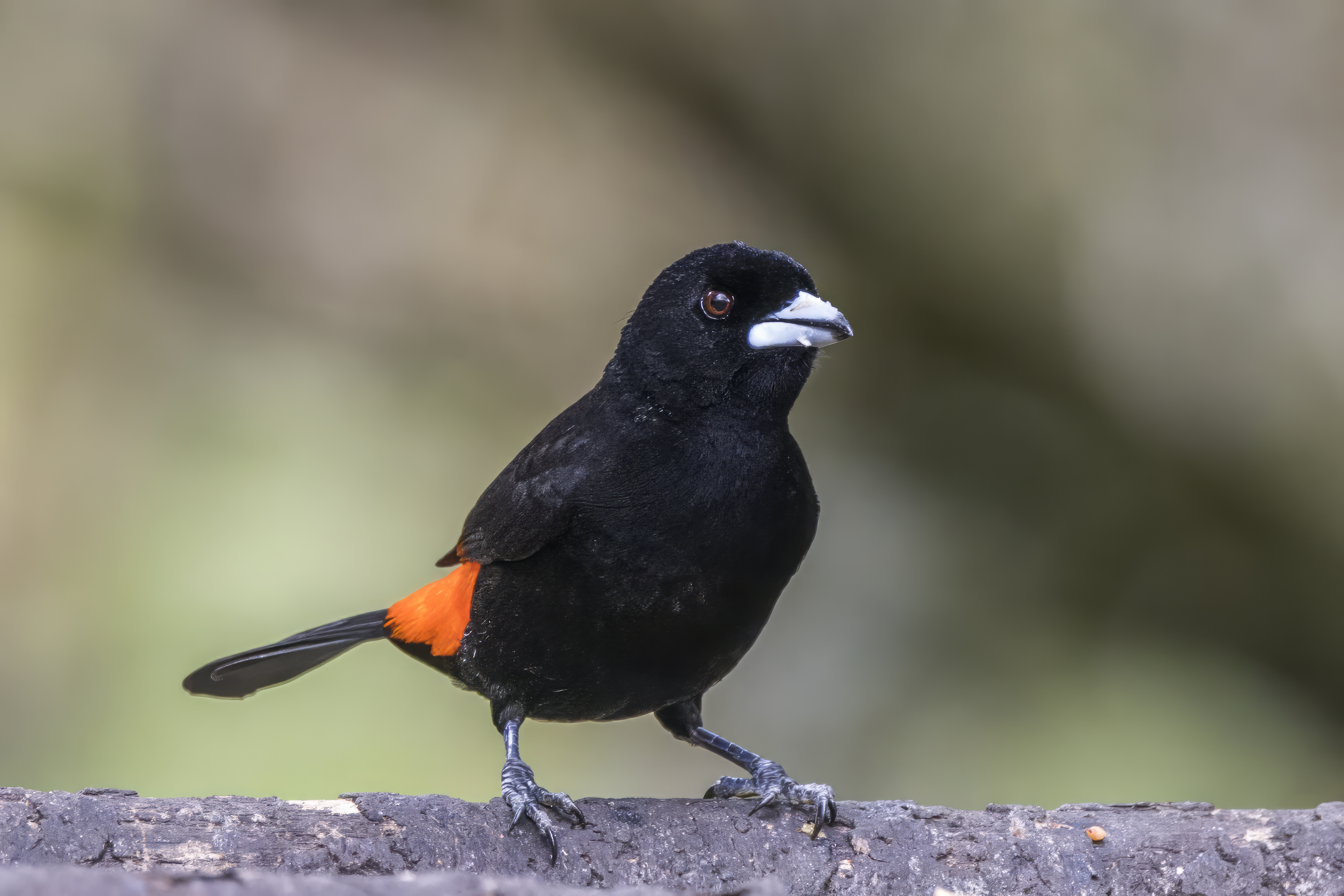
- Male R. f. flammigerus
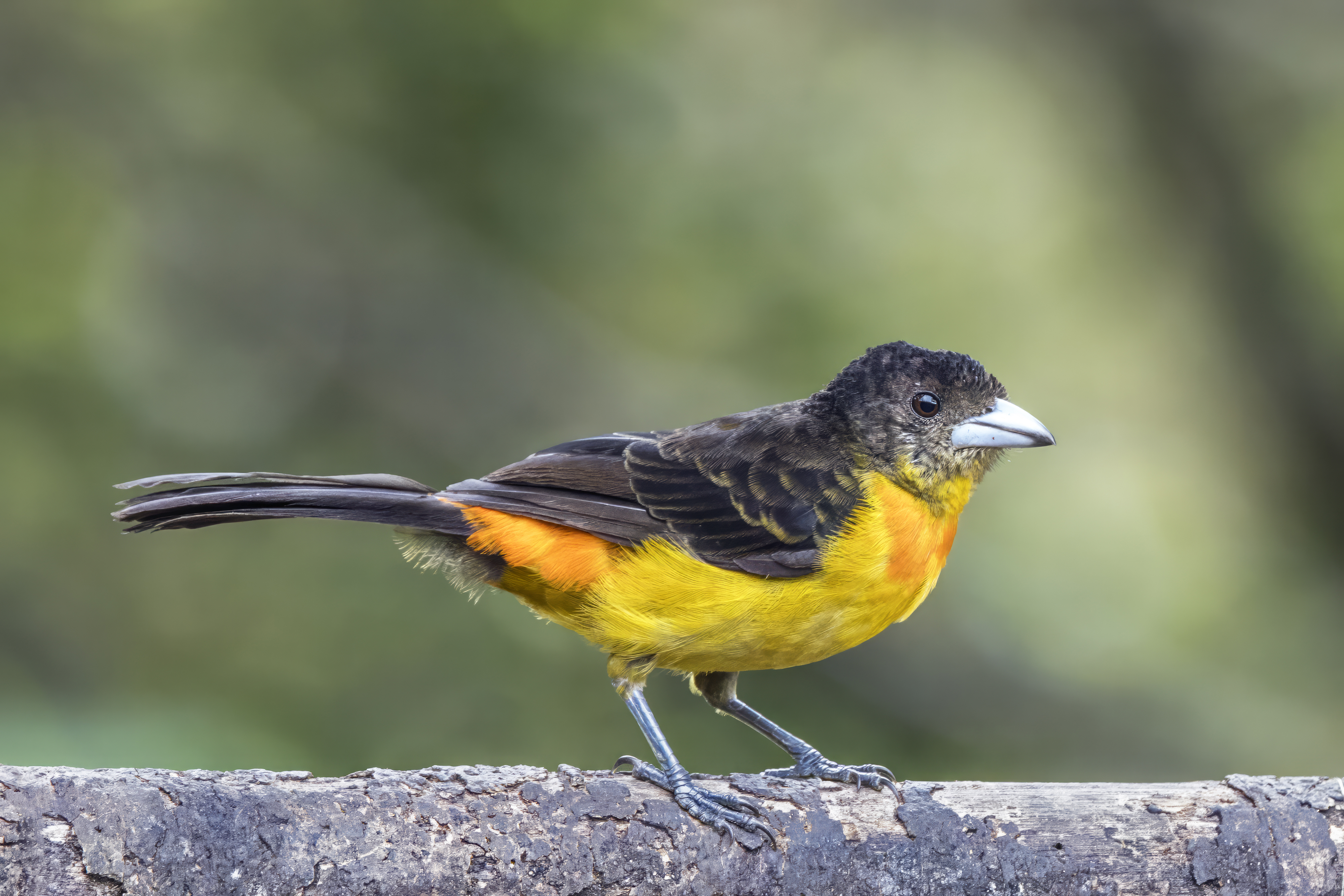
- Female R. f. flammigerus

Conservation status
- Least Concern (IUCN 3.1)]

Scientific classification
- Kingdom: Animalia
- Phylum: Chordata
- Class: Aves
- Order: Passeriformes
- Family: Thraupidae
- Genus: Ramphocelus
- Species: R. flammigerus

Binomial name
- Ramphocelus flammigerus (Jardine & Selby, 1833)

= Flame-rumped tanager =

Species of bird

The flame-rumped tanager (Ramphocelus flammigerus) is a passerine bird in the family Thraupidae, the tanagers and allies. It is found from Panama to Peru. Its two subspecies have at times been treated as full species.

== Taxonomy and systematics ==
The flame-rumped tanager was formally described in 1833 by the English naturalists William Jardine and Prideaux John Selby based on a specimen collected on "some part of the district upon the Columbia River". They assigned the binomial name Ramphopis flamigerus, whose specific epithet is a misspelling of the Latin word flammigerus meaning "flame-bearing" or "fiery". It is now one of eight species in the genus Ramphocelus that was introduced in 1805 by the French zoologist Anselme Gaëtan Desmarest.

The flame-rumped tanager has two subspecies, the nominate R. f. flammigerus (Jardine, W & Selby, PJ, 1833) and R. f. icteronotus (Bonaparte, CLJL, 1838).

For much of the twentieth century subspecies R. f. icteronotus was treated as a separate species, the lemon-rumped tanager. A study published in 2017 found very little genetic differentiation. BirdLife International's Handbook of the Birds of the World lumped the two taxa in 2024. The Clements taxonomy followed suit in 2025 and AviList also adopted the lump that year in its initial version. The IOC adopted the lump in 2026.

== Description ==
The flame-rumped tanager is about 18 cm (7 in) long; subspecies R. f. icteronotus weighs 29.6 to 35.6 g (1.0 to 1.3 oz). The species is sexually dimorphic. Males of the nominate subspecies are almost entirely deep black. Their head is velvety with a plush appearance. Their lower back, rump, and undertail coverts are shiny flame-scarlet. Adult females have a blackish brown to brown head with sometimes some dusky and gray on the face. Their back is also blackish brown and usually has some mottling. Their rump and uppertail coverts are reddish orange. Their throat is dingy grayish yellow, their breast pale yellow with diffuse reddish orange across it, their belly pure pale yellow, and their undertail coverts dull red or a mix of red and yellow. Males of subspecies R. f. icteronotus are shiny lemon-yellow where the nominate is scarlet. Females have a grayish brown head and back, sometimes with an olive tinge on the latter. Their lower back, rump, and uppertail coverts are pale yellow. Their throat is dull whitish that becomes pale yellow on the rest of the underparts. Both sexes of both subspecies have a crimson to dark maroon iris, a light blue-gray bill with a black tip, and dark horn-gray legs. Immature males of both subspecies resemble adult females.

== Distribution and habitat ==
Subspecies R. f. icteronotus has by far the larger range of the two. It is found in Panama on the Caribbean slope from Bocas del Toro Province east to Veraguas Province and then across the width of the rest of the country into northwestern Colombia. In Colombia it is found from the northern base of the Western Andes east across the lower valleys of the Cauca and Magdalena rivers and south on the western slope of the Eastern Andes into Santander Department. Its range also continues along the western slope of the Western Andes into Ecuador. In Ecuador it is found from the Pacific to the Andean foothills south to Santa Elena Province and then only in the foothills south through El Oro and Loja provinces. From Ecuador it continues very slightly into extreme northwestern Peru's Tumbes Department.

The nominate subspecies R. f. flammigerus has a relatively restricted range in Colombia. There it is found primarily in the Cauca River valley from central Antioquia Department south to Cauca Department. The river separates the Western and Central Andes and the bird is found along both slopes. Its range also includes the western slope of the Eastern Andes above the Magdalena River in Santander. The two subspecies hybridize where their ranges overlap.

The flame-rumped tanager inhabits "Tropical Lowland Evergreen Forest Edge, Secondary Forest, [and] Second-growth Scrub" [capitals in original]. Both subspecies also occur in pastures, plantations, and shrubby gardens in human-settled areas. In elevation subspecies R. f. flammigerus ranges between 800 and 2,000 m (2,600 and 6,600 ft). Subspecies R. f. icteronotus ranges from sea level to 1,500 m (4,900 ft) in Colombia and to 1,600 m (5,200 ft) in Ecuador.

== Behavior ==
=== Movement ===
The flame-rumped tanager is generally a year-round resident though some poorly documented, apparently seasonal, movements have been noted in Panama and Colombia.

=== Feeding ===
Both subspecies of the flame-rumped tanager feed on fruit and arthropods. The widespread subspecies R. f. icteronotus forages in pairs, family groups, and in larger groups that may number six or more individuals. The groups are noisy, spending "most of the time in fussing and calling from thickets and shrubbery or in visiting small fruiting shrubs and trees". It takes berries while perched. It takes about half of its insect prey in mid-air with sallies from a perch and picks the rest from foliage and grass. Subspecies R. f. flammigerus is seen mostly singly and in pairs and less often in family groups, and it apparently does not form the larger noisy groups that icteronotus does; otherwise their feeding techniques are essentially the same.

=== Breeding ===
The breeding seasons of the flame-rumped tanager's two subspecies have not been fully defined. That of subspecies R. f. flammigerus includes February and July. One of its nests was an open cup built in low weeds. Its eggs are pale blue with dark spots. Nothing else is known about the subspecies' breeding biology. R. f. icteronotus breeds between February and mid-May in Panama and December to May in Colombia. Its season in Ecuador includes March. Its nest is a cup made from leaves and plant fibers and often has lichen on the outside. The usual clutch is two eggs though three are known. They are blue or greenish blue with dark markings. In captivity only the female incubates, for 11 to 14 days, and fledging occurs 12 to 14 days after hatch. Both parents provision nestlings.

=== Vocalization ===
The two subspecies' vocalizations are similar. Males sing at dawn from atop a bush or sapling, "an energetic series of mostly 2-note or 3-note phrases repeated over and over" (flammigerus) or "an energetic and somewhat musical tseee-yah repeated tirelessly" (icteronotus). The species' most common call is "a loud, slightly nasal chink".

== Status ==
The IUCN first assessed the flame-rumped tanager as the lumped species in 2023 and determined it is of Least Concern. It has a very large range; its population size is not known but is believed to be increasing. No immediate threats have been identified. It is considered "frequent to uncommon" in Panama, "common and conspicuous" in Ecuador, and "rare " in Peru. Subspecies R. f. flammigerus is "locally common" and R. f. flammigerus is "common" in Colombia. It is found in a few protected areas.
