= Cachoeira da Fumaça e Jacuba Natural Park =

Nature Park in Rio de Janeiro, Brazil

- Parque Natural Municipal da Cachoeira da Fumaça e Jacuba
- Location within Brazil
- Nearest city: Resende, Rio de Janeiro
- Coordinates: 22.257815°S 44.333121°W
- Area: 363 hectares (900 acres)
- Designation: Municipal nature park
- Created: 28 December 1988
- Administrator: Agência do Meio Ambiente do Município de Resende

The Cachoeira da Fumaça e Jacuba Natural Park (Portuguese: Parque Natural Municipal da Cachoeira da Fumaça e Jacuba) is a municipal nature park in the state of Rio de Janeiro, Brazil.

== Location ==
The Cachoeira da Fumaça e Jacuba Natural Park is located in the municipality of Resende, Rio de Janeiro. It covers an area of 363 hectares (900 acres). The vegetation is mainly dense rainforest.

The main attraction is the Preto River's Cachoeira da Fumaça (Smoke Falls) on the border between Rio de Janeiro and Minas Gerais. The Cachoeira da Fumaça is the largest waterfall in the state of Rio de Janeiro, 2 kilometres (1.2 mi) long, with a 200 metres (660 ft) drop. The falls were listed as Cultural Heritage and Landscape of Resende by Municipal Decree 043 of 1999. It is 6 kilometres (3.7 mi) from the rural town of Jacuba on the bank of the Rio Preto.

== History ==
The Cachoeira da Fumaça e Jacuba Natural Park was created by decree 197 of 28 December 1988. The park was included in the Mantiqueira Mosaic, created on 11 December 2006. It was re-categorized by decree 3177 of 30 April 2009. The park is managed by the municipal environmental agency.

== Sources ==
- Jacuba (in Portuguese), Prefeitura de Resende, archived from the original on 2016-10-02
- José Rechuan Junior (30 April 2009), O parque municipal da Fumaça (in Portuguese)
- Parque Natural Municipal da Cachoeira da Fumaça e Jacuba (PDF) (in Portuguese), Mantiqueira Mosaic
- Portaria no- 351, de 11 de Dezembro de 2006 (in Portuguese), MMA
