= Restinga Municipal Nature Park =

Protected coastal vegetation park in Paraná, Brazil

- Parque Natural Municipal da Restinga
- Location within Brazil
- Nearest city: Pontal do Paraná, Paraná
- Coordinates: 25.579506°S 48.351475°W
- Area: 394.55 hectares (975.0 acres)
- Designation: Municipal nature park
- Created: 10 September 2001

The Restinga Municipal Nature Park (Portuguese: Parque Natural Municipal da Restinga) is a municipal nature park in the state of Paraná, Brazil. It was created to protect a strip of coastal vegetation, but little has been done to implement the park.

== Location ==
The Restinga Municipal Nature Park extends along the coast of the municipality of Pontal do Paraná. It consists of the land between the beach and the coastal avenue. As of 2004, the park's area was 394.55 hectares (975.0 acres). The park is part of the Lagamar Mosaic.

== History ==
The concept of making the restinga area of the municipality a protected area was proposed in 1999 and decreed in 2001. The Restinga Municipal Nature Park and the Rio Perequê Municipal Nature Park were created by municipal decree 706/01 of 10 September 2001 to protect the restinga and mangrove areas of Pontal do Paraná, with an area of 407.5 hectares (1,007 acres). Its limits were modified by another decree, and as of 2004 the area was 394.55 hectares (975.0 acres).

== Status ==
As of 2004, there was no environmental plan, usage guidelines, infrastructure or supervision. Parts of the park are well-preserved and natural, while others are environmentally degraded or converted for use in recreation and leisure. The location of the park on the seafront has value in terms of conserving the environment and protecting against erosion, but conflicts with the use of the area by the local population. Activities that are incompatible with the status of the park, which in theory is fully protected, include clearing and burning vegetation, levelling of the land, the introduction of exotic plants, making and expanding roads across the park to access the beach, and construction of sports courts and parking lots.

== Sources ==
- Kotler, Liliane (2004), Diagnóstico e propostas de manejo para o Parque Natural Municipal da Restinga - Pontal do Paraná - PR (PDF) (monograph) (in Portuguese), Pontal do Paraná
- Lopes, Alberto; Carmona, Kátia; Voivodic, Ricardo, Plano de Intervenção na Orla Marítima de Pontal do Paraná (PDF) (in Portuguese), Projeto de Gestão Integrada da Orla Marítima
- Silva, Jose Antonio da (10 September 2001), Decreto no 706/01 (in Portuguese), Municipality of Pontal do Paraná
- Unidades de Conservação - Mosaico do Litoral Sul de São Paulo e do Litoral do Paraná - LAGAMAR (in Portuguese), ICMBio, archived from the original on 2019-05-27
