= Petrópolis Municipal Nature Park =

Park in Petrópolis, Rio de Janeiro, Brazil

- Parque Natural Municipal de Petrópolis
- IUCN category II (national park)
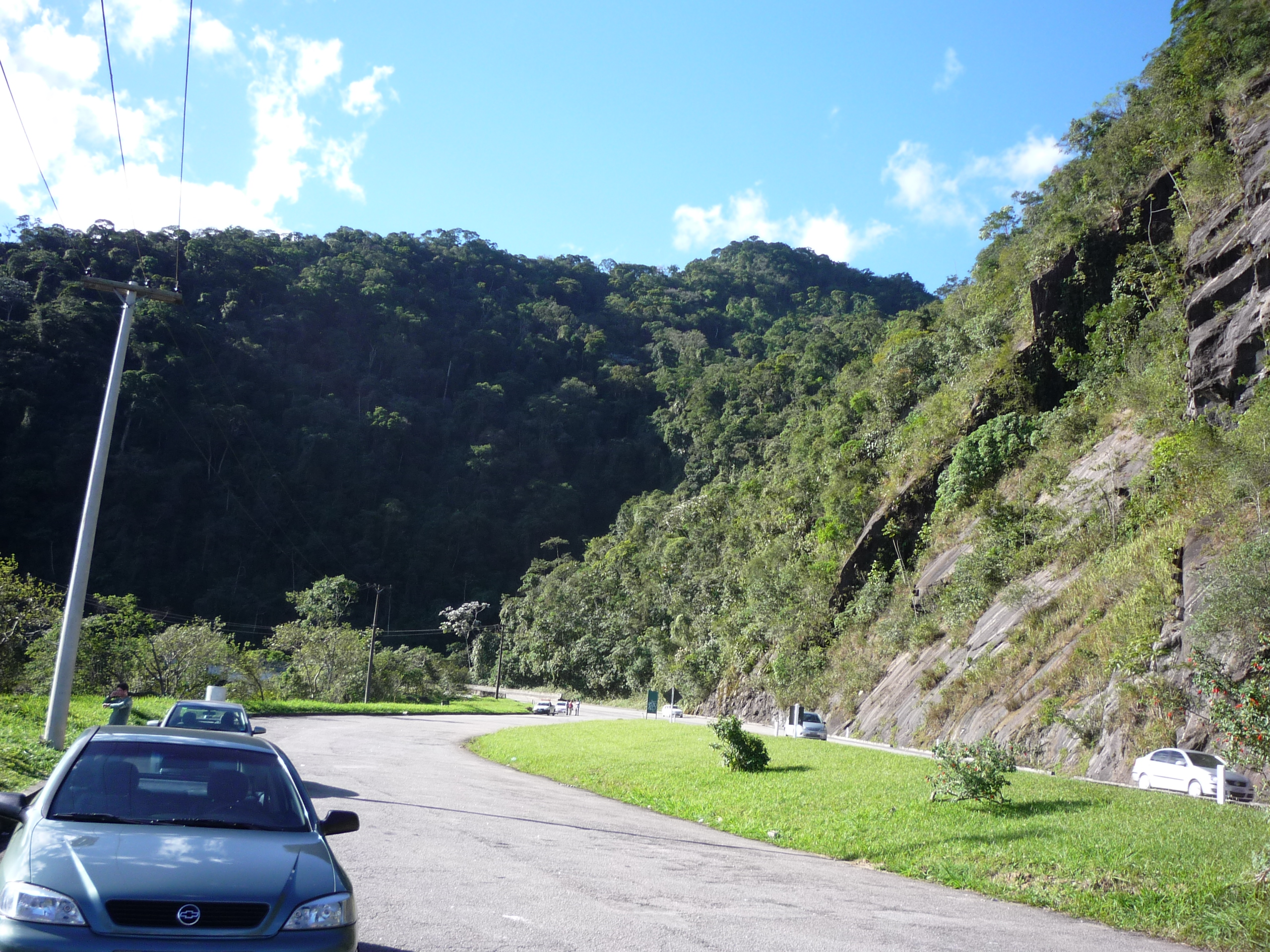

- Location within Brazil
- Nearest city: Petrópolis, Rio de Janeiro
- Coordinates: 22°30′11″S 43°10′22″W
- Area: 16.7 hectares (41 acres)
- Designation: Municipal nature park
- Created: 2002
- Administrator: Secretaria Municipal de Meio Ambiente

The Petrópolis Municipal Nature Park (Portuguese: Parque Natural Municipal de Petrópolis) is a municipal nature park in the state of Rio de Janeiro, Brazil.

== Location ==
The Petrópolis Municipal Nature Park is in the historical center of the city of Petrópolis, Rio de Janeiro. It lies at an altitude of 800 to 1,070 metres (2,620 to 3,510 ft). It covers an area of 16.7 hectares (41 acres) with well preserved Atlantic Forest. There are two walking trails of low or moderate difficulty, with lengths of 800 metres (2,600 ft) and 830 metres (2,720 ft). There are tables and benches where visitors can relax, eat or contemplate nature.

== History ==
The campaign to preserve the area, prevent it being used for other purposes and create the park began in 1992, with various civil societies arranging activities and events. In 2002 these organizations created the Comitê Pró-Parque Ecológico (Committee for the Ecological Park), which mobilized the people of the city to create the park. The Petrópolis Municipal Nature Park was included in the Central Rio de Janeiro Atlantic Forest Mosaic, created in December 2006. It is part of the Petrópolis Environmental Protection Area and the Atlantic Forest Biosphere Reserve.

== Sources ==
- Costa, Cláudia; Lamas, Ivana; Fernandes, Rosan (December 2010), Planejamento Estratégico do Mosaico Central Fluminense (PDF) (in Portuguese), Reserva da Biosfera da Mata Atlântica, archived from the original (PDF) on 2016-10-07
- Parque Natural Municipal de Petrópolis (in Portuguese), Instituto IDEIAS, archived from the original on 2016-10-06
- Parque Natural Municipal de Petrópolis (in Portuguese), Secretaria do Meio Ambiente e Desenvolvimento Sustentável RJ, archived from the original on 2023-02-06
