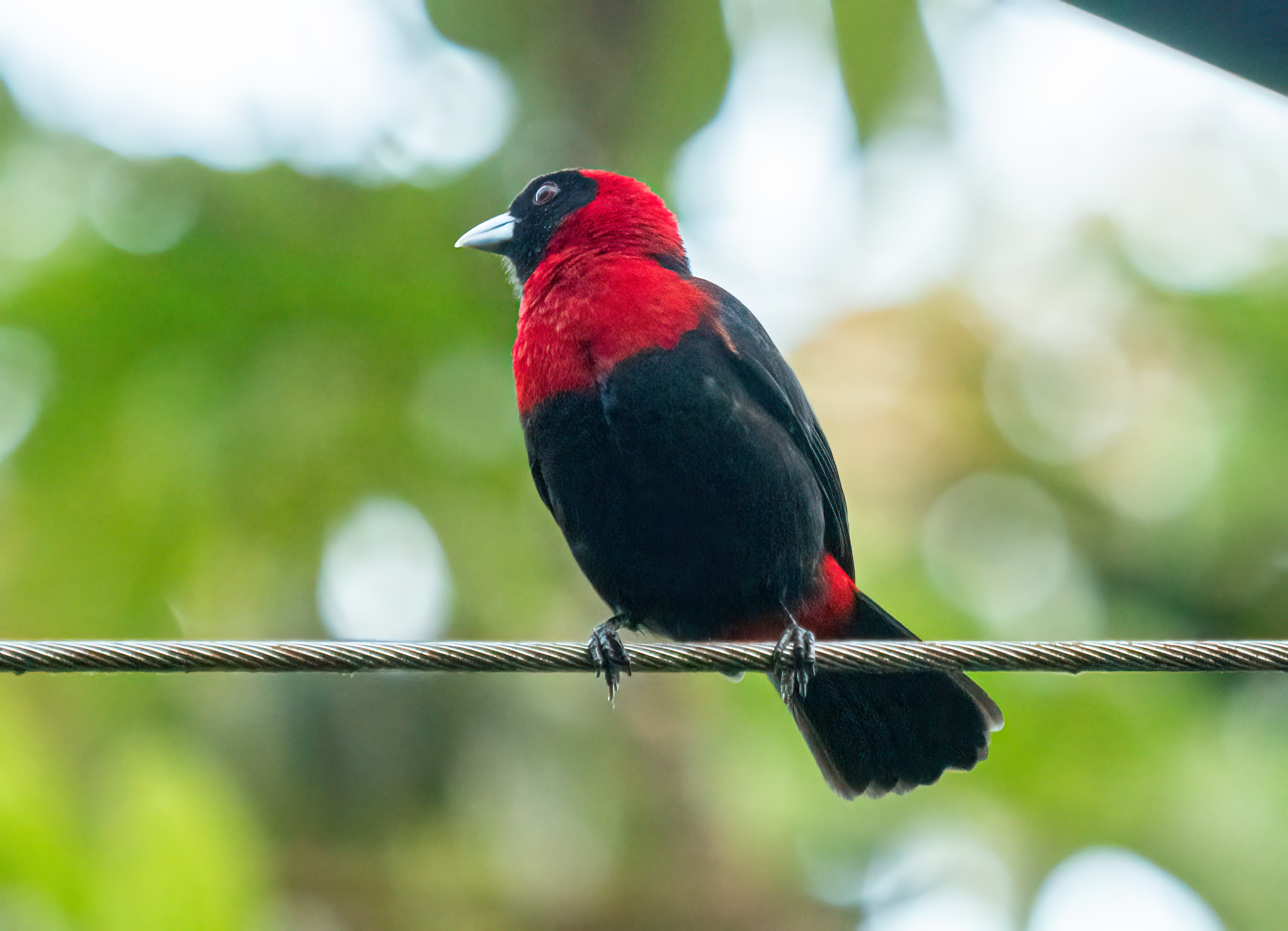
- In Costa Rica

Conservation status
- Least Concern (IUCN 3.1)

Scientific classification
- Kingdom: Animalia
- Phylum: Chordata
- Class: Aves
- Order: Passeriformes
- Family: Thraupidae
- Genus: Ramphocelus
- Species: R. sanguinolentus

Binomial name
- Ramphocelus sanguinolentus (Lesson, 1831)

Synonyms
- See text

= Crimson-collared tanager =

Species of bird

The crimson-collared tanager (Ramphocelus sanguinolentus) is a species of bird in the family Thraupidae, the tanagers and allies. It is found from Mexico to Panama.

== Taxonomy and systematics ==
The crimson-collared tanager was formally described in 1831 with the binomial Tanagra (Tachyphonus) sanguinolentus. In 1850 Charles Lucien Bonaparte transferred it to the genus Ramphocelus that had been erected in 1805. In 1873 Philip Sclater and Osbert Salvin erected the genus Phlogothraupis with sanguinolentus as its sole member. As of September 2026, the most recent lists by major taxonomic systems assign it to Bonaparte's Ramphocelus. However, it appears to be less closely related to the other members of the genus than they are to each other.

The specific epithet sanguinolentus is from the Latin sanguis, which means blood.

The crimson-collared tanager has two subspecies, the nominate R. s. sanguinolentus (Lesson, 1831) and R. s. apricus (Bangs, 1908).

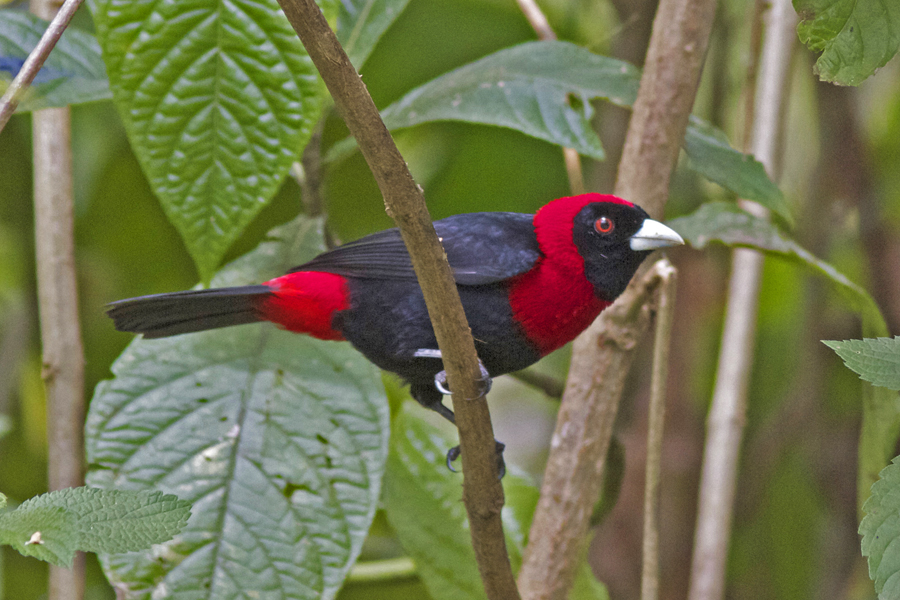
Crimson-collared tanager in Costa Rica

== Description ==
The crimson-collared tanager is 15 to 20 cm (6 to 8 in) long and weighs 35 to 48 g (1.2 to 1.7 oz). The sexes and the subspecies have the same plumage though R. s. apricus is smaller than the nominate. Adults are mostly black with a faint bluish gloss on the back, scapulars, and the edges of the wing coverts. They have a glossy blood-red or crimson hood that surrounds their black face and throat, and extends to include the neck and breast. Their rump, uppertail coverts, and undertail coverts are the same blood-red or crimson. Their underwing coverts are vermillion red. They have a red to reddish brown iris, a silvery white to pale grayish blue bill, and blue-gray to black legs. Juveniles are overall duller with a dark brown base color; they are orangish red where adults are crimson and have a duller bill.

== Distribution and habitat ==
The nominate subspecies of the crimson-collared tanager is the more northerly of the two. It is found on the Gulf/Caribbean slope from Veracruz and northern Oaxaca in southeastern Mexico south (bypassing the Yucatán Peninsula) through northern Guatemala and most of Belize into northern Honduras. Subspecies R. s. apricus is found on the Caribbean slope from eastern Honduras south through Nicaragua and Costa Rica to central Panama's Panamá Province. It range also extends locally across northern Costa Rica and in local areas on Panama's Pacific slope.

The crimson-collared tanager primarily inhabits the edges of evergreen forest and secondary forest in the tropical and lower subtropical zones. It also occurs in abandoned plantations, in pastures with trees, and in the north it has been observed in orchards and fruit trees in lightly human-inhabited areas.

== Behavior ==
=== Movement ===
The crimson-collared tanager is a year-round resident.

=== Feeding ===
The crimson-collared tanager's diet has not been studied but is known to include both arthropods and fruits. It typically forages in tall shrubs and the lower parts of trees between about 2 and 10 m (7 and 33 ft) above the ground. It takes insect prey from thick foliage. It usually is found singly or in pairs; it seldom joins mixed-species feeding flocks though it will share fruiting trees with other species.

=== Breeding ===
The crimson-collared tanager's breeding season has not been defined but spans at least March through May in Nicaragua and April through June in Costa Rica. It includes April in Honduras, May in Belize, and possibly July in Mexico. Its nest is a cup made from leaves, moss, and other plant parts with a lining of fine material such as papery bark and banana leaves. Nests are typically in shrubs or trees at the forest edge or in a clearing and placed about 1 to 6 m (3 to 20 ft) above the ground. The usual clutch is two eggs though three are known; they are pale blue with dark brown and blackish spots. The incubation period and time to fledging are not known. Adults have been observed feeding fledglings but other details of parental care are not known.

=== Vocalization ===
The crimson-collared tanager's song has been described as "a leisurely sequence of rising and falling whistled notes separated by pauses, tueee-teew, chu-che-wee chew, tewee" and also as "a high, squeaky to slightly sweet, jerky series, ssi ss-ssiip si-si-sip, etc.". Its calls include "a thin, querulous tsewee or weet weee with rising inflection" and "a grating chuck" that might be an alarm call.

== Status ==
The IUCN has assessed the crimson-collared tanager as being of Least Concern. It has a very large range; its estimated population of at least 500,000 mature individuals is believed to be decreasing. No immediate threats have been identified. It is considered fairly common in northern Central America and Costa Rica. "Its range encompasses a number of parks and reserves [and] also encompasses much suitable habitat that is not formally protected."
