= Ilhas dos Currais Marine National Park =

National park in Paraná, Brazil

- Parque Nacional Marinho das Ilhas dos Currais
- IUCN category II (national park)
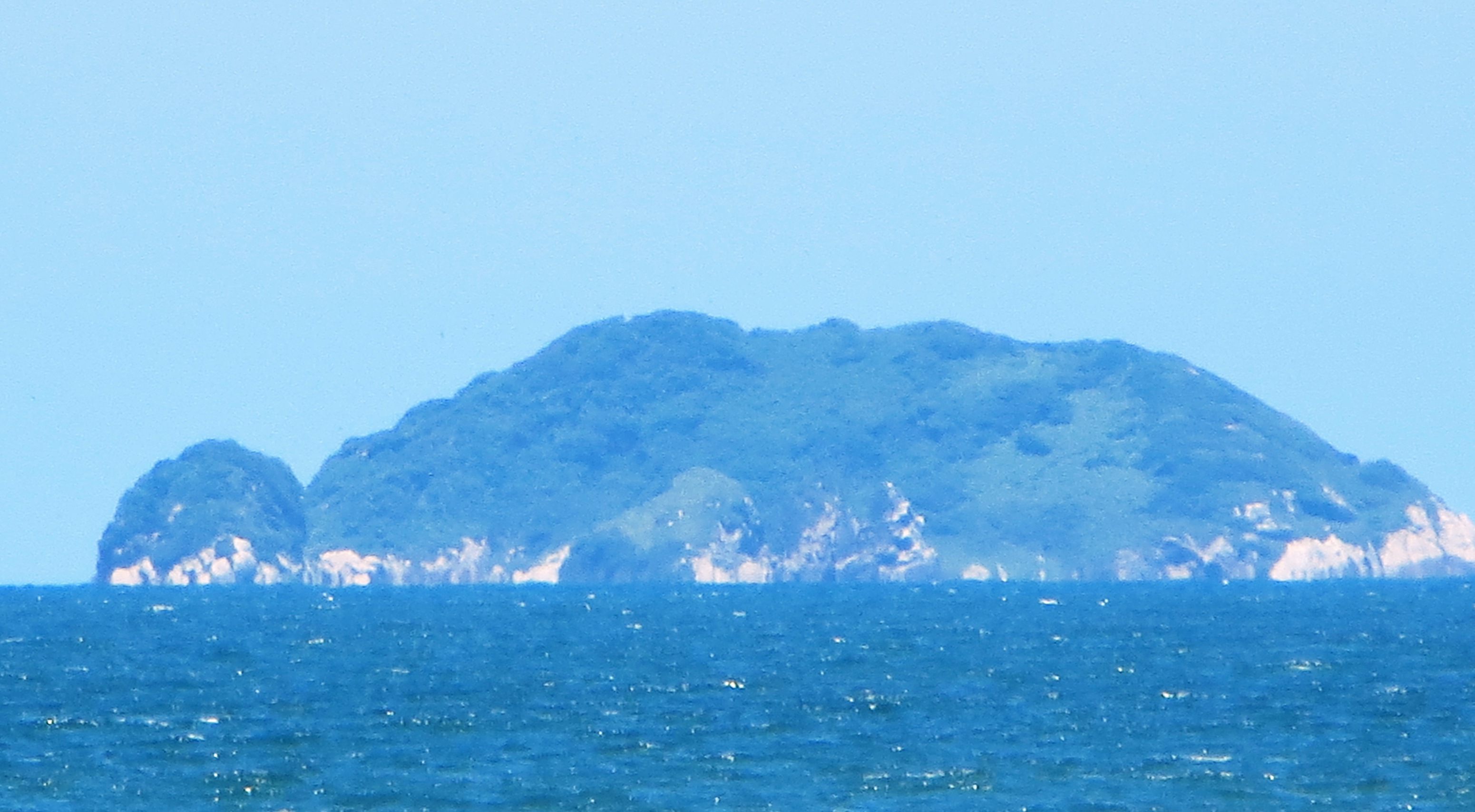
- Ilha dos Currais from Costa Azul Beach, Matinhos, 12 kilometres (7.5 mi) away

- Location within Brazil
- Nearest city: Pontal do Paraná, Paraná
- Coordinates: 25.735833°S 48.365278°W
- Area: 1,359.70 hectares (3,359.9 acres)
- Designation: National park
- Created: 20 June 2013
- Administrator: Chico Mendes Institute for Biodiversity Conservation

The Ilhas dos Currais Marine National Park (Portuguese: Parque Nacional Marinho das Ilhas dos Currais) is a national park in the state of Paraná, Brazil. It protects an important nesting site for birds, and is a refuge and feeding ground for fish including two endangered species of grouper. It may be visited for diving, but visitors must be careful to avoid any impact on the environment.

== Location ==
The Ilhas dos Currais Marine National Park is in the municipality of Pontal do Paraná in the state of Paraná. It has an area of 1,359.70 hectares (3,359.9 acres). The Ilhas dos Currais archipelago consists of the islands of Grapirá, Três Picos and Filhote. The archipelago is offshore in the Atlantic between Guaratuba Bay and Paranaguá Bay, 6.2 miles (10.0 km) from the coast opposite the Praia de Leste (East Beach) of Pontal do Paraná. The three small islands have rocky headlands that rise from the sea without beaches.

== Environment ==
The islands are home to an estimated 8,000 birds. Studies by the Centre of Sea Studies of the Federal University of Paraná almost twenty years before the reserve was formed showed the great importance of the islands for the brown booby (Sula leucogaster) and magnificent frigatebird (Fregata magnificens), which reproduce around the year. The islands are also used seasonally by the kelp gull (Larus dominicanus), black-crowned night heron (Nycticorax nycticorax) and great egret (Ardea alba), and in some years by the South American tern (Sterna hirundinacea).

About 44 fish species use the waters around the island for food and refuge, including the endangered dusky grouper (Mycteroperca marginata) and Atlantic goliath grouper (Epinephelus itajara). Conservation of fish stocks around the island should benefit artisan fishermen who fish in the vicinity of the archipelago. Visibility in the water is from 0 to 10 metres (0 to 33 ft). The environment is threatened by over-fishing and excessive visits, so divers must be careful not to affect the ecosystem.

== History ==
The Ilhas dos Currais Marine National Park is the second conservation unit created in Brazil by federal law, the usual process being by executive decree. The first was the Saint-Hilaire/Lange National Park in 2001. The bill was proposed in 2002 by congressman Luciano Pizzatto. It was finally passed by the Senate on 21 May 2013 and submitted for presidential approval. The Ilhas dos Currais Marine National Park was created by federal law 12.829 of 20 June 2013, signed by president Dilma Rousseff. It is the third marine park in the country after the Abrolhos and Fernando de Noronha marine national parks. It is a step towards the Nagoya Protocol goal to have 10% of coastal and marine areas protected by 2020.

The park is administered by the Chico Mendes Institute for Biodiversity Conservation (ICMBio). It is classed as IUCN protected area category II (national park). The purpose is to protect the ecosystems of the Currais islands and surrounding marine environment, protecting important nesting areas for several species of birds and the habitat of marine species.

== Sources ==
- "Governo cria Parque Nacional Marinho da Ilha dos Currais", ((o))eco (in Portuguese), 25 June 2013
- "Ilhas dos Currais - PR", Pontos de Mergulho (in Portuguese)
- Luciene de Assis (24 June 2013), Ilhas dos Currais viram parque marinho (in Portuguese), MMA
- PARNA Marinho das Ilhas dos Currais (in Portuguese), Chico Mendes Institute for Biodiversity Conservation, archived from the original on 2019-08-21
- PARNA Marinho das Ilhas dos Currais, ISA: Instituto Socioambiental
- Sobre o Parque Nacional Marinho das Ilhas dos Currais (in Portuguese), Parque Nacional de Saint-Hilaire/Lange, 17 September 2013
- Unidade de Conservação: Parque Nacional Marinho das Ilhas dos Currais (in Portuguese), MMA: Ministério do Meio Ambiente
