= Marapendi Municipal Nature Park =

Municipal nature park in Rio de Janeiro, Brazil

- Parque Natural Municipal de Marapendi
- IUCN category II (national park)
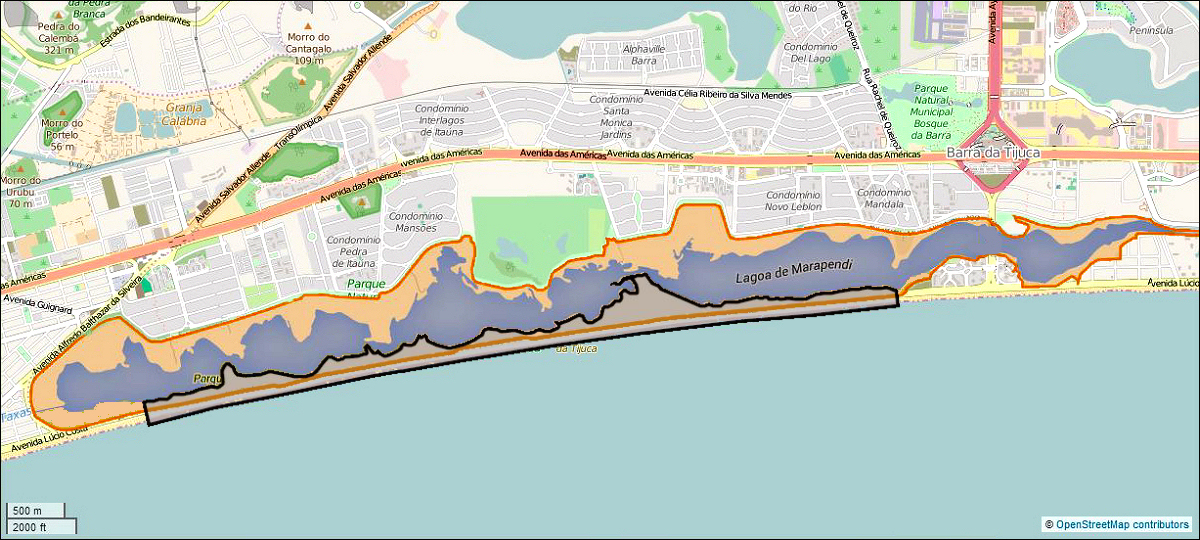

- Location within Brazil
- Nearest city: Rio de Janeiro
- Coordinates: 23°00′39″S 43°22′36″W
- Area: 155 hectares (380 acres)
- Designation: Municipal nature park
- Created: 1978

The Marapendi Natural Municipal Park (Portuguese: Parque Natural Municipal de Marapendi) is a municipal nature park, a public recreation facility of approximately 155 hectares (380 acres) within the Marapendi Natural Reserve (Portuguese: Reserva de Marapendi), located in the Barra da Tijuca and Recreio neighborhoods of Rio de Janeiro, Brazil and part of a protected area for the preservation of native plants and animals.

The park is part of the Carioca Mosaic, established in 2011.

== Sources ==
- Mosaico Carioca de Áreas Protegidas (in Portuguese), MMA
