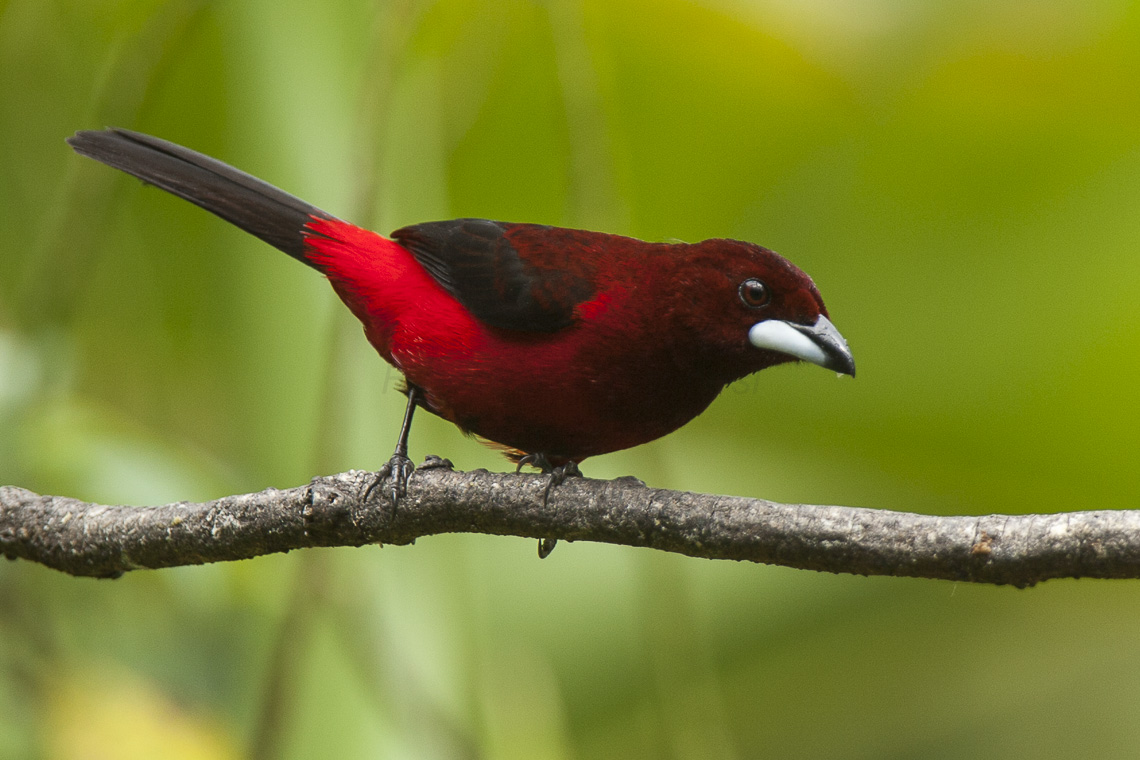
- Male R. d. isthmicus, Panama
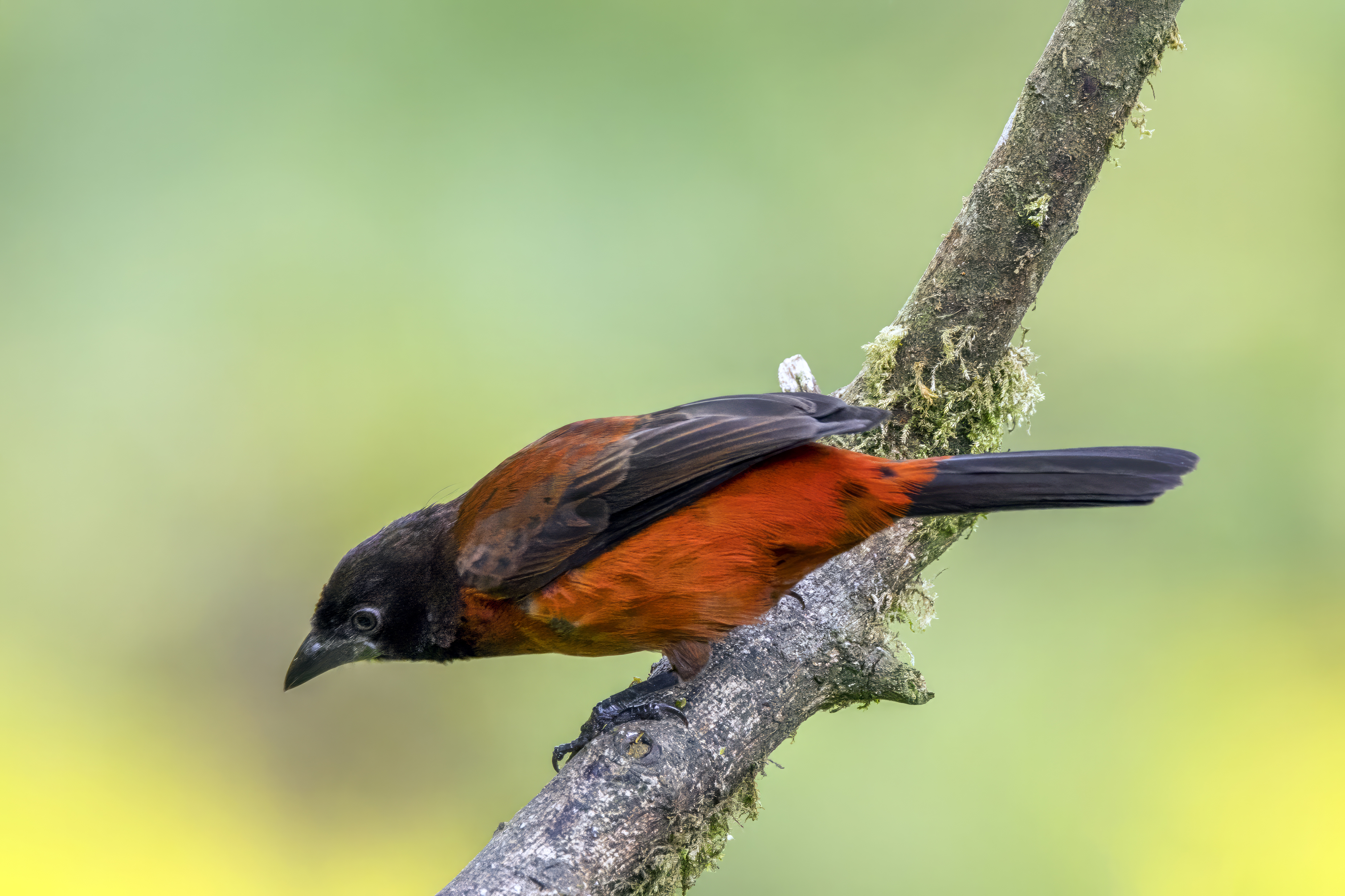
- female R. d. molochinus, Colombia

Conservation status
- Least Concern (IUCN 3.1)

Scientific classification
- Kingdom: Animalia
- Phylum: Chordata
- Class: Aves
- Order: Passeriformes
- Family: Thraupidae
- Genus: Ramphocelus
- Species: R. dimidiatus

Binomial name
- Ramphocelus dimidiatus Lafresnaye, 1837

= Crimson-backed tanager =

Species of bird

The crimson-backed tanager (Ramphocelus dimidiatus) is a species of bird in the family Thraupidae, the tanagers and allies. It is native to Colombia, Panama, and Venezuela and has an introduced population in French Polynesia. A local name in Panama is sangre de toro ("Blood of the bull").

== Taxonomy and systematics ==
The crimson-backed tanager was formally described by French naturalist Frédéric de Lafresnaye in 1837 with its current binomial Ramphocelus dimidiatus. It is one of eight species of brightly colored tanagers in the genus Ramphocelus. Mitochondrial DNA evidence indicates that its closest relative is the masked crimson tanager (R. nigrogularis), and the two split around 800,000 years ago.

The crimson-backed tanager's further taxonomy is unsettled. The IOC, AviList, and BirdLife International's Handbook of the Birds of the World assign it these four subspecies:

- R. d. arestus Wetmore, 1957
- R. d. limatus Bangs, 1901
- R. d. dimidiatus Lafresnaye, 1837
- R. d. molochinus Meyer de Schauensee, 1950

However, as of late 2025 the Clements taxonomy adds a fifth, R. d. isthmicus, that the others include in R. d. dimidiatus.

This article follows the majority four-subspecies model.

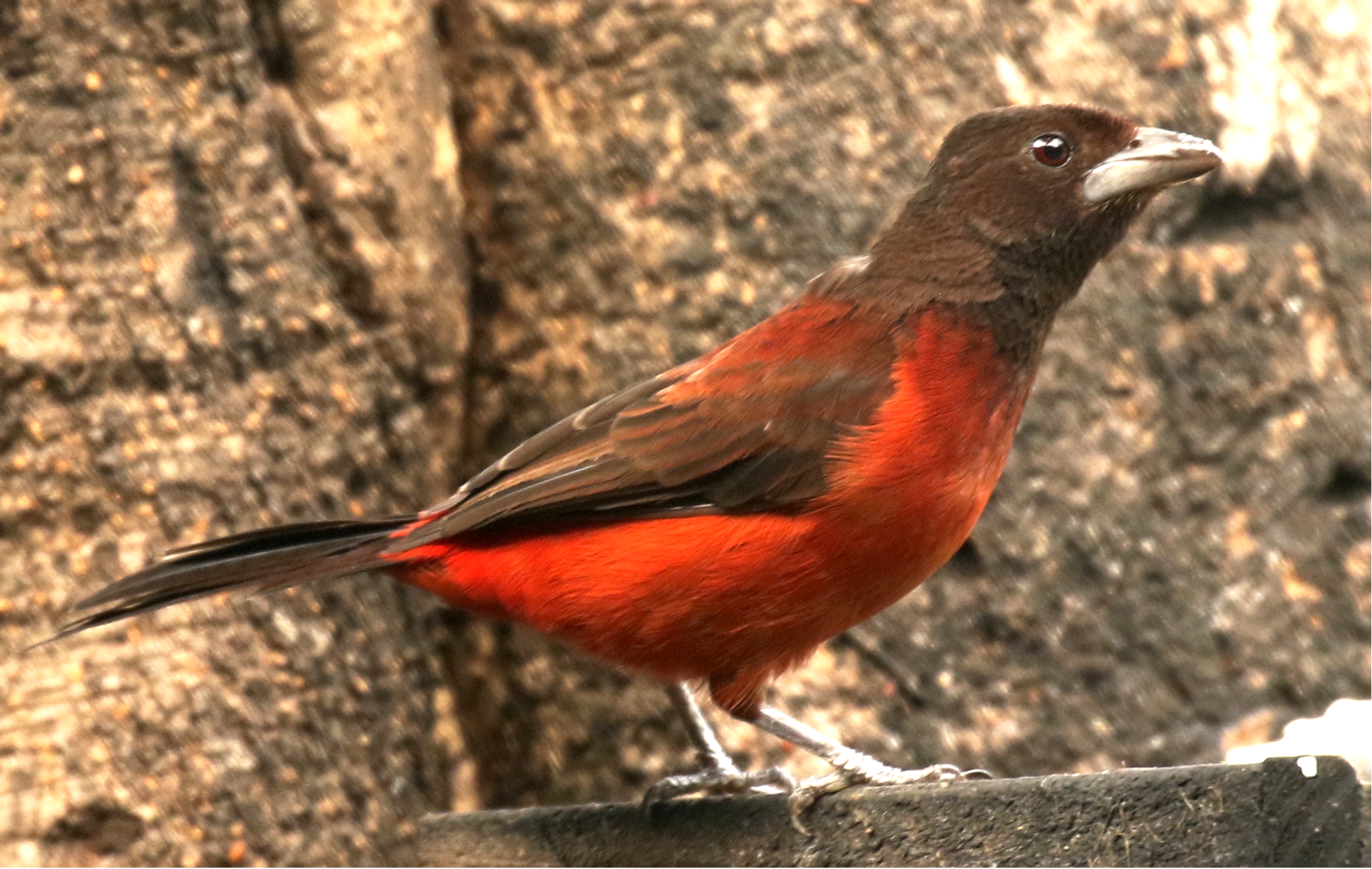
Female R. d. dimidiatus, Panama City

== Description ==
The crimson-backed tanager is about 16 cm (6.3 in) long and weighs about 24 to 34 g (0.85 to 1.2 oz). It has a heavy bill with a wide base to the mandible. The species is sexually dimorphic. Adult males of the nominate subspecies R. d. dimidiatus have a deep blackish maroon-red head, mantle, throat, and breast. The color changes to redder on the back and bright red on the lower back, rump, and uppertail coverts. Their head has a plush appearance and their back is shiny. Their wings and tail are black. Their lower breast, belly, and undertail coverts are mostly bright red with black thighs and black in the center of the belly. Adult females have a similar pattern to males but are much duller overall. Their head and mantle are dusky brown with a reddish tinge and their throat is nearly black. Their back is dull reddish and their lower back, rump, breast, and belly are a much duller red than the male's. Immature birds resemble adult females.

The other subspecies of the crimson-backed tanager differ from the nominate and each other thus:

- R. d. arestus: darkest subspecies; males with less black on the belly but deeper red especially on the belly; females darker than others
- R. d. limatus: males have less black on the belly and their red parts are more scarlet (less orangey)
- R. d. molochinus: male's crown, nape, throat, and breast are slightly darker than nominate's

Both sexes of all subspecies have a reddish brown iris and gray to blackish legs. Males have a dusky maxilla and a bluish white mandible with a dusky tip. Females have a dusky gray maxilla with a dark brownish gray base and a dark brownish gray mandible.

== Distribution and habitat ==
The subspecies of the crimson-backed tanager are found thus:

- R. d. arestus: Coiba Island in the Pacific off western Panama
- R. d. limatus: Pearl Islands in the Gulf of Panama
- R. d. dimidiatus: all of Panama except the far northwest and across northern Colombia into western Venezuela. In Colombia its southern limit is the upper valley of the Cauca River, the lower valley of the Magdalena River, and Norte de Santander Department. In Venezuela it surrounds Lake Maracaibo from northwestern Zulia south to northern Táchira and then northeast to eastern Zulia and Trujillo state
- R. d. molochinus: upper valley of the Magdalena River in west-central Colombia

The species escaped or was released from a private aviary in Tahiti in the early twentieth century and is established there.

The crimson-backed tanager primarily inhabits somewhat open landscapes including the edges of moist to humid forest, shrublands, and areas near people such as farmland, parks, and gardens. It is found less often in dry scrublands and seldom in the interior of humid forest except on Coiba Island. In elevation it ranges from sea level to about 1,600 m (5,200 ft) in Panama, to 2,200 m (7,200 ft) in Colombia, and to 1,300 m (4,300 ft) in Venezuela.

== Behavior ==
=== Movements ===
The crimson-backed tanager is a year-round resident.

=== Feeding ===
The crimson-backed tanager feeds on insects, fruit, and seeds. In the breeding season it usually forages in pairs or family groups and outside it in flocks of its species. It sometimes joins mixed-species feeding flocks. It feeds mostly in the undergrowth and up to middle levels on the edge of forest. It takes most food while hopping through foliage and also visits feeding stations for fruit. It often roosts in flocks that may number more than 50 individuals.

=== Breeding ===
The crimson-backed tanager's breeding season has not been fully defined but apparently spans from February to June in Panama. Nesting evidence in Colombia has been found in February, between April and August, and in November and December. The female builds the cup nest from dead leaves and coarse fibers and lines it with finer fibers. It typically is well hidden in a bush or small tree between about 1 and 3 m (3 and 10 ft) above the ground. The clutch is two eggs that are pale blue or greenish blue sparsely marked with deep brown, black, or lilac. The female alone incubates. Fledging occurs 10 to 11 days after hatch and both parents provision nestlings. The previous brood sometimes remains and assists with feeding.

=== Other ===
A field study on blood parasites found that two crimson-backed tanagers out of twelve tested bore Plasmodium, with the study concluding the overall rate was low compared with studies done elsewhere.

=== Vocalization ===
In Venezuela the crimson-backed tanager sings "a long, slow series of rather clipped single or double notes, reet, skréa, seek, reé-a, séea, bz-weet, wit-weet, fzeet, reéza, bzeep, skeéa". The song is slightly buzzy and may continue for many minutes without pause. The species' most common call is "a nasal chank".

== Status ==
The IUCN has assessed the crimson-backed tanager as being of Least Concern. It has a very large range; its estimated population of at least 500,000 mature individuals is believed to be stable. No immediate threats have been identified. It is considered "common to frequent" on mainland Panama, "common" in Colombia, and "fairly common to common" in Venezuela.
