= Municipal nature park (Brazil) =

A municipal nature park (Portuguese: parque natural municipal) in Brazil is a type of protected area operated by one of the municipalities. Their goal is to preserve important or beautiful natural ecosystems. Public access is allowed subject to regulations defined by the responsible agency.

== Definition ==
Municipal parks fall under the same regulations as national parks, defined by law 9.985 of July 2000. The park's basic objective is preservation of natural ecosystems of great ecological relevance and scenic beauty. This enables the conduct of scientific research and the development of educational activities and environmental interpretation, recreation in contact with nature and eco tourism. The park is publicly owned, and private areas included in its limits will be expropriated when it is established. Public visitation is subject to the rules and restrictions set out in Unit Management Plan, rules established by the body responsible for its administration, and those provided for by regulation. Scientific research requires prior authorization from the agency responsible for managing the unit and is subject to conditions and restrictions established by the agency.

Municipal parks are classed as IUCN protected area category II (national park).

== Examples ==
Name	State	Area (ha)	Created	Biome
Araponga Municipal Nature Park	Rio de Janeiro	1,376	2006	Atlantic Forest
Cachoeira da Fumaça e Jacuba Natural Park	Rio de Janeiro	363	1988	Atlantic Forest
Lagoa do Frio Municipal Nature Park	Sergipe	279	2001	Caatinga
Lagoa do Parado Municipal Nature Park	Paraná			Atlantic Forest
Marapendi Municipal Nature Park	Rio de Janeiro	155	1978	Coastal Marine
Montanhas de Teresópolis Municipal Nature Park	Rio de Janeiro	4,397	2009	Atlantic Forest
Petrópolis Municipal Nature Park	Rio de Janeiro	17	2002	Atlantic Forest
Restinga Municipal Nature Park	Paraná	407	2001	Atlantic Forest
Rio Perequê Municipal Nature Park	Paraná	16	2001	Atlantic Forest
Rio Pombo Nature Park	Rio de Janeiro	6.7	1988	Atlantic Forest
Serra do Barbosão Municipal Nature Park	Rio de Janeiro	878	2007	Atlantic Forest
Taquara Municipal Nature Park	Rio de Janeiro	19	1992	Atlantic Forest

== Sources ==
- Lei No 9.985, de 18 de Julho de 2000 (in Portuguese), Presidência da República - Casa Civil- Subchefia para Assuntos Jurídicos, 18 July 2000
