= Center for Marine Studies =

Coordinates: 25°34′26″S 48°21′01″W

Center for Marine Studies Federal University of Paraná
- Centro de Estudos do Mar; Universidade Federal do Paraná
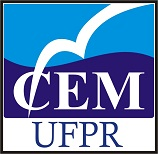
- Established: 1982
- Director: Prof. José Guilherme Bersano Filho
- Vice-Director: Prof. Carlos Adalberto Schnaider Batista
- Location: Pontal do Paraná, Paraná, Brazil
- Website: www.cem.ufpr.br

The Center for Marine Studies (Portuguese: Centro de Estudos do Mar, CEM) is a satellite campus and marine research station of the Federal University of Paraná (Portuguese: Universidade Federal do Paraná, UFPR), located in the municipality of Pontal do Paraná, Brazil. Established in 1982 as a marine biology laboratory, it has since extended its activities into the fields of physical, chemical and geological oceanography, coastal management and environmental social science. It offers undergraduate courses in Oceanography, Aquaculture Engineering, Civil Engineering, Environmental Engineering and Natural Sciences, besides sponsoring a graduate program in Ocean and Coastal Systems.
