= São José do Vale do Rio Preto =

- Municipality
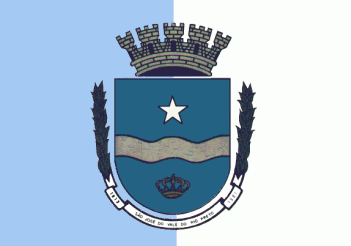
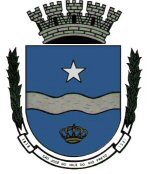
- Flag Coat of arms

- Within Rio de Janeiro state
- Coordinates: 22°09′03″S 42°55′26″W
- Established: 15/12/1987

Government
  - Prefect: Adilson Faraco Brügger de Oliveira

Area
  - Total: 239.950 km^{2} (92.645 sq mi)
- Elevation: 615 m (2,018 ft)

Population (2020)
  - Total: 21,916
  - Density: 91.336/km^{2} (236.56/sq mi)
- Demonym: valeriopretano
- Time zone: UTC−3 (BRT)
- Website: sjvriopreto.rj.gov.br

São José do Vale do Rio Preto (Portuguese pronunciation: [sɐ̃w ʒuˈzɛ du ˈvali du ˈʁi.u ˈpɾetu]) is a municipality located in the Brazilian state of Rio de Janeiro. Its population was 21,916 (2020) and its area is 240 km^{2}.

The municipality contains the 346-hectare (850-acre) Pedra das Flores Natural Monument, created in 2005. It contains the 13,223-hectare (32,670-acre) Maravilha Environmental Protection Area and the 1,979-hectare (4,890-acre) Araponga Municipal Nature Park, both created in 2006. It is part of the Central Rio de Janeiro Atlantic Forest Mosaic of conservation units, created in 2006.

São José do Vale borders the municipalities of Sapucaia, Areal, and Chiador, and is located 29 km northeast of Teresópolis.
