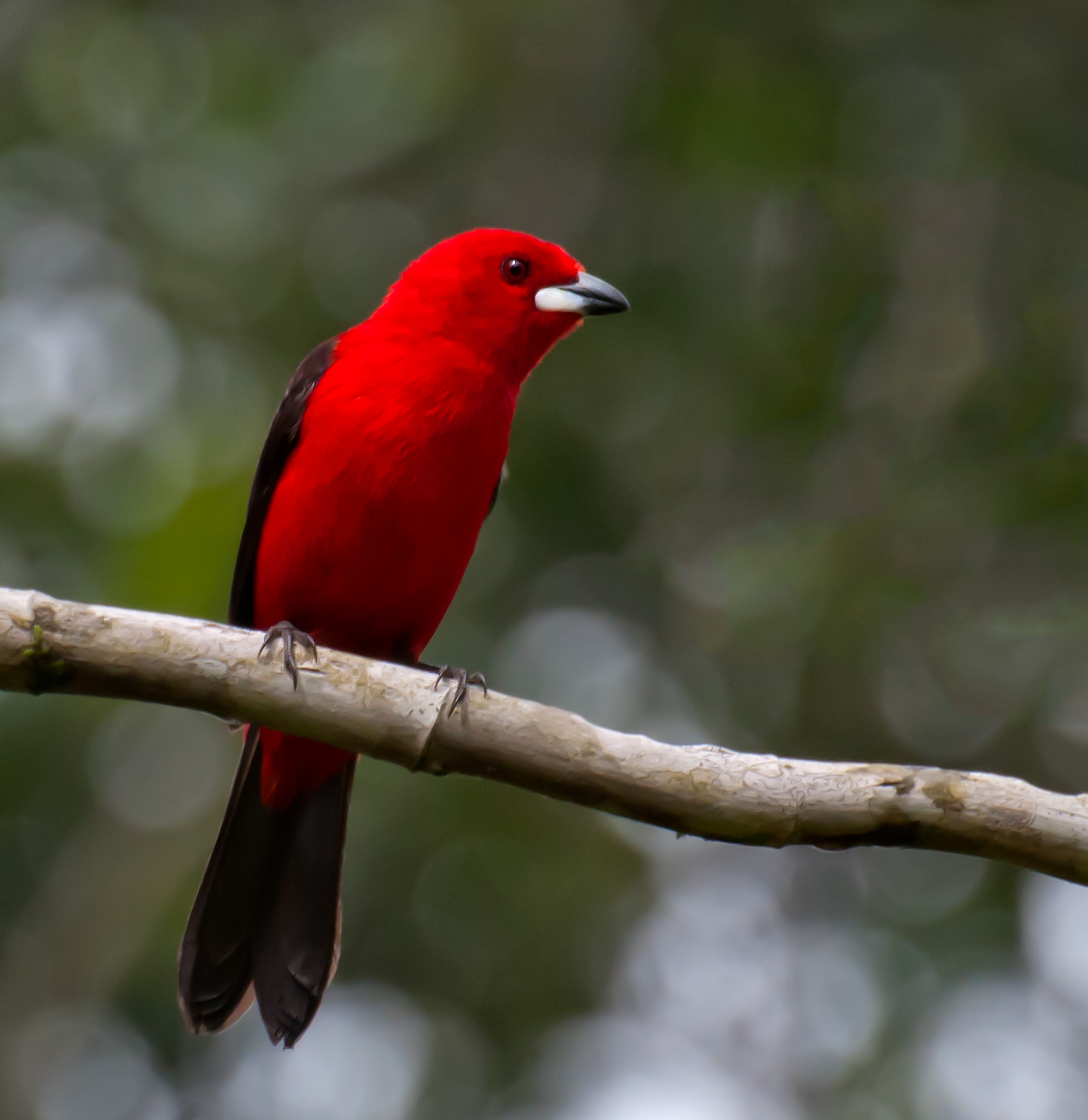
- Male
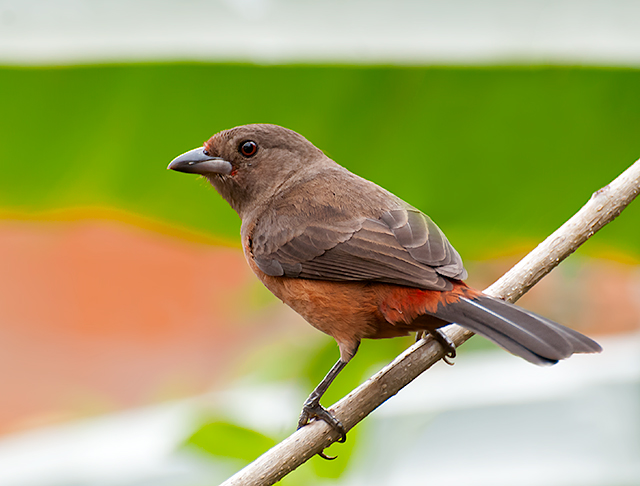
- Female in Registro, São Paulo, Brazil

Conservation status
- Least Concern (IUCN 3.1)

Scientific classification
- Kingdom: Animalia
- Phylum: Chordata
- Class: Aves
- Order: Passeriformes
- Family: Thraupidae
- Genus: Ramphocelus
- Species: R. bresilia

Binomial name
- Ramphocelus bresilia (Linnaeus, 1766)

Synonyms
- Tanagra bresilius Linnaeus, 1766

= Brazilian tanager =

Species of bird

The Brazilian tanager (Ramphocelus bresilia) is a species of bird in the family Thraupidae, the tanagers and allies. It is endemic to Brazil though possibly has occurred in Argentina.

== Taxonomy and systematics ==
The Swedish naturalist Carl Linnaeus formally described the Brazilian tanager in 1766 in the twelfth edition of his Systema Naturae. He coined the binomial name Tanagra bresilia. It is now one of eight species in the genus Ramphocelus which was introduced by the French zoologist Anselme Gaëtan Desmarest in 1805. Several taxonomic systems spell the specific epithet bresilius.

The Brazilian tanager has two subspecies, the nominate R. b. bresilia (Linnaeus, 1766) and R. b. dorsalis (Sclater, PL, 1855).

== Description ==
The Brazilian tanager is about 18 cm (7 in) long and weighs 27.9 to 35.5 g (0.98 to 1.3 oz). It has a heavy bill with a wide base to the mandible. The species is sexually dimorphic. Adult males of the nominate subspecies are mostly rich shiny red that is slightly darker on the back; the feathers of the central back have black bases that sometimes show. Their head, neck, and throat have a plush appearance. Their wings and tail are black, sometimes with inconspicuous red tips on the median upperwing coverts. Adult females have a grayish brown head, neck, throat, upperparts, wings, and tail, though sometimes the forecrown and rump have a reddish tinge. Their breast, belly, and undertail coverts are brownish red. Males of subspecies R. b. dorsalis have a darker red back than the nominate; females are like the nominate. Both sexes of both subspecies have a reddish brown iris and dull brown to slate-gray legs. Males have a blackish bill with a white basal half on the mandible. Females have a dusky brown bill.

== Distribution and habitat ==
The nominate subspecies of the Brazilian tanager is the more northerly of the two. It is found from Paraiba in Brazil's far east south to Bahia. Subspecies R. b. dorsalis is found from Bahia, eastern Minas Gerais, and Espírito Santo south to northeastern Santa Catarina state. There are also scattered records from interior Brazil. Though some sources also include northwestern Argentina's Misiones Province in the species' range, the South American Classification Committee has only unconfirmed records there. The Brazilian tanager inhabits the edges and clearings of forest and more open non-forested landscapes such as parks, gardens, towns, and the edges of marshes. It often is found near water including the ocean. In elevation it ranges from sea level to 1,000 m (3,300 ft).

== Behavior ==
=== Movement ===
As far as is known, the Brazilian tanager is a year-round resident. However, flocks have been reported in the austral winter, "suggesting that those in extreme [south] of range may undertake some minor migratory movements".

=== Feeding ===
The Brazilian tanager feeds on arthropods and fruits. Pulpy fruits and those of figs (Ficus) have been noted, and in one study almost a third of its insect prey was beetles (Coleoptera). It typically forages in pairs and only seldom in larger groups, unlike several other Ramphocelus species.

=== Breeding ===
The Brazilian tanager's breeding season has not been defined but includes November. Its nest is a cup made from grasses and other plant material and is typically placed not far above the ground in a clump of grass, bush, or small tree. The clutch is two or three eggs that are greenish blue with a few black and gray markings. In captivity the female alone incubates, for about 13 days, and nestlings are provisioned by both parents. The shiny cowbird (Molothrus bonariensis) is a frequent brood parasite.

=== Vocalization ===
The Brazilian tanager's song is "a melodious and leisurely jewle-jewle-jewle..., repeated". It has also been written as a "staccato tju, single or in series". Its call notes include "hard jep,jip, ist and sst-sst.

== Status ==
The IUCN has assessed the Brazilian tanager as being of Least Concern. It has a large range; its population size is not known but is believed to be stable. No immediate threats have been identified. It is considered "common to frequent" in Brazil. It occurs in many protected areas, and its use of "a variety of habitats, including many second-growth and disturbed habitats, buffers this species against potential threats".
