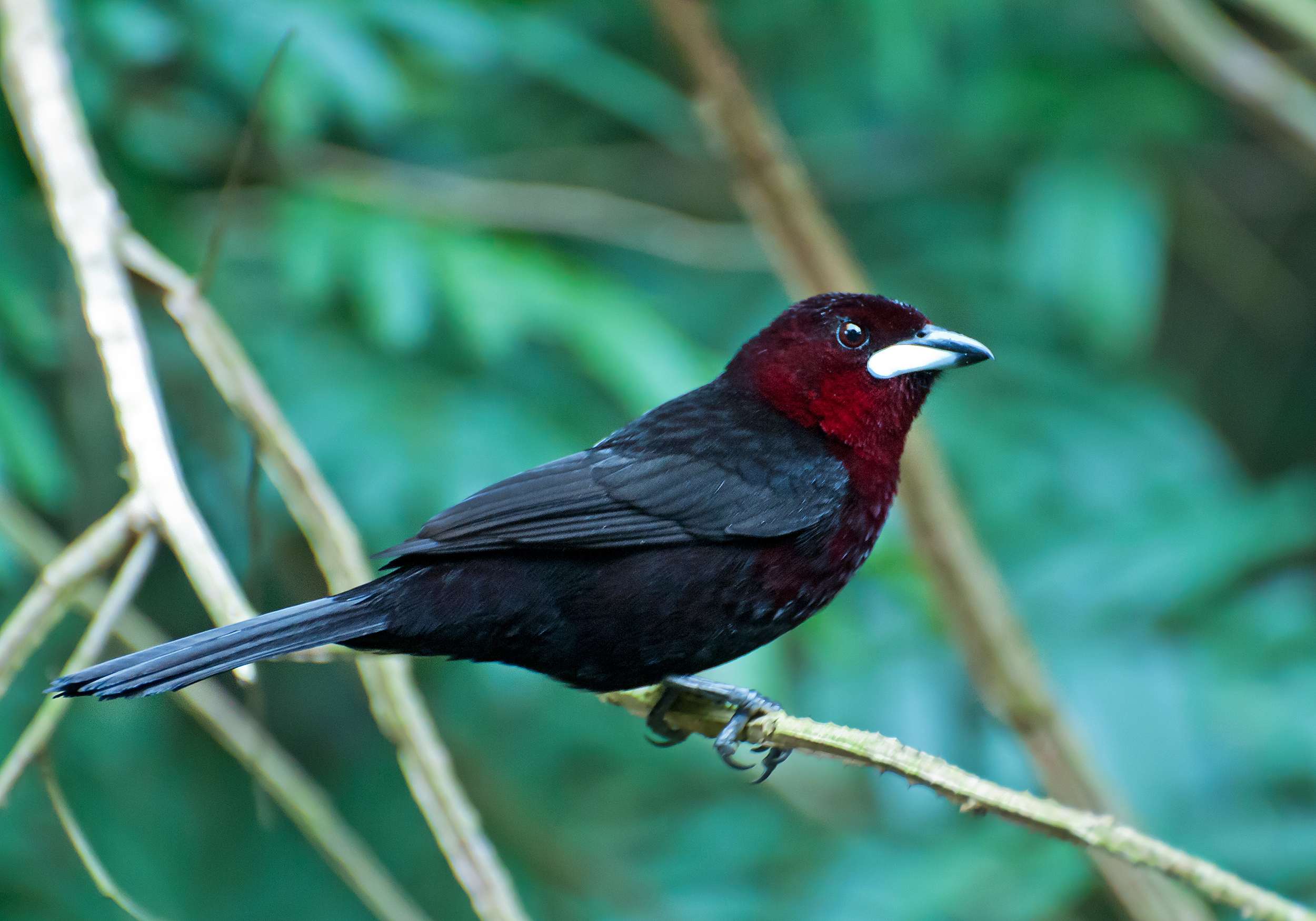
- Male in São Paulo, Brazil
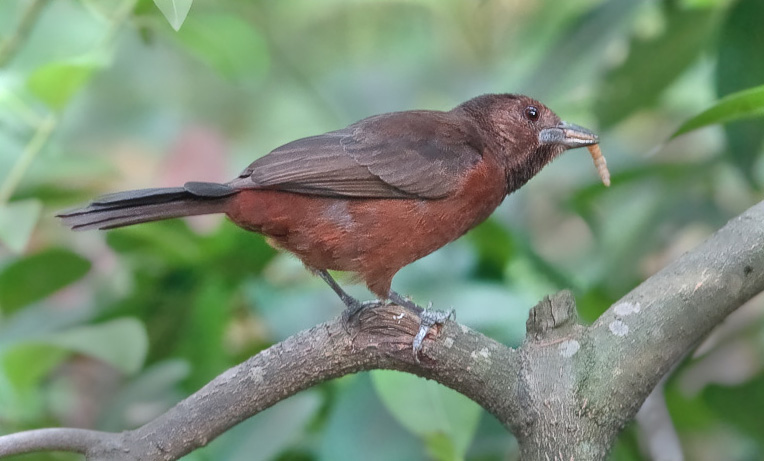
- Female

Conservation status
- Least Concern (IUCN 3.1)

Scientific classification
- Kingdom: Animalia
- Phylum: Chordata
- Class: Aves
- Order: Passeriformes
- Family: Thraupidae
- Genus: Ramphocelus
- Species: R. carbo

Binomial name
- Ramphocelus carbo (Pallas, 1764)

= Silver-beaked tanager =

Species of bird

The silver-beaked tanager (Ramphocelus carbo) is a species of bird in the family Thraupidae, the tanagers and allies. It is found on Trinidad and in every mainland South American country except Chile and Uruguay, though it is recorded in Argentina only as a vagrant.

== Taxonomy and systematics ==
The silver-beaked tanager was formally described by the German naturalist Peter Simon Pallas in 1764 in an appendix to the catalogue for the auction of the collections of Adriaan Vroeg. He called it "Lanius (Carbo)"; though that name does not follow the rules of the International Code of Zoological Nomenclature, his description is accepted as the first and carbo remains the species' epithet. By 1920 it had been reassigned to its present genus Ramphocelus. (Note: That year Hellmayr described subspecies Ramphocelus carbo centralis so the "parent" had been moved by that time.)

The silver-beaked tanager has these eight subspecies:

- R. c. unicolor Sclater, PL, 1856
- R. c. capitalis Allen, JA, 1892
- R. c. magnirostris Lafresnaye, 1853
- R. c. carbo (Pallas, 1764)
- R. c. venezuelensis Lafresnaye, 1853
- R. c. connectens Berlepsch & Stolzmann, 1896
- R. c. atrosericeus d'Orbigny & Lafresnaye, 1837
- R. c. centralis Hellmayr, 1920

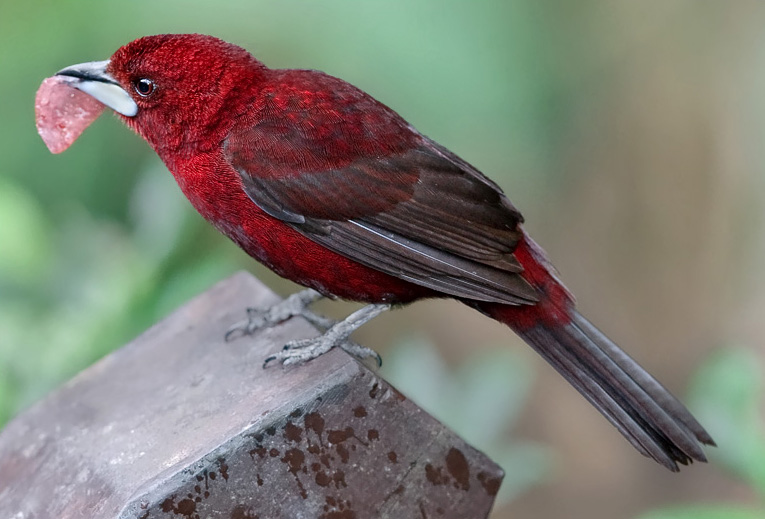
Ramphocelus carbo

== Description ==
The silver-beaked tanager is 16 to 17 cm (6.3 to 6.7 in) long and weighs 21 to 37.5 g (0.74 to 1.3 oz). It has a heavy bill with a wide base to the mandible. The species is sexually dimorphic. Adult males of the nominate subspecies R. c. carbo have a deep carmine head, neck, and throat; they have a plush appearance. Their upperparts including the upperwing and uppertail coverts are carmine-black. Their flight feathers and tail are dusky black. Their breast is rich deep crimson and their belly and undertail coverts black with a crimson tinge. Adult females have a rich dark rusty-red head and upper back and a somewhat redder lower back and rump. Their wings are dusky with rufescent brown edges on the coverts and tertials. Their tail is dusky. Their underparts are rich reddish brown to warm brown with a grayish tinge on the breast. Immature birds resemble adult females.

The other subspecies of the silver-beaked tanager differ from the nominate and each other thus:

- R. c. unicolor: male - brighter red head, more uniform upperparts, back and belly only slightly darker than breast
- R. c. capitalis: male - deep red head, black upperparts, deep crimson chin, throat, and breast; female - redder rump, uppertail coverts, and lower underparts
- R. c. magnirostris: larger and heavier bill; male - more white on mandible; female - more uniformly reddish underparts
- R. c. venezuelensis: male - brighter reds, red-tinged black upperparts, deep crimson chin, throat, and breast and dull charcoal lower underparts
- R. c. connectens: male - paler overall, brownish (less reddish) tinge on back, rump, and lower underparts; female - paler overall
- R. c. atrosericeus: darkest; male - mostly velvety black with dark scarlet head to upper breast; female - overall plain black-brown
- R. c. centralis: male - like connectens with darker red throat

Both sexes of all subspecies have a reddish brown iris and dark horn-gray legs. Males have a dark blue-gray maxilla and a silvery white mandible with a black tip. Females have an entirely brownish dusky bill.

== Distribution and habitat ==
The silver-beaked tanager is found across most of northern and central South America east of the Andes. The subspecies are found thus:

- R. c. unicolor: eastern base of Colombia's Eastern Andes in Casanare and Meta departments
- R. c. capitalis: northeastern Venezuelan states of Anzoátegui, Sucre, Monagas, and Delta Amacuro
- R. c. magnirostris: Trinidad; Guanoco area in Venzuela's Sucre
- R. c. carbo: from southeastern Colombia south through eastern Ecuador into northern Peru to Ucayali Department; from Colombia and Peru east through Venezuela's Amazonas and Bolívar states, the Guianas, and western, northern, and central Brazil north of Mato Grosso
- R. c. venezuelensis: eastern base of the Andes from Arauca and Boyacá departments in eastern Colombia into western Venezuela to a line roughly from Miranda southwest to Apure states
- R. c. connectens: southeastern Peru and adjacent northwestern Bolivia
- R. c. atrosericeus: northern and eastern Bolivia
- R. c. centralis: Brazil from a line roughly from central Mato Grosso east to Bahia south to Santa Catarina (except coastally) and into northeastern Paraguay

The species has also appeared as a vagrant in Argentina.

The silver-beaked tanager inhabits a variety of semi-open landscapes including the edges and clearings of forest, secondary forest, open woodlands, areas around human habitations, and shrubby areas along watercourses. Especially in Brazil it is often near water. In elevation it ranges from sea level to 1,900 m (6,200 ft) north of the Orinoco River in Venezuela, to 1,250 m (4,100 ft) south of it, and to 1,000 m (3,300 ft) in Brazil. It reaches 1,200 m (3,900 ft) in Colombia, 1,100 m (3,600 ft) in Ecuador, and 1,800 m (5,900 ft) in Peru.

== Behavior ==
=== Movement ===
The silver-beaked tanager is a year-round resident.

=== Feeding ===
The silver-beaked tanager feeds mostly on arthropods and fruit and occasionally eats flowers and nectar. Of the fruits it favors Melastomaceae berries. Where its diet has been studied, it feeds on approximately equal amounts of animal and plant foods. It forages "in groups that are noisy, engaging and omnipresent"; the groups may number 10 or more individuals. It forages from the ground mostly to about 12 m (40 ft) up but will feed in fruiting trees as high as 25 m (80 ft). In a study in Trinidad, 77% of its insect prey was taken from foliage, 13% from grass and weeds, 7% in mid-air, and the rest on other substrates like branches.

=== Breeding ===
The silver-beaked tanager's breeding season has not been fully defined, but much is known. Its season spans at least January to March in Colombia, December to September on Trinidad, December to August in Suriname, and September to February in northeastern Brazil. It includes April and May in Venezuela, July and August in French Guiana, and November in Mato Grosso. It sometimes breeds semi-colonially, with nests close together and no defense of the nest against other pairs. It also sometimes breeds cooperatively. The species' nest is a deep bulky cup made from dead leaves and plant fibers; it is typically in a bush between about 1 and 3 m (3 and 10 ft) above the ground. The usual clutch is two eggs though clutches of one and three are known. The eggs are greenish to bluish with dark markings. In a Brazilian study the female alone incubated, for 11 to 13 days, and fledging occurred 11 to 12 days after hatch. Both parents provisioned nestlings.

=== Other ===
The Brazilian study recorded a record longevity for the species of more than 11 years.

=== Vocalization ===
The silver-beaked tanager's song is described as "a quiet, wheezy, repetitive series of short phrases, for example: chichi churee-chew chi-chi churee-chew" and its calls as "a thin, rising wheezy zweet, and a frequently heard hard metallic chep". Another description of the song is "a repetitive series of short, simple, semimusical phrases, e.g, tchu-wee tchu-wee chyeét". Another call is a "loud tchink" that is often doubled.

== Status ==
The IUCN has assessed the silver-beaked tanager as being of Least Concern. It has an extremely large range; its population size is not known but is believed to be stable. No immediate threats have been identified. It is considered "common" in Colombia, "common and conspicuous" in Ecuador, "widespread and common" in Peru, "common" in Venezuela, and "common to frequent" in Brazil. It occurs in many protected areas likes parks and preserves and "is found also in vast areas of unprotected but suitable habitat". It inhabits "many kinds of second growth and disturbed habitats, which buffers this species against potential threats and allows it to profit and expand as forested areas are opened up and settled".
