= Araponga Municipal Nature Park =

Protected area in Rio de Janeiro, Brazil

- Parque Natural Municipal da Araponga
- Location within Brazil
- Nearest city: São José do Vale do Rio Preto, Rio de Janeiro
- Coordinates: 22.235773°S 42.953454°W
- Area: 1,978.9 hectares (4,890 acres)
- Designation: Municipal nature park
- Created: 5 June 2006
- Administrator: Secretaria Municipal de Meio Ambiente de São José do Vale do Rio Preto

The Araponga Municipal Nature Park (Portuguese: Parque Natural Municipal da Araponga) is a municipal nature park in the state of Rio de Janeiro, Brazil.

== Location ==
The Araponga Municipal Nature Park is in the municipality of São José do Vale do Rio Preto, Rio de Janeiro. It has an area of 1,978.9 hectares (4,890 acres). The park protects an area of Atlantic Forest. It is one of the conservation units that protect the sources of the Piabanha River.

== History ==
The Araponga Municipal Nature Park was created by municipal decree 1.653 of 5 June 2006. It is administered by the Municipal Department of the Environment of São José do Vale do Rio Preto. The park was included in the Central Rio de Janeiro Atlantic Forest Mosaic, created in December 2006. As of 2010 there were no planning documents and no consultative council.

== Sources ==
- Costa, Cláudia; Lamas, Ivana; Fernandes, Rosan (December 2010), Planejamento Estratégico do Mosaico Central Fluminense (PDF) (in Portuguese), Reserva da Biosfera da Mata Atlântica, archived from the original (PDF) on 2016-10-07
- Freitas, Leonardo (2010), "Parque Natural Municipal da Araponga – Município de São José do Vale do Rio Preto", Projeto Mosaicos no Corredor da Serra do Mar (PDF) (in Portuguese), IA-RBMA/CEPF
- Parque Nacional da Serra dos Órgãos (in Portuguese), ICMBio
- Reis Soares, Vinicius dos; Brandão Assis, Erika Melo (2012), Relatório de Situação da Região Hidrográfica Méio Paraíba do Sul (PDF) (in Portuguese), Petrópolis – RJ: Associação Pró-Gestão das Águas da Bacia Hidrográfica do Rio Paraíba do Sul
