= Petrópolis Environmental Protection Area =

Protected area of Brazil

- Área de Proteção Ambiental da Região Serrana de Petrópolis
- IUCN category V (protected landscape/seascape)
- Location within Brazil
- Nearest city: Petrópolis
- Coordinates: 22°29′06″S 43°06′47″W
- Area: 68,224 hectares (168,590 acres)
- Designation: Environmental Protection Area
- Created: 20 May 1992

Petrópolis Environmental Protection Area (Portuguese: Área de Proteção Ambiental da Região Serrana de Petrópolis) is a protected area of Rio de Janeiro state, Brazil.

== Location ==
The protected area in the Atlantic Forest biome, which covers 68,224 hectares (168,590 acres), was created on 20 May 1992. It is administered by the Chico Mendes Institute for Biodiversity Conservation. It includes the Serra dos Órgãos National Park. It contains all or part of the municipalities of Petrópolis, Magé, Guapimirim and Duque de Caxias in Rio de Janeiro state.

== Environment ==
Rainfall averages 2,000 millimetres (79 in) annually. Temperatures range from 10 to 28 °C (50 to 82 °F), with an average of 18 °C (64 °F). Altitude ranges from 100 to 2,000 metres (330 to 6,560 ft). The area lies in the orogenic belt of the state of Rio de Janeiro, in the Mantiqueira geological province of the Brazilian platform. Streams and rivers typically have rocky beds and slope steeply, running rapidly after rainfall. The rivers originating in the protection area flow south into Guanabara Bay or north to the Paraíba do Sul. The vegetation is classified as Tropical Rain Forest or Atlantic Forest, but varies greatly due to differences in altitude and the orientation of the slopes. Most of the species are evergreen, since dry periods are short or non-existent in the region.

== Conservation ==
The environment protection area is classed as IUCN protected area category V, protected landscape/seascape. The purpose is to ensure the preservation of the Atlantic Forest ecosystem and the sustainable use of natural resources while conserving the cultural landscape and improving the quality of human life in the region. The conservation unit is in the Central Rio de Janeiro Atlantic Forest Mosaic, created in 2006. Problems include the expansion of urban areas, which has led to poorly planned clearance of slopes causing the risk of landslides, deforestation, and inappropriate agricultural practices including cattle grazing and pasture burning that contribute to soil degradation.

== Sources ==
- APA Petrópolis (in Portuguese), Chico Mendes Institute for Biodiversity Conservation
- Costa, Cláudia; Lamas, Ivana; Fernandes, Rosan (December 2010), Planejamento Estratégico do Mosaico Central Fluminense (PDF) (in Portuguese), Reserva da Biosfera da Mata Atlântica, archived from the original (PDF) on 2016-10-07
- Mapa Interativo (in Portuguese), ICMBio
- MMA/IBAMA (March 2007), Plano de Manejo da APA Petrópolis Resumo Executivo (PDF) (in Portuguese), archived from the original (PDF) on 2016-03-03
- Unidade de Conservação: Área de Proteção Ambiental de Petrópolis (in Portuguese), MMA: Ministério do Meio Ambiente
