= Jacupiranga Mosaic =

Protected environmental region in Brazil

- Mosaico do Jacupiranga
- IUCN category V (protected landscape/seascape)
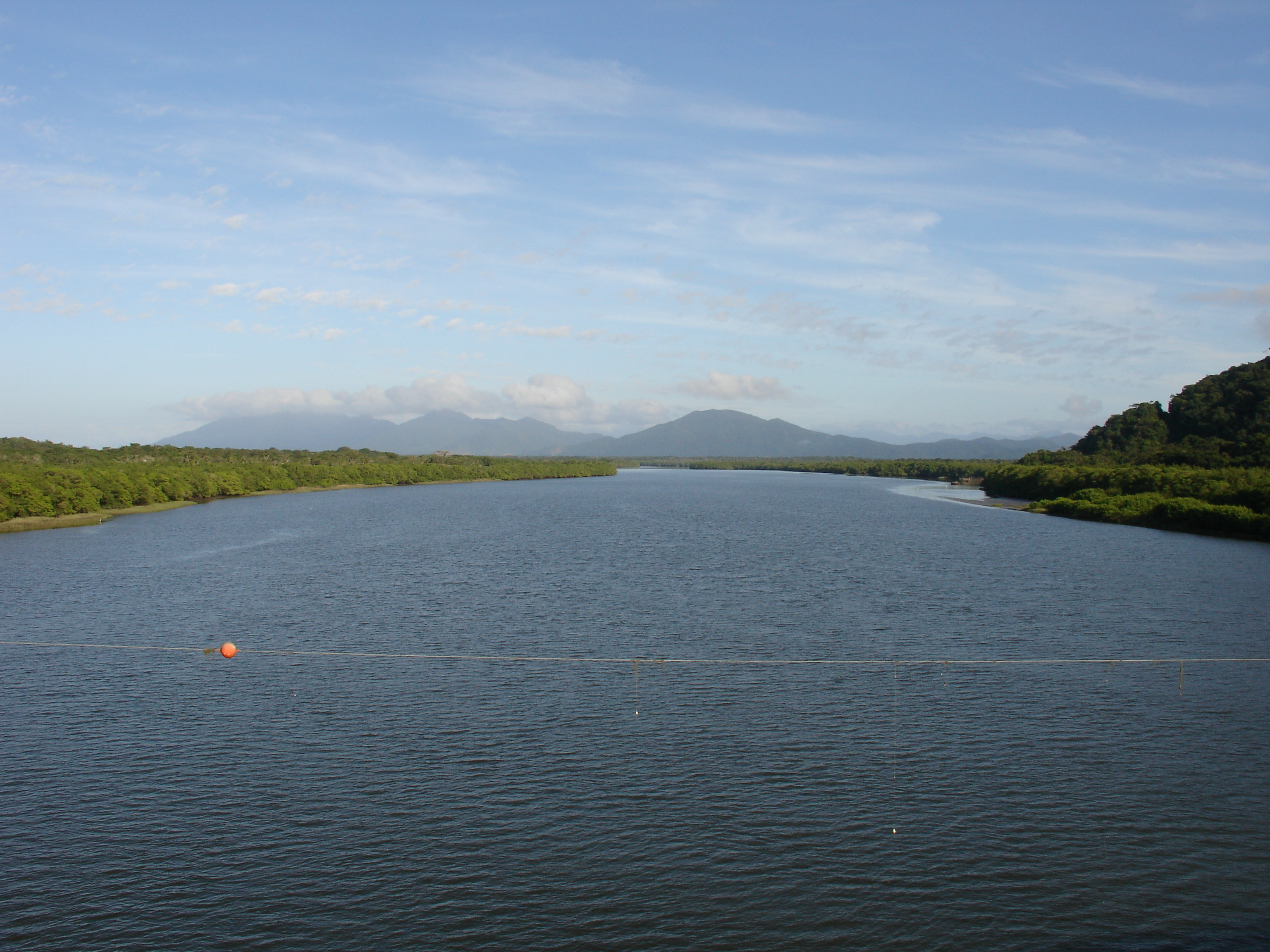
- Lagamar de Cananeia State Park

- Location within Brazil
- Location: São Paulo state, Southeastern Brazil
- Coordinates: 24.869284°S 48.349828°W
- Area: 243,885.78 hectares (602,654.9 acres)
- Designation: Protected area mosaic
- Created: 21 February 2008

The Jacupiranga Mosaic (Portuguese: Mosaico do Jacupiranga) is a protected area mosaic of 14 units, located in the Atlantic Forest biome within the state of São Paulo of southeastern Brazil.

It is centered on the former Jacupiranga State Park.

== History ==
The Jacupiranga Mosaic was created by state law 12.810 of 21 February 2008 with a total area of 243,885.78 hectares (602,654.9 acres), including 14 conservation units and 2 planned Private natural heritage reserves. It was the fifth mosaic to be created in Brazil, and was intended to reconcile sustainable economic development with conservation objectives. The Jacupiranga State Park, which had an area of 140,000 hectares (350,000 acres), was expanded to 154,872.17 hectares (382,697.5 acres) and subdivided into three state parks, Caverna do Diabo, Rio Turvo and Lagamar de Cananéia.

The law created five sustainable development reserves and one extractive reserve, totaling 13,793.32 hectares (34,084.0 acres) and four environmental protection areas totaling 73,558.09 hectares (181,766.0 acres). The remaining residents in the Caverna do Diabo, Rio Turvo and Lagamar Cananéia state parks were to be relocated to the sustainable use units, so the forest remnants could be protected..

== Conservation units ==
The Jacupiranga Mosaic includes the following conservation units:

Type	Name	Municipality(s)	Size (ha)
State park	Caverna do Diabo	Barra do Turvo, Eldorado, Iporanga, Cajati	40,219.66
State park	Rio Turvo	Barra do Turvo, Cajati, Jacupiranga	73,893.87
State park	Lagamar de Cananéia	Cananéia, Jacupiranga	40,758.64
Sustainable development reserve	Barreiro/Anhemas	Barra do Turvo	3,175.07
Sustainable development reserve	Quilombos de Barra do Turvo	Barra do Turvo	5,826.46
Sustainable development reserve	Pinheirinhos	Barra do Turvo	1,531.09
Sustainable development reserve	Lavras	Cajati	889.74
Sustainable development reserve	Itapanhapima	Cananéia	1,242.70
Extractive reserve	Ilha do Tumba	Cananéia	1,128.26
Extractive reserve	Taquari	Cananéia	1,662.20
Environmental protection area	Planalto do Turvo	Barra do Turvo, Cajati	2,721.87
Environmental protection area	Cajati	Cajati	2,975.71
Environmental protection area	Rio Pardinho e Rio Vermelho	Barra do Turvo	3,235.47
Environmental protection area	Quilombos do Médio Ribeira	Iporanga, Barra do Turvo, Eldorado	64,625.04

== See also ==
- Atlantic Forest
- Protected area mosaics of Brazil

== Notes ==
=== Sources ===
- Lino, Clayton Ferreira (May 2009), Mosaico de Unidades de Conservação do Jacupiranga (PDF) (in Portuguese), São Paulo: Conselho Nacional da Reserva da Biosfera da Mata Atlântica, archived from the original (PDF) on 2010-12-02
- Paixão, Carolina Araujo da (2009), Parque Estadual do Rio Turvo: Um estudo sobre a percepção e interpretação ambiental da comunidade moradora do entorno da BR 116 (PDF), Rio Claro (SP): UEP Instituto de Geociências e Ciências Exatas
- Zanchetta, Inês; Bedeschi, Luciana (28 February 2008), Mosaico do Jacupiranga, no Vale do Ribeira, agora é lei (in Portuguese), ISA: Instituto Socioambiental, archived from the original on 2016-11-21
