= Bacia do Rio Macacu Environmental Protection Area =

Brazilian environmental protection area

- Área de Proteção Ambiental da Bacia do Rio Macacu
- IUCN category V (protected landscape/seascape)
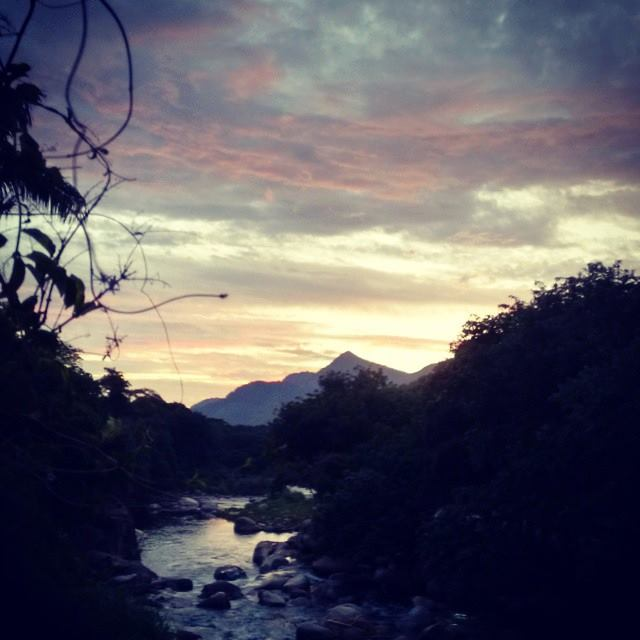
- Rio Macacu at Valério

- Location within Brazil
- Nearest city: Cachoeiras de Macacu, Rio de Janeiro
- Coordinates: 22.501050°S 42.750382°W
- Area: 19,508 hectares (48,210 acres)
- Designation: Environmental protection area
- Created: 5 December 2002

The Bacia do Rio Macacu Environmental Protection Area (Portuguese: Área de Proteção Ambiental da Bacia do Rio Macacu) is an environmental protection area in the state of Rio de Janeiro, Brazil.

== Location ==
The Bacia do Rio Macacu Environmental Protection Area (APA) covers parts of the municipalities of Cachoeiras de Macacu, Itaboraí and Guapimirim in Rio de Janeiro. It has an area of 19,508 hectares (48,210 acres). It includes areas of plains and lowlands and mountainous areas with springs and important remnants of forest. Its largest area is occupied by pastures, vegetable fields and quarries for sand to be used in construction.

The Guapimirim-Macacu sub-basin is part of the Guanabara Bay basin. It is bounded to the north and northwest by the Serra dos Órgãos, to the northeast by the Serra de Macaé de Cima, to the east by the Serra da Botija and the Serra de Monte Azul, and to the south by the Serra do Sambê and the Serra dos Garcias. The Macacu River, the main river of the APA, is born in the Serra dos Órgãos at about 1,700 metres (5,600 ft) in the municipality of Cachoeiras de Macacu, and runs for about 74 kilometres (46 mi) to its junction with the Guapimirim River.

Protected areas near the APA include the Serra dos Órgãos National Park with 11,800 hectares (29,000 acres), Três Picos State Park with 46,350 hectares (114,500 acres), Paraíso Ecological Station (Note: In 2013 the Paraíso Ecological Station was integrated into the Três Picos State Park.) with 4,920 hectares (12,200 acres), Guapimirim Environmental Protection Area with 14,000 hectares (35,000 acres) and Petrópolis Environmental Protection Area with 59,049 hectares (145,910 acres). Most of these were created to protect springs and headwaters in the forested mountains as well as biodiversity.

== History ==
The Bacia do Rio Macacu Environmental Protection Area was created by state law 4.018 of 5 December 2002. Its objective is to protect marginal areas in the basin of the Macacu River, the largest contributor to Guanabara Bay. It is included in the Central Rio de Janeiro Atlantic Forest Mosaic, created in December 2006. The management plan was prepared in 2009 by the Brazilian Agricultural Research Corporation (Embrapa) in cooperation with other institutions, within a regional planning strategy for the mosaic which considered opportunities for forming corridors between the protected areas and for ecologically sound agriculture.

== Sources ==
- APA da Bacia do Rio Macacu (in Portuguese), INEA: Instituto estadual do ambiente, archived from the original on 2016-10-10
- Centro de Primatologia do Rio de Janeiro (CPRJ) (in Portuguese), INEA, archived from the original on 2016-10-03
- Costa, Cláudia; Lamas, Ivana; Fernandes, Rosan (December 2010), Planejamento Estratégico do Mosaico Central Fluminense (PDF) (in Portuguese), Reserva da Biosfera da Mata Atlântica, archived from the original (PDF) on 2016-10-07
- Entre serras e águas: consolidação do corredor central fluminense por meio da elaboração do plano de manejo da APA da Bacia do Rio Macacu (in Portuguese), Embrapa
- RJ - Cachoeiras de Macacu (in Portuguese), MMA: Ministério do Meio Ambiente
