= Guapi-Guapiaçú Environmental Protection Area =

- Área de Proteção Ambiental Guapi-Guapiaçú
- IUCN category V (protected landscape/seascape)
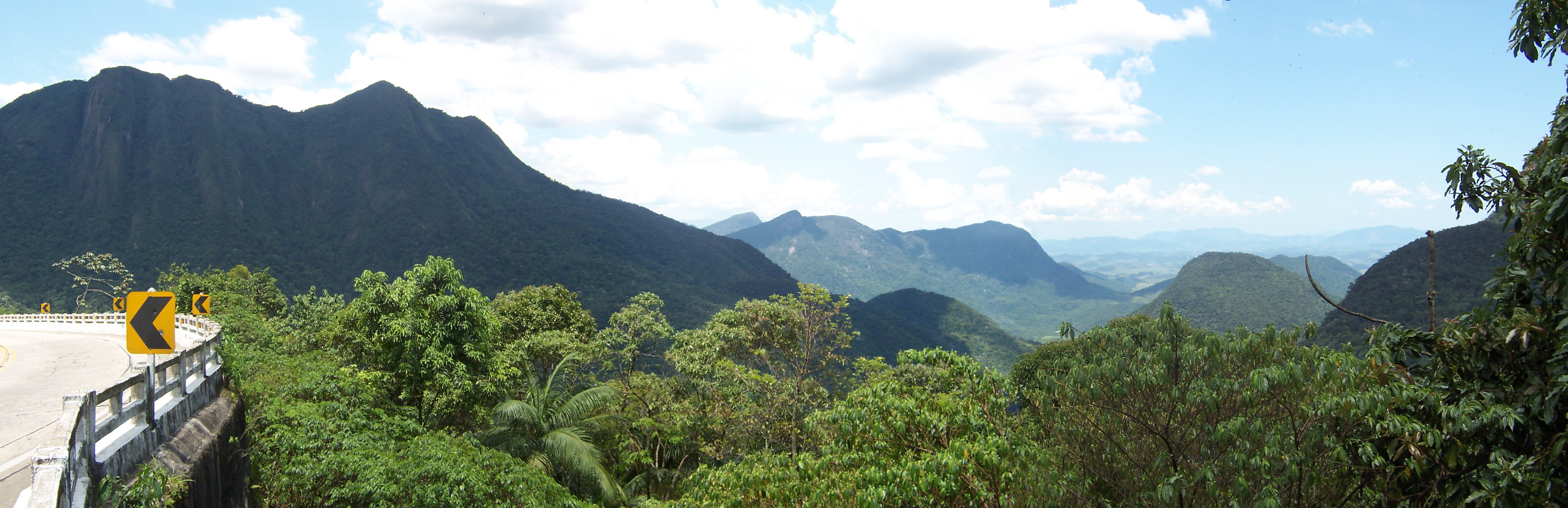
- Panorama of Guapimirim

- Location within Brazil
- Nearest city: Guapimirim, Rio de Janeiro
- Coordinates: 22.587391°S 42.940191°W
- Area: 15,582 hectares (38,500 acres)
- Designation: Environmental protection area
- Created: 22 December 2004
- Administrator: Secretaria Municipal de Meio Ambiente de Guapimirim

The Guapi-Guapiaçú Environmental Protection Area (Portuguese: Área de Proteção Ambiental Guapi-Guapiaçú) is a municipally-operated environmental protection area in the state of Rio de Janeiro, Brazil.

== Location ==
The Guapi-Guapiaçú Environmental Protection Area (APA) is contained in the municipality of Guapimirim, Rio de Janeiro. It has an area of 15,582 hectares (38,500 acres). It is bounded to the north by the Petrópolis Environmental Protection Area and the Três Picos State Park, to the east by the Paraíso Ecological Station (Note: The Paraíso Ecological Station was integrated into the Três Picos State Park in 2013. The primatology center continued operation in its original area.), the Guapiaçú River and the municipality of Itaboraí and to the south by the Guapimirim Environmental Protection Area. To the west it is bounded by the town of Guapimirim and associated communities.

The APA has low population density. 2,156.19 hectares (5,328.1 acres), or 14.77%, is designated for permanent protection. Of this, 1,538.58 hectares (3,801.9 acres), or 71.36% of the permanently protected area, is not covered by natural vegetation. Most of the natural vegetation is várzea forest, but the APA contains significant remnants of submontane and montane Atlantic Forest. It connects the mangroves to the alpine meadows and high montane forests, forms a corridor between the five conservation units that are partly located in the municipality of Guapimirim, and helps to control occupation and land use of the area.

Potential threats are uncontrolled urban and industrial expansion due to low agricultural use, deforestation, trafficking in wildlife and hunting. On the positive side, the low agricultural use may provide the opportunity for reforestation.

== History ==
The Guapi-Guapiaçú Environmental Protection Area was created by municipal decree 620 of 22 December 2004. It is administered by the municipal department of the environment. The APA was created to form an ecological corridor integrated with the Guapimirim Environmental Protection Area, Petrópolis Environmental Protection Area, Serra dos Órgãos National Park, Três Picos State Park and Paraíso Ecological Station, home of the Rio de Janeiro Primatology Center. It aims to encourage sustainability in the communities in the APA through promoting development of ecotourism, agrotourism, agroecology, aquaculture, scientific research and environmental education. It is in the Central Rio de Janeiro Atlantic Forest Mosaic, created in 2006.

== Sources ==
- Área de Proteção Ambiental Guapi-Guapiaçú (PDF) (in Portuguese), RBMA: Reserva da Biosfera da Mata Atlântica
- Centro de Primatologia do Rio de Janeiro (CPRJ) (in Portuguese), INEA
- Pedreira, Bernadete da Conceição C.G.; Cardoso Fidalgo, Elaine Cristina; Camardelli Uzeda, Mariella; Alves da Costa, Michell Douglas (December 2011), "Áreas Prioritárias para Recuperação na Região da Bacia Hidrográfica do Rio Guapi-Macacu, RJ" (PDF), Boletim de Pesquisa e Desenvolvimento (in Portuguese), ISSN 1678-0892
- Costa, Cláudia; Lamas, Ivana; Fernandes, Rosan (December 2010), Planejamento Estratégico do Mosaico Central Fluminense (PDF) (in Portuguese), Reserva da Biosfera da Mata Atlântica, archived from the original (PDF) on 2016-10-07
