= Lagamar de Cananéia State Park =

State Park in São Paulo, Brazil

- Parque Estadual do Lagamar de Cananéia
- IUCN category II (national park)
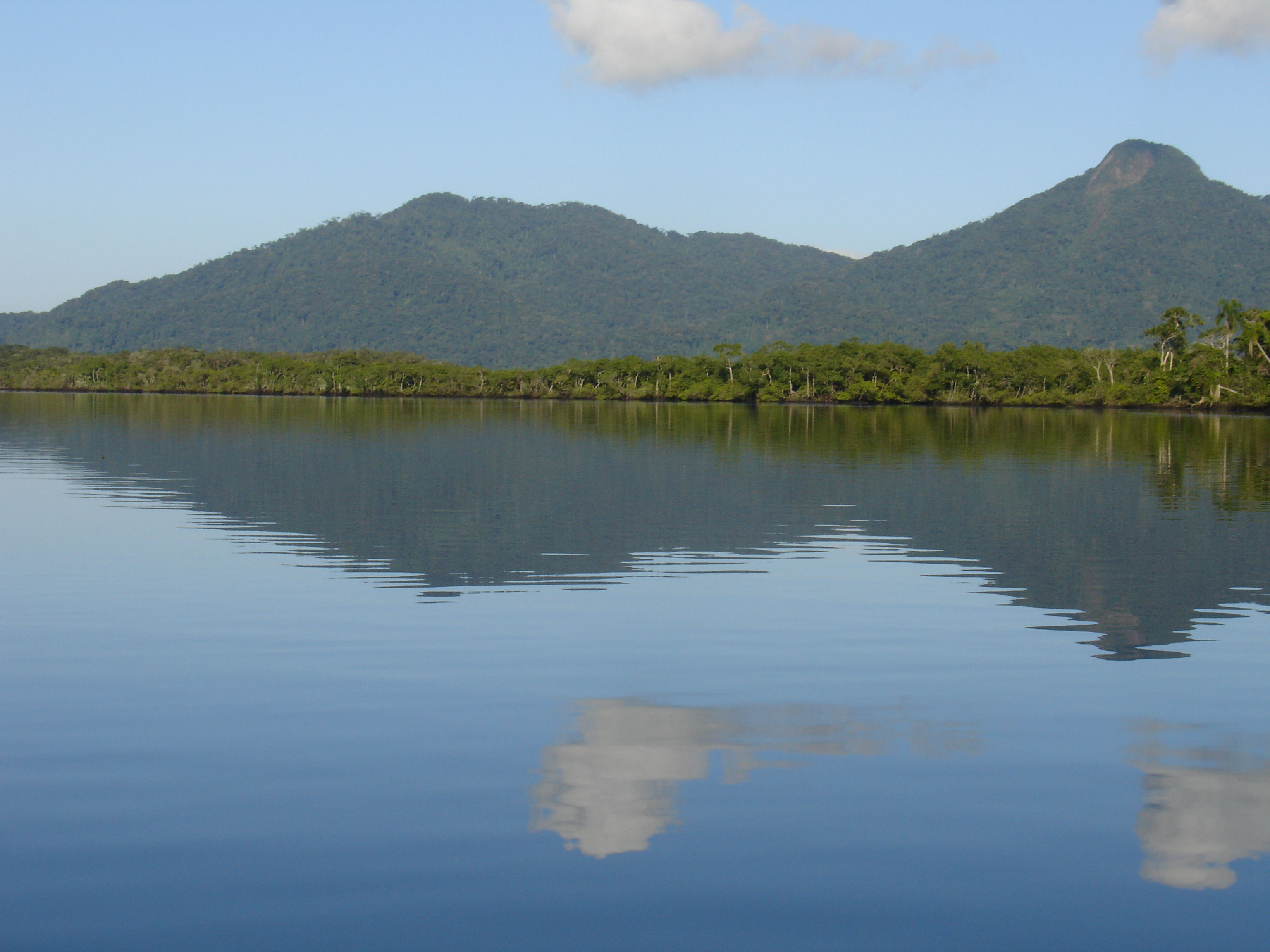
- Lagamar de Cananéia State Park

- Location within Brazil
- Nearest city: Cananéia, São Paulo
- Coordinates: 25.014018°S 48.168643°W
- Area: 40,759 hectares (100,720 acres)
- Designation: State park
- Created: 21 February 2008
- Administrator: Fundação Florestal SP

The Lagamar de Cananéia State Park (Portuguese: Parque Estadual do Lagamar de Cananéia) is a state park in the state of São Paulo, Brazil.

== Location ==
The Lagamar de Cananéia State Park is in the municipalities of Cananéia and Jacupiranga, São Paulo. It has an area of 40,759 hectares (100,720 acres). The park is in the Vale do Ribeira region, and holds part of the Iguape-Cananéia-Paranaguá estuary lagoon complex, one of the largest breeding grounds for South Atlantic marine species. It was recognized by UNESCO as a core zone of Atlantic Forest Biosphere Reserve, and a natural World Heritage Site. Tucuxi (Sotalia fluviatilis) dolphins are often seen in the estuary complex. The Superagui lion tamarin (Leontopithecus caissara) was found in the south sector of the park in 1990, a critically endangered species endemic to the region.

== History ==
The Lagamar de Cananéia State Park is one of several conservation units created by state law 12.810 of 21 February 2008, in which the Jacupiranga Mosaic was created from the former Jacupiranga State Park and its surrounding lands. The park is a fully protected conservation unit. Objectives include preservation of ecosystems and genetic diversity, and support of scientific research, environmental education and ecotourism. As of 2015, access to the park was restricted to researchers, although there were plans to open to the public. As of 2022, according to São Paulo's Guide to Protected Areas, the park is now open to the public every day from 8 AM to 5 PM.

== Sources ==
- PES do Lagamar de Cananéia (in Portuguese), ISA: Instituto Socioambiental
- Sobre o Parque (in Portuguese), SAP: Sistema Ambiental Paulista, archived from the original on 2016-11-13
- Zanchetta, Inês; Bedeschi, Luciana (28 February 2008), Mosaico do Jacupiranga, no Vale do Ribeira, agora é lei (in Portuguese), ISA: Instituto Socioambiental, archived from the original on 2016-11-21
- Zanelli, Maria Lúcia (26 April 2015), "Turismo: Lagamar, onde o boto é rei", SintoniaSP (in Portuguese)
