= Turvo River (Pardo River tributary) =

- Location within Brazil
- Native name: Rio Turvo (Portuguese)

Location
- Country: Brazil

Physical characteristics
- Mouth
  - coordinates: 24.753824°S 48.506979°W

The Turvo River (Portuguese: Rio Turvo) is a river in the state of São Paulo, Brazil. It joins the Pardo River in the town of Barra do Turvo. The Pardo is in turn a tributary of the Ribeira de Iguape River.

The Rio Turvo State Park is named after the river, which has several waterfalls and rapids along its course through the park. The Barreiro/Anhemas Sustainable Development Reserve lies on the right bank of the river.

== See also ==
- List of rivers of São Paulo
