= Taquari Extractive Reserve =

- Reserva Extrativista Taquari
- IUCN category VI (protected area with sustainable use of natural resources)
- Location within Brazil
- Location: Cananéia, São Paulo
- Coordinates: 25.042892°S 48.033434°W
- Area: 1,662 hectares (4,110 acres)
- Designation: Extractive reserve
- Created: 21 February 2008

The Taquari Extractive Reserve (Portuguese: Reserva Extrativista Taquari) is an extractive reserve in the state of São Paulo, Brazil. It protects a coastal area of mangroves.

== Location ==
The Taquari Extractive Reserve is in the municipality of Cananéia, São Paulo. It has an area of 1,662 hectares (4,110 acres). The reserve covers an area of mangroves and salt water at the mouth of the Taquari River.

== History ==
The Taquari Extractive Reserve was created by state law 12.810 of 21 February 2008. This law broke up the old Jacupiranga State Park and created the Jacupiranga Mosaic with 14 conservation units.

== Sources ==
- RESEX Taquari (in Portuguese), ISA: Instituto Socioambiental
- RESEX Taquari (in Portuguese), SAP: Sistema Ambiental Paulista
- Zanchetta, Inês; Bedeschi, Luciana (28 February 2008), Mosaico do Jacupiranga, no Vale do Ribeira, agora é lei (in Portuguese), ISA: Instituto Socioambiental, archived from the original on 2016-11-21
