= Quilombos de Barra do Turvo Sustainable Development Reserve =

- Reserva de Desenvolvimento Sustentável dos Quilombos de Barra do Turvo
- IUCN category VI (protected area with sustainable use of natural resources)
- Location within Brazil
- Location: São Paulo state, Southeastern Brazil
- Nearest city: Barra do Turvo
- Coordinates: 24.926106°S 48.460261°W
- Area: 5,826 hectares (14,400 acres)
- Designation: Sustainable development reserve
- Created: 21 February 2008
- Administrator: Fundação Florestal SP

The Quilombos de Barra do Turvo Sustainable Development Reserve (Portuguese: Reserva de Desenvolvimento Sustentável dos Quilombos de Barra do Turvo) is a sustainable development reserve in the state of São Paulo and the Atlantic Forest ecoregion, in southeastern Brazil.

== Location ==
The Quilombos de Barra do Turvo Sustainable Development Reserve is in the municipality of Barra do Turvo, São Paulo. It has an area of 5,826 hectares (14,400 acres). It is formed by remnant Communities of Quilombos of Ribeirão Grande, Terra Seca, Cedro and Pedra Preta, distributed along BR-116 and SP-552.

== History ==
The Quilombos de Barra do Turvo Sustainable Development Reserve was created by state law 12.810 of 21 February 2008. This law broke up the old Jacupiranga State Park and created the Jacupiranga Mosaic with 14 conservation units. The reserve is administered by the state forest foundation (Fundação para Conservação e a Produção Florestal do Estado de São Paulo).

== Sources ==
- RDS dos Quilombos de Barra do Turvo (in Portuguese), ISA: Instituto Socioambiental
- RDS Quilombos de Barra do Turvo (in Portuguese), WWF Brasil, archived from the original on 2016-11-26
- Reserva de Desenvolvimento Sustentável – RDS – Estaduais (in Portuguese), Fundação Florestal SP
- Zanchetta, Inês; Bedeschi, Luciana (28 February 2008), Mosaico do Jacupiranga, no Vale do Ribeira, agora é lei (in Portuguese), ISA: Instituto Socioambiental, archived from the original on 2016-11-21
