= Cajati Environmental Protection Area =

Protected area in São Paulo, Brazil

- Área de Proteção Ambiental de Cajati
- IUCN category V (protected landscape/seascape)
- Location within Brazil
- Nearest city: Cajati, São Paulo
- Coordinates: 24.812378°S 48.253306°W
- Area: 2,976 hectares (7,350 acres)
- Designation: Environmental protection area
- Created: 21 February 2008
- Administrator: Fundação Florestal SP

The Cajati Environmental Protection Area (Portuguese: Área de Proteção Ambiental de Cajati) is an environmental protection area in the state of São Paulo, Brazil.

== Location ==
The Cajati Environmental Protection Area is in the municipality of Cajati, São Paulo. It has an area of 2,976 hectares (7,350 acres). It is in the Atlantic Forest biome, Vegetation is dense rainforest. Hunting, fishing and sale of land are prohibited.

== History ==
The Cajati Environmental Protection Area was created by state law 12.810 of 21 February 2008 with an area of 2,975.71 hectares (7,353.1 acres). This law broke up the old Jacupiranga State Park and created the Jacupiranga Mosaic with 14 conservational units.

== Sources ==
- APA de Cajati (PDF) (in Portuguese), Fundação Florestal SP, archived from the original (PDF) on 2016-11-27
- APA de Cajati (in Portuguese), ISA: Instituto Socioambiental
- Sobre a Área de Proteção (in Portuguese), SAP: Sistema Ambiental Paulista
- Zanchetta, Inês; Bedeschi, Luciana (28 February 2008), Mosaico do Jacupiranga, no Vale do Ribeira, agora é lei (in Portuguese), ISA: Instituto Socioambiental, archived from the original on 2016-11-21
