= Barreiro/Anhemas Sustainable Development Reserve =

Barreiro Anhemas Sustainable Development Reserve
- Reserva de Desenvolvimento Sustentável Barreiro Anhemas
- IUCN category VI (protected area with sustainable use of natural resources)
- Location within Brazil
- Nearest city: Barra do Turvo, São Paulo
- Coordinates: 24.801506°S 48.463347°W
- Area: 3,175 hectares (7,850 acres)
- Designation: Sustainable development reserve
- Created: 21 February 2008
- Administrator: Fundação Florestal SP

The Barreiro/Anhemas Sustainable Development Reserve (Portuguese: Reserva de Desenvolvimento Sustentável Barreiro Anhemas) is a sustainable development reserve in the state of São Paulo, Brazil.

== Location ==
The Barreiro/Anhemas Sustainable Development Reserve is in the municipality of Barra do Turvo, São Paulo. It has an area of 3,175 hectares (7,850 acres). The reserve is in the catchment area of the Turvo River, and lies on its right bank. It includes large areas of pasture, and areas with new types of use such as agroforestry. It supports several traditional families who were in the area before the Jacupiranga State Park was created, and did not move.

== History ==
The Barreiro/Anhemas Sustainable Development Reserve was created by state law 12.810 of 21 February 2008. This law broke up the old Jacupiranga State Park and created the Jacupiranga Mosaic with 14 conservation units. The reserve is administered by the state forest foundation (Fundação para Conservação e a Produção Florestal do Estado de São Paulo). As of 2016 it supported 176 families.

== Sources ==
- RDS Barreiro Anhemas (in Portuguese), ISA: Instituto Socioambiental
- RDS Barreiro Anhemas (in Portuguese), WWF Brasil, archived from the original on 2016-11-26
- Reserva de Desenvolvimento Sustentável – RDS – Estaduais (in Portuguese), Fundação Florestal SP
- Zanchetta, Inês; Bedeschi, Luciana (28 February 2008), Mosaico do Jacupiranga, no Vale do Ribeira, agora é lei (in Portuguese), ISA: Instituto Socioambiental, archived from the original on 2016-11-21
