= Lavras Sustainable Development Reserve =

- Reserva de Desenvolvimento Sustentável Lavras
- IUCN category VI (protected area with sustainable use of natural resources)
- Location within Brazil
- Location: São Paulo state, Southeastern Brazil
- Nearest city: Cajati
- Coordinates: 24.769786°S 48.242299°W
- Area: 889.74 hectares (2,198.6 acres)
- Designation: Sustainable development reserve
- Created: 21 February 2008
- Administrator: Fundação Florestal SP

The Lavras Sustainable Development Reserve (Portuguese: Reserva de Desenvolvimento Sustentável Lavras) is a sustainable development reserve in the Atlantic Forest biome and the state of São Paulo, Southeastern Brazil.

== Location ==
The Lavras Sustainable Development Reserve is in the Cajati municipality of São Paulo. It has an area of 889.74 hectares (2,198.6 acres), with four families. It covers the basin of the Lavras River, with about 50 tributaries. The landscape includes farmland and preserved forest. The Lavras waterfall could become a tourist attraction.

== History ==
The Lavras Sustainable Development Reserve was one of several conservation units created by state law 12.810 of 21 February 2008, in which the Jacupiranga Mosaic was created from the former Jacupiranga State Park and its surrounding lands. It was to support sustainable development of the existing traditional population and of others relocated there from the interior of the state parks. The utilization plan for the reserve was approved by its deliberative council on 20 August 2010. It was approved by the Forest Foundation on 12 December 2012.

== Economy ==
The Sítio Lavras is an example of a family plot, a 25.5 hectares (63 acres) site that contains 3 hectares (7.4 acres) of banana trees and a large amount of native forest in various stages of regeneration. The father works full time on the plot, and his son works there part time. The plot is a demonstration agroforestry project monitored by the Cajatí Agroforestry Group. In February 2014 residents of the neighborhood worked together to build a septic tank system for one of the ten families living in the reserve. Materials cost about R$150 for the sanitary system, which protects the water table from contamination, using a model already used on about 80 rural properties belonging to Cooperafloresta members in Barra do Turvo.

== Sources ==
- Comunidade faz mutirão para construir fossa séptica em bairro rural (in Portuguese), Jornal Regional, 7 March 2014
- Deitenbach, Armin; Melo Silva, Francisca Alcivânia de; Wiens, Ivy; Tatto, Nilto; Bim, Ocimar (October 2009), Fórum Desenvolvimento Agroflorestal e Serviços Ambientais no Vale do Ribeira (PDF) (in Portuguese), Comitê da Bacia Hidrográfica Ribeira de Iguape/Litoral Sul
- Francisco, Olavõ Reino (12 December 2012), Assunto: Aprova e divulga o Plano de Utilização da Reserva de Desenvolvimento Sustentável (RDS) de Lavras (PDF) (in Portuguese), Fundação Florestal
- Lino, Clayton Ferreira (May 2009), Mosaico de Unidades de Conservação do Jacupiranga (PDF) (in Portuguese), São Paulo: Conselho Nacional da Reserva da Biosfera da Mata Atlântica, archived from the original (PDF) on 2010-12-02
- RDS Lavras (in Portuguese), SAP: Sistema Ambiental Paulista
- Zanchetta, Inês; Bedeschi, Luciana (28 February 2008), Mosaico do Jacupiranga, no Vale do Ribeira, agora é lei (in Portuguese), ISA: Instituto Socioambiental, archived from the original on 2016-11-21
