= Planalto do Turvo Environmental Protection Area =

- IUCN category V (protected landscape/seascape)
- Location within Brazil
- Nearest city: Barra do Turvo, São Paulo
- Coordinates: 24.929740°S 48.309729°W
- Area: 2,722 hectares (6,730 acres)
- Designation: Environmental protection area
- Created: 21 February 2008
- Administrator: Fundação Florestal SP

The Planalto do Turvo Environmental Protection Area is an environmental protection area in the state of São Paulo, Brazil.

== Location ==
The Planalto do Turvo Environmental Protection Area (APA) is divided between the municipalities of Barra do Turvo (96.84%) and Cajati (3.16%) in the state of São Paulo. It has an area of 2,722 hectares (6,730 acres). It is in the Atlantic Forest biome. About 40% of the APA is covered by dense and mixed rainforest in various stages of succession.

== History ==
The Planalto do Turvo Environmental Protection Area was created by state law 12.810 of 21 February 2008. This law broke up the old Jacupiranga State Park and created the Jacupiranga Mosaic with 14 conservation units.

== Economy ==
There are 374 families resident in the APA, mostly migrants from other regions but some long-established. The soil is relatively infertile, and the main economic activity is raising cattle for beef and milk. There is some infrastructure along highway BR-116 such as small businesses, a school and a health center.

== Sources ==
- APA do Planalto do Turvo (in Portuguese), ISA: Instituto Socioambiental
- Dominiquini, Débora Baboni (2012), "Análise socioeconômica e ambiental das populações tradicionais da Reserva de Desenvolvimento Sustentável (RDS) dos Quilombos de Barra do Turvo e Área de Proteção Ambiental (APA) do Planalto do Turvo, Mosaico de Jacupiranga/SP", Dissertation (in Portuguese), Universidade Estadual Paulista Júlio de Mesquita Filho, Instituto de Biociências de Rio Claro, hdl:11449/118912
- Sobre a Área de Proteção (in Portuguese), SAP: Sistema Ambiental Paulista
- Zanchetta, Inês; Bedeschi, Luciana (28 February 2008), Mosaico do Jacupiranga, no Vale do Ribeira, agora é lei (in Portuguese), ISA: Instituto Socioambiental
