= Rio Pardinho e Rio Vermelho Environmental Protection Area =

Environmental protection area in São Paulo, Brazil

- Área de Proteção Ambiental do Rio Pardinho e do Rio Vermelho
- IUCN category V (protected landscape/seascape)
- Location within Brazil
- Nearest city: Barra do Turvo, São Paulo
- Coordinates: 25.052738°S 48.553125°W
- Area: 3,235 hectares (7,990 acres)
- Designation: Environmental protection area
- Created: 21 February 2008
- Administrator: Fundação Florestal SP

The Rio Pardinho e Rio Vermelho Environmental Protection Area (Portuguese: Área de Proteção Ambiental do Rio Pardinho e do Rio Vermelho) is an environmental protection area in the state of São Paulo, Brazil.

== Location ==
The Rio Pardinho e Rio Vermelho Environmental Protection Area (APA) is in the municipality of Barra do Turvo, São Paulo. It has an area of 3,235 hectares (7,990 acres). It is in the Atlantic Forest biome, originally covered by dense rainforest.

== History ==
The Rio Pardinho e Rio Vermelho Environmental Protection Area was created by state law 12.810 of 21 February 2008. This law broke up the old Jacupiranga State Park and created the Jacupiranga Mosaic with 14 conservation units. The APA is administered by the São Paulo Forestry Foundation (Fundação para Conservação e a Produção Florestal do Estado de São Paulo).

== Sources ==
- APA do Rio Pardinho e do Rio Vermelho (in Portuguese), ISA: Instituto Socioambiental
- APA Rio Pardinho e Rio Vermelho (in Portuguese), WWF Brasil
- Sobre a Área de Proteção (in Portuguese), SAP: Sistema Ambiental Paulista
- Zanchetta, Inês; Bedeschi, Luciana (28 February 2008), Mosaico do Jacupiranga, no Vale do Ribeira, agora é lei (in Portuguese), ISA: Instituto Socioambiental, archived from the original on 2016-11-21
