= Barra do Rio Mamanguape Environmental Protection Area =

Protected area in the Mamanguape River in Paraíba, Brazil

- Área de Proteção Ambiental Barra do Rio Mamanguape
- IUCN category V (protected landscape/seascape)
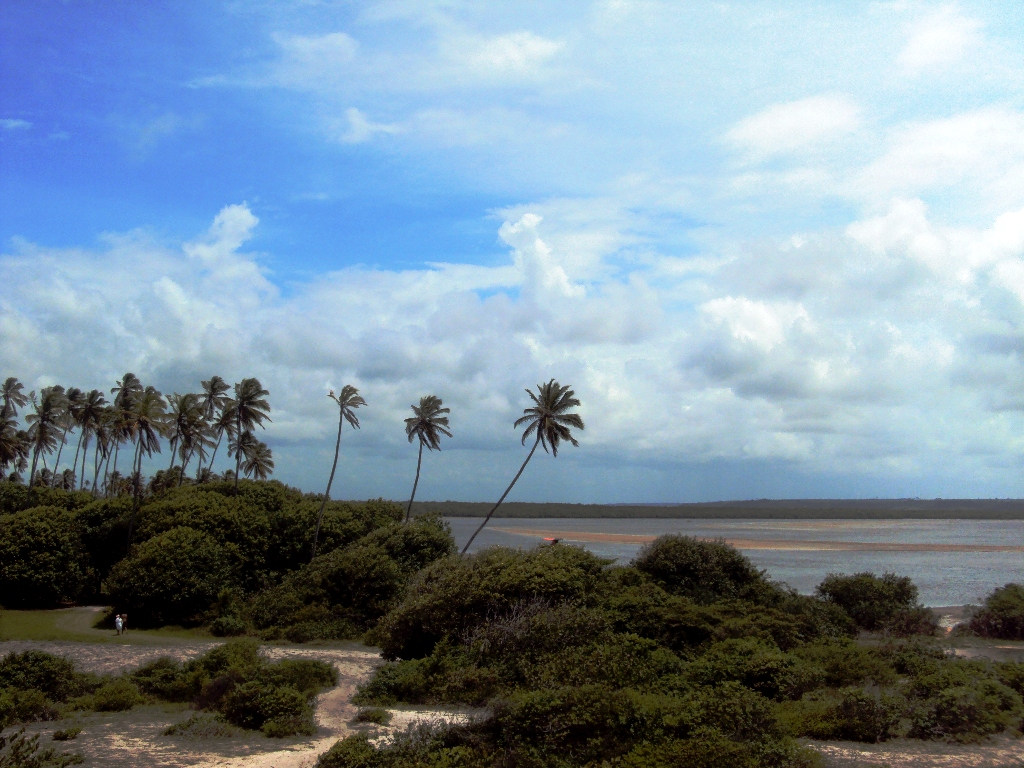
- Overview of the protected area

- Location within Brazil
- Location: State of Paraíba, Northeastern Brazil
- Nearest city: Mamanguape
- Coordinates: 6.77°S 34.930°W
- Area: 14,640 hectares (36,200 acres)
- Designation: Environmental Protection Area
- Established: 10 September 1993

Barra do Rio Mamanguape Environmental Protection Area (Portuguese: Área de Proteção Ambiental Barra do Rio Mamanguape) is a protected area of 14,640 hectares in the estuary of the Mamanguape River in the state of Paraíba, Brazil.

== Foundation ==
There was a drive to develop sugar cane plantations in the region in the 1970s. The resulting massive loss of Atlantic Forest created pressure to use the mangroves in the Mamanguape River estuary as wood for construction, despite the poor quality of the wood and the value of the mangroves as shelter for crabs, clams, oysters and fish. The coastal marine protected area, which has an area of 14,640 hectares (36,200 acres), was finally established on 10 September 1993. It is administered by the Chico Mendes Institute for Biodiversity Conservation.

The area includes parts of the Baía da Traição, Lucena, Marcação and Rio Tinto municipalities of Paraíba. It is IUCN protected area category V (protected landscape/seascape). The overall purpose is to control land use, protect biodiversity and ensure sustainable use of natural resources. Specific objectives include conserving the habitat of the West Indian manatee (Trichechus manatus), conserving the remaining mangrove and rainforest, and promoting eco-tourism.

== Environment ==
The Barra do Rio Mamanguape is a relatively secluded area on the north coast of Paraiba with sandy beaches, dunes, reefs and well-preserved mangroves. It is the main area where the manatee is found, and the main breeding area. The area contains remnants of the Atlantic Forest biome. Its importance is linked to its estuary ecosystem, which includes the manatee, species highly threatened in the area.

== Sources ==
- APA da Barra do Rio Mamanguape (in Portuguese), Chico Mendes Institute for Biodiversity Conservation, archived from the original on 2016-03-03
- Danielle Paludo; Vicente Stanislaw Klonowski (1999), BARRA DE MAMANGUAPE - PB Estudo do impacto do uso de madeira de manguezal pela população extrativista e da possibilidade de reflorestamento e manejo dos recursos madeireiros (PDF), São Paulo: Conselho Nacional da Reserva da Biosfera da Mata Atlântica, archived from the original (PDF) on 2010-12-02
- Unidade de Conservação: Área de Proteção Ambiental Barra do Rio Mamanguape (in Portuguese), MMA: Ministério do Meio Ambiente
