= Pinheirinhos Sustainable Development Reserve =

- Reserva de Desenvolvimento Sustentável Pinheirinhos
- IUCN category VI (protected area with sustainable use of natural resources)
- Location within Brazil
- Location: São Paulo state, Southeastern Brazil
- Nearest city: Barra do Turvo
- Coordinates: 24.970549°S 48.556935°W
- Area: 1,530.01 hectares (3,780.7 acres)
- Designation: Sustainable development reserve
- Created: 21 February 2008
- Administrator: Fundação Florestal SP

The Pinheirinhos Sustainable Development Reserve (Portuguese: Reserva de Desenvolvimento Sustentável Pinheirinhos) is a sustainable development reserve in the Atlantic Forest biome and the state of São Paulo, Southeastern Brazil.

== Location ==
The Pinheirinhos Sustainable Development Reserve is in the municipality of Barra do Turvo, São Paulo. It has an area of 1,530.01 hectares (3,780.7 acres). The reserve is for the use of three traditional communities with 60 families on the border with the state of Paraná. The reserve collaborates with the Agroforestry Project for Community Development and Conservation of the Atlantic Forest developed by Cooperafloresta in the Vale do Ribeira region, which aims to improve agroforestry practice and to support 112 families.

== History ==
The Pinheirinhos Sustainable Development Reserve was created by state law 12.810 of 21 February 2008. This law broke up the old Jacupiranga State Park and created the Jacupiranga Mosaic with 14 conservation units. It is administered by the state forest foundation (Fundação para Conservação e a Produção Florestal do Estado de São Paulo). In April 2011 residents of the community of Pinheirinhos das Dúvidas in the reserve, with 30 families, still had no electric power supply despite being registered since 2008 under the Luz para Todos program. The power company said work would start soon.
