= Serra de Tabatinga Environmental Protection Area =

Protected area of Brazil

- Área de Proteção Ambiental da Serra de Tabatinga
- IUCN category V (protected landscape/seascape)
- Location within Brazil
- Nearest city: Palmas, Tocantins, Brazil
- Coordinates: 10°18′40″S 45°48′43″W
- Area: 35,185 hectares (86,940 acres)
- Designation: Environmental Protection Area
- Created: 6 June 1990

Serra de Tabatinga Environmental Protection Area (Portuguese: Área de Proteção Ambiental da Serra de Tabatinga) is a protected area in the states of Tocantins and Maranhão, Brazil. It is in the Cerrado biome.

== Location ==
The Serra de Tabatinga Environmental Protection Area in the Cerrado biome, which covers 35,185 hectares (86,940 acres), was created on 6 June 1990. It is administered by the Chico Mendes Institute for Biodiversity Conservation. It is in the municipality of Barreiras in the state of Piauí.

== Conservation ==
The area is classed as IUCN protected area category V, protected landscape/seascape. The purpose is to protect biological diversity, control human occupation and ensure the sustainable use of natural resources. Specifically, the unit was created to protect the headwaters of the Parnaíba River to ensure water quality.

== Sources ==
- Área de Proteção Ambiental da Serra de Tabatinga (in Portuguese), Chico Mendes Institute for Biodiversity Conservation
- Área de Proteção Ambiental Serra da Tabatinga (in Portuguese), Via Rural, archived from the original on October 30, 2009
- Unidade de Conservação: Área de Proteção Ambiental da Serra de Tabatinga (in Portuguese), MMA: Ministério do Meio Ambiente
