= Rio Turvo State Park =

State Park in São Paulo, Brazil

- Parque Estadual Rio Turvo
- IUCN category II (national park)
- Location within Brazil
- Nearest city: Barra do Turvo, São Paulo
- Coordinates: 24.862873°S 48.287228°W
- Area: 73,893.87 hectares (182,595.7 acres)
- Designation: State park
- Created: 21 February 2008
- Administrator: Fundação Florestal SP

The Rio Turvo State Park (Portuguese: Parque Estadual Rio Turvo) is a state park in the state of São Paulo, Brazil. It protects an area of Atlantic Forest. A man's skeleton from 9,000 years ago was found in the park area in 1999.

== Location ==
The Rio Turvo State Park is in the municipalities of Barra do Turvo (69.93%), Cajati (16.45%) and Jacupiranga (13.62%) of São Paulo. It has an area of 73,893.87 hectares (182,595.7 acres). Several communities of traditional populations live in the area around the park.

== History ==
The Rio Turvo State Park was one of several conservation units created by state law 12.810 of 21 February 2008, in which the Jacupiranga Mosaic was created from the former Jacupiranga State Park and its surrounding lands. By 2012 about 11,000 people were visiting the park each year. On 28 November 2012 the park officially opened a Thematic Exhibition Center at the Capelinha Center. The building cost about RS$639,800, using funds provided in compensation for construction of a toll road in the area.

== Environment ==
The Rio Turvo State Park is in the Ribeira de Iguape River basin. The park is named after the Turvo River, one of the main tributaries of the Ribeira de Iguape. The river has several waterfalls and rapids along its course. Altitudes are 600 to 2,000 metres (2,000 to 6,600 ft). The park is in the Atlantic Forest biome. The vegetation is dense montane rainforest in various stages of regeneration, always green, with many epiphytes. It has a uniform canopy of about 20 metres (66 ft) with emergent trees up to 40 metres (130 ft). There are some areas of transition to cultivated areas with small settlements in capoeira areas. Flora include Cinnamon, Euterpe edulis, Ficus, Syagrus romanzoffiana and Araucaria angustifolia. There is a diverse fauna of invertebrates, amphibians, reptiles, birds and mammals. Endangered species include the vinaceous-breasted amazon (Amazona vinacea) and jaguar (Panthera onca).

== Luzio ==
The park contains an archaeological site that holds a human fossil about 9,000 years old, thought to be the oldest relic of human occupation in the state. The fossilized skeleton of a man was found in 1999 close by the Exhibition Center, and was transferred to the Museum of Archeology and Ethnology of the University of São Paulo in 2000. It was nicknamed Luzio, a reference to the 11,000-year-old skeleton of Luzia found in Belo Horizonte that is thought to be the oldest in the Americas. The location where Luzio was found may have been a cemetery, where bodies were covered in a layer of shells. These shell mounds, or Sambaquis, are common in the region.

== Visitor attractions ==
The park has three centers, Capelinha, Serra do Cadeado and Cedro. The Capelinha Center holds the Capelinha Museum, thematic exhibitions about aspects of the park and the region, and models of Atlantic Forest animals. Attractions include the Mirante do Aleixo, a look-out at 1,100 metres (3,600 ft) above sea level above the city of Cajati and the hills of the park, the Cachoeira do Azeite, a waterfall at the source of the Azeite River, the Gruta da Capelinha and the Cachoeira and Andorinhas trails. The Gruta da Capelinha was the hiding place of Captain Carlos Lamarca and his 16 guerrillas of the Popular Revolutionary Vanguard (VRP) in 1969. The BR-116 highway runs through the center of the park for 60 kilometres (37 mi), with steady traffic day and night. Some of the local people sell forest products beside the highway, including wild animals, palmito jussara (Euterpe edulis) and hardwoods. They are resident in the park, although technically they should have been resettled when the Jacupiranga State Park was formed in 1969.

== Sources ==
- Paixão, Carolina Araujo da (2009), Parque Estadual do Rio Turvo: Um estudo sobre a percepção e interpretação ambiental da comunidade moradora do entorno da BR 116 (PDF), Rio Claro (SP): UEP Instituto de Geociências e Ciências Exatas
- Parque Estadual Rio Turvo inaugura Centro de Exposições Temático no Núcleo Capelinha (in Portuguese), Fundação Florestal SP, 27 November 2012
- PES do Rio Turvo (in Portuguese), ISA: Instituto Socioambiental
- Sobre o parque (in Portuguese), SAP: Sistema Ambiental Paulista, archived from the original on 2015-12-22
- Zanchetta, Inês; Bedeschi, Luciana (28 February 2008), Mosaico do Jacupiranga, no Vale do Ribeira, agora é lei (in Portuguese), ISA: Instituto Socioambiental, archived from the original on 2016-11-21
