= Bacia dos Frades Environmental Protection Area =

Area in the state of Rio de Janeiro, Brazil

- Área de Proteção Ambiental Bacia dos Frades
- IUCN category VI (protected area with sustainable use of natural resources)
- Location within Brazil
- Nearest city: Teresópolis, Rio de Janeiro
- Coordinates: 22.343124°S 42.769763°W
- Area: 7,500 hectares (19,000 acres)
- Designation: Environmental protection area
- Created: 27 November 1990

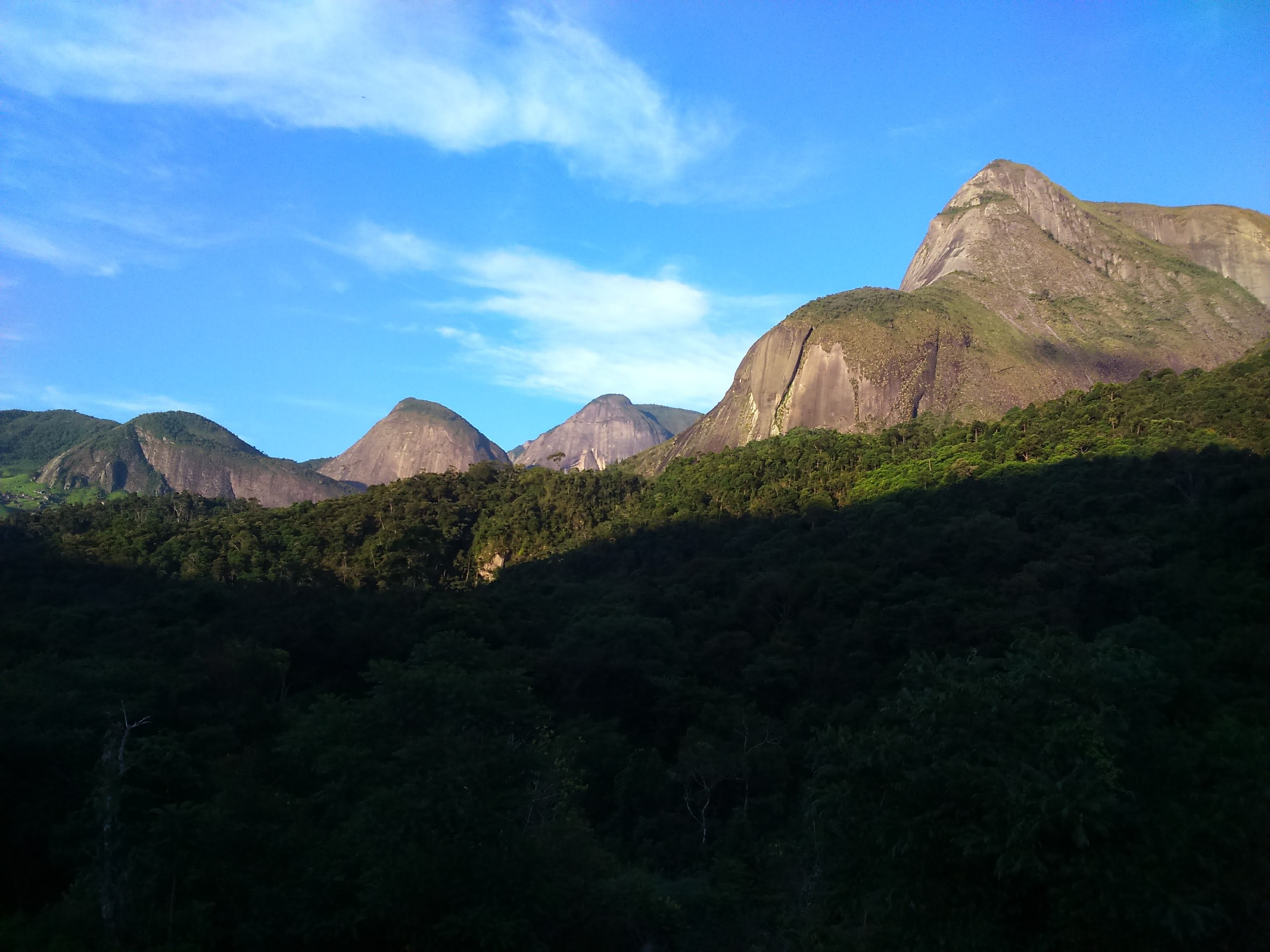

The Bacia dos Frades Environmental Protection Area (Portuguese: Área de Proteção Ambiental Bacia dos Frades) is an environmental protection area in the state of Rio de Janeiro, Brazil.

== Location ==
The Bacia dos Frades Environmental Protection Area (APA) is in the municipality of Teresópolis, Rio de Janeiro. It has an area of 7,500 hectares (19,000 acres).

== History ==
The Bacia dos Frades Environmental Protection Area was created by state law 1.755 of 27 November 1990. It had an area of 6,882.14 hectares (17,006.1 acres). The APA was included in the Central Rio de Janeiro Atlantic Forest Mosaic, created in 2006. On 31 October 2013 state law 6.573 extinguished the Paraíso Ecological Station and the Floresta do Jacarandá Environmental Protection Area, and modified the Bacia dos Frades Environmental Protection Area and the Três Picos State Park.

== Sources ==
- APA da Bacia dos Frades (in Portuguese), INEA: Instituto Estadual do Ambiente, archived from the original on 2016-10-05
- Costa, Cláudia; Lamas, Ivana; Fernandes, Rosan (December 2010), Planejamento Estratégico do Mosaico Central Fluminense (PDF) (in Portuguese), Reserva da Biosfera da Mata Atlântica, archived from the original (PDF) on 2016-10-07
- Mapa Mata Atlântica (PDF) (in Portuguese), MMA
- Parque Estadual dos Três Picos (in Portuguese), INEA: Instituto Estadual do Ambiente, archived from the original on 2018-12-29
