= Floresta do Jacarandá Environmental Protection Area =

- Área de Proteção Ambiental Floresta do Jacarandá
- IUCN category VI (protected area with sustainable use of natural resources)
- Location within Brazil
- Nearest city: Teresópolis, Rio de Janeiro
- Coordinates: 22.424326°S 42.924568°W
- Area: 2,700 hectares (6,700 acres)
- Designation: Environmental protection area
- Created: 23 July 1985

The Floresta do Jacarandá Environmental Protection Area (Portuguese: Área de Proteção Ambiental Floresta do Jacarandá) was an environmental protection area in the state of Rio de Janeiro, Brazil.

== Location ==
The Floresta do Jacarandá Environmental Protection Area (APA) was in the municipality of Teresópolis, Rio de Janeiro. It had an area of 2,700 hectares (6,700 acres). The area contains Atlantic Forest and sources of the Teresópolis water supply. A study published in 2001 noted that human activity had placed pressure on the environment in the W-NW of the reserve beside a slum along the BR-116 highway, and in the north where agricultural and tourist activities had expanded. The water was contaminated by fecal coliforms.

== History ==
The Floresta do Jacarandá Environmental Protection Area was created by state decree 8.280 of 23 July 1985 as an Area of Environmental Protection and Permanent Preservation, with its forests, water sources and other forms of vegetation located in the place called Floresta do Jacarandá. The APA was included in the Central Rio de Janeiro Atlantic Forest Mosaic, created in 2006. On 31 October 2013 state law 6.573 extinguished the Paraíso Ecological Station and the Jacarandá State Environmental Protection Area, and modified the Bacia dos Frades Environmental Protection Area and the Três Picos State Park.

== Sources ==
- APA Floresta do Jacarandá (in Portuguese), ISA: Instituto Socioambiental
- Costa, Cláudia; Lamas, Ivana; Fernandes, Rosan (December 2010), Planejamento Estratégico do Mosaico Central Fluminense (PDF) (in Portuguese), Reserva da Biosfera da Mata Atlântica, archived from the original (PDF) on 2016-10-07
- Parque Estadual dos Três Picos (in Portuguese), INEA: Instituto Estadual do Ambiente, archived from the original on 2018-12-29
- Silva, Marilu de Meneses; et al. (2001), "Degradação de área de proteção ambiental da floresta do Jacarandá, no município de Teresópolis, estado do Rio de Janeiro, Brasil: um estudo de caso.", ENCUENTRO DE GEOGRAFOS DE AMERICA LATINA (in Portuguese), vol. 8, Santiago. Resumenes: Universidad de Chile
