= Ibirapuitã Environmental Protection Area =

Protected area in Rio Grande do Sul, Brazil

- Área de Proteção Ambiental do Ibirapuitã
- IUCN category V (protected landscape/seascape)
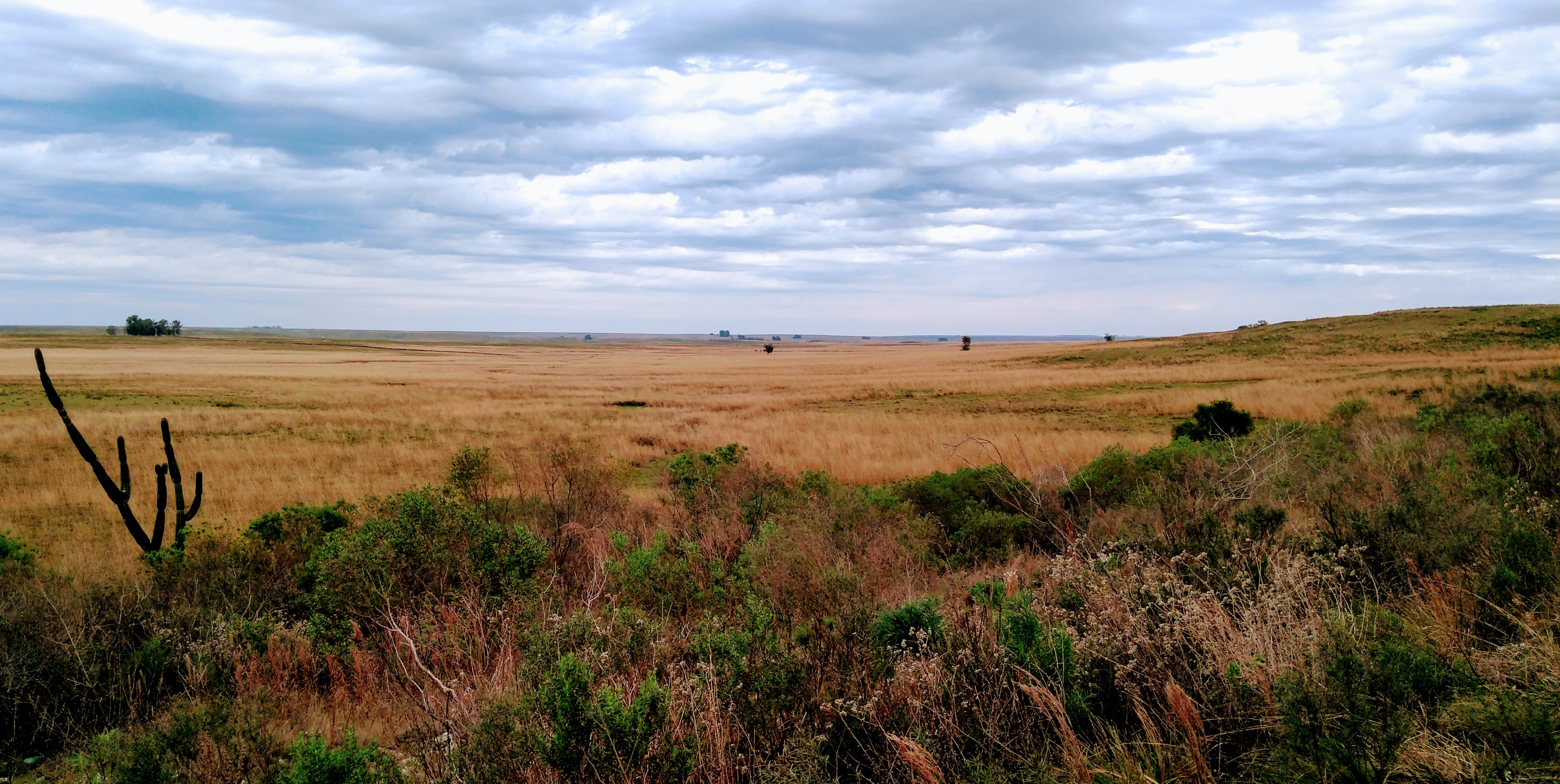

- Location within Brazil
- Nearest city: Alegrete, Rio Grande do Sul
- Coordinates: 30.356°S 55.659°W
- Area: 316,790 hectares (782,800 acres)
- Designation: Environmental Protection Area
- Created: 20 May 1992

Ibirapuitã Environmental Protection Area (Portuguese: Área de Proteção Ambiental do Ibirapuitã) is a protected area in the state of Rio Grande do Sul, Brazil. It is in the Uruguayan savanna ecoregion.

== Location ==
The protected area, which covers 316,790 hectares (782,800 acres) of pampas biome, was created on 20 May 1992. It is administered by the Chico Mendes Institute for Biodiversity Conservation. The area includes parts of the Alegrete, Quaraí, Rosário do Sul and Santana do Livramento municipalities of Rio Grande do Sul. It is in the upper basin of the Ibirapuitã River, a tributary of the Ibicuí River. The climate is subtropical with average annual temperature of 18.6 °C (65.5 °F).

== Conservation ==
The area is classified as IUCN protected area category Ia, Strict Nature Reserve. The primary purposes are to conserve a significant portion of the pampas biome, protect biological diversity and control human activities to ensure sustainable use of natural resources. Protected species include the mussels Lamproscapha ensiformis, Mycetopoda siliquosa, and Mycetopoda legumen.

== Sources ==
- APA de Ibirapuitã (in Portuguese), Chico Mendes Institute for Biodiversity Conservation, archived from the original on 2015-10-24
- Área de Proteção Ambiental Ibirapuitã (in Portuguese), Via Rural, archived from the original on January 22, 2017
- Unidade de Conservação: Área de Proteção Ambiental Ibirapuitã (in Portuguese), MMA: Ministério do Meio Ambiente
