= Lago do Amapá Environmental Protection Area =

Protected area in Acre, Brazil

Lago do Amapá Environmental Protection Area is an Environmental Protection Area in Acre, Brazil. Área de Proteção Ambiental Lago do Amapá covers 5,224-hectare (51.77 km²) in the area around Rio Branco. The protected area was established in 2005.

The Field Museum published a paper on lianas in the area.

A species of passion flower, Passiflora acreana, was described in 2023 from specimens collected in the area.

== See also ==
- Amapá National Forest
- Amapá Biodiversity Corridor
- Rio Amapá Sustainable Development Reserve
