= Piaçabuçu Environmental Protection Area =

- Área de Proteção Ambiental de Piaçabuçu
- IUCN category V (protected landscape/seascape)
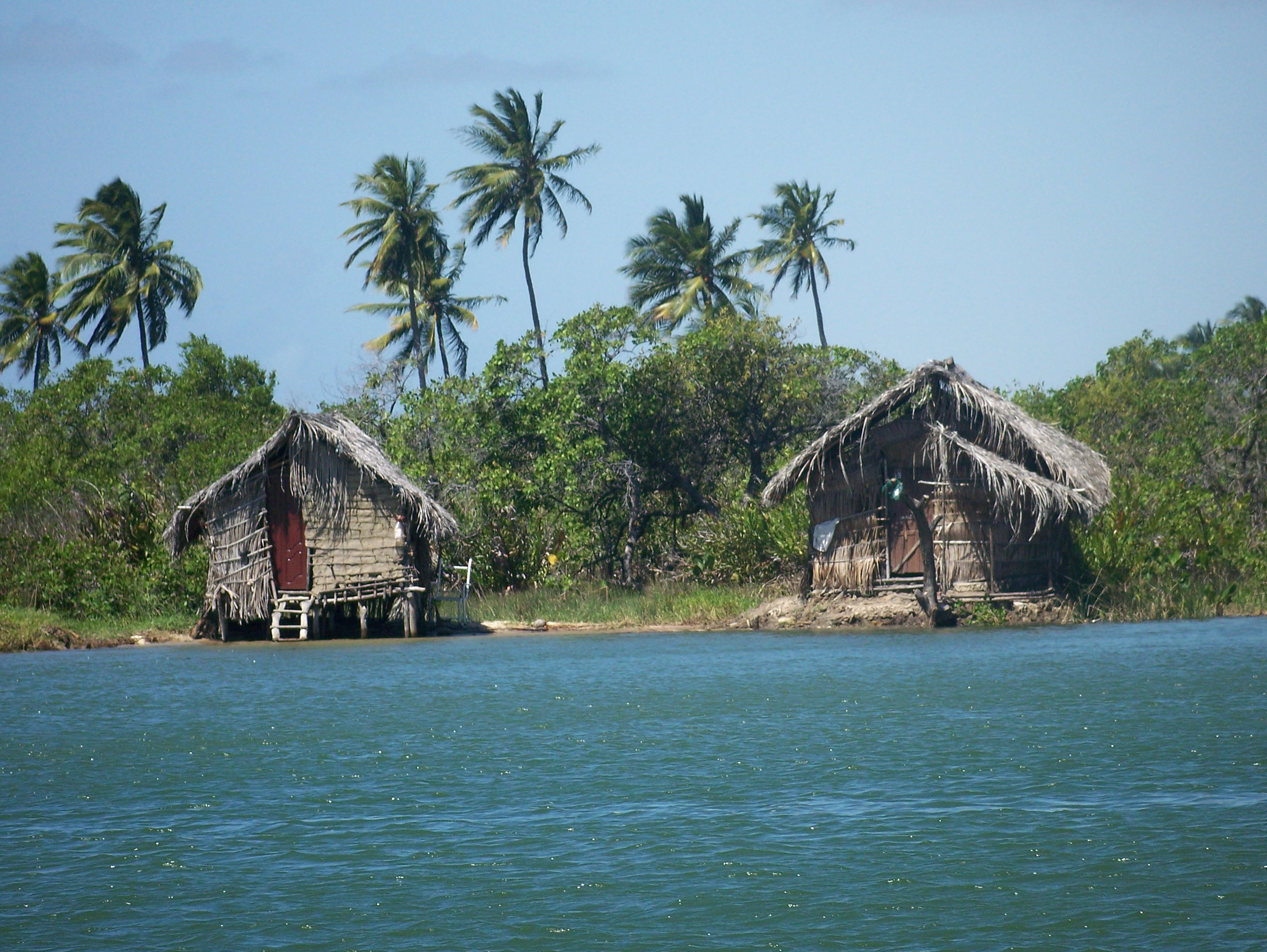
- Fishing houses, São Francisco River

- Location within Brazil
- Nearest city: Penedo, Alagoas
- Coordinates: 10°22′01″S 36°21′50″W
- Area: 9,106 hectares (22,500 acres)
- Designation: Environmental Protection Area
- Created: 21 June 1983

Piaçabuçu Environmental Protection Area (Portuguese: Área de Proteção Ambiental de Piaçabuçu) is a protected coastal area in the state of Alagoas, Brazil.

== Location ==
The coastal marine protection area, with an area of 9,106 hectares (22,500 acres), was created on 21 June 1983. It is administered by the Chico Mendes Institute for Biodiversity Conservation. It covers all or part of the municipalities of Feliz Deserto and Piaçabuçu in the state of Alagoas. The people of the area live by fishing, either by line or trawling with motorized boats.

== Conservation ==
The environmental conservation area is classed as IUCN protected area category V, protected landscape/seascape. The purpose is to protect biological diversity, control human occupation and ensure the sustainable use of natural resources. Specific goals are to protect marine turtles and seabirds, and to stabilize the dunes. Protected species include the olive ridley sea turtle (Lepidochelys olivacea).

== Sources ==
- APA de Piaçabuçú (in Portuguese), Chico Mendes Institute for Biodiversity Conservation
- "Área de Proteção Ambiental de Piaçabuçu", Via Rural (in Portuguese), archived from the original on February 7, 2017
- Unidade de Conservação: Área de Proteção Ambiental de Piaçabuçu (in Portuguese), MMA: Ministério do Meio Ambiente
