= Cachoeiras de Macacu =

- Municipality
- Município de Cachoeiras de Macacu
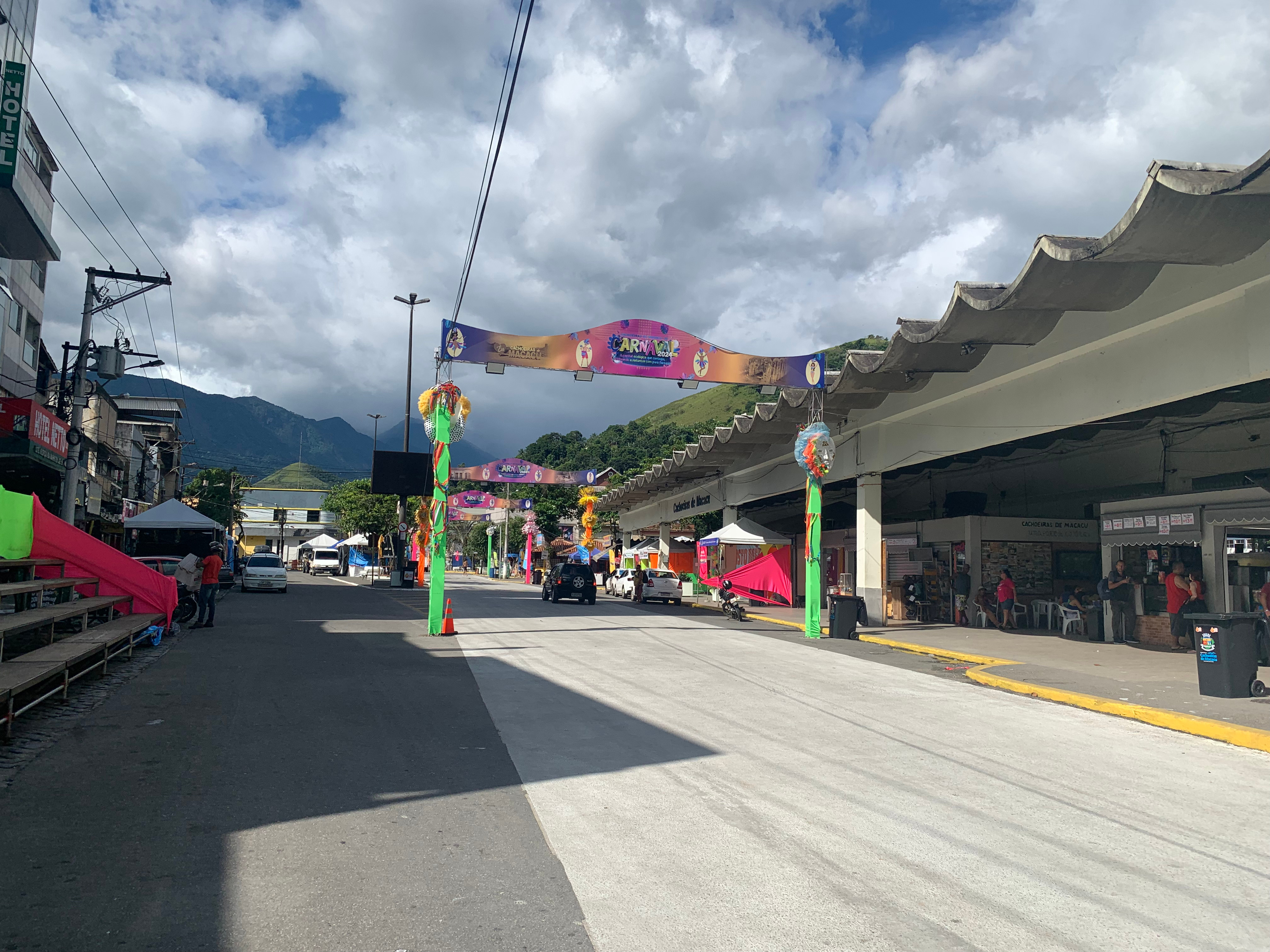
- Avenue Floriano Peixoto

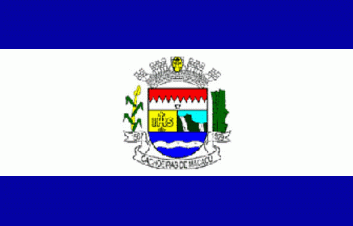
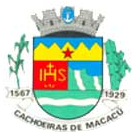
- Flag Coat of arms

- Location of Cachoeiras de Macacu in the state of Rio de Janeiro

- Location of Cachoeiras de Macacu in Brazil
- Coordinates: 22°27′46″S 42°39′10″W
- Country: Brazil
- Region: Southeast
- State: Rio de Janeiro

Government
  - Prefeito: Rafael Muzzi de Miranda (PP)

Area
  - Total: 955.806 km^{2} (369.039 sq mi)
- Elevation: 54 m (177 ft)

Population (2020)
  - Total: 59,303
- Time zone: UTC-3 (UTC-3)
- Website: prefeituracachoeiras.com

Cachoeiras de Macacu (Portuguese pronunciation: [kɐʃuˈejɾɐz dʒi mɐkɐˈku]; means "Macacu Waterfalls" in Portuguese) is a municipality located in the Brazilian state of Rio de Janeiro. Its population was 59,303 (2020) and its area is 956 km^{2} (369 sq mi). Next to neighboring Rio Bonito municipality, it can be considered an exurb of Greater Rio de Janeiro metropolis.

Its mayor is Rafael Muzzi de Miranda.

== Conservation ==
The municipality contains part of the Central Rio de Janeiro Atlantic Forest Mosaic, created in 2006. It held 76% of the 4,920-hectare (12,200-acre) Paraíso Ecological Station, created in 1987 and now integrated into the Três Picos State Park. It contains 49% of the 46,350-hectare (114,500-acre) Três Picos State Park, created in 2002. It contains part of the 19,508-hectare (48,210-acre) Bacia do Rio Macacu Environmental Protection Area, created in 2002.

== See also ==
- List of municipalities in Rio de Janeiro
