= Pardo River (Ribeira River tributary) =

River in Brazil

- Location within Brazil
- Native name: Rio Pardo (Portuguese)

Location
- Country: Brazil

Physical characteristics
- Source
  - location: São Paulo state
- Mouth
  - coordinates: 24.6741°S 48.6763°W

Basin features
- River system: Ribeira de Iguape River
- Tributaries
  - right: Turvo River

The Pardo River (Portuguese: Rio Pardo) is a river in southeastern Brazil. For all of its length, it forms the border between the states of São Paulo and Paraná. It is a right tributary of the Ribeira de Iguape River, which flows into the Atlantic Ocean.

== See also ==
- List of rivers of São Paulo
- List of rivers of Paraná
