= São Bartolomeu River Basin Environmental Protection Area =

Protected area of Brazil

- Área de Proteção Ambiental da Bacia do Rio São Bartolomeu
- IUCN category V (protected landscape/seascape)
- Location within Brazil
- Coordinates: 15°50′53″S 47°42′47″W
- Area: 82,680 hectares (204,300 acres)
- Designation: Environmental Protection Area
- Created: 7 November 1983

The São Bartolomeu River Basin Environmental Protection Area (Portuguese: Área de Proteção Ambiental da Bacia do Rio São Bartolomeu) is a protected area in the Federal District, Brazil.

== Location ==
The environmental protected area contains samples of the Cerrado biome. It covers 82,680 hectares (204,300 acres). It was created on 7 November 1983 and is administered by the Chico Mendes Institute for Biodiversity Conservation. The environmental protected area has territory distributed over the administrative regions of São Sebastião, Jardim Botânico, Paranoá, Itapoã, Sobradinho and Planaltina, in the Federal District.

== Conservation ==
The area is IUCN protected area category V (protected landscape/seascape). The purpose is to protect biological diversity, control human occupation and ensure sustainable use of natural resources. The area is an important corridor between the Águas Emendadas Ecological Station and the protected environment areas of Cafuringa, Lago Paranoá and the Gama and Cabeça-de-Veado basins. It contains all types of vegetation from the cerrado and the campos rupestres. Fauna include various specimens of native wildlife.

== Sources ==
- Àrea de Proteção Ambiental da Bacia do Rio São Bartolomeu (in Portuguese), Chico Mendes Institute for Biodiversity Conservation
- Unidade de Conservação: Área de Proteção Ambiental da Bacia do Rio São Bartolomeu (in Portuguese), MMA: Ministério do Meio Ambiente
