= Descoberto River Basin Environmental Protection Area =

Protected area in Brazil

- Área de Proteção Ambiental Bacia do Rio Descoberto
- IUCN category V (protected landscape/seascape)
- Location within Brazil
- Coordinates: 15.711°S 48.152°W
- Area: 41,064 hectares (101,470 acres)
- Designation: Environmental Protection Area
- Created: 7 November 1983

The Descoberto River Basin Environmental Protection Area (Portuguese: Área de Proteção Ambiental Bacia do Rio Descoberto) is a protected area in the basin of the Descoberto River, which provides a large part of the water supply to the Federal District, Brazil.

== Location ==
The environmental protected area has territory distributed over the administrative regions of Gama, Recanto das Emas, Samambaia, Ceilândia and Brazlândia, in the Federal District, and the municipalities of Padre Bernardo and Águas Lindas de Goiás, in Goiás. It extends to the west of the Brasília National Park and includes the Brasília National Forest, the Barragem do Descoberto reservoir and the Descoberto State Park. The Descoberto River, which originates with the Barracão and Capão da Onça streams in the administrative region of Brazlândia, is dammed to form the Descoberto reservoir, which supplies 60% of the water used by the Federal District.

== Administration ==
The protected area, which covers 41,064 hectares (101,470 acres), was created on 7 November 1983. It contains examples of the Cerrado biome. It is managed by the Chico Mendes Institute for Biodiversity Conservation. The area contains some human occupation. It is IUCN protected area category V (protected landscape/seascape). The purpose is to protect biological diversity, control human occupation and ensure sustainable use of natural resources.

== Sources ==
- Área de Proteção Ambiental da Bacia do Rio Descoberto (in Portuguese), Chico Mendes Institute for Biodiversity Conservation
- Área de Proteção Ambiental Bacia do Rio Descoberto (PDF) (in Portuguese), Ministério Público do Estado de Goiás
- "Área De Proteção Ambiental Da Bacia Do Rio Descoberto", ProtectedPlanet, ProtectedPlanet.net
- Unidade de Conservação: Área de Proteção Ambiental Bacia do Rio Descoberto (in Portuguese), MMA: Ministério do Meio Ambiente
