= Marcação =

Coordinates: 6.77°S 35.015°W

- Municipality
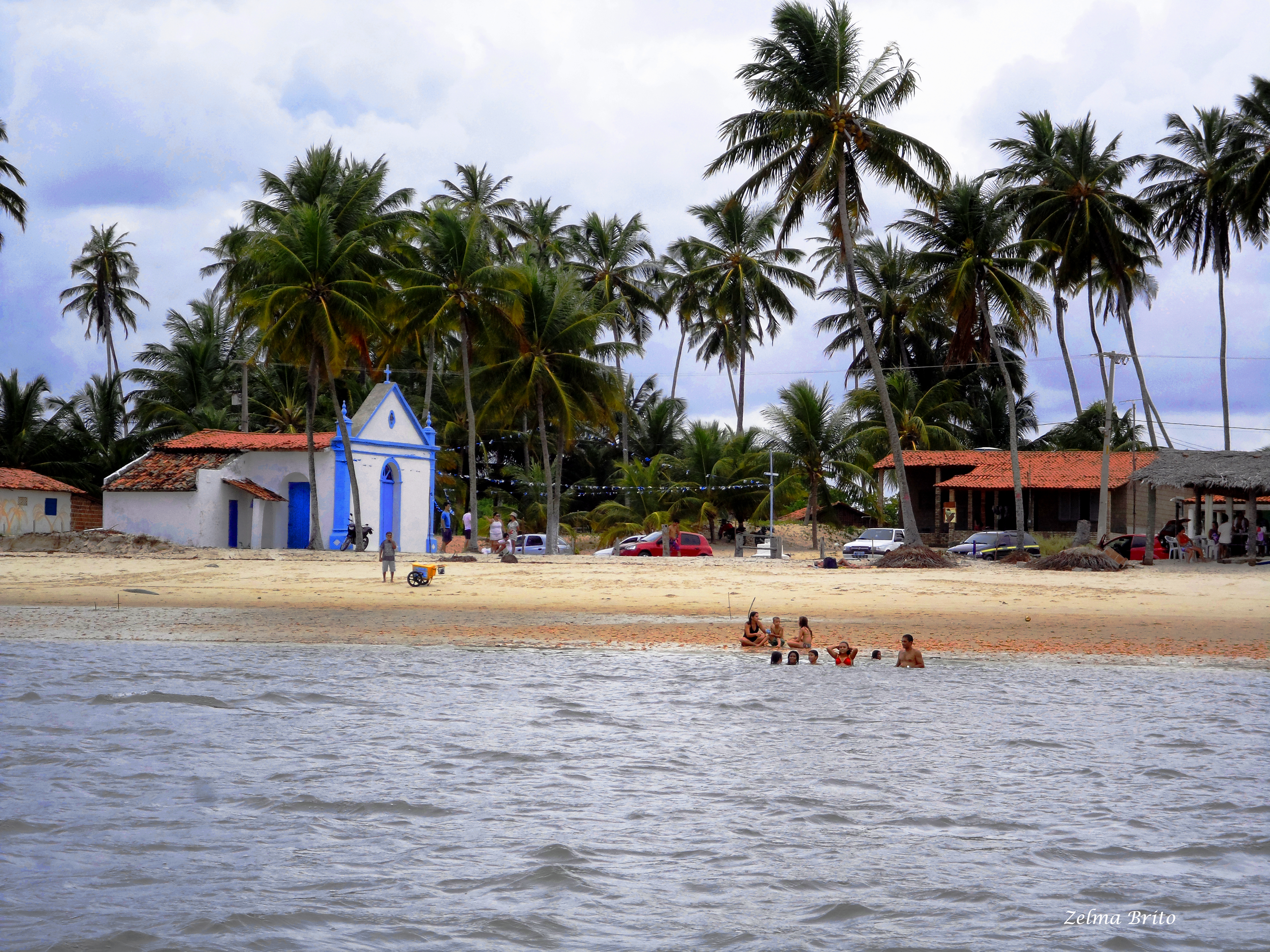

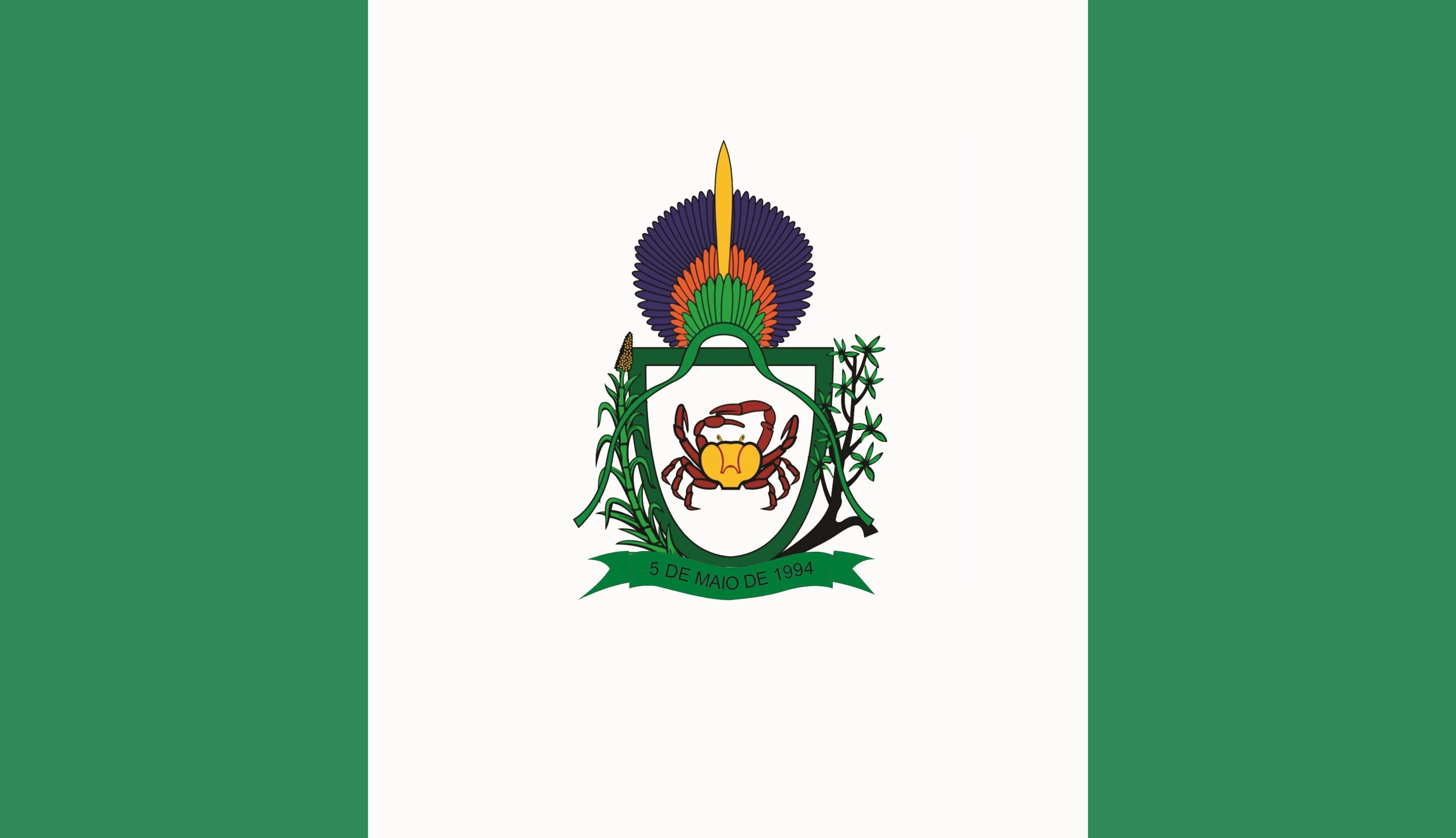
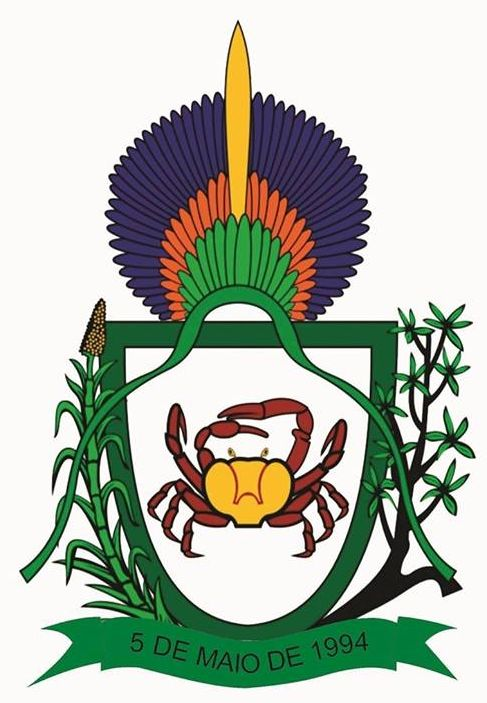
- Flag Coat of arms
- Interactive map of Marcação
- Country: Brazil
- Region: South
- State: Paraíba
- Mesoregion: Mata Paraibana

Population (2020)
  - Total: 8,653
- Time zone: UTC−3 (BRT)

Marcação is a municipality in the state of Paraíba in the Northeast Region of Brazil.

== See also ==
- List of municipalities in Paraíba
