= Environmental protection area (Brazil) =

Type of protected area in Brazil

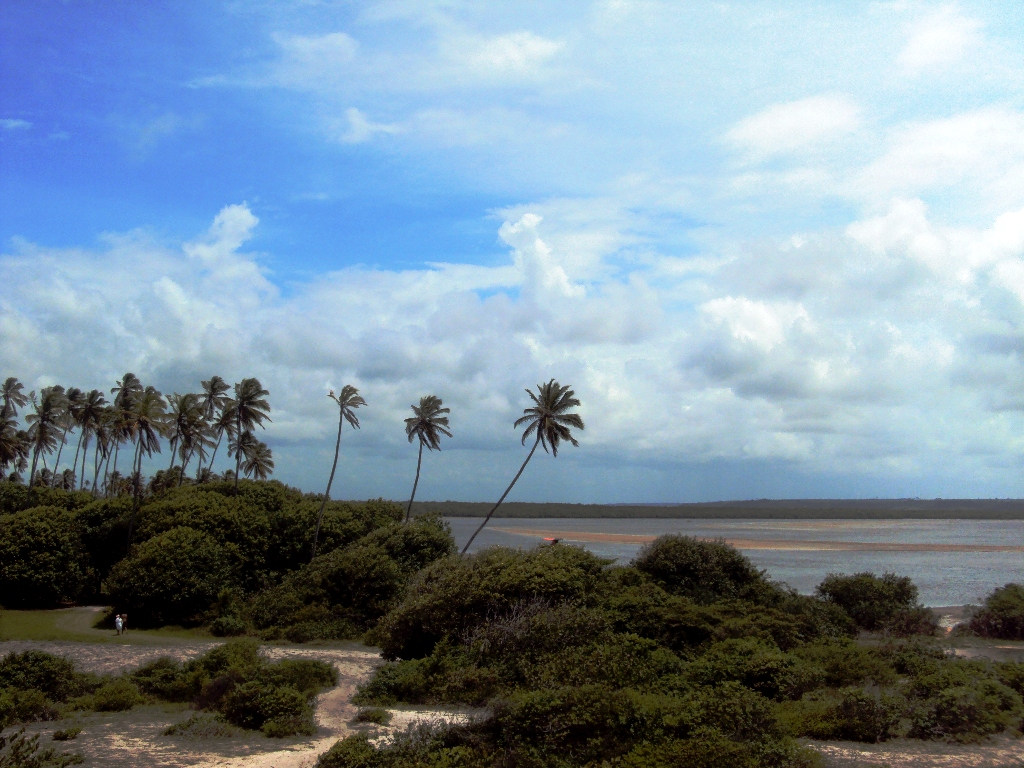
Barra do Rio Mamanguape Environmental Protection Area

An environmental protection area (Portuguese: Área de proteção ambiental: APA) is a type of protected area in Brazil that has some degree of human occupation, but where the primary intent is environmental protection. Human occupation is monitored and controlled. An environmental protection area often contains other types of conservation units, which may be more strictly protected.

== Definition ==
Environmental protection areas (APAs) are defined as part of the National System of Conservation Units regulated by Law 9985 of 18 July 2000. They are one of the types of sustainable use units, which try to reconcile conservation of nature with sustainable use of some natural resources. Other types of sustainable use unit are significant ecological interest area, national forest, extractive reserve, fauna reserve, sustainable development reserve, and natural heritage particular reserve.

As of 1993 APAs were defined as areas where wildlife, genetic diversity and other natural resources were to be conserved through adequate and sustainable use for the benefit of the local population, following a management plan to harmonise the various human activities. The APA was the closest concept to the Biosphere Reserve in Brazilian law, the main difference being that a strictly protected core zone was not required. However, the Brazilian Institute of Environment and Renewable Natural Resources (IBAMA) was drawing up new definitions that would include the requirement for core zones in APAs.

An APA may be public or private. Its main goal is to protect areas that are important to the well being and quality of life of humans through protecting biodiversity. Often they cover huge areas, with no buffer zone between the APA and unprotected areas. They fall under IUCN protected area category V: protected landscape/seascape. As of 2015 APAs accounted for 30% of protected areas. APA coverage in Brazil was:

- Federal: 100,101 square kilometres (38,649 sq mi)
- State: 334,898 square kilometres (129,305 sq mi)
- Municipal: 25,922 square kilometres (10,009 sq mi)

Environmental protection areas have a certain amount of human occupation, and may have environmental aspects that are important for aesthetic or cultural reasons to human populations. An APA does not require that land be expropriated, but does impose specific requirements on land use. An APA may contain other types of protected area, and must have a wildlife conservation area. Federal APAs are administered by the Chico Mendes Institute for Biodiversity Conservation (ICMBio).

The APA concept is derived from the Portuguese concept of Parques Naturais, which in turn is derived from the French concept of Parcs Naturels Régionaux. This has resulted in some inconsistencies with Brazilian law, which has caused some criticism.

== Selected list ==
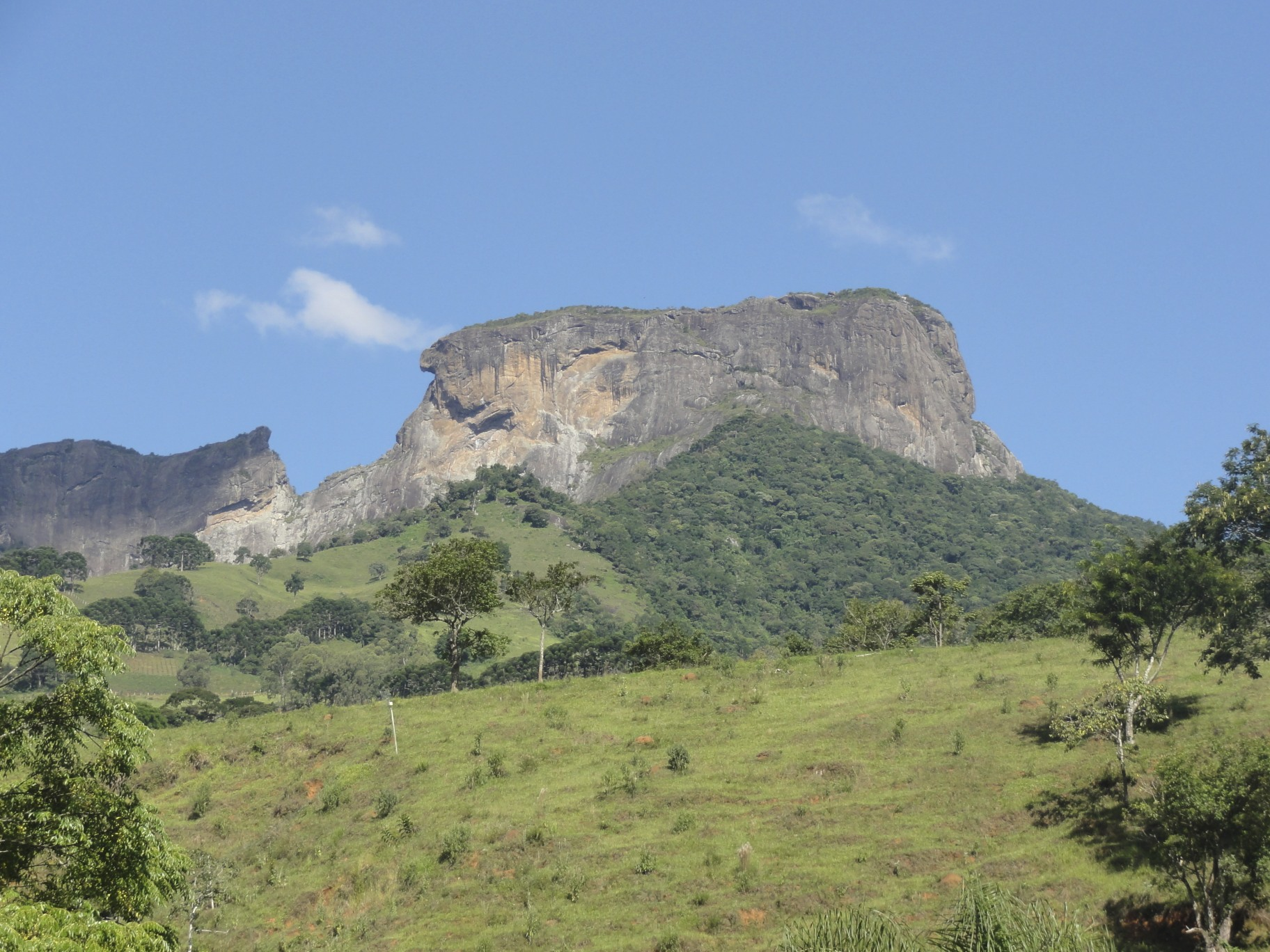
Bauzinho and Pedra do Baú formations in the Sapucaí Mirim Environmental Protection Area

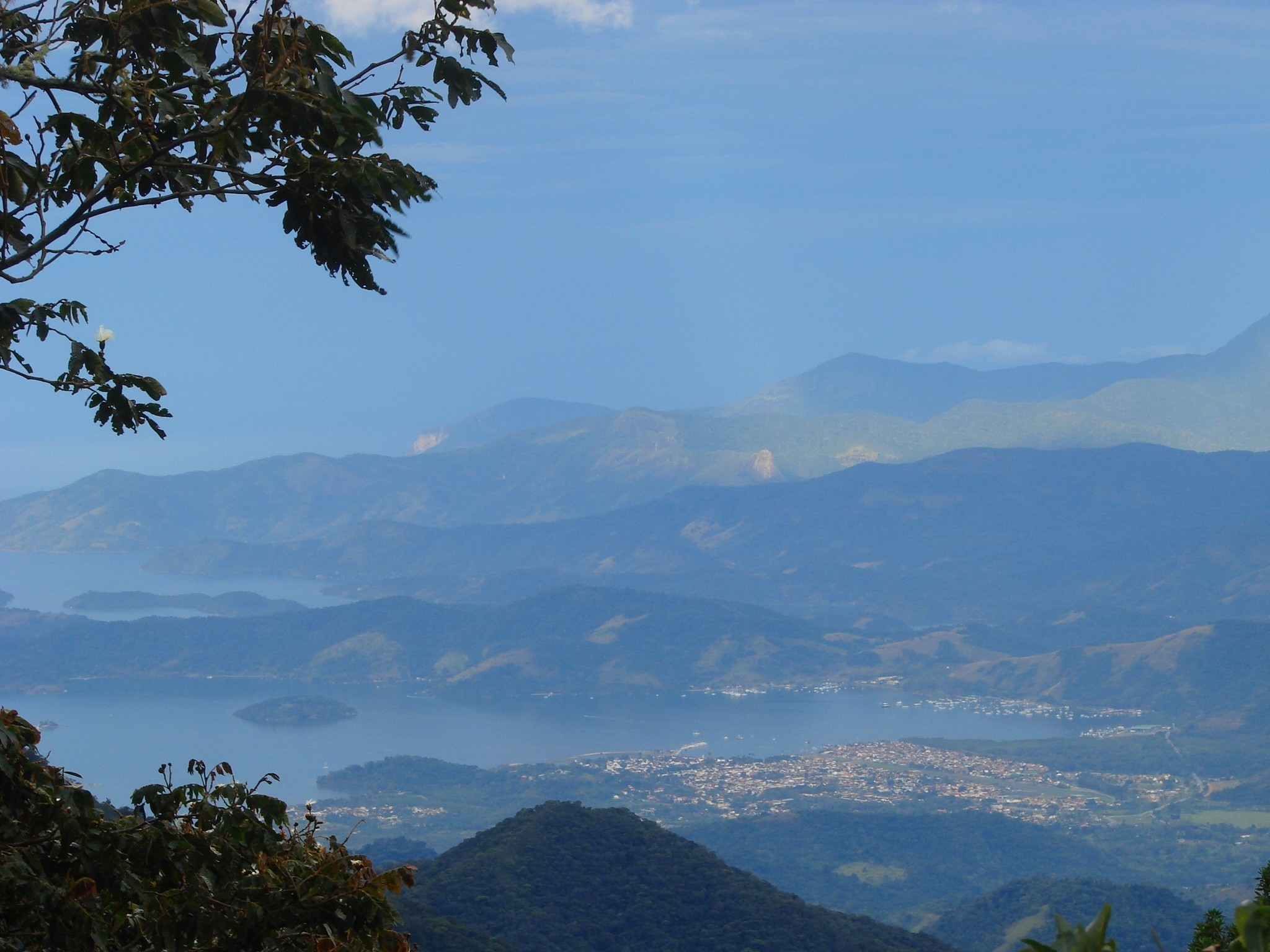
Parati Bay, protected by the Paraty Bay, Paraty-Mirim and Saco do Mamanguá Environmental Protection Area

Environmentally protected areas include:

| Name | Level | State | Area | Created | Biome |
|---|---|---|---|---|---|
| Algodoal-Maiandeua | State | Pará | 2,378 | 1990 | |
| Anhatomirim | Federal | Santa Catarina | 4,437 | 1992 | Atlantic Forest |
| Baía de Camamu | State | Bahia | 118,000 | 2002 | Atlantic Forest |
| Bacia dos Frades | State | Rio de Janeiro | 7,500 | 1990 | Atlantic Forest |
| Bacia do Rio Macacu | State | Rio de Janeiro | 19,508 | 2002 | Atlantic Forest |
| Baixada Maranhense | State | Maranhão | 1,775,040 | 1991 | Amazon |
| Baixo Rio Branco | State | Roraima | 1,207,650 | 2006 | |
| Baleia Franca | Federal | Santa Catarina | 156,100 | 2000 | |
| Barra do Rio Mamanguape | Federal | Paraíba | 14,640 | 1993 | Coastal marine |
| Cabeceiras do Rio Cuiabá | State | Mato Grosso | 473,411 | 1999 | |
| Cairuçu | Federal | Rio de Janeiro | 32,610 | 1983 | Atlantic Forest |
| Cajati | State | São Paulo | 2,976 | 2008 | Atlantic Forest |
| Caminhos Ecológicos de Boa Esperança | State | Bahia | 230,296 | 2003 | Atlantic Forest |
| Campos do Jordão | State | São Paulo | 28,800 | 1984 | Atlantic Forest |
| Campos de Manicoré | Federal | Amazonas | 151,993 | 2016 | Amazon |
| Cananéia-Iguape-Peruíbe | Federal | São Paulo | 202,307 | 1984 | Atlantic Forest |
| Carste de Lagoa | Federal | Minas Gerais | 39,957 | 1990 | Cerrado |
| Caverna do Maroaga | State | Amazonas | 374,700 | 1990 | Amazon |
| Cavernas do Peruaçu | Federal | Minas Gerais | 143,354 | 1989 | Cerrado |
| Chapada do Araripe | Federal | Piauí; Ceará; Pernambuco | 1,063,000 | 1997 | |
| Chapada dos Guimarães | State | Mato Grosso | 251,848 | 1995 | |
| Costa das Algas | Federal | Espírito Santo | 112,545 | 2010 | Atlantic Forest |
| Costa dos Corais | Federal | Pernambuco; Alagoas | 413,563 | 1997 | |
| Curiaú | State | Amapá | 23,000 | 1998 | |
| Delta do Parnaíba | Federal | Maranhão; Piauí; Ceará | 313,800 | 1996 | |
| Descoberto River Basin | Federal | Federal District | 41,064 | 1983 | Cerrado |
| Fazendinha | State | Amapá | 137 | 2004 | |
| Fernando de Noronha | Federal | Pernambuco | 93,000 | 1986 | Coastal marine |
| Fernão Dias | State | Minas Gerais | 180,073 | 1997 | Atlantic Forest |
| Floresta do Jacarandá | State | Rio de Janeiro | 2,700 | 1985 | Atlantic Forest |
| Foz do Rio Santa Teresa | State | Tocantins | 50,784 | 1997 | |
| Guajuma | State | Amazonas | 28,370 | 1989 | Amazon |
| Guapi-Guapiaçu | Municipal | Rio de Janeiro | 15,538 | 2004 | Atlantic Forest |
| Guapimirim | Federal | Rio de Janeiro | 13,926 | 1984 | Coastal marine |
| Guaraqueçaba | Federal | Paraná | 282,444 | 1985 | Atlantic Forest |
| Guaratuba | State | Paraná | 200,000 | 1992 | Atlantic Forest |
| Ibirapuitã | Federal | Rio Grande do Sul | 316,790 | 1992 | Pampas |
| Igarapé Gelado | Federal | Pará | 23,285 | 1989 | Amazon |
| Igarapé São Francisco | State | Acre | 30,000 | 2005 | |
| Ilha do Bananal / Cantão | State | Tocantins | 1,678,000 | 1997 | Amazon / Cerrado |
| Ilha do Combu | State | Pará | 1,500 | 1997 | |
| Ilha Comprida | State | São Paulo | 17,572 | 1987 | Atlantic Forest |
| Ilhas e Várzeas do Rio Paraná | Federal | São Paulo; Paraná; Mato Grosso do Sul | 1,003,060 | 1997 | |
| Itapiracó | State | Maranhão | 322 | 1997 | |
| Jalapão | State | Tocantins | 461,730 | 2000 | |
| Lago de Palmas | State | Tocantins | 50,370 | 1999 | |
| Lago de Peixe Angical | State | Tocantins | 78,874 | 2002 | |
| Lago de Santa Isabel | State | Tocantins | 18,608 | 2002 | |
| Lago de São Salvador etc. | State | Tocantins | 14,525 | 2002 | |
| Lago de Tucuruí | State | Pará | 568,667 | 2002 | |
| Lago do Amapá | State | Acre | 5,224 | 2005 | |
| Lagoa Encantada e Rio Almada | State | Bahia | 157,745 | 1993 | Atlantic Forest |
| Lagoa da Jansen | State | Maranhão | 196 | 1988 | |
| Leandro | State | Tocantins | 1,678,000 | 1997 | |
| Macaé de Cima | State | Rio de Janeiro | 35,037 | | Atlantic Forest |
| Mananciais do Rio Paraíba do Sul | Federal | São Paulo | 292,000 | 1982 | Atlantic Forest |
| Marajó Archipelago | State | Pará | 5,998,570 | 1989 | Coastal marine |
| Maravilha | Municipal | Rio de Janeiro | 1,700 | 2006 | Atlantic Forest |
| Meandros do Rio Araguaia | Federal | Tocantins; Mato Grosso; Goiás | 357,126 | 1998 | |
| Metropolitana de Belém | State | Pará | 7,500 | 1993 | |
| Morro da Pedreira | Federal | Minas Gerais | 131,769 | 1990 | Cerrado |
| Nascentes de Araguaína | State | Tocantins | 15,822 | 1999 | |
| Nascentes do Rio Paraguai | State | Mato Grosso | 77,743 | 2006 | |
| Nascentes do Rio Vermelho | Federal | Goiás | 176,159 | 2001 | |
| Nhamundá | State | Amazonas | 195,900 | 1990 | |
| Paraty Bay | Municipal | Rio de Janeiro | 5,642 | 1984 | Coastal Marine |
| Paytuna | State | Pará | 58,251 | 2001 | |
| Pé da Serra Azul | State | Mato Grosso | 7,980 | 1994 | |
| Petrópolis | Federal | Rio de Janeiro | 68,224 | 1982 | Atlantic Forest |
| Piaçabuçu | Federal | Alagoas | 9,106 | 1983 | Coastal marine |
| Planalto Central | Federal | Goiás; Federal District | 504,608 | 2002 | |
| Planalto do Turvo | State | São Paulo | 2,722 | 2008 | Atlantic Forest |
| Quilombos do Médio Ribeira | State | São Paulo | 64,625 | 2008 | Atlantic Forest |
| Reentrâncias Maranhenses | State | Maranhão | 2,680,910 | 1991 | |
| Região de Maracanã | State | Maranhão | 1,831 | 1991 | |
| Rio da Casca | State | Mato Grosso | 39,250 | 1994 | |
| Rio Curiaú | State | Amapá | 21,676 | 1992 | Amazon |
| Rio Madeira | State | Rondônia | 5,554 | 1991 | Amazon |
| Rio Negro Left Bank | State | Amazonas | 611,008 | 1995 | Amazon |
| Rio Negro Right Bank | State | Amazonas | 461,741 | 1995 | Amazon |
| Rio Pardinho e Rio Vermelho | State | São Paulo | 3,235 | 2008 | Atlantic Forest |
| Rio Pardo | State | Rondônia | 144,417 | 2010 | |
| Rio Paraíba do Sul | Federal | São Paulo | | 1982 | |
| Rio São Pedro de Jaceruba | Municipal | Rio de Janeiro | 2,474 | | Atlantic Forest |
| Salto Magessi | State | Mato Grosso | 7,846 | 2002 | |
| Santa Rosa | State | Mato Grosso | 313,467 | 2013 | |
| São Bartolomeu River Basin | Federal | Federal District | 82,680 | 1983 | Cerrado |
| São Francisco Xavier | State | São Paulo | 11,559 | 2002 | Atlantic Forest |
| São Geraldo do Araguaia | State | Pará | 29,655 | 1996 | |
| São João/Mico-Leão-Dourado River Basin | Federal | Rio de Janeiro | 150,700 | 2002 | |
| Sapucaí Mirim | State | São Paulo | 39,800 | 1998 | Atlantic Forest |
| Serra Branca / Raso da Catarina | State | Bahia | 67,234 | 2001 | Caatinga |
| Serra da Ibiapaba | Federal | Piauí; Ceará | 1,592,550 | 1996 | |
| Serra da Mantiqueira | Federal | Minas Gerais; Rio de Janeiro; São Paulo | 421,804 | 1982 | Atlantic Forest |
| Serra do Mar | State | São Paulo | 488,865 | 1984 | Atlantic Forest |
| Serra da Meruoca | Federal | Ceará | 608 | 2008 | |
| Serra de Tabatinga | Federal | Tocantins | 35,185 | 1990 | Cerrado |
| Serra do Lajeado | State | Tocantins | 121,416 | 1997 | |
| Serrinha do Alambari | Municipal | Rio de Janeiro | 5,760 | 1991 | Atlantic Forest |
| Suruí | Municipal | Rio de Janeiro | 14,146 | 2007 | Atlantic Forest |
| Tapajós | Federal | Pará | 2,039,581 | 2006 | |
| Triunfo do Xingu | State | Pará | 1,679,281 | 2006 | |
| Upaon-Açu/Miritiba/Alto Preguiças | State | Maranhão | 1,535,310 | 1992 | |

== See also ==
- Environmental governance in Brazil

== Sources ==
- Área de Proteção Ambiental (in Portuguese), ISA: Instituto Socioambiental
- Leite, Olavo (2015-12-01), A Recepção Do Modelo De Áreas De Proteção Ambiental (APA) No Direito Brasileiro (The Reception of the Concept of Environmental Protection Areas (APA) in Brazilian Law), Rochester, NY: Social Science Research Network, SSRN 2727435
- OECD (2015-11-04), OECD Environmental Performance Reviews OECD Environmental Performance Reviews: Brazil 2015, OECD Publishing, ISBN 978-92-64-24009-4
- Price, Andrew; Humphrey, Sarah (1993), Application of the Biosphere Reserve Concept to Coastal Marine Areas: Papers Presented at the UNESCO/IUCN San Francisco Workshop of 14-20 August 1989, IUCN, ISBN 978-2-8317-0135-6
- Sant’Anna, Luiz Fernando Henry; Rabinovici, Julia; Spitzeck, Marise Hosomi, Environment - Brazil, Law Business Research Ltd
