= Três Picos State Park =

State park in Rio de Janeiro, Brazil

- Parque Estadual dos Três Picos
- IUCN category II (national park)
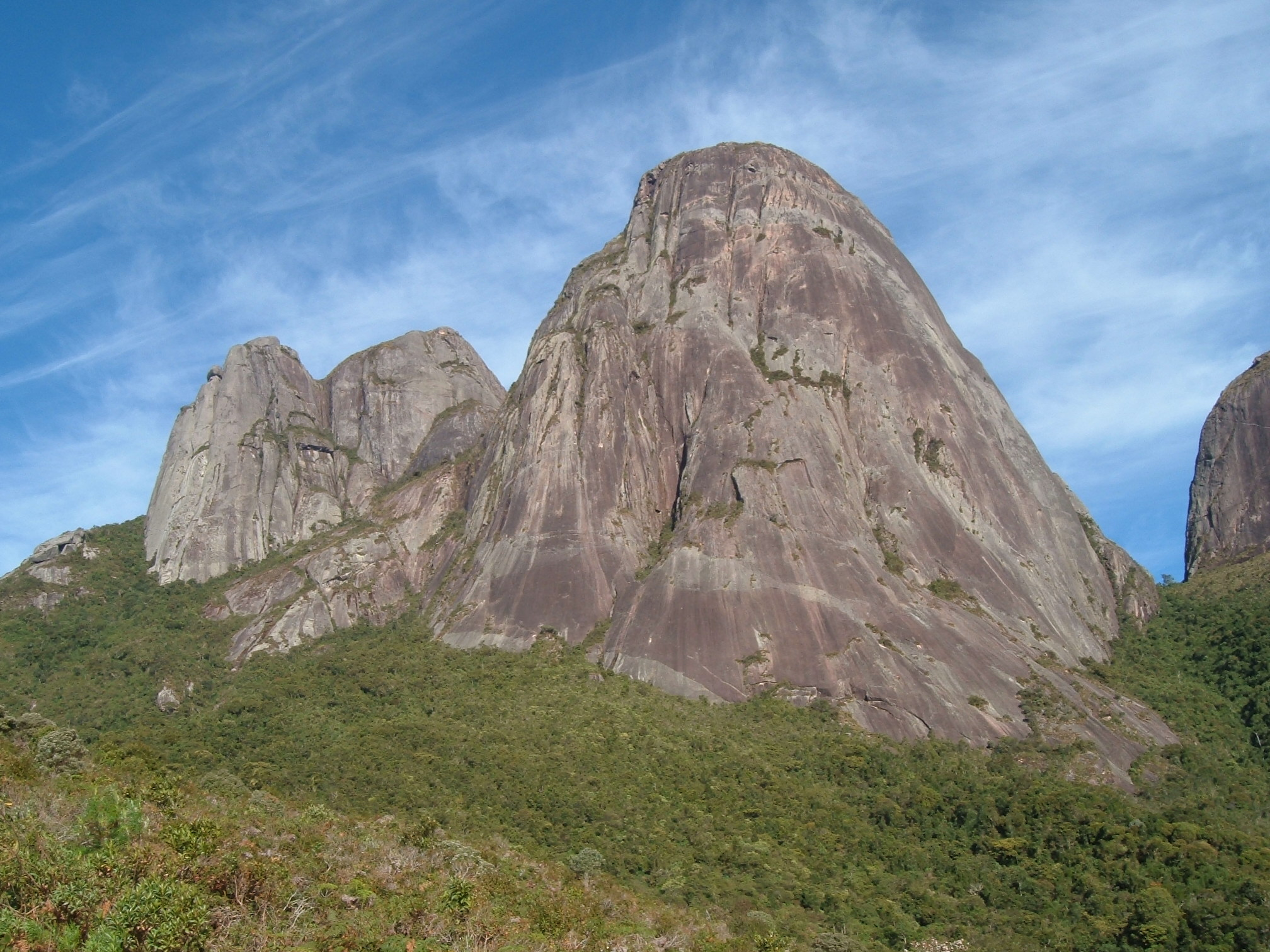
- Três Picos de Friburgo

- Location within Brazil
- Nearest city: Cachoeiras de Macacu, Rio de Janeiro
- Coordinates: 22.417046°S 42.609233°W
- Area: 65,113 hectares (160,900 acres)
- Designation: State park
- Created: 5 June 2002
- Administrator: INEA

The Três Picos State Park (Portuguese: Parque Estadual dos Três Picos) is a state park in the state of Rio de Janeiro, Brazil. It preserves a large, mountainous region of Atlantic Forest.

== Location ==
When created, the Três Picos State Park was divided between the municipalities of Cachoeiras de Macacu (48.92%), Guapimirim (4.21%), Nova Friburgo (19.26%), Silva Jardim (7.53%) and Teresópolis (20.08%) in the state of Rio de Janeiro. As of 2016 about two thirds of the area was in the municipality of Cachoeiras de Macacu. The park is named after the Três Picos (Three Peaks) mountains, which reach 2,316 metres (7,598 ft) in altitude, and are considered to be the center of the Serra do Mar range. The peaks present over 100 routes of varying levels of difficulty to climbers. There are dozens of waterfalls of great beauty in Cachoeiras de Macacu.

== Environment ==
The state park is the largest in Rio de Janeiro, and preserves a large portion of Atlantic Forest in excellent condition. The park has the greatest biodiversity found in Rio de Janeiro due to the range in altitude from 100 to 2,316 metres (328 to 7,598 ft). Vegetation ranges from dense sub-montane rainforest to cloud forest and alpine meadows. It is considered a priority for conservation. It is home to endangered species such as hawks and cougar (Puma concolor) that require large areas of preserved environment within which to find their prey. It also includes a variety of arthropods, fish, amphibians and reptiles.

== History ==
The Três Picos State Park was created by state decree 31.343 of 5 June 2002, with a total area of about 46,350 hectares (114,500 acres) in the Serra do Mar in the center of the state. The objectives are to ensure preservation of remnants of the Atlantic Forest in the portion of the Serra do Mar in Rio de Janeiro, to recover degraded areas, to preserve rare, endemic and endangered species of native fauna and flora, to integrate with the central Atlantic Forest corridor in the state, to maintain springs and water bodies that supply the cities, and to encourage recreation, environmental education and scientific research where compatible with the other goals.

The park is part of the Central Rio de Janeiro Atlantic Forest Mosaic, created in 2006. It was expanded by state decree 41990 of 12 August 2009 with the addition of 12,441 hectares (30,740 acres) in the municipalities of Cachoeiras de Macacu, Nova Friburgo and Silva Jardim. As of 2009 the area was 58,790 hectares (145,300 acres). On 31 October 2013 the boundaries were redefined by state law 6.573 with the extinction of the Paraíso Ecological Station and the Jacarandá State Environmental Protection Area and modification of the Bacia dos Frades Environmental Protection Area. As of 2016 the park covered 65,113 hectares (160,900 acres).

== Sources ==
- Costa, Cláudia; Lamas, Ivana; Fernandes, Rosan (December 2010), Planejamento Estratégico do Mosaico Central Fluminense (PDF) (in Portuguese), Reserva da Biosfera da Mata Atlântica
- Parque Estadual dos Três Picos (in Portuguese), INEA: Instituto Estadual do Ambiente
- Parque Estadual dos Três Picos (PDF) (in Portuguese), Secretaria do Ambiente RJ
- PES dos Três Picos (in Portuguese), ISA: Instituto Socioambiental
