= Cajati =

Municipality in the state of São Paulo, Brazil

- Municipality
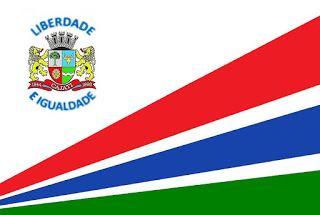
- Flag

- Location in São Paulo state

- Location in Brazil
- Coordinates: 24°44′10″S 48°7′22″W
- Country: Brazil
- Region: Southeast
- State: São Paulo

Area
  - Total: 454 km^{2} (175 sq mi)

Population (2020)
  - Total: 28,494
  - Density: 62.8/km^{2} (163/sq mi)
- Time zone: UTC−3 (BRT)

Cajati is a municipality in the state of São Paulo in Brazil. The population is 28,494 (2020 est.) in an area of 454 km^{2}. The elevation is 75 m.

The municipality contains part of the 182,596-hectare (451,200-acre) Rio Turvo State Park, created in 2008. It contains the 890-hectare (2,200-acre) Lavras Sustainable Development Reserve and the 2,976-hectare (7,350-acre) Cajati Environmental Protection Area, created at the same time. It contains part of the 40,175-hectare (99,270-acre) Caverna do Diabo State Park, also created in 2008. It contains 3% of the 2,722-hectare (6,730-acre) Planalto do Turvo Environmental Protection Area, created at the same time.

== Media ==
In telecommunications, the city was served by Telecomunicações de São Paulo. In July 1998, this company was acquired by Telefónica, which adopted the Vivo brand in 2012. The company is currently an operator of cell phones, fixed lines, internet (fiber optics/4G) and television (satellite and cable).

== See also ==
- List of municipalities in São Paulo

== Sources ==
- APA do Planalto do Turvo (in Portuguese), ISA: Instituto Socioambiental
- Parque Estadual Caverna do Diabo (in Portuguese), MMA: Ministério do Meio Ambiente
- Zanchetta, Inês; Bedeschi, Luciana (28 February 2008), Mosaico do Jacupiranga, no Vale do Ribeira, agora é lei (in Portuguese), ISA: Instituto Socioambiental, archived from the original on 2016-11-21
