= Jacupiranga =

- Municipality
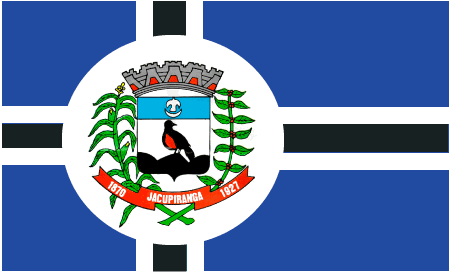
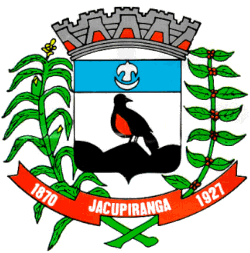
- Flag Coat of arms

- Location in São Paulo state

- Location in Brazil
- Coordinates: 24°41′33″S 48°0′8″W
- Country: Brazil
- Region: Southeast
- State: São Paulo

Area
  - Total: 704 km^{2} (272 sq mi)

Population (2020)
  - Total: 17,889
  - Density: 25.4/km^{2} (65.8/sq mi)
- Time zone: UTC−3 (BRT)

Jacupiranga is a municipality in the state of São Paulo in Brazil. The population is 17,889 (2020 est.) in an area of 704 km^{2} (272 sq mi). The elevation is 33 m.

The municipality contains part of the 182,596-hectare (451,200-acre) Rio Turvo State Park, created in 2008.

== Toponym ==
"Jacupiranga" is a Tupi term that means "red guan", through the combination of the terms ya'ku ("guan") and pyrang ("red"). The guans are birds of the genus Penelope, from the Cracidae family.

== Media ==
In telecommunications, the city was served by Telecomunicações de São Paulo. In July 1998, this company was acquired by Telefónica, which adopted the Vivo brand in 2012. The company is currently an operator of cell phones, fixed lines, internet (fiber optics/4G) and television (satellite and cable).

== See also ==
- Jacupiranga State Park
- List of municipalities in São Paulo
