= Paraíso Ecological Station =

- Estação Ecológica do Paraíso
- IUCN category Ia (strict nature reserve)
- Location within Brazil
- Nearest city: Cachoeiras de Macacu, Rio de Janeiro
- Coordinates: 22°28′24″S 42°53′43″W
- Area: 4,920 hectares (12,200 acres)
- Designation: Ecological station
- Created: 12 March 1987

The Paraíso Ecological Station (Portuguese: Estação Ecológica do Paraíso) was an ecological station in the state of Rio de Janeiro, Brazil. In 2013, it was absorbed into the Três Picos State Park.

== Location ==
The Paraíso Ecological Station (ESEC) was divided between the municipalities of Cachoeiras de Macacu (76.2%) and Guapimirim (23.8%). It had an area of 4,920 hectares (12,200 acres). The area was considered representative of the Brazilian Atlantic Forest ecosystem. It contained examples of submontane and montane forest.

== History ==
The Paraíso Ecological Station was created by state decree 9.803 of 12 March 1987. The objective was to conduct basic and applied research of the ecology, to protect the natural environment and to develop environmental education. It was expected that 90% of the area would be designated to permanent full preservation of the biota. In 1979, FEEMA, which was responsible for the ESEC, implemented the Primatology Center of Rio de Janeiro (CPRJ) to study Brazilian primates, breed them in captivity and reintroduce them in the wild, covering 260 hectares (640 acres).

The Paraíso Ecological Station was made part of the Central Rio de Janeiro Atlantic Forest Mosaic, created in 2006. As of September 2010, the primatology center held about 250 captive small and medium-sized primates in 85 nurseries, and was researching 16 species whose survival was compromised with a view to reintroducing them into their original environments.

On 31 October 2013 state law 6.573 extinguished the Paraíso Ecological Station and the Jacarandá State Environmental Protection Area, and modified the Bacia dos Frades Environmental Protection Area and the Três Picos State Park. The Paraíso Ecological Station was integrated into the state park. The primatology center continued operation in its original area.

== Sources ==
- Andreoni, Clayton; Mendes, Douglas (2012), Diagnóstico da Vegetação Estação Ecológica da Guanabara e Região (PDF) (in Portuguese), ICMBio
- Centro de Primatologia do Rio de Janeiro (CPRJ) (in Portuguese), INEA, archived from the original on 2016-10-03
- Costa, Cláudia; Lamas, Ivana; Fernandes, Rosan (December 2010), Planejamento Estratégico do Mosaico Central Fluminense (PDF) (in Portuguese), Reserva da Biosfera da Mata Atlântica, archived from the original (PDF) on 2016-10-07
- ESEC do Paraíso (in Portuguese), ISA: Instituto Socioambiental
- Ministério do Meio Ambiente da Alemanha visita projetos apoiados pelo AFCoF (in Portuguese), FUNBIO, 21 September 2010
- Parque Estadual dos Três Picos (in Portuguese), INEA: Instituto Estadual do Ambiente, archived from the original on 2018-12-29
