= Barra do Turvo =

Municipality in the state of São Paulo in Brazil

- Municipality
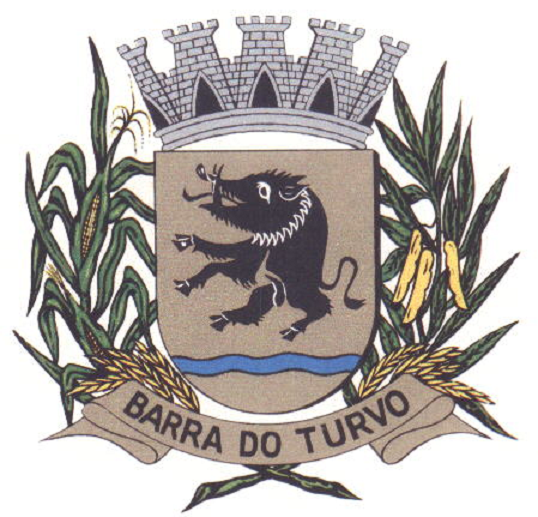
- Flag Coat of arms

- Location in São Paulo state

- Location in Brazil
- Coordinates: 24°45′23″S 48°30′17″W
- Country: Brazil
- Region: Southeast
- State: São Paulo

Area
  - Total: 1,008 km^{2} (389 sq mi)

Population (2020)
  - Total: 7,632
  - Density: 7.571/km^{2} (19.61/sq mi)
- Time zone: UTC−3 (BRT)

Barra do Turvo is a municipality in the state of São Paulo in Brazil. The population is 7,632 (2020 est.) in an area of 1,008 km^{2} (389 sq mi). The elevation is 158 m (518 ft).

== Demographics ==
Historical population (municipality)
Year	Population	%±
1970	3,980	—
1980	4,882	22.7%
1991	7,124	45.9%
2000	8,108	13.8%
2010	7,729	−4.7%
2022	6,876	−11.0%
Est. 2024	6,922	0.7%

== Media ==
In telecommunications, the city was served by Companhia de Telecomunicações do Estado de São Paulo until 1973, when it began to be served by Telecomunicações de São Paulo. In July 1998, this company was acquired by Telefónica, which adopted the Vivo brand in 2012.

The company is currently an operator of cell phones, fixed lines, internet (fiber optics/4G) and television (satellite and cable).

== Conservation ==
The municipality contains part of the 182,596-hectare (451,200-acre) Rio Turvo State Park, created in 2008. It contains 97% of the 2,722-hectare (6,730-acre) Planalto do Turvo Environmental Protection Area, created at the same time. It contains the 3,235-hectare (7,990-acre) Rio Pardinho e Rio Vermelho Environmental Protection Area. It contains part of the 40,175-hectare (99,270-acre) Caverna do Diabo State Park, also created in 2008. The municipality contains 3% of the 64,625-hectare (159,690-acre) Quilombos do Médio Ribeira Environmental Protection Area, established in 2008. It contains the 1,530-hectare (3,800-acre) Pinheirinhos Sustainable Development Reserve, also created in 2008. It contains the 3,175-hectare (7,850-acre) Barreiro/Anhemas Sustainable Development Reserve, created at the same time.

== See also ==
- List of municipalities in São Paulo

== Sources ==
- APA do Planalto do Turvo (in Portuguese), ISA: Instituto Socioambiental
- APA do Rio Pardinho e do Rio Vermelho (in Portuguese), ISA: Instituto Socioambiental
- Zanchetta, Inês; Bedeschi, Luciana (28 February 2008), Mosaico do Jacupiranga, no Vale do Ribeira, agora é lei (in Portuguese), ISA: Instituto Socioambiental, archived from the original on 2016-11-21

== Demographics ==
Barra do Turvo is a small municipality in southern São Paulo State, located on the border with Paraná, with an estimated population of 6,894 inhabitants in 2025."Cities and States - IBGE". IBGE. According to the 2022 census, the population was 6,876 inhabitants, demonstrating relative demographic stability. The municipality has a territorial area of 1,007.684 km² and a demographic density of only 6.82 inhabitants/km²."Municipal Panorama". IBGE.

The low population density characterizes Barra do Turvo as an eminently rural municipality with significant environmental preservation characteristics. The location on the border with Paraná (separated by the Rio Pardinho) confers regional importance to the municipality.

== Economy ==
Barra do Turvo's economy is based mainly on agricultural activities and sustainable forest extraction. The per capita GDP is R$ 21,110.97 (2023 data), reflecting an economy based on natural resources."Economic Indicators - IBGE". IBGE. Atlantic Forest preservation is an important characteristic of the region, with opportunities for ecotourism and environmental conservation projects.

== Tourism ==
Barra do Turvo is an emerging destination for ecotourism and nature tourism. The municipality is part of the Atlantic Forest preservation region, offering opportunities for hiking, wildlife observation, and contact with preserved ecosystems. Proximity to Paraná offers potential for integrated tourist circuits in the region.

== Infrastructure ==
The municipality is connected through state and federal highways to the region. Barra do Turvo has basic infrastructure for healthcare, education, and municipal services. Water, energy, and telecommunications are adequate for the rural population. Environmental preservation is a priority, balancing development and conservation.

== Education ==
Barra do Turvo offers kindergarten and elementary education for its dispersed school population. The municipality has schools serving local rural communities. Access to secondary education is facilitated by proximity to larger urban centers in neighboring municipalities.
