= Jacupiranga State Park =

Former state park in São Paulo, Brazil

- Parque Estadual de Jacupiranga
- IUCN category II (national park)
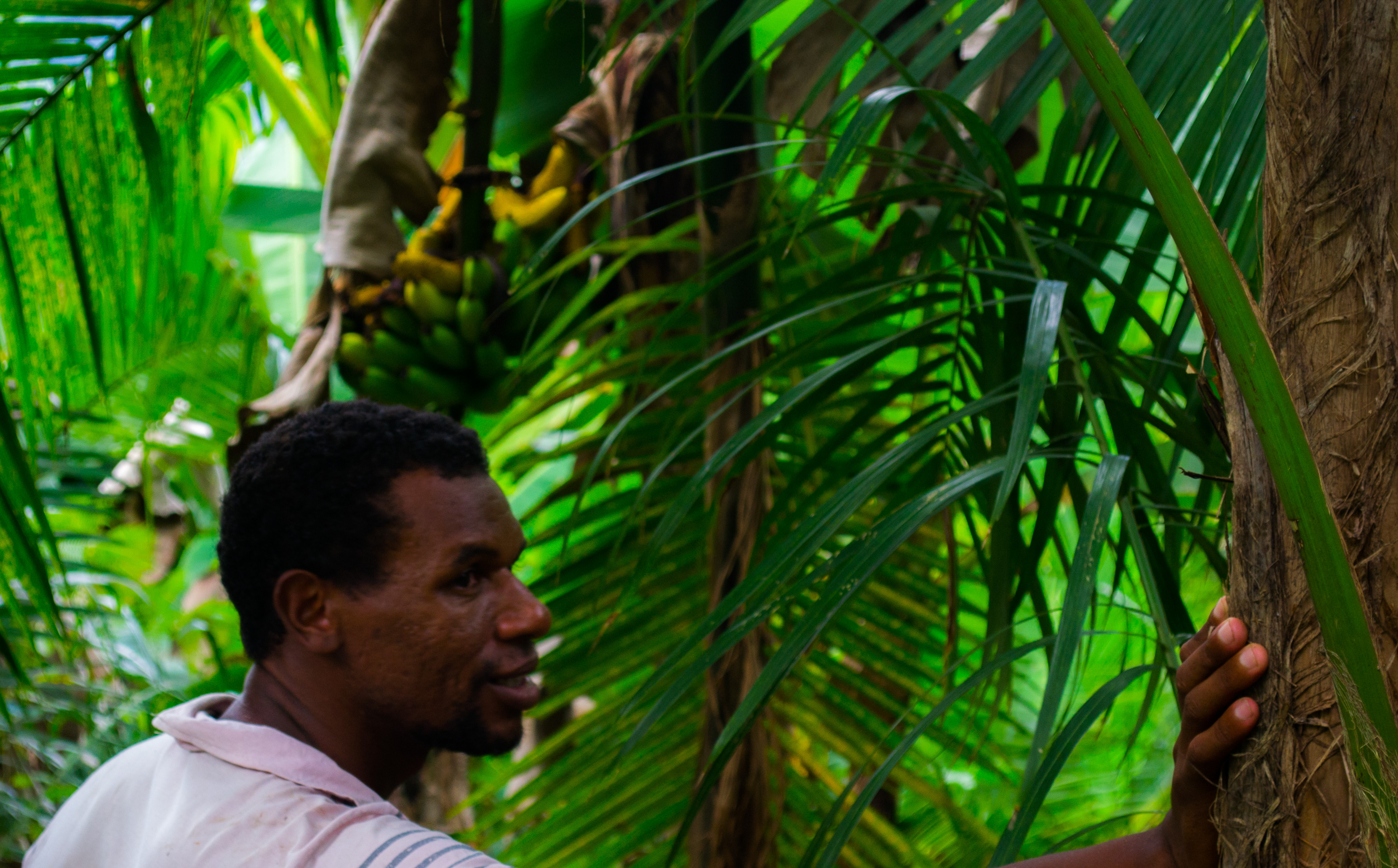
- Quilombola in Quilombos de Barra do Turvo Sustainable Development Reserve, formerly in the park

- Location within Brazil
- Location: São Paulo, Brazil
- Coordinates: 24°52′9″S 48°21′0″W
- Area: 150,000 ha (370,000 acres)
- Designation: State park
- Created: 8 August 1969
- Disestablished: 2008

The Jacupiranga State Park (Portuguese: Parque Estadual de Jacupiranga) was a state park in São Paulo, Brazil. It covered a large, mountainous region that included untouched Atlantic Forest and land occupied by traditional communities. When the park was created in 1969 the residents could no longer legally practice sustainable farming and extraction of forest resources, leading to land use conflicts, which mounted as the BR-116 highway opened the park to squatters from elsewhere. Eventually, in 2008 the park was combined with surrounding territory and broken up into three smaller state parks and various other units in which sustainable development was allowed.

== Location ==
The Jacupiranga State Park was divided between the municipalities of Barra do Turvo, Cajati, Cananéia, Eldorado, Iporanga and Jacupiranga, in the Vale do Ribeira region of the, south of the State of São Paulo. Most of the park was in the Ribeira de Iguape River basin. It had an area of about 150,000 hectares (370,000 acres). Altitudes ranged from 10 to 1,310 metres (33 to 4,298 ft), with most of the land at between 700 and 900 metres (2,300 and 3,000 ft). A few isolated peaks in the Serra do Mar reached greater altitudes. The region contains a large number of medium-sized caves, and the park held six caves with tourist potential. The Caverna do Diabo is a major tourist attraction. The area also contains archaeological sites such as sambaquis.

The area contains large tracts of Atlantic Forest. Vegetation includes dense rainforest, dense rainforest with limestone outcrops, restinga forest and sandy restinga. The forest was not continuous, and was subject to intense pressures from residents around and within the park. It was cut by several roads and highways, the largest being the Regis Bittencourt Highway (BR-116). Most of the communities in the park were established when this highway was opened, Others were traditional communities such as quilombolas and caiçaras.

== History ==
The Jacupiranga State Park was created by decree-law 145 of 8 August 1969. The park was classed as IUCN protected area category II (national park). It was part of the Lagamar Mosaic. Much of the state park was made of areas inhabited by traditional communities, who were no longer able to legally carry out sustainable activities. Various conflicts arose over land use, and these intensified with the arrival of other squatters and grileiros making fake land deeds. Law 10.850 of 6 July 2001 altered the boundaries of the Jacupiranga State Park to exclude the quilombola communities of Nhunguara, Sapatu and André Lopes, and the Intervales State Park to exclude the quilombola communities of Pilões, Maria Rosa, São Pedro, Ivaporunduva and Pedro Cubas. These communities were included in the Serra do Mar Environmental Protection Area (APA).

With a worsening situation in the remaining park area, at the request of the communities an attempt was made to introduce a bill to resolve the land conflicts in 2003, but it was vetoed by the state government as being insufficient and ineffective. A working group was then formed with representatives of government and non-government bodies, chaired by the president of the Atlantic Forest Biosphere Reserve, which presented its recommendations to the Legislative Assembly of the State of São Paulo in June 2007. After negotiations and adjustments the plan was approved by the legislature on 20 December 2007.

On 21 February 2008 the Jacupiranga State Park was dissolved and replaced by the much larger Jacupiranga Mosaic, containing three state parks and 11 other conservation units. The state parks were the Caverna do Diabo State Park, Rio Turvo State Park and the Lagamar de Cananéia State Park. The quilombola communities that had formerly been in the state park, and then in the Serra do Mar APA were made part of the Quilombos do Médio Ribeira Environmental Protection Area.

== Sources ==
- APA da Serra do Mar (APA) (in Portuguese), ISA: Instituto Socioambiental
- Caverna do Diabo é reaberta para turistas | Notícias | Portal do Governo do Estado de São Paulo (in Portuguese), Saopaulo.sp.gov.br
- Salino, Alexandre; Almeida, Thaís Elias (2008), "Pteridófitas do Parque Estadual do Jacupiranga, SP, Brasil", Acta Botanica Brasilica (in Portuguese), 22 (4): 983–991, doi:10.1590/S0102-33062008000400009
- Unidades de Conservação - Mosaico do Litoral Sul de São Paulo e do Litoral do Paraná - LAGAMAR (in Portuguese), ICMBio, archived from the original on 2019-05-27
- Wood, L. J. (2007), "Jacupiranga State Park - a Marine Protected Area in Brazil - Overview", MPA Global: A database of the world's marine protected areas. Sea Around Us Project, UNEP-WCMC & WWF, archived from the original on 2012-06-15
- Zanchetta, Inês; Bedeschi, Luciana (28 February 2008), Mosaico do Jacupiranga, no Vale do Ribeira, agora é lei (in Portuguese), ISA: Instituto Socioambiental, archived from the original on 2016-11-21
