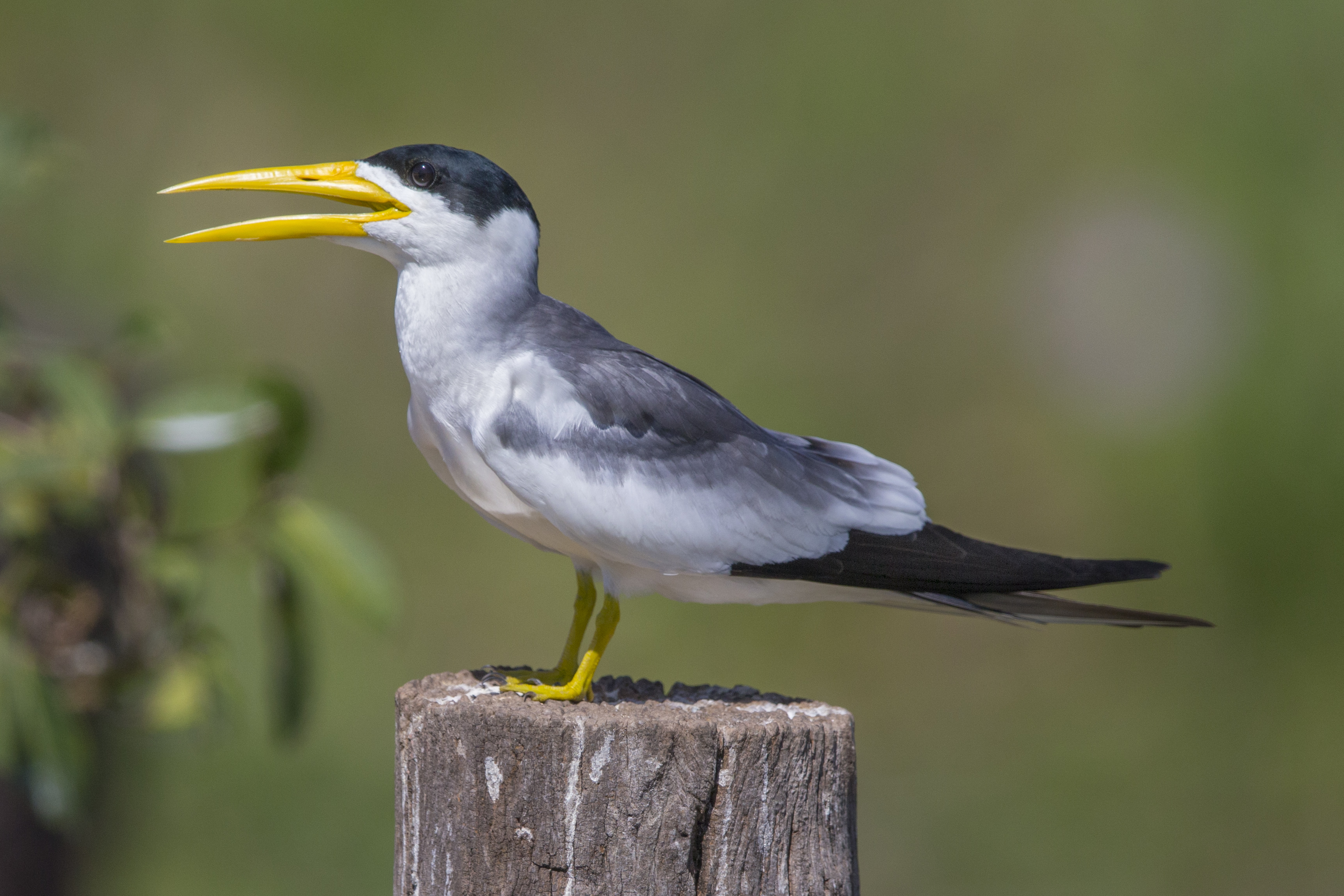
- at Cuiaba river, Pantanal, Mato Grosso state, Brazil

Conservation status
- Least Concern (IUCN 3.1)

Scientific classification
- Kingdom: Animalia
- Phylum: Chordata
- Class: Aves
- Order: Charadriiformes
- Family: Laridae
- Genus: Phaetusa; Wagler, 1832
- Species: P. simplex

Binomial name
- Phaetusa simplex (Gmelin, JF, 1789)

= Large-billed tern =

Species of bird

The large-billed tern (Phaetusa simplex) is a species of tern in the family Laridae. It is placed the monotypic genus Phaetusa. It is found in most of South America (east of the Andes and north of the Pampas). It has occurred as a vagrant in Aruba, Bermuda, Cuba, Panama and the United States. Its natural habitats are rivers and freshwater lakes.

== Taxonomy ==
The large-billed tern was formally described in 1789 by the German naturalist Johann Friedrich Gmelin in his revised and expanded edition of Carl Linnaeus's Systema Naturae. He placed it with the other terns in the genus Sterna and coined the binomial name Sterna simplex. Gmelin based his description on the "simple tern" that had been described in 1785 by the English ornithologist John Latham in his book A General Synopsis of Birds from a specimen that had been collected in Cayenne, French Guiana. The large-billed tern is now the only species placed in the genus Phaetusa that was introduced for the species in 1832 by the German naturalist Johann Georg Wagler. The genus name comes from Greek mythology. Phaetusa (or Heliades) was sister to Phaethon and one of the daughters of Phoebus (Helios) and Clymene. The specific epithet simplex is Latin meaning "simple" or "plain". The species is monotypic: no subspecies are recognised.

== Description ==
The large-billed tern is large, short-tailed tern with a large yellow bill. It is around 38 cm (15 in) in overall length and weighs 208–247 g (7.3–8.7 oz). The crown and ear-coverts are black, the upperparts are grey, the secondaries, primary coverts, lores and underparts are white. The legs and feet are yellow. A non-breeding adult has a paler crown and forehead.

== Gallery ==
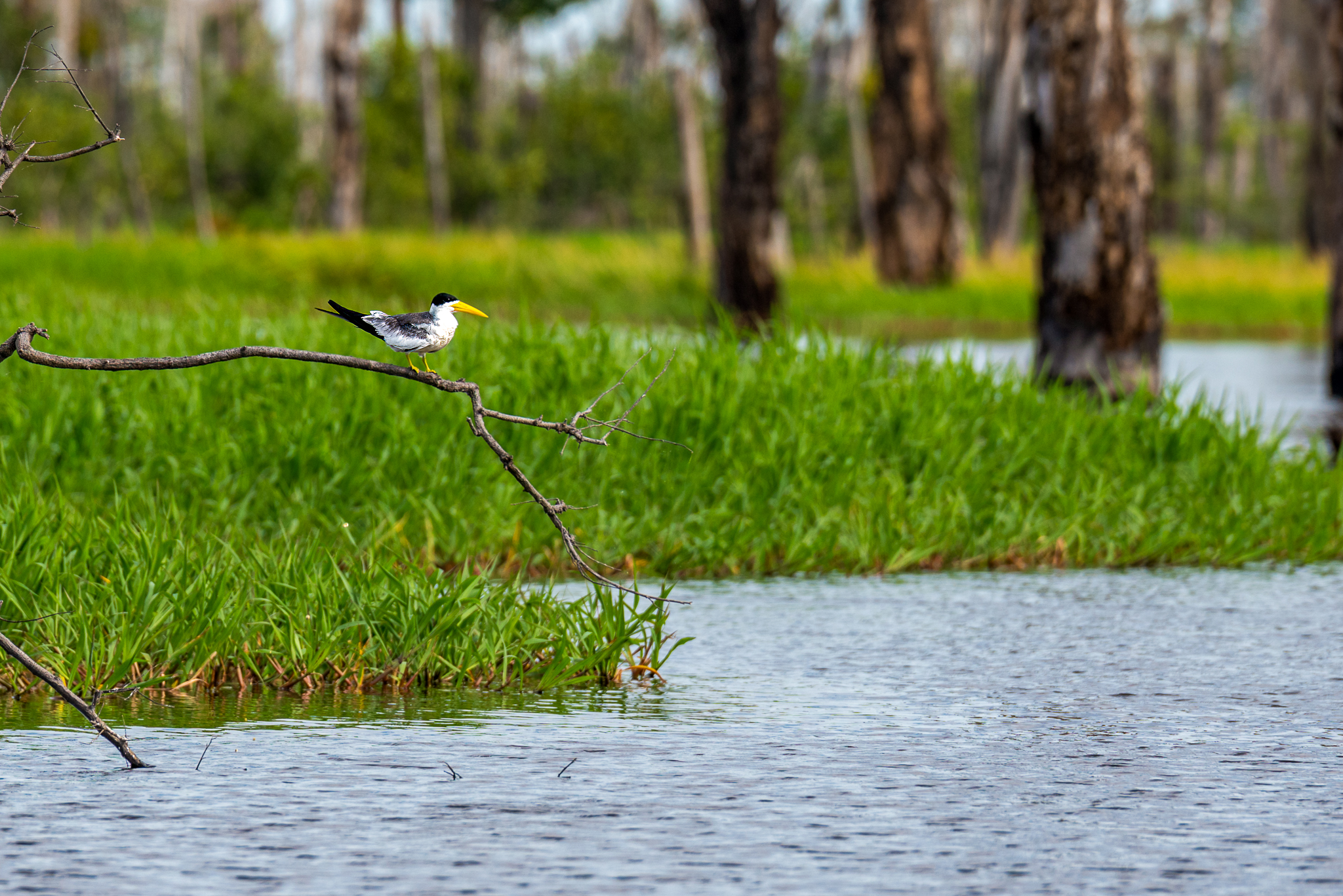

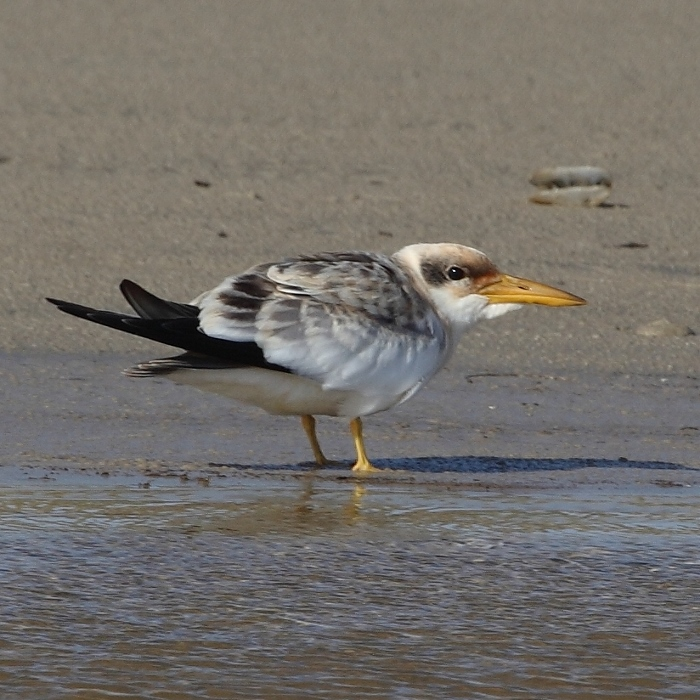
File:Phaetusa_simplex_-_Large-billed_Tern_(young).jpgJuvenile at Lagoa do Peixe National Park, Tavares, Rio Grande do Sul state, Brazil

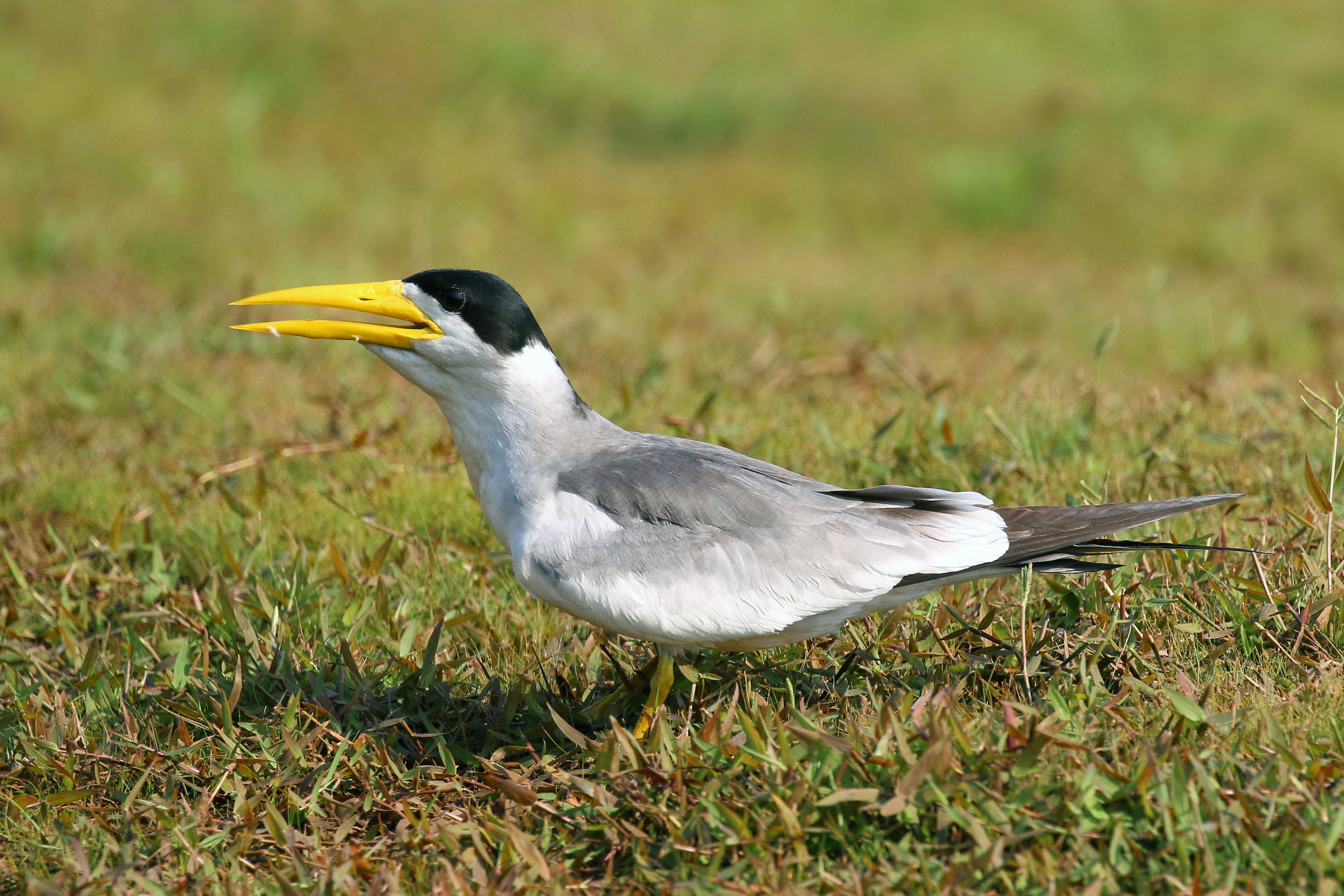
File:Large-billed_Tern_(Phaetusa_simplex),_Pantanal,_Brazil.jpgIn the Pantanal, Brazil

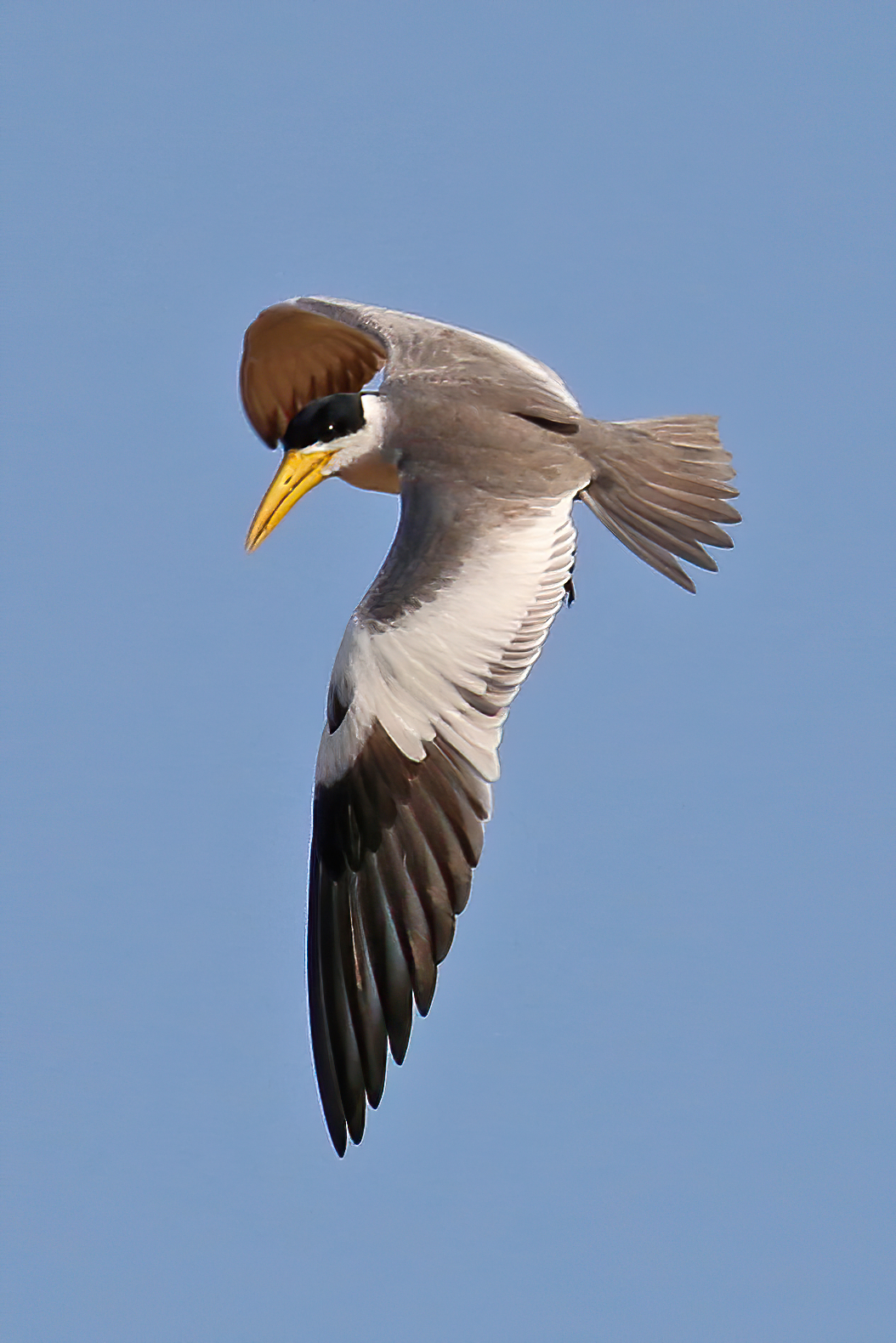
File:Large-billed_tern_(Phaetusa_simplex)_in_flight.JPGIn the Pantanal, Brazil

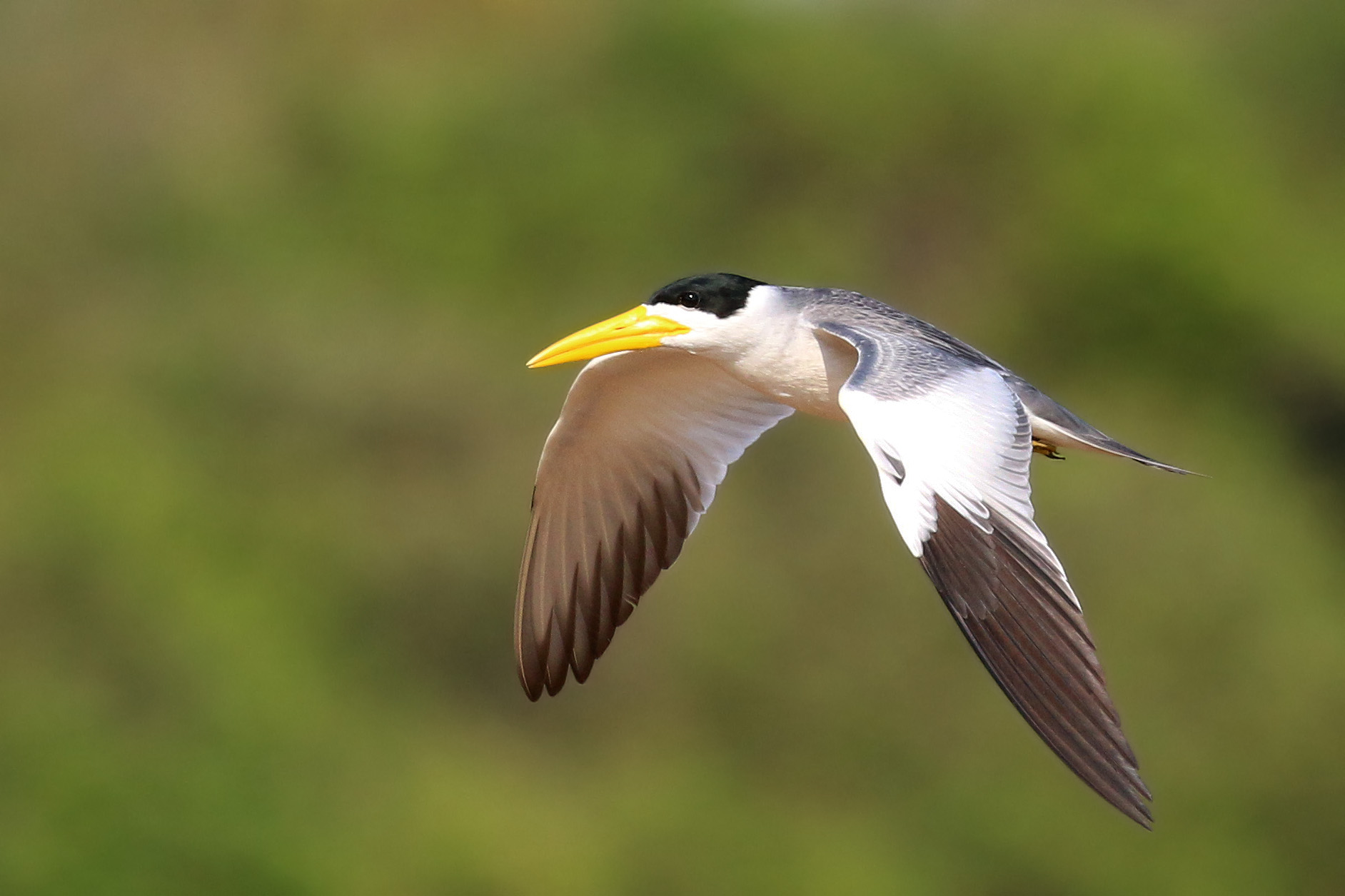
File:Large-billed_tern_(Phaetusa_simplex)_in_flight_2.JPGIn the Pantanal, Brazil
