= Alto Cariri National Park =

National park in Bahia, Brazil

- Parque Nacional do Alto Cariri
- IUCN category II (national park)
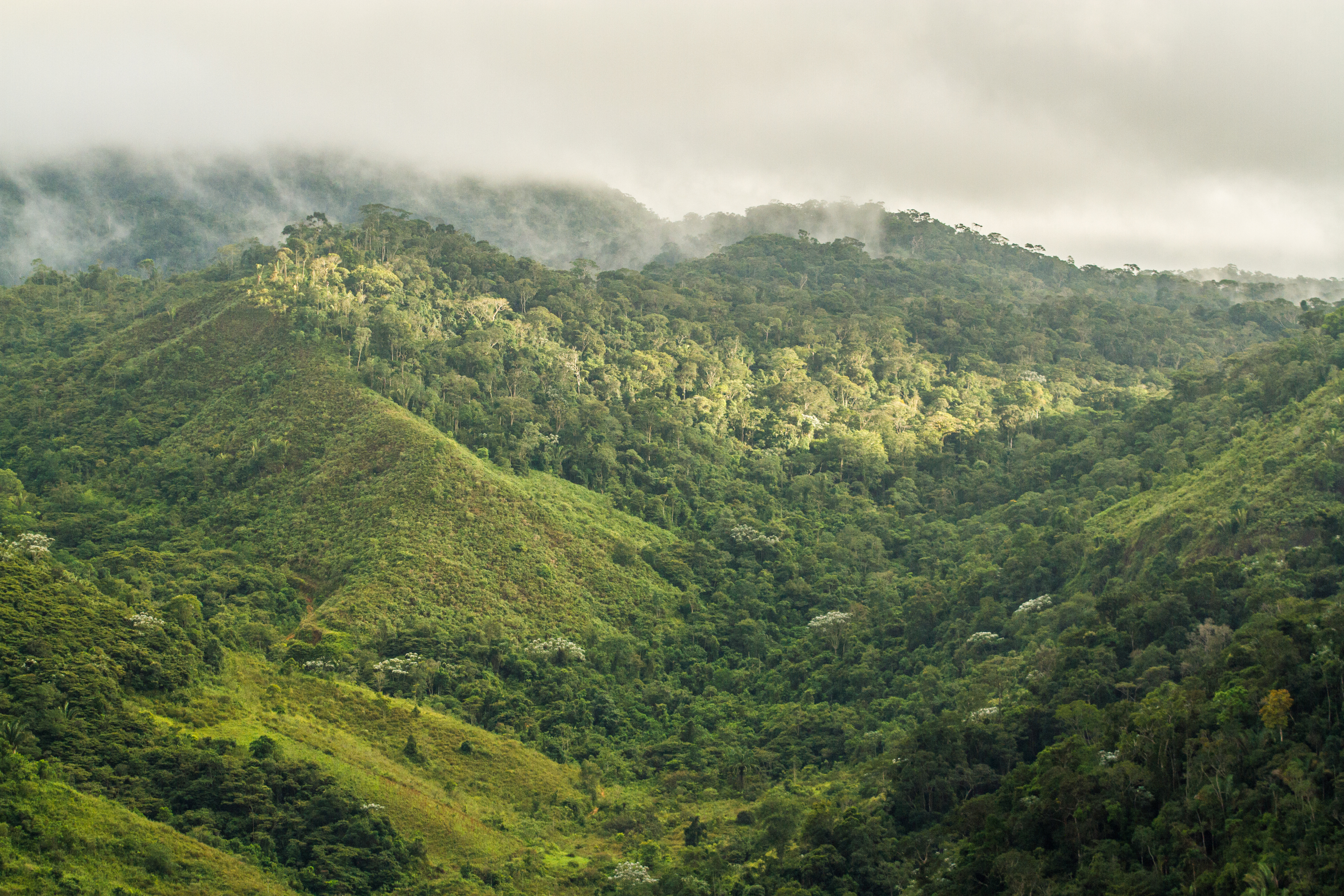
- Montane rainforest of the park Bahia

- Location within Brazil
- Nearest city: Eunápolis, Bahia
- Coordinates: 16.363°S 39.986°W
- Area: 19,238 ha (74.28 sq mi)
- Designation: National park
- Created: 11 June 2010
- Administrator: Chico Mendes Institute for Biodiversity Conservation

Alto Cariri National Park (Portuguese: Parque Nacional do Alto Cariri) is a national park in Brazil.

== Location ==
Alto Cariri National Park is in the municipality of Guaratinga, Bahia. It has an area of 19,238 hectares (47,540 acres).

The park is in the Atlantic Forest biome. The eastern side of the rugged Cariri massif is moist and dominated by montane rainforest. Further west it is drier and semi-deciduous forest gradually becomes dominant. In the northern portion of the Cariri massif the forests meet the deciduous forest of the Jequitinhonha depression. At the tops of the tallest and steepest hills there are stony fields with rock outcroppings, holding many species of bromeliads, orchids, cactuses and ferns. There are 35 species of amphibians, of which nine are endemic and four are new to science.

== Administration ==
Alto Cariri National Park was created by federal decree on 11 June 2010 with an approximate area of 19,264 hectares (47,600 acres). It became part of the Central Atlantic Forest Ecological Corridor, created in 2002. The park is classed as IUCN protected area category II (National Park). The objectives are to preserve the Alto Cariri mountain complex, ensure viable populations of endangered birds and animals, especially the northern muriqui (Brachyteles hypoxanthus) spider monkey, maintain and restore watersheds and waterways, support development of education and environmental interpretation, recreation in contact with nature, eco-tourism and scientific research. It is administered by the Chico Mendes Institute for Biodiversity Conservation.

== Sources ==
- Lamas, Ivana Reis; Crepaldi, Maria Otávia; Mesquita, Carlos Alberto Bernardo (2015), Uma Rede no Corredor (PDF) (in Portuguese), Conservação Internacional (CI-Brasil), ISBN 978-85-98830-28-5
- Parna do Alto Cariri (in Portuguese), Chico Mendes Institute for Biodiversity Conservation, archived from the original on 2019-08-25
- PARNA do Alto Cariri (in Portuguese), ISA: Instituto Socioambiental
- Unidade de Conservação: Parque Nacional do Alto Cariri (in Portuguese), MMA: Ministério do Meio Ambiente
