= Araguaia National Park =

National park in Tocantins, Brazil

- Parque Nacional do Araguaia
- IUCN category II (national park)
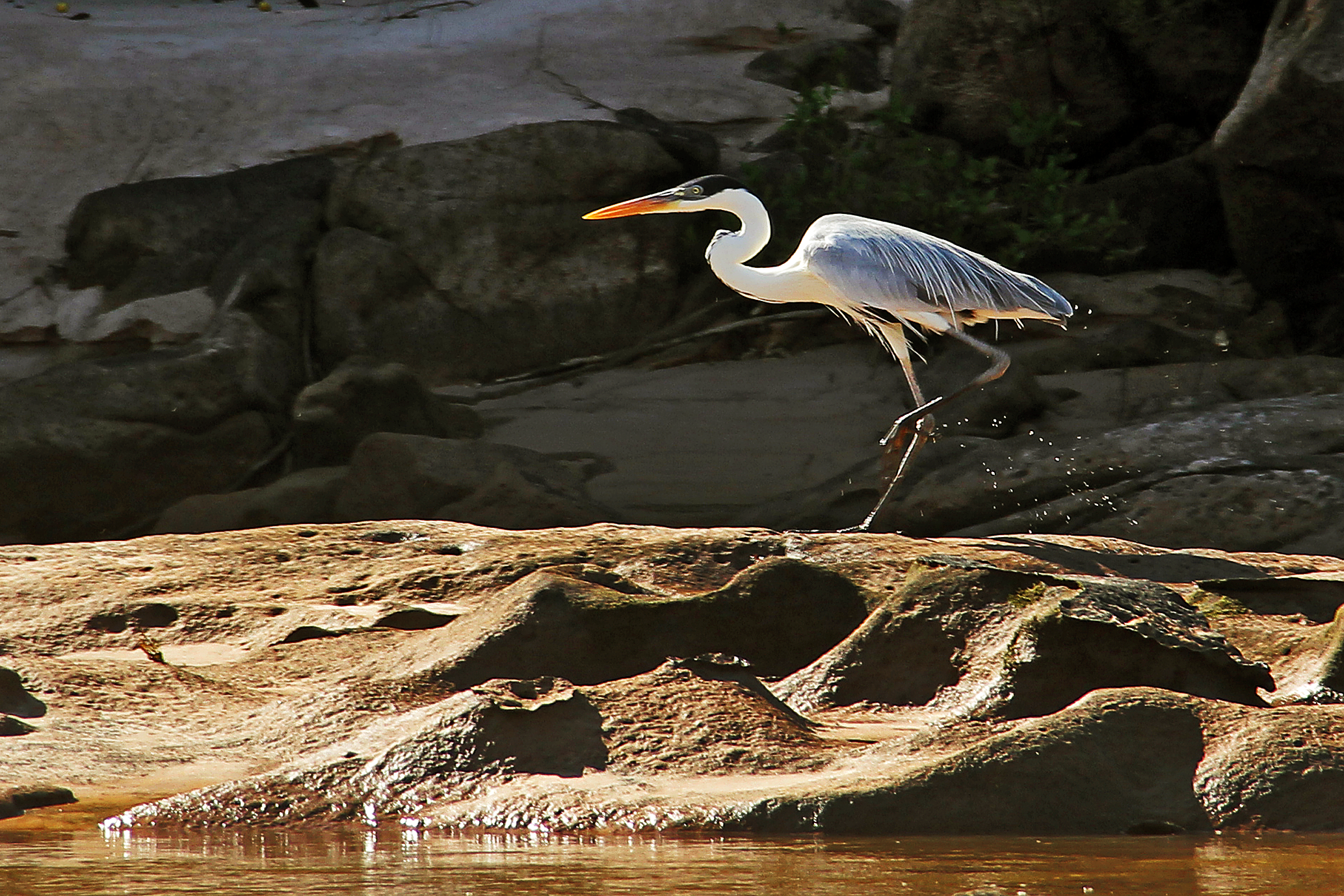
- Heron on the Araguaia River

- Location within Brazil
- Interactive map of Araguaia National Park
- Coordinates: 10.500°S 50.167°W
- Designation: National park
- Created: December 31, 1959; 66 years ago
- Administrator: ICMBio

The Araguaia National Park (Parque Nacional do Araguaia) is a national park located in Tocantins state in the north of Brazil, between 09º51’—11º11’S and 49º57’—50º27’W. Bananal Island, on which the park is located, is believed to be the largest inland river island in the world.

== History ==
The Araguaia National Park was created on 31 December 1959 by Federal Decree No. 45,570. The whole island is a nature and culture preserve, enacted on 19 December 1973 by Article 28 of the Statute of Indian Law No. 6001. The park is at the northern end of the island and has an area of 5,577 km^{2} (2,153 mi^{2}). The centre and south of the island is retained as a cultural preserve for indigenous peoples and has an area of 13,584 km^{2} (5,245 mi^{2}).

== Geography ==
The park forms part of the large river island of Bananal Island in the Araguaia River in the southwest of the state of Tocantins, in Brazil. The park is largely flat land and lies at an altitude of 200 to 240 m (656 to 787 ft) above sea level. It is situated at the junction of the Amazon biome to the north and the grassland and stunted woodland biome to the south; the river is subject to large fluctuations in level and the park is subject to periodic flooding. The flora consists of a mixture of savannah grassland, scrub and deciduous forest. Rainfall is most frequent between November and March and the hottest time of year is during September and October. The park would be in the proposed South Amazon Ecotones Ecological Corridor.

== Flora ==
There are piassava palms and buriti palms in parts of the park that are frequently inundated. In the forested areas some frequently encountered species include the cow tree, Cabralea, Tabebuia, Qualea parviflora, black sweetwood and genipap. In the drier savannah part of the park there are many species of grasses, with scattered trees such as the souari nut tree and the pau-d'alho.

== Fauna ==
There is a wide range of mammals in the park including marsh deer, other species of deer, peccary, capybara, giant anteater, maned wolf, jaguar, giant otter and armadillo. The reptiles present include the anaconda, spectacled caiman, black caiman and South American river turtle, and the rivers are home to many freshwater fish as well as Amazon river dolphins and Tucuxi dolphins. There are plenty of birds too, including the common toucan, anhinga, greater rhea, quail, partridge, osprey, Orinoco goose, heron. egret, Spix's macaw, hoatzin and musician wren.

== Sources ==
- Ayres, José Márcio; Da Fonseca, Gustavo A. B.; Rylands, Anthony B.; Queiroz, Helder L.; Pinto, Luiz Paulo; Masterson, Donald; Cavalcanti, Roberto B. (2005), Os Corredores Ecológicos das Florestas Tropicais do Brasil (PDF) (in Portuguese), Sociedade Civil Mamirauá, archived from the original (PDF) on 31 July 2016
