= National park (Brazil) =

Type of protected area in Brazilian law

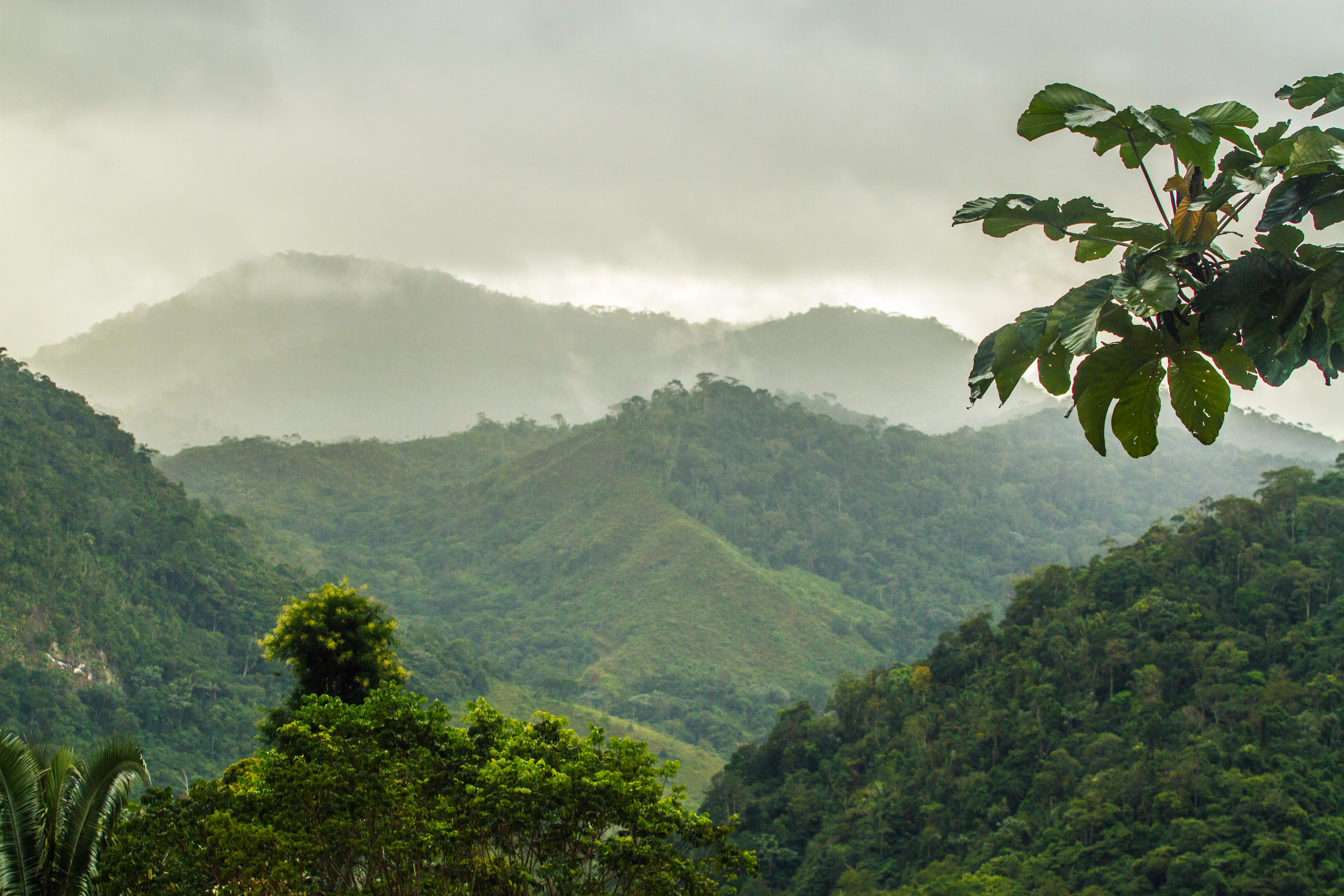
Alto Cariri National Park, Bahia

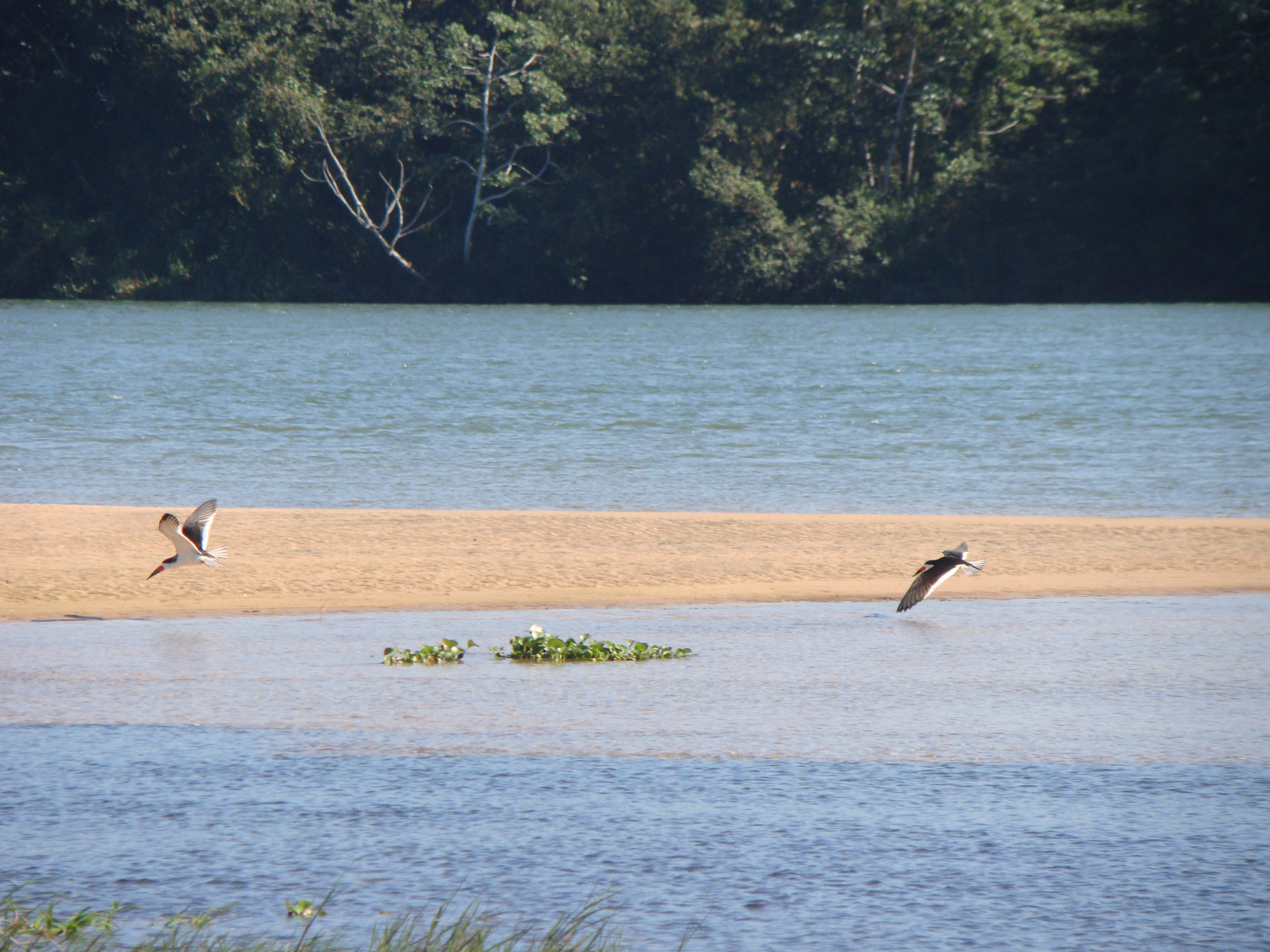
Ilha Grande National Park

National Parks (Portuguese: Parques nacionais) are a legally defined type of protected area of Brazil. The first parks were created in the 1930s with other parks being gradually added, typically protecting a natural monument such as a waterfall or gorge near to a coastal population centre. At least two early parks were later submerged by hydroelectric reservoirs. The first park in the Amazon rainforest was inaugurated in 1974. Today the national parks cover a huge area, particularly in the Amazon. However, many of them suffer from outstanding claims for compensation from former owners or users of the land, and many lack the management plans, physical infrastructure and personnel needed to support public visits. The responsible government agency does not have the capacity to provide services such as food and drink, souvenir sales and guided tours, and bureaucracy has delayed letting the private sector bid on providing such services.

== Definition ==
National parks are the oldest type of protected area in Brazil. National parks are very important for our rainforest and other areas. Their goal is to preserve ecosystems of great ecological importance and scenic beauty, and to support scientific research, education, environmental interpretation, recreation and eco-tourism through contact with nature. At the federal level the parks are managed by the Chico Mendes Institute for Biodiversity Conservation. State parks fall under the same regulations as national parks. Both types are now defined by law 9.985 of July 2000. They are classed as IUCN protected area category II.

The parks are publicly owned, and any privately owned land within their boundary must be expropriated. Existing landowners and communities with land use rights have to be relocated and given compensation. With strictly limited budgets, poor land records and inefficient bureaucracy it can take many years to complete this process.

Conditions for public visits are defined in the park's management plan. Officially a park may not be visited by the public unless it has a management plan and public use plan. Scientific research requires prior authorization from the responsible agency and is subject to conditions and restrictions.

== History ==
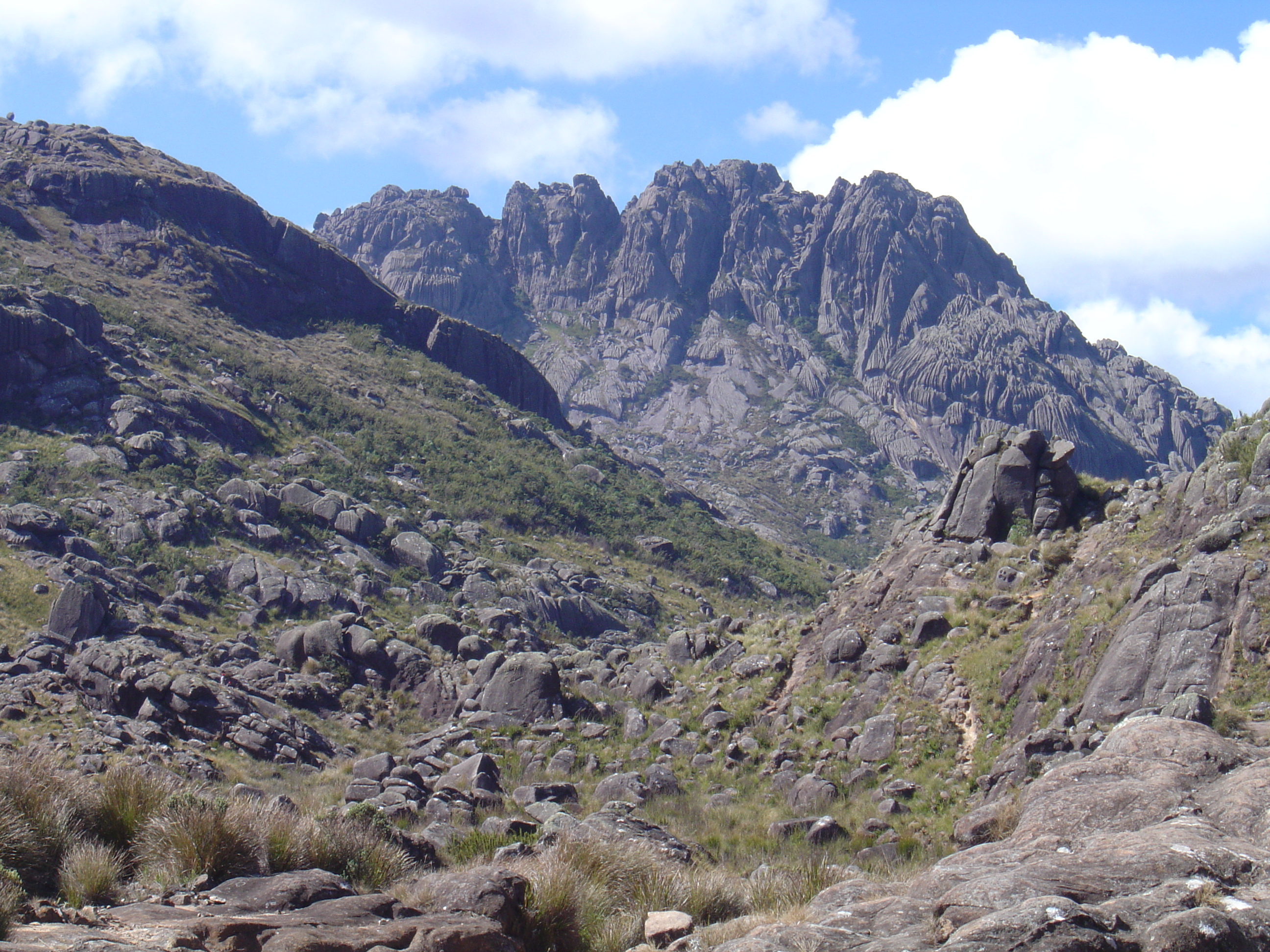
Pico das Agulhas Negras in the Itatiaia National Park

The concept of "national park" was first defined in the 1934 forest code. The system of national parks started in 1937 with the creation of Itatiaia National Park. Another two national parks were created in 1939, then after a period of 20 years, the program of park creation was restarted in the late 1950s. The Ubajara National Park was created in 1959, protecting a limestone cave in the semi-arid caatinga biome of the north east. The Paulo Afonso and Sete Quedas national parks were created in 1948 and 1961 respectively to let visitors see exceptional waterfalls and rapids. Although all countries define national parks as permanent, Brazil violated this principle and submerged the features under the dams of hydroelectric power plants.

The forest code was revised in 1965 to cover all types of native vegetation, not just "forests". National parks and the newly defined biological reserves were defined as having the goal of "protecting exceptional natural attributes, reconciling the full protection of flora, fauna and natural beauties with the use for educational, recreational and scientific purposes". Under the 1934 and 1965 codes the parks and other conservation units have been created by executive decree. As a result, Congress has tended not to give strong support to the parks, but they have been protected against ongoing congressional attempts to shrink or eliminate the parks.

Many of the parks have their origins in federal or state forestry reserves used for a variety of research or conservation purposes, then donated to the federal government to become national parks. The effect of this random development was that by the late 1970s many of the parks were near coastal population centres. The Emas, Chapada dos Veadeiros, Brasília and Araguaia parks were in the interior, but situated where they could be used for leisure by government workers in Brasilia, which had become the national capital in 1960. The Amazônia National Park was created in 1974 on the Tapajós River, the first in the Amazon. It was designed to be accessible via the trans-Amazonian highway, which ran through the park. By 1978 there were eighteen national parks, of which nine were in the coastal Atlantic Forest biome near to large cities, typically including a monumental feature as the main attraction.

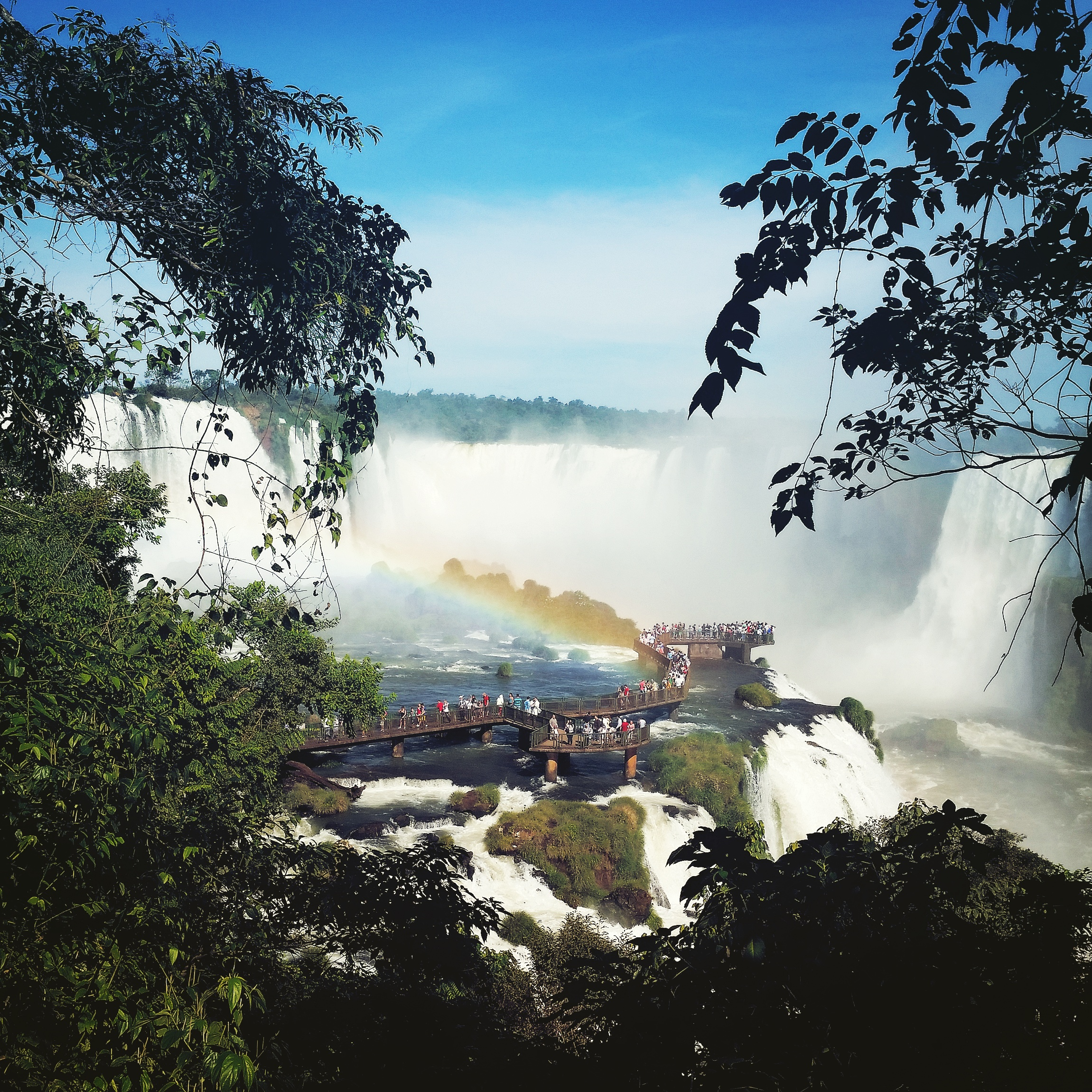
Visitors in the Iguaçu National Park

Since then the number of parks increased steadily to 33 by 1990 and 64 by 2010. These 64 parks cover 240,000 square kilometres (93,000 sq mi). The largest are in the Amazon biome of the north and west of the country. It is costly to compensate former owners or people with usage rights and to prepare management plans. Funding is limited so many parks remained inaccessible to the public. Another issue is the cost of providing infrastructure and personnel to supervise visitors. Finally, for many years a park that generated income from visitors did not receive any benefit.

In 1998 the Iguaçu National Park experimented with outsourcing public use services, causing a rise in visitor numbers. The private concessions in the Foz do Iguacu National Park allowed construction of a visitor centre, parking spaces, food and beverage services, transport service in the park and leisure and adventures activities. The experiment was not repeated elsewhere for several years.

== Recent years ==
Between 2006 and 2013 the number of visits to federal protected areas, mostly to national parks, tripled to 6.3 million. In 2007 the Chico Mendes Institute for Biodiversity Conservation (ICMBio) was created to manage federal conservation units, including national parks, taking over from the Brazilian Institute of Environment and Renewable Natural Resources (IBAMA). More funds were made available for settling expropriation claims, and a system of environmental compensation was introduced to support investment in parks. The result has been growth in the number of parks with management plans and clear land ownership. These may qualify for outsourced public use services. Private concessions have been used in parks such as Tijuca and Fernando de Noronha, and more are planned.

Of the 67 national parks in 2010, 19 protected an area that represents 5% of the original Amazon rainforest, and another 22 protected 1% of the original Atlantic Forest. Seven parks protected the Caatinga ecoregion and twelve the Cerrado ecoregion. There were only six coastal and marine parks, including one that protected the Pantanal wetland. No park protected the Pampas. Most protected areas created in the 2000s had the primary goal of reducing deforestation, and little effort has been made to promote public use. A 2012 survey showed that only 44% of Brazilians knew what a protected area was, and only 1% of those knew their purpose was to promote tourism and recreation.

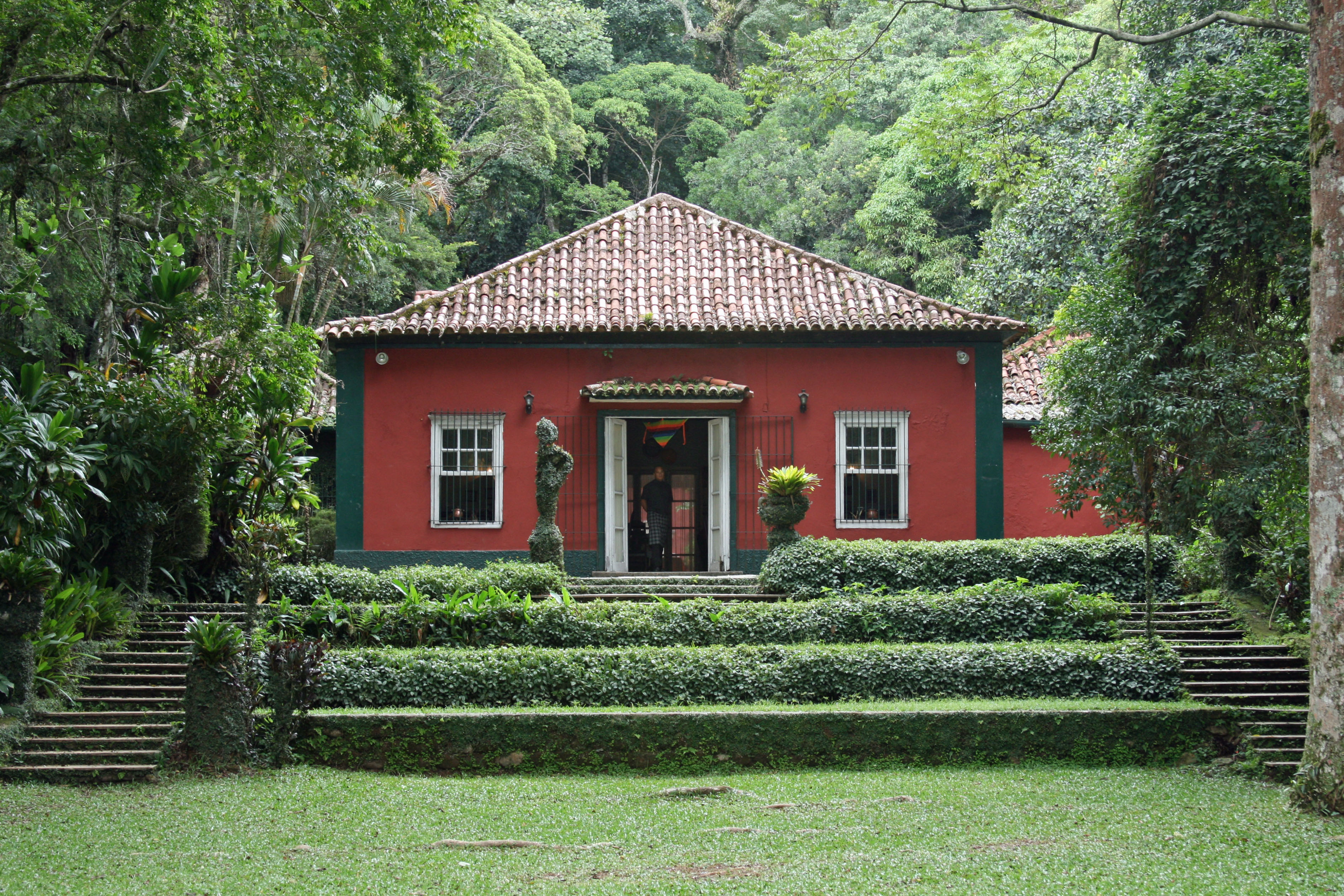
Home of the Baron of Escragnolle, now a restaurant in the Tijuca Forest park, Rio de Janeiro

The parks vary greatly in size between the 3,300 hectares (8,200 acres) Tijuca Forest in Rio de Janeiro and the 3,800,000 hectares (9,400,000 acres) Tumucumaque Mountains National Park in the Amazon. By 2010 only 30 parks were accessible to the public. Of these, the two most visited were the Tijuca with 1.7 million visitors and the Iguaçu with 1 million visitors, together accounting for 71% of all visits to national parks in Brazil in 2009. In 2011 it was estimated that the potential revenue from Brazil's national parks could be around R$1.7 billion annually by 2016. In 2012 ICMBio earned R$24 million from entrance fees and services, mostly from just four parks. As of 2012 there were 68 national parks but only 26 were officially open to visitors. Some of the others received visitors informally. Chapada dos Veadeiros National Park illustrates the problem. It is a World Heritage Site and has unique cerrado vegetation and hundreds of waterfalls and other bodies of water. Just 22,950 tourists visited the park in 2009. There is only one park entrance, and very limited tourist infrastructure. ICMBio does not charge an entrance fee, and is unable to sell food, drinks and souvenirs. Bureaucratic problems have delayed opening these services to private enterprise.

== Map ==
National parks of Brazil

== List of parks ==
	Name	Year	Area (km^{2})	State	Biome
1	Abrolhos Marine National Park	1983	688	Bahia	Coastal marine
2	Acari National Park	2016	8,964	Amazonas	Amazon
3	Alto Cariri National Park	2010	182	Bahia	Atlantic Forest
4	Amazônia National Park	1974	9,940	Amazonas / Pará	Amazon
5	Anavilhanas National Park	1981	3,505	Amazonas	Amazon
6	Aparados da Serra National Park	1959	102	Rio Grande do Sul / Santa Catarina	Atlantic Forest
7	Araguaia National Park	1959	5,623	Tocantins	Amazon
8	Araucárias National Park	2005	128	Santa Catarina	Atlantic Forest
9	Boa Nova National Park	2010	142	Bahia	Atlantic Forest
10	Brasília National Park	1961	300	Distrito Federal	Cerrado
11	Cabo Orange National Park	1980	6,190	Amapá	Amazon
12	Campos Amazônicos National Park	2006	8,760	Rondônia	Amazon
13	Campos Gerais National Park	2006	215	Paraná	Atlantic Forest
14	Caparaó National Park	1961	318	Espírito Santo/Minas Gerais	Atlantic Forest
15	Catimbau National Park	2002	623	Pernambuco	Caatinga
16	Cavernas do Peruaçu National Park	1999	568	Minas Gerais	Cerrado
17	Chapada das Mesas National Park	2005	1,600	Maranhão	Cerrado
18	Chapada Diamantina National Park	1985	1,520	Bahia	Caatinga
19	Chapada dos Guimarães National Park	1989	330	Mato Grosso	Pantanal
20	Chapada dos Veadeiros National Park	1961	600	Goiás	Cerrado
21	Descobrimento National Park	1999	211	Bahia	Atlantic Forest
22	Emas National Park	1961	1,318	Goiás	Cerrado
23	Fernando de Noronha Marine National Park	1988	112	Pernambuco	Coastal marine
24	Furna Feia National Park	2012	85	Rio Grande do Norte	Caatinga
25	Grande Sertão Veredas National Park	1989	833	Bahia / Minas Gerais	Cerrado
26	Guaricana National Park	2014	493	Paraná	Atlantic Forest
27	Iguaçu National Park	1939	1,852	Paraná	Atlantic Forest
28	Ilha Grande National Park	1997	788	Mato Grosso do Sul / Paraná	Pantanal
29	Ilhas dos Currais Marine National Park	2013	1,360	Paraná	Coastal marine
30	Itatiaia National Park	1937	300	Minas Gerais / Rio de Janeiro	Atlantic Forest
31	Jamanxim National Park	2006	8,597	Pará	Amazon
32	Jaú National Park	1980	22,720	Amazonas	Amazon
33	Jericoacoara National Park	2002	200	Ceará	Coastal marine
34	Jurubatiba Sandbank National Park	1996	148	Rio de Janeiro	Coastal marine
35	Juruena National Park	2006	19,602	Amazonas / Mato Grosso	Amazon
36	Lagoa do Peixe National Park	1986	344	Rio Grande do Sul	Coastal marine
37	Lençóis Maranhenses National Park (location on map incorrect)	1981	1,550	Maranhão	Coastal marine
38	Mapinguari National Park	2008	15,624	Rondônia	Amazon
39	Monte Pascoal National Park	1961	225	Bahia	Atlantic Forest
40	Monte Roraima National Park	1989	1,160	Roraima	Amazon
41	Nascentes do Lago Jari National Park	2008	8,121	Amazonas	Amazon
42	Nascentes do Rio Parnaíba National Park	2002	7,298	Bahia / Maranhão / Piauí / Tocantins	Cerrado
43	Pacaás Novos National Park	1979	7,658	Rondônia	Amazon
44	Pantanal Matogrossense National Park	1971	1,350	Mato Grosso / Mato Grosso do Sul	Pantanal
45	Pau Brasil National Park	2000	115	Bahia	Atlantic Forest
46	Pedra Azul National Park	1991	1,240	Espírito Santo	
47	Pico da Neblina National Park	1979	22,526	Amazonas	Amazon
48	Pontões Capixabas National Park	2002	17,443	Espírito Santo	Atlantic Forest
49	Rio Novo National Park	2006	5,382	Pará	Amazon
50	Saint-Hilaire/Lange National Park	2001	245	Paraná	Atlantic Forest
51	São Joaquim National Park	1961	493	Santa Catarina	Atlantic Forest
52	Sempre Vivas National Park	2002	1,245	Minas Gerais	Cerrado
53	Serra da Bocaina National Park	1974	1,318	Rio de Janeiro / São Paulo	Atlantic Forest
54	Serra da Bodoquena National Park	2000	764	Mato Grosso do Sul	Cerrado
55	Serra da Canastra National Park	1972	2,000	Minas Gerais	Cerrado
56	Serra da Capivara National Park	1979	979	Piauí	Atlantic Forest
57	Serra do Cipó National Park	1984	310	Minas Gerais	Cerrado
58	Serra das Confusões National Park	1998	8,234	Piauí	Caatinga
59	Serra da Cutia National Park	2001	2,836	Rondônia	Amazon
60	Serra do Divisor National Park	1989	8,430	Acre	Amazon
61	Serra do Gandarela National Park	2014	313	Minas Gerais	Atlantic Forest
62	Serra de Itabaiana National Park	2005	79	Sergipe	Atlantic Forest
63	Serra do Itajaí National Park	2004	573	Santa Catarina	Atlantic Forest
64	Serra das Lontras National Park	2010	113	Bahia	Atlantic Forest
65	Serra da Mocidade National Park	1998	805	Roraima	Amazon
66	Serra dos Órgãos National Park	1939	110	Rio de Janeiro	Atlantic Forest
67	Serra do Pardo National Park	2005	4,473	Pará	Amazon
68	Serra Geral National Park	1992	173	Rio Grande do Sul / Santa Catarina	Atlantic Forest
69	Sete Cidades National Park	1961	62	Piauí	Caatinga
70	Superagui National Park	1989	210	Paraná	Coastal marine
71	Tijuca National Park	1961	39	Rio de Janeiro	Atlantic Forest
72	Tumucumaque Mountains National Park	2002	38,874	Amapá / Pará	Amazon
73	Ubajara National Park	1959	62	Ceará	Caatinga
74	Vale do Catimbau National Park	2002	623	Pernambuco	Caatinga
75	Viruá National Park	1998	2,159	Roraima	Amazon
76	Xingu National Park	1961	26,420	Mato Grosso	Amazon

== See also ==
- Conservation in Brazil

== Sources ==
- Ariane Janér (2010), The National Parks of Brazil, EcoBrasil - Brazilian Ecotourism Association
- Categorias (in Portuguese), Chico Mendes Institute for Biodiversity Conservation, archived from the original on 2016-07-13
- Howkins, Adrian; Orsi, Jared; Fiege, Mark (2016-03-31), National Parks beyond the Nation: Global Perspectives on "America's Best Idea", University of Oklahoma Press, ISBN 978-0-8061-5474-9
- Lei No 9.985, de 18 de Julho de 2000 (in Portuguese), Presidência da República - Casa Civil- Subchefia para Assuntos Jurídicos, 18 July 2000
- National Parks, Brazil Travel
- OECD (2015-11-04), OECD Environmental Performance Reviews OECD Environmental Performance Reviews: Brazil 2015, OECD Publishing, ISBN 978-92-64-24009-4
- Parques (in Portuguese), ISA: Instituto Socioambiental
