= Brasília National Park =

National park in Goiás, Brazil

- IUCN category II (national park)
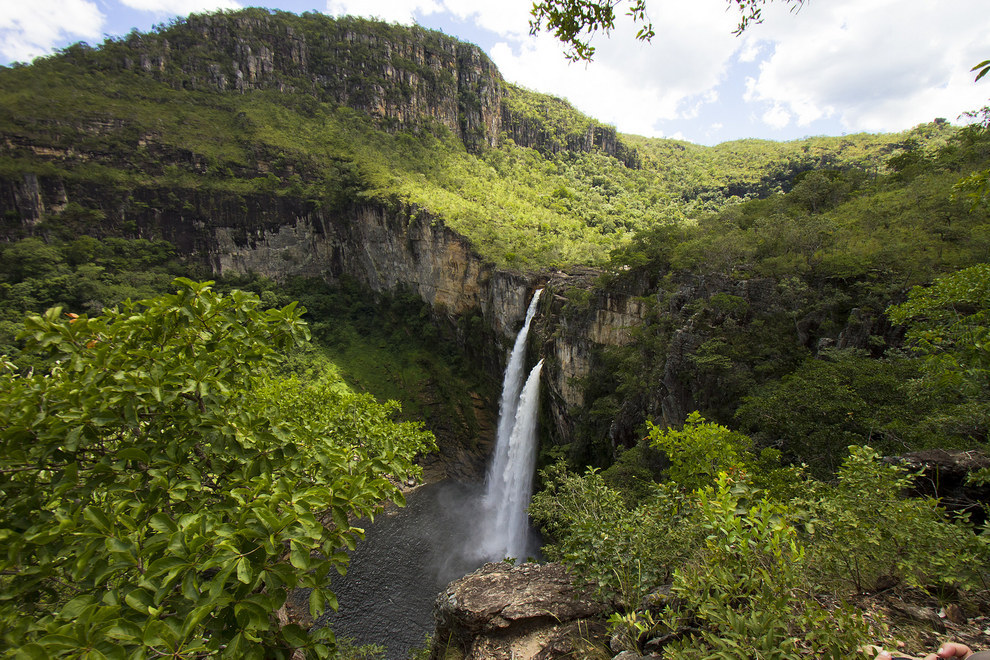
- Brasília National Park

- Location within Brazil
- Coordinates: 15.738056°S 47.926667°W
- Area: 423.83 km ²
- Designation: National park
- Established: November 29, 1961

The Brasília National Park (Parque Nacional de Brasília), also known as Água Mineral, is a national park located in the northwest of the Federal District and in the center of the state of Goiás, in the Brazil. The park covers an area of 423.83 square kilometres (163.64 sq mi), with territory distributed by the administrative regions of Brazlândia, Brasília and Sobradinho, in the Federal District and by the municipality of Padre Bernardo, in Goiás. It is administered by the Chico Mendes Institute for Biodiversity Conservation (ICMBio). It is the largest park in an urbanized area in the world.

== History ==
The creation of the park, on November 29, 1961, was under Federal Decree of Brazil covering an area of 28,000 hectares (69,000 acres) (initially 30,000 hectares (74,000 acres) was proposed) extending over an elevation range of 700–1,300 metres (2,300–4,300 ft). It is under IUCN Category II. It is directly related to the development of Brasília. According to the Ministry of Agriculture, the park was protected to provide forested area around the national capital of Brazil. In 1994, seventy percent of the park burned.

== Geography ==
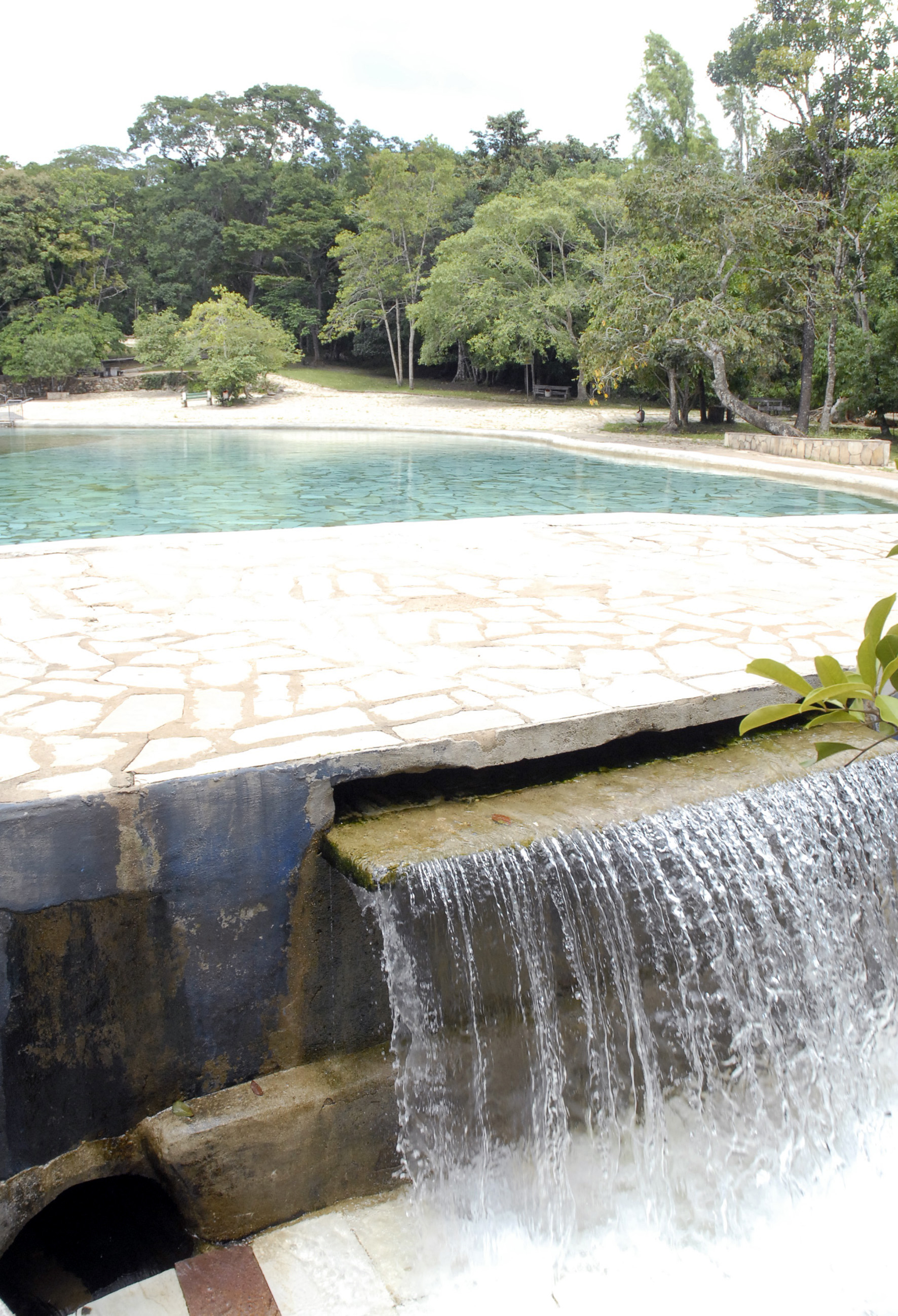
Reservoir within the park

The park is in the northwest of the Federal District in the center-west region of Brazil. Its boundaries have been fixed and also fenced. The park is divided into Intangible, Primitive, Extensive, Intensive, Special and Recuperation zones from the development perspective.

The terrain is an undulating plateau with geological formations of quartzites and limestones. It has many caves and several springs. Apart from the springs, the source of water supply to the park is also through a reservoir. The most prominent features of the park are the pools formed from water wells. Several creeks flow through the park, including the Bananal, Torto, and Santa Maria Creeks. Because of the large number of springs, its nickname is Agua Mineral (mineral water); the water is reported to have healing properties. There are many trekking trails through the park.

== Climate ==
The climate of the region, according to the Köppen classification, is "tropical savanna". The rainy season begins in October and ends in April, representing 84% of the annual total. The wettest quarter is from November to January, and December is the month with the highest rainfall of the year. The dry season is from May to September, and in the driest quarter is June, July, and August, when precipitation represents only 2% of the annual total. In terms of total annual average rainfall, Federal District varies between 1,200–1,700 millimetres (47–67 in). The park itself has an average annual rainfall incidence of 1,675 mm (65.9 in). Average annual temperature reported is 20.6 °C (69.1 °F). Eastern winds are dominant in the park.

== Flora ==
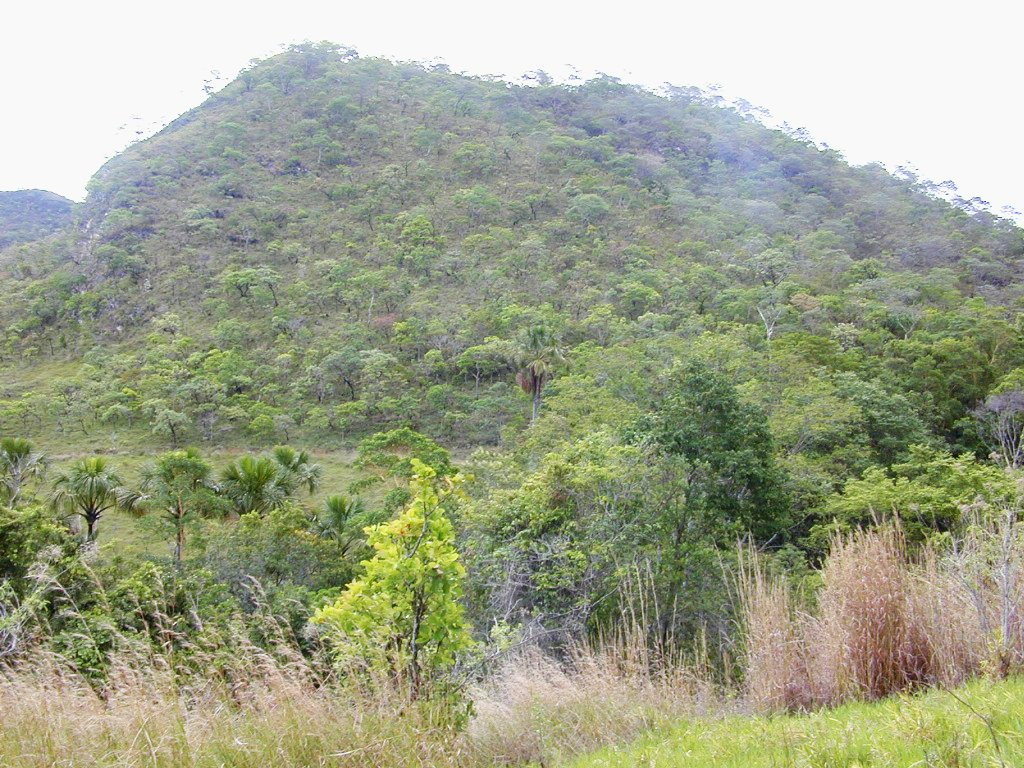
Cerrado forests in the park

Cerrado or upland savanna trees, the dominant vegetation in the central regions of Brazil, form the core area of this park. However, the vegetation around the springs and streams are of Campo Cerrado type, which consists of gallery forests. These areas fall under the biosphere reserve declared by UNESCO. The plant species reported from the park are buriti palm and many species of the Velloziaceae (a family of monocotyledonous flowering plants. The park has established a forest tree nursery and also runs a centre for environmental education.

== Fauna ==
The faunal species reported from the park are: maned wolf (Chrysocyon brachyurus), pampas deer (Ozotoceros bezoarticus), giant anteater (Myrmecophaga tridactyla), bush dog (Speothos venaticus), giant otter (Pteronura brasiliensis), giant armadillo (Priodontes giganteus), black howler monkey (Alouatta caraya), forest rabbit (Sylvilagus brasiliensis), Juscelinomys candangus, cavy (Galea spixii), Calhartes burrovianus urubutinga, Mussurana (Portuguese muçurana) and tegu (Tupinambis teguixin). Also reported are black-tufted marmoset (Callithrix penicillata), capybara, jaguar, wild pig and puma.

Birds include greater rhea (Rhea americana), red-legged seriema (Cariama cristata), osprey (Pandion haliaetus), king vulture (Sarcoramphus papa), solitary eagle (Buteogallus coronatus), seed finches, Oryzoborus crassirostris, O. angloensis, spotted tinamou (Nothura maculosa), lesser yellow-headed vulture (Cathartes burrovianus), curl-crested jay (Cyanocorax cristatellus), fer-de-lance (Bothrops jararaca), burrowing owl (Athene cunicularia), and toco toucan (Ramphastos toco).
