= Jurubatiba Sandbank National Park =

National park in Rio de Janeiro, Brazil

- Parque Nacional da Restinga de Jurubatiba
- IUCN category II (national park)
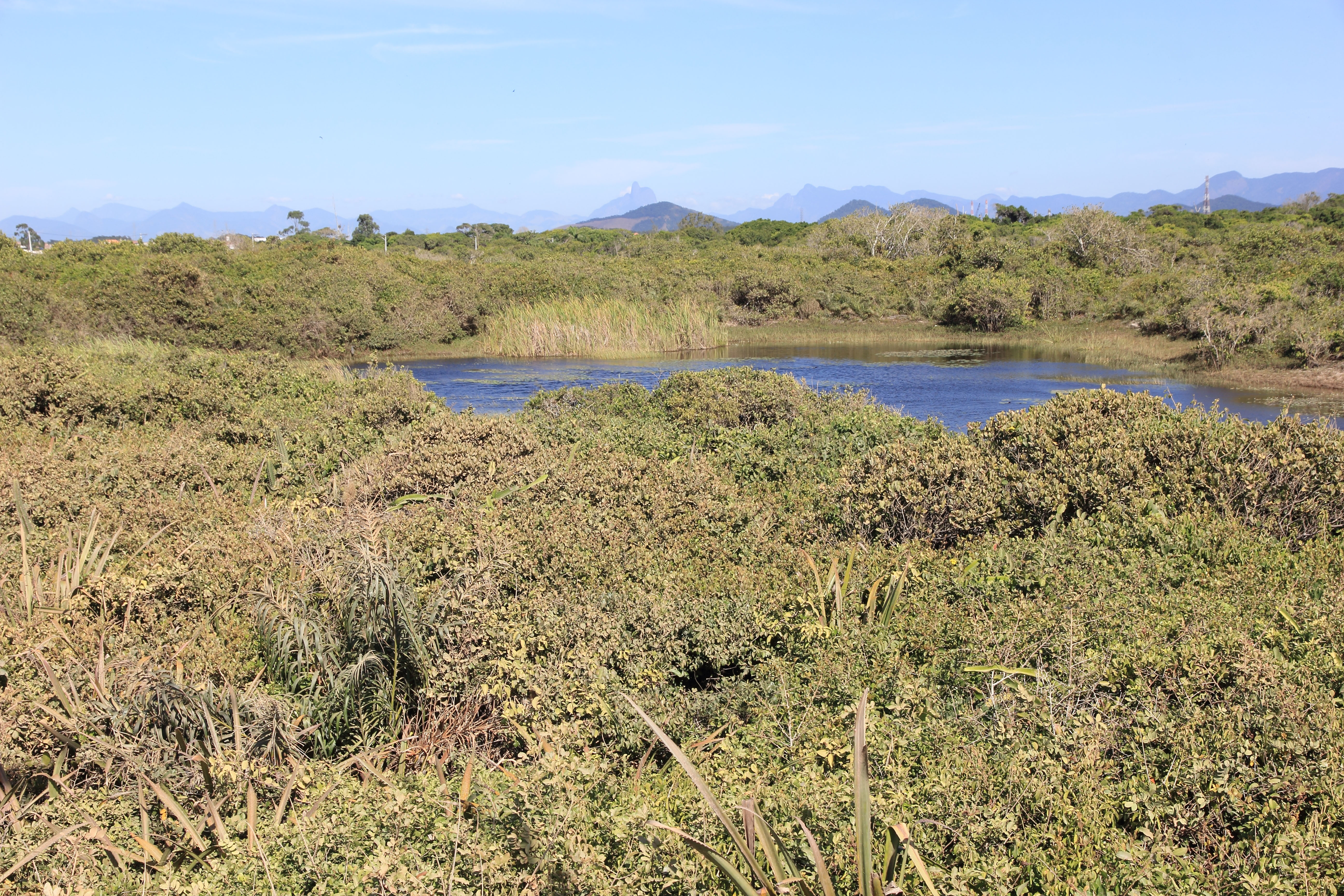
- Park in 2014

- Location within Brazil
- Nearest city: Campos dos Goytacazes, Rio de Janeiro
- Coordinates: 22.201°S 41.493°W
- Designation: National park
- Created: 29 July 1998
- Administrator: ICMBio

The Jurubatiba Sandbank National Park (Portuguese: Parque Nacional da Restinga de Jurubatiba) is a national park in the Brazilian state of Rio de Janeiro. The park has approximately 44 kilometres of sandbank coast.

== History ==
The park was created on 29 April 1998. It spreads along the coast of Quissamã, Carapebus and Macaé municipalities. More than 60% of its area are inside the Quissamã municipality, around 30% inside Carapebus and the rest in Macaé.

== Geography ==
Area: 148.6 km^{2}
