= Lagoa do Peixe National Park =

National park in Rio Grande do Sul, Brazil

- Parque Nacional da Lagoa do Peixe
- IUCN category II (national park)
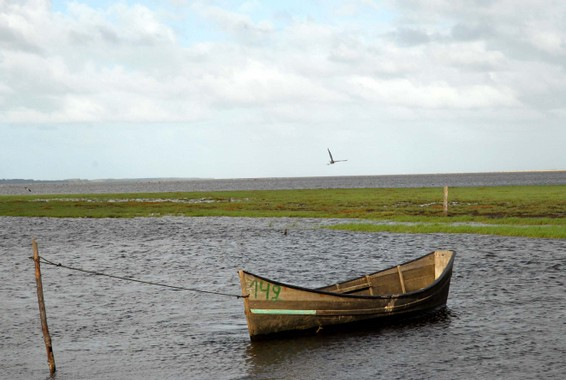
- Lagoa do Peixe National Park

- Location within Brazil
- Nearest city: Porto Alegre
- Coordinates: 31°14′28″S 50°57′32″W
- Area: 36,721 hectares (90,740 acres)
- Designation: National park
- Created: 6 November 1986
- Administrator: ICMBio

Ramsar Wetland
- Official name: Lagoa do Peixe
- Designated: 24 May 1993
- Reference no.: 603

Lagoa do Peixe National Park (Portuguese: Parque Nacional da Lagoa do Peixe) is a national park in the state of Rio Grande do Sul, Brazil. It was created in 1986 to protect a wintering zone for migratory birds along the Lagoa dos Patos, the estuary of the Guaiba river or Guaíba Lake about 200 kilometres (120 mi) south of Porto Alegre.

== Location ==
The Lagoa do Peixe National Park is in the coastal marine biome, and has been registered as a Ramsar Site. It has an area of 36,721 hectares (90,740 acres). The park was created by decree nº 93.546 of 6 November 1986, and is administered by the Chico Mendes Institute for Biodiversity Conservation. It covers parts of the municipalities of Mostardas, São José do Norte and Tavares in the state of Rio Grande do Sul.

== Environment ==
The park lies on and between two parallel lines of dunes on the Atlantic coast. It is 35 kilometres (22 mi) long and on average 1 kilometre (0.62 mi) wide. Altitudes range from sea level to 17 metres (56 ft). There are two fresh water lagoons in the northern section, Veiana and Pai João, while other lagoons and marshes are salt. The park includes areas influenced by rivers or lakes, marine areas and intermediate areas, and has a mix of flora growing on the dunes, sandy fields, flood plains and salt and freshwater marshes. Average annual rainfall is 1,250 millimetres (49 in). Temperatures range from 0 to 40 °C (32 to 104 °F), with an average of 21 °C (70 °F).

The park is an important resting place for birds on the migratory route between Patagonia and the United States. Migratory species include red knot (Calidris canutus), common tern (Sterna hirundo), sanderling (Calidris alba), white-rumped sandpiper (Calidris fuscicollis), two-banded plover (Charadrius falklandicus), tawny-throated dotterel (Oreopholus ruficollis), rufous-chested plover (Charadrius modestus), Chilean flamingo (Phoenicopterus chilensis) and Andean flamingo (Phoenicoparrus andinus). The tuco-tuco (Ctenomys flamarioni) is endemic.

== Conservation ==
The park is classified as IUCN protected area category II (national park). The basic objectives are preservation of natural ecosystems of great ecological relevance and scenic beauty and enabling scientific research, environmental education, outdoor recreation and eco-tourism. On 16 April 1991 the park was recognized as an International Reserve of the Western Hemisphere Shorebird Reserve Network. On 24 May 1993 it was registered as Ramsar Site No. 603. In 1999 it became an outpost of the Atlantic Forest Biosphere Reserve in Rio Grande do Sul.

Protected species in the park include cinereous harrier (Circus cinereus), Olrog's gull (Larus atlanticus), dot-winged crake (Porzana spiloptera) and royal tern (Thalasseus maximus).

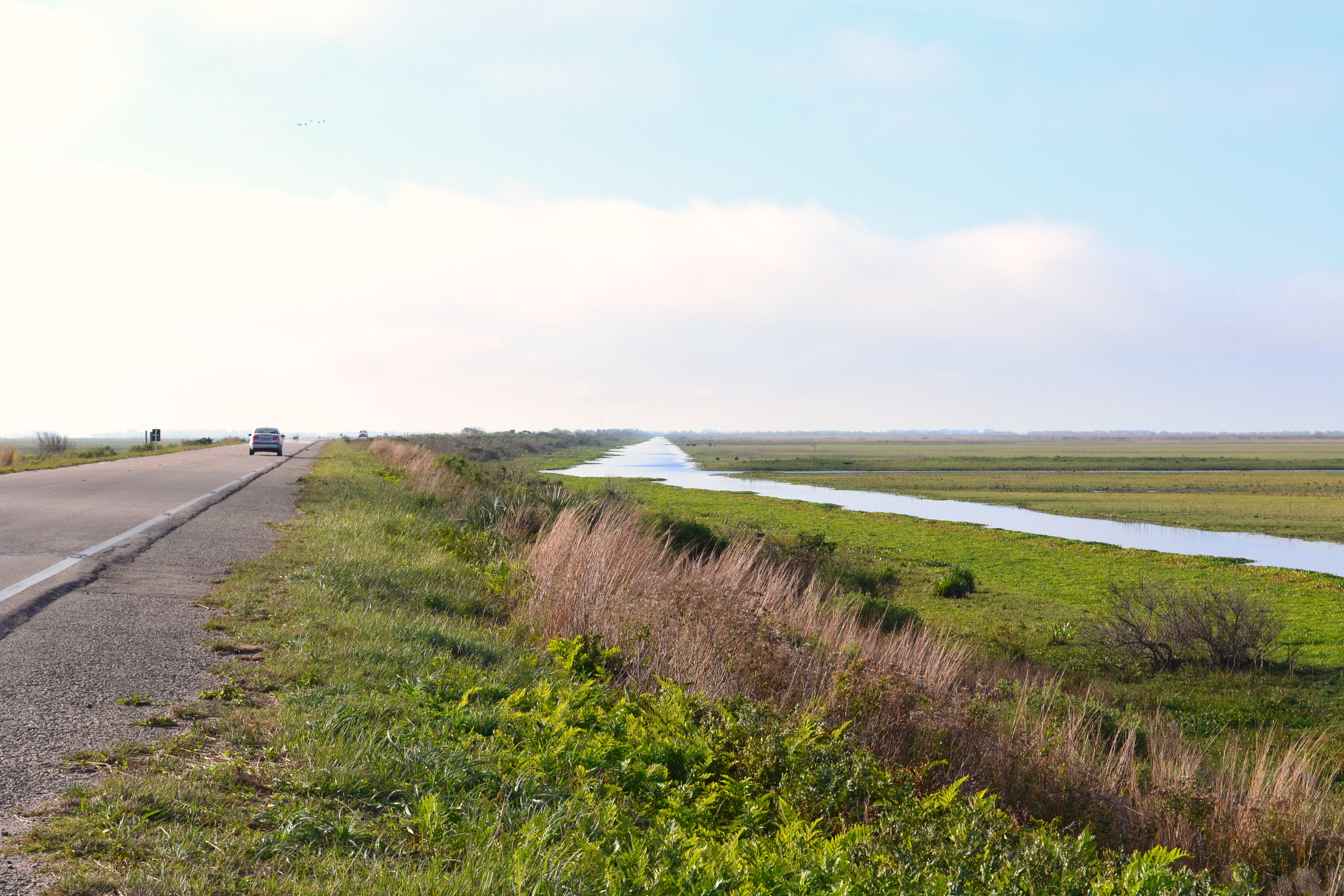
Taim Ecological Station to the north of the park

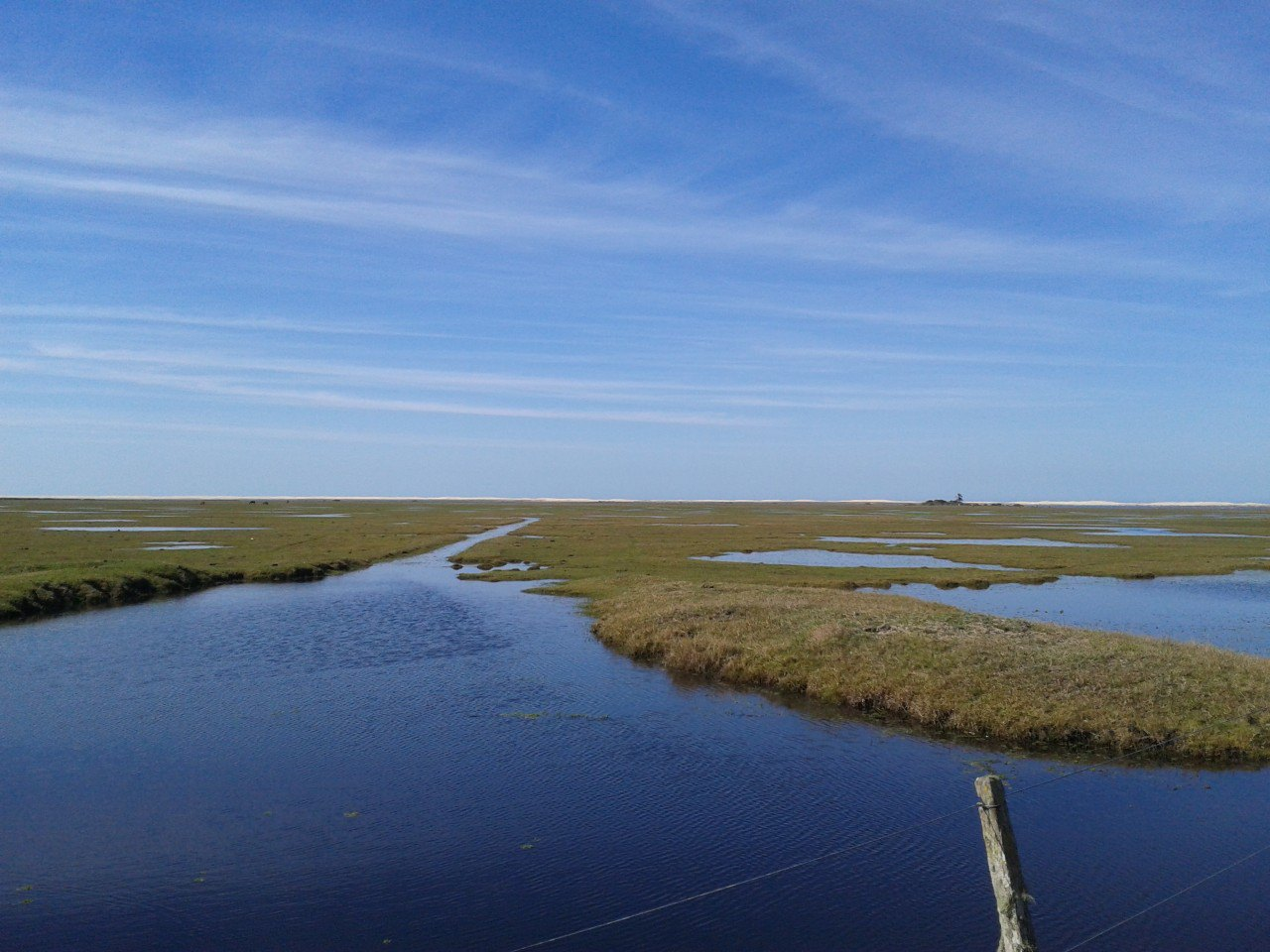
Flooded area

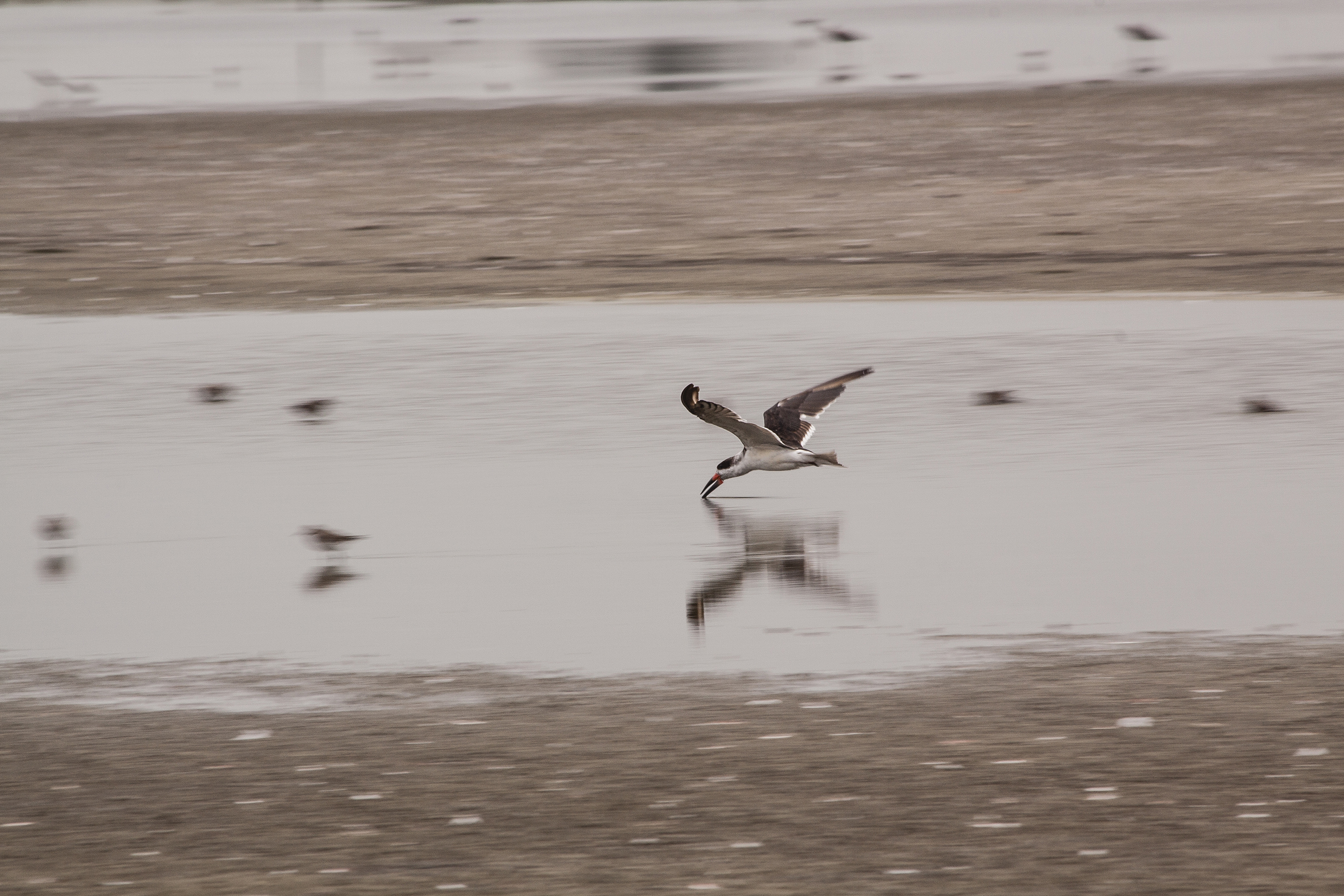
Black skimmer

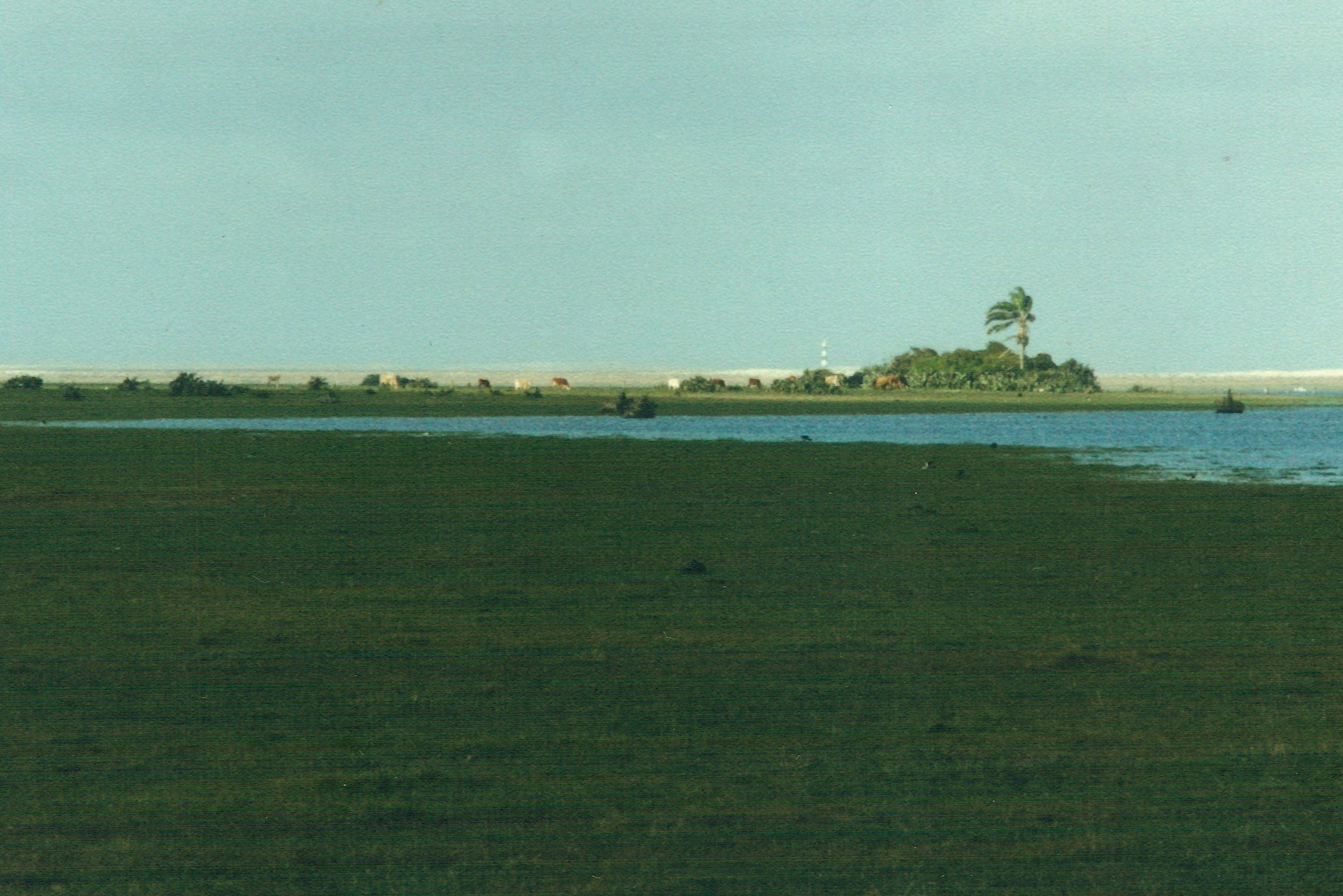
Lighthouse in the distance

== Sources ==
- Parna da Lagoa do Peixe (in Portuguese), Chico Mendes Institute for Biodiversity Conservation
- Unidade de Conservação: Parque Nacional da Lagoa do Peixe (in Portuguese), MMA: Ministério do Meio Ambiente
