= Chapada das Mesas National Park =

National park in Maranhão, Brazil

- Parque Nacional da Chapada das Mesas
- IUCN category II (national park)
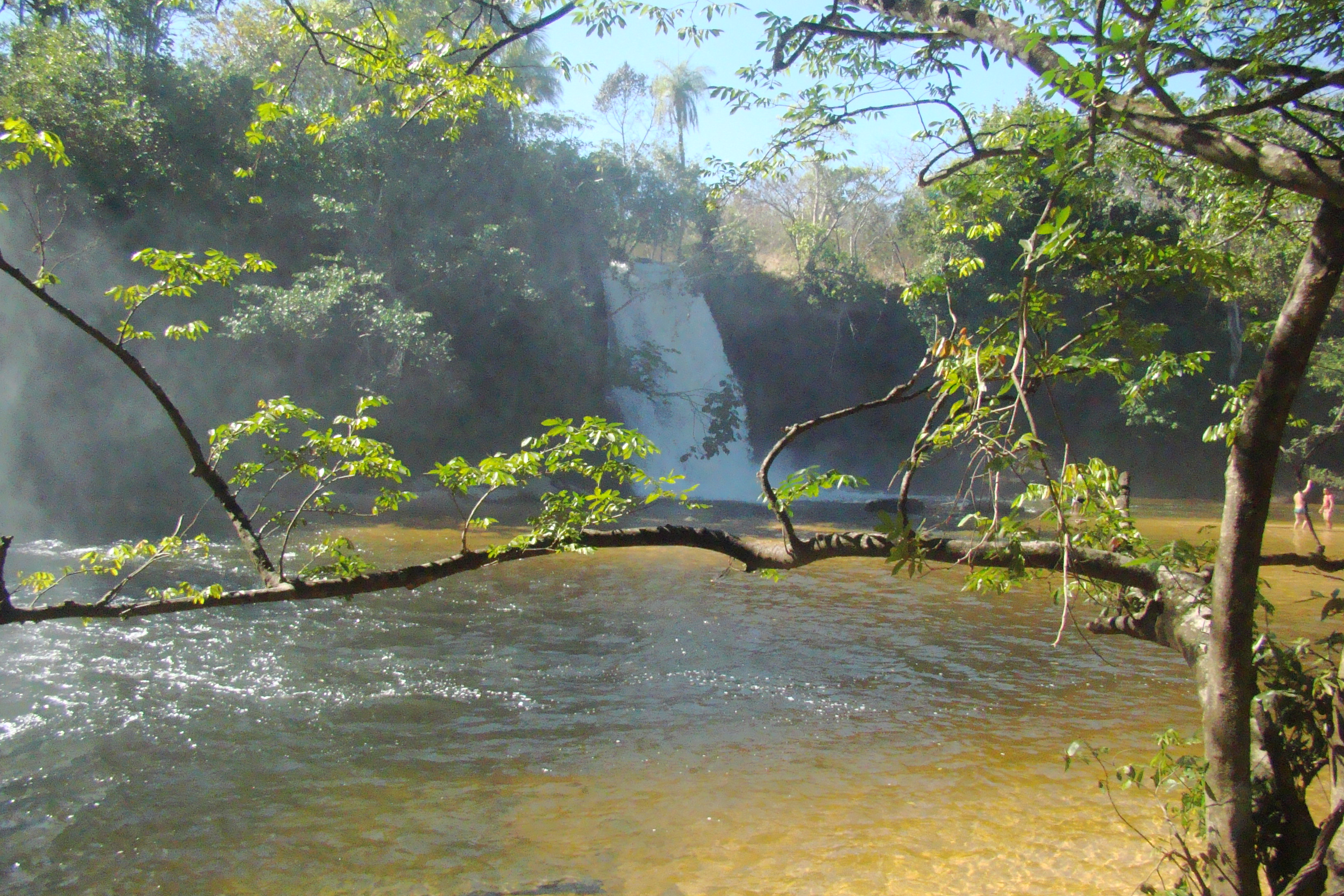
- Itapecuruzinho waterfall

- Location within Brazil
- Location: Maranhão, Brazil
- Nearest city: Carolina
- Coordinates: 7.138°S 47.139°W
- Area: 159,952 hectares (395,250 acres)
- Designation: National park
- Created: 2005
- Administrator: ICMBio

Chapada das Mesas National Park (Portuguese: Parque Nacional da Chapada das Mesas) is a national park in the state of Maranhão, Brazil. It was created to preserve the untouched cerrado vegetation of the region, and as a barrier against the advance of farming.

== Location ==
The park has an area of 159,952 hectares (395,250 acres) and is in the Cerrado biome. It was created on 12 December 2005, and is administered by the Chico Mendes Institute for Biodiversity Conservation. The park lies in the municipalities of Riachão, Estreito and Carolina in the state of Maranhão.

Average annual rainfall is 1,400 millimetres (55 in), Temperatures range from 15 to 39 °C (59 to 102 °F) with an average of 26 °C (79 °F). The highest point is 700 metres (2,300 ft) above sea level. The vegetation is characteristically that of the Cerrado, but includes open areas of grassland. The terrain includes hills and plateaus. The main rivers are the Farinha River in the north part and the Itapecuru River in the south, both fed by many springs and streams in the park.

The park is in the Chapada das Mesas region, which has significant tourist potential due its pleasant climate, sandstone cliffs with rock carvings, many waterfalls and other attractions. Most of the attractions are in areas where the environment has been modified or which have large human populations, so are outside the park. Within the park the two main tourist attractions for many years were the São Romão and Prata waterfalls. The park is not open to visitors.

== Conservation ==
As a national park the basic objectives are preservation of natural ecosystems of great ecological relevance and scenic beauty, enabling scientific research, educational activities, outdoor recreation and eco-tourism. The park was created primarily because it is an untouched Cerrado area that is threatened by the recent expansion of the agricultural frontier in Maranhão. It also contains more than 400 springs of important waterways. Protected species in the park include the oncilla (Leopardus tigrinus), ocelot (Leopardus pardalis), cougar (Puma concolor), giant anteater (Myrmecophaga tridactyla), bare-faced curassow (Crax fasciolata) and Chaco eagle (Buteogallus coronatus).

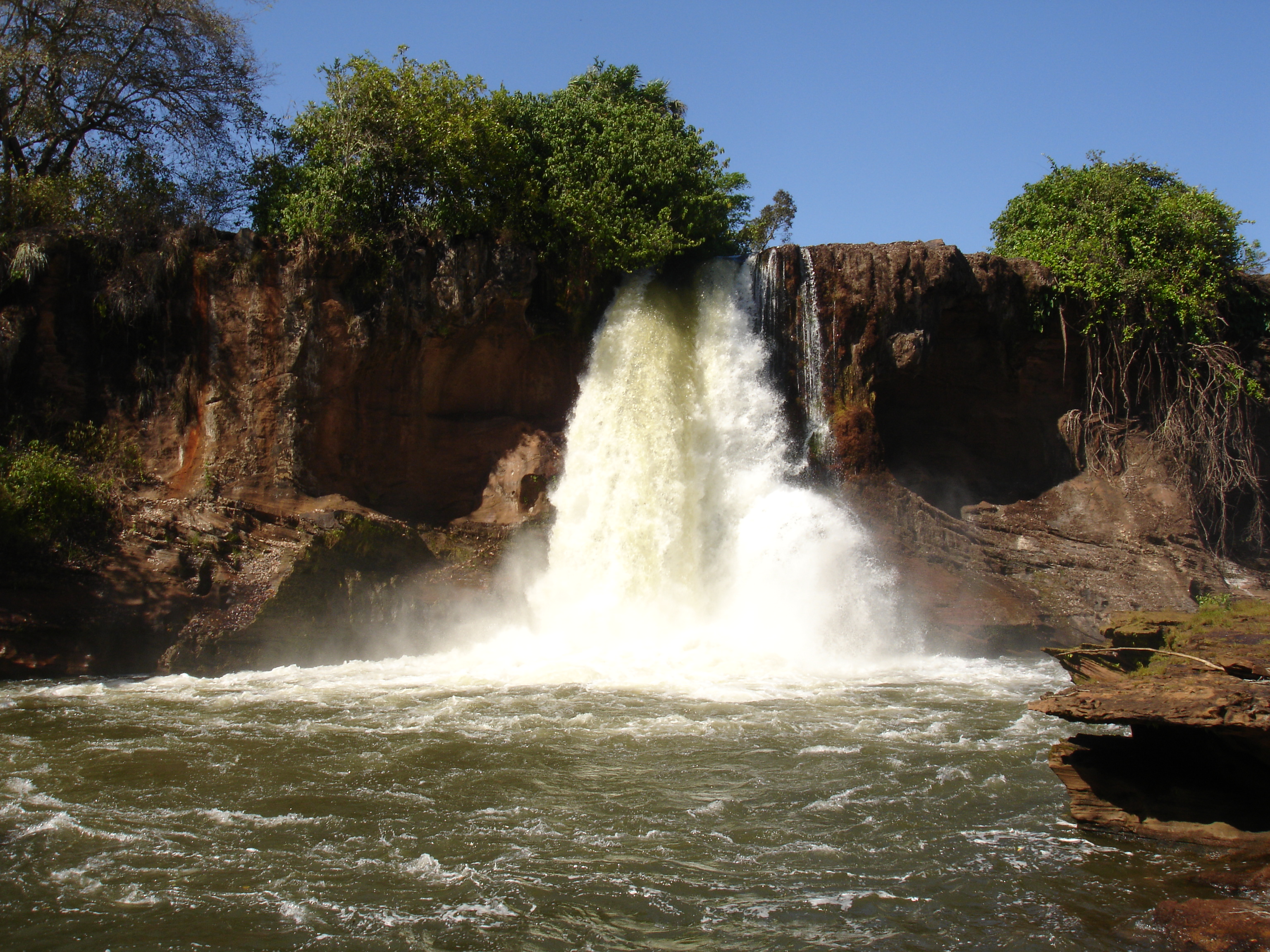
Prata waterfall

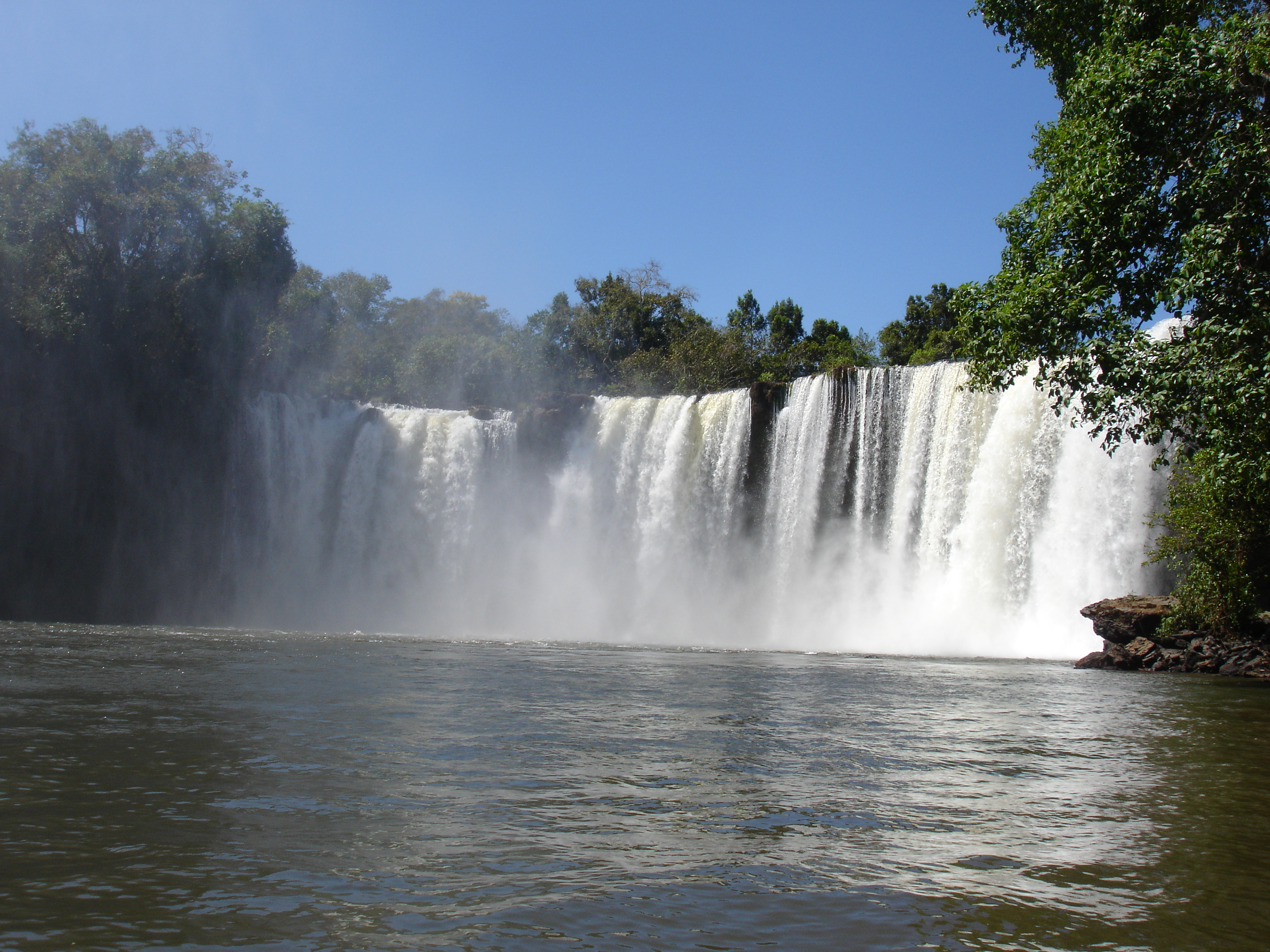
São Romão waterfall

== Sources ==
- Parque Nacional da Chapada das Mesas (in Portuguese), Chico Mendes Institute for Biodiversity Conservation, archived from the original on 2016-04-06
- Unidade de Conservação: Parque Nacional da Chapada das Mesas (in Portuguese), MMA: Ministério do Meio Ambiente
