= Guaratinga =

Municipality of Bahia, Brazil

Guaratinga-Ba
- Municipality
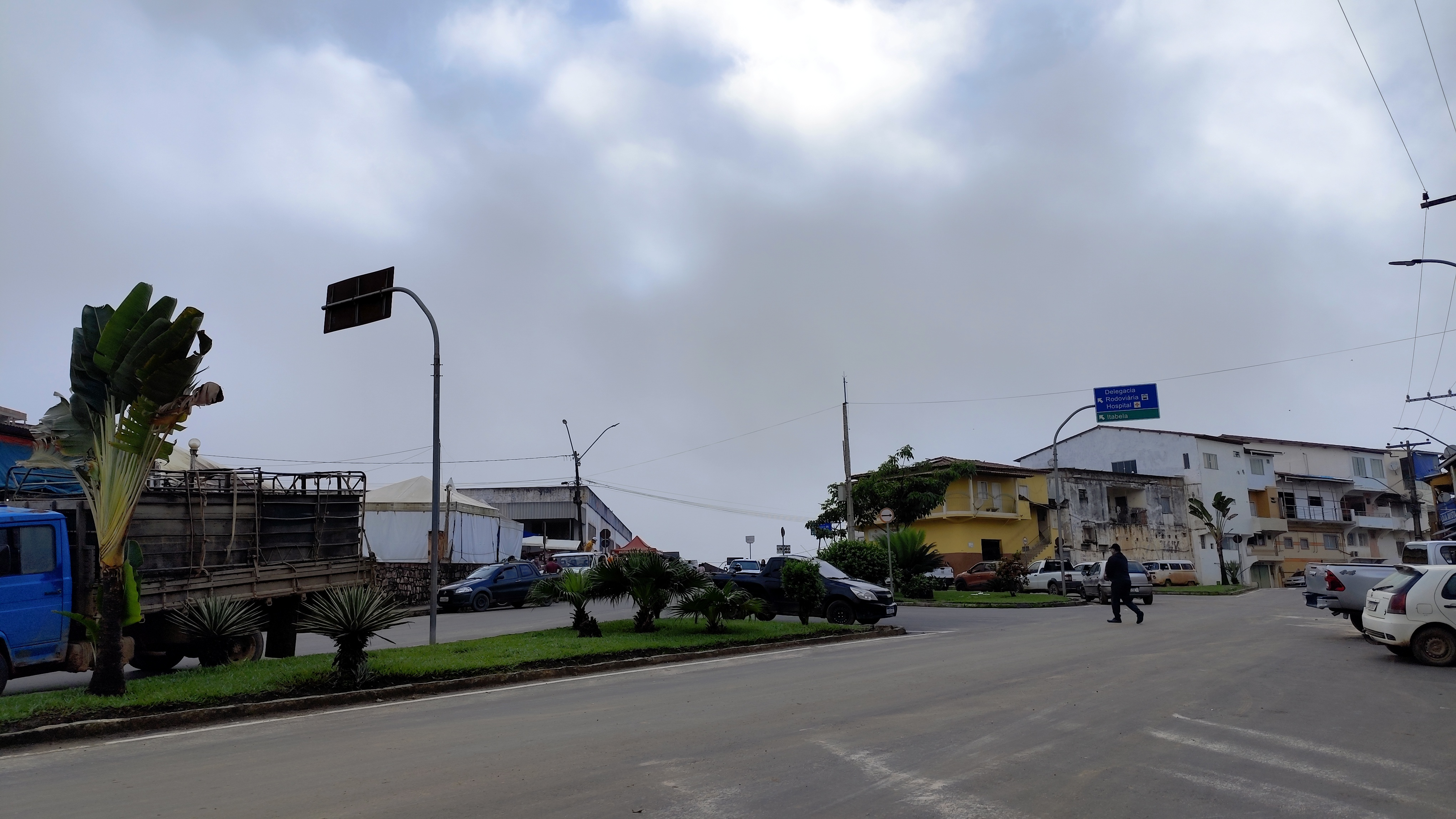
- Downtown Guaratinga

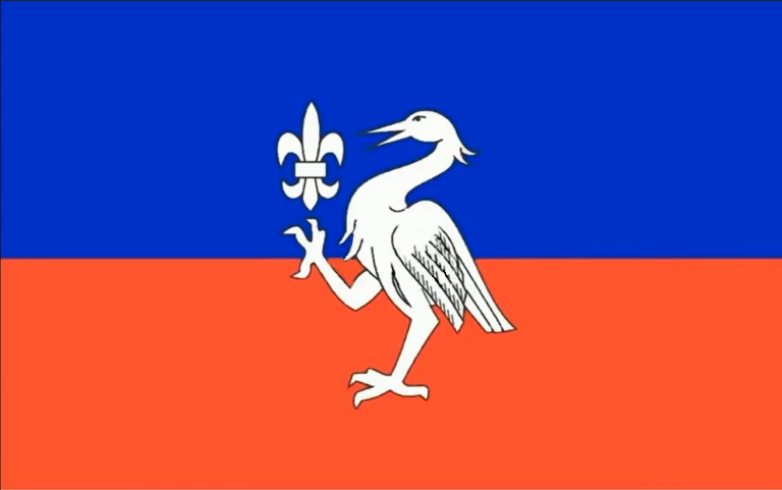
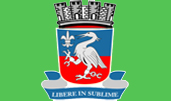
- Flag Coat of arms

- Location in Bahia
- Coordinates: 17°19′0″N 60°40′0″E
- Country: Brazil
- Region: Nordeste
- State: Bahia

Population (2020)
  - Total: 20,700
- Time zone: UTC−3 (BRT)
- Area code: 73

Guaratinga is a municipality in the state of Bahia in the North-East region of Brazil.

The municipality contains the 19,238-hectare (47,540-acre) Alto Cariri National Park, created in 2010.

== Climate ==
Guaratinga experiences a tropical savanna climate (Köppen: Aw) with hot summers, warm winters, and moderate rainfall.

Climate data for Guaratinga (1991–2020)
Month	Jan	Feb	Mar	Apr	May	Jun	Jul	Aug	Sep	Oct	Nov	Dec	Year
Mean daily maximum °C (°F)	31.8 (89.2)	32.3 (90.1)	31.6 (88.9)	30.0 (86.0)	28.3 (82.9)	27.0 (80.6)	26.2 (79.2)	26.7 (80.1)	28.1 (82.6)	29.5 (85.1)	29.9 (85.8)	31.2 (88.2)	29.4 (84.9)
Daily mean °C (°F)	25.9 (78.6)	26.2 (79.2)	25.8 (78.4)	24.9 (76.8)	23.4 (74.1)	22.1 (71.8)	21.3 (70.3)	21.4 (70.5)	22.6 (72.7)	23.7 (74.7)	24.6 (76.3)	25.4 (77.7)	23.9 (75.0)
Mean daily minimum °C (°F)	21.8 (71.2)	21.9 (71.4)	21.9 (71.4)	21.1 (70.0)	19.6 (67.3)	18.4 (65.1)	17.6 (63.7)	17.5 (63.5)	18.6 (65.5)	20.0 (68.0)	21.0 (69.8)	21.6 (70.9)	20.1 (68.2)
Average precipitation mm (inches)	101.2 (3.98)	83.7 (3.30)	131.6 (5.18)	102.8 (4.05)	68.0 (2.68)	60.3 (2.37)	66.8 (2.63)	51.9 (2.04)	50.0 (1.97)	88.8 (3.50)	170.2 (6.70)	148.9 (5.86)	1,124.2 (44.26)
Average precipitation days (≥ 1.0 mm)	10.2	9.4	12.2	11.2	8.8	9.2	11.5	8.7	8.5	9.5	12.0	11.1	122.3
Average relative humidity (%)	75.2	74.7	76.9	79.4	79.9	81.3	81.9	79.3	77.2	76.5	78.7	76.5	78.1
Average dew point °C (°F)	21.6 (70.9)	21.8 (71.2)	21.9 (71.4)	21.6 (70.9)	20.3 (68.5)	19.3 (66.7)	18.6 (65.5)	18.3 (64.9)	18.9 (66.0)	19.9 (67.8)	20.8 (69.4)	21.4 (70.5)	20.4 (68.7)
Mean monthly sunshine hours	218.9	212.2	213.8	196.6	187.1	172.5	176.0	177.4	177.8	174.2	157.2	196.0	2,259.7
Source: NOAA

== See also ==
- List of municipalities in Bahia
