= Serra do Itajaí National Park =

National park in Santa Catarina, Brazil

Serra do Itajaí Nacional Park
- Parque Nacional da Serra do Itajaí
- IUCN category II (national park)
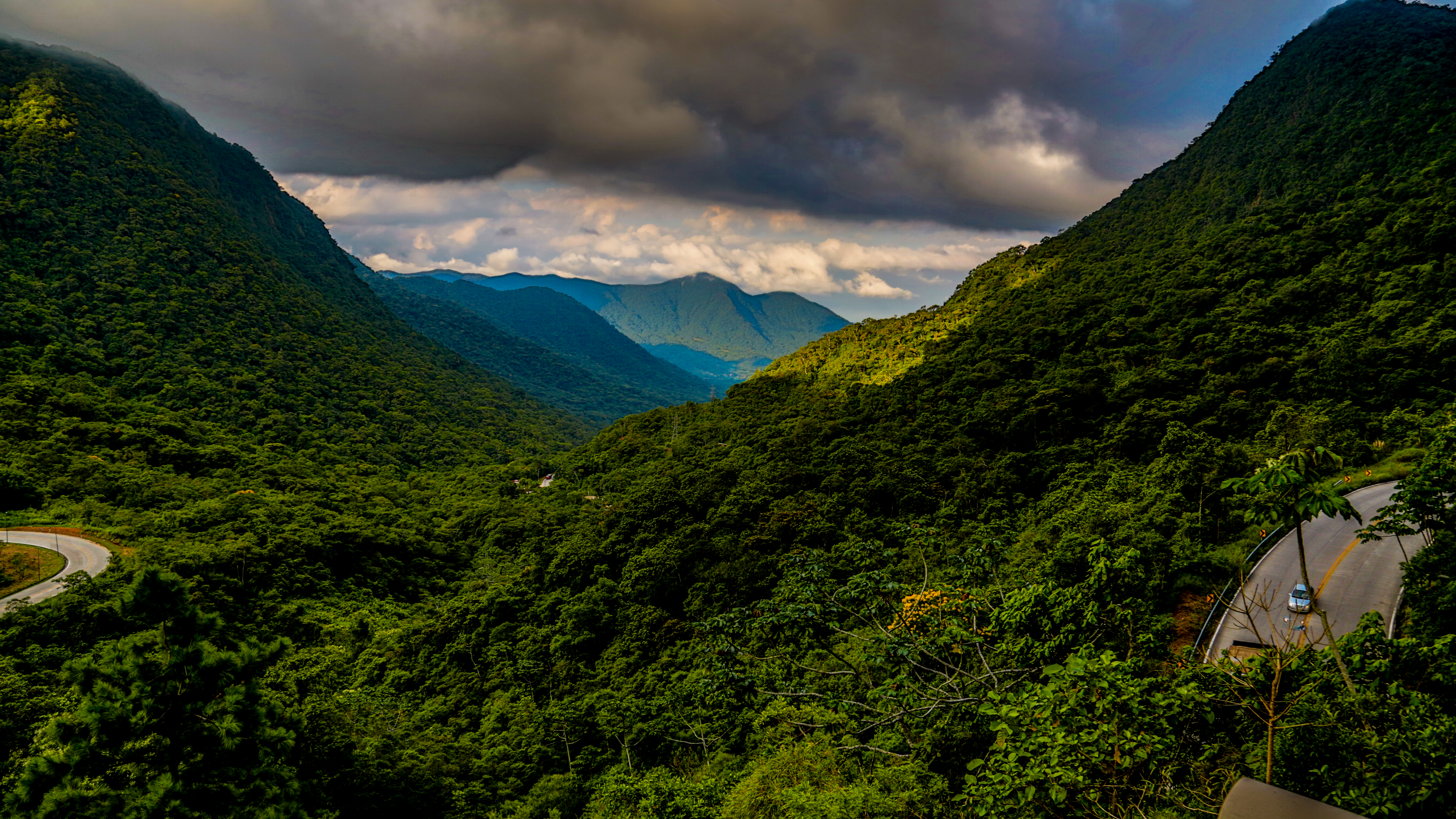
- Serra Dona Francisca

- Location within Brazil
- Nearest city: Brusque, Santa Catarina
- Coordinates: 27°07′30″S 49°11′42″W
- Designation: National park
- Administrator: ICMBio

Serra do Itajaí National Park or Itajaí Mountains National Park (Portuguese: Parque Nacional da Serra do Itajaí) is a national park in the state of Santa Catarina, Brazil.

== Location ==
The park is in the Atlantic Forest biome. It has an area of 57,375 hectares (141,780 acres). It was created by decree of 4 June 2004, modified by decree of 20 February 2006, and is administered by the Chico Mendes Institute for Biodiversity Conservation. It covers parts of the municipalities of Ascurra, Apiúna, Blumenau, Botuverá, Gaspar, Guabiruba, Indaial, Presidente Nereu and Vidal Ramos in the state of Santa Catarina.

== Conservation ==
The park is classified as IUCN protected area category II (national park). It has the objectives of preserving natural ecosystems of great ecological relevance and scenic beauty, enabling scientific research, environmental education, outdoors recreation and eco-tourism. Protected species in the park include cougar (Puma concolor), margay (Leopardus wiedii), vinaceous-breasted amazon (Amazona vinacea), white-necked hawk (Buteogallus lacernulatus), white-bearded antshrike (Biatas nigropectus) and Phylloscartes.

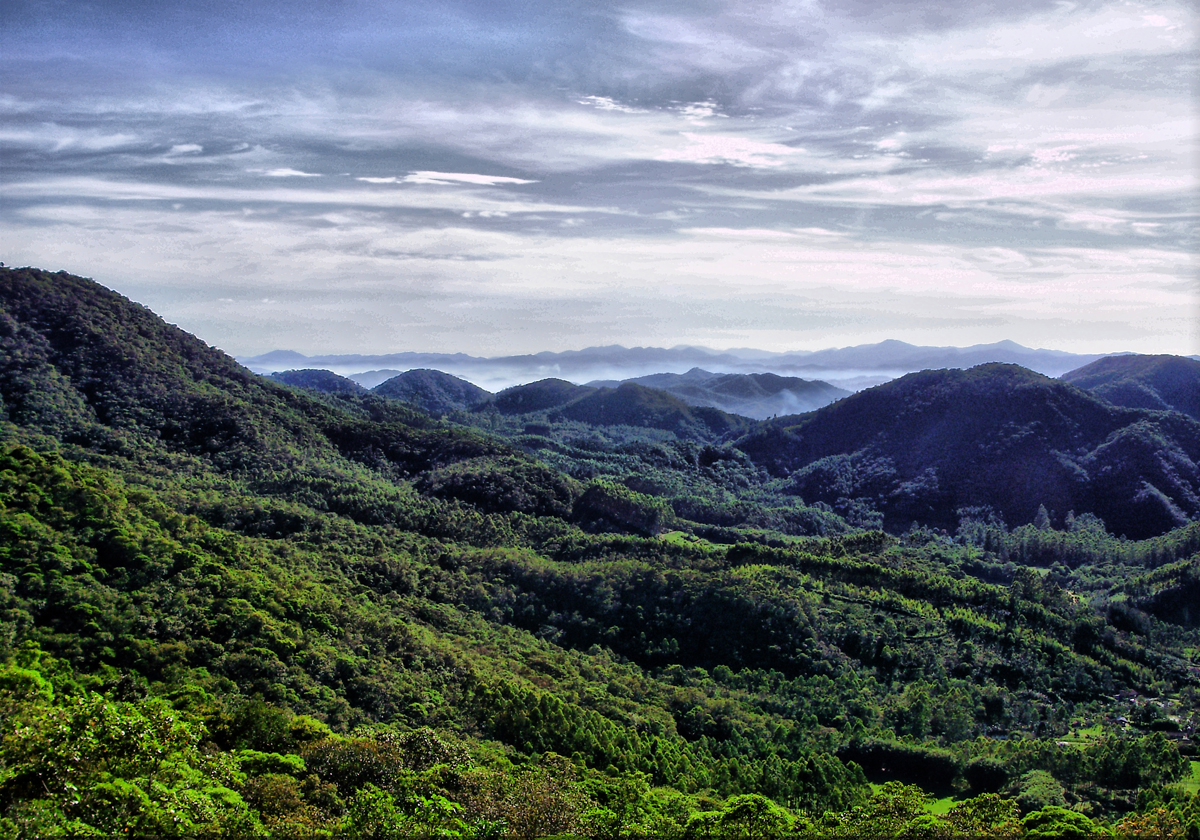
View from Morro Santo Antônio

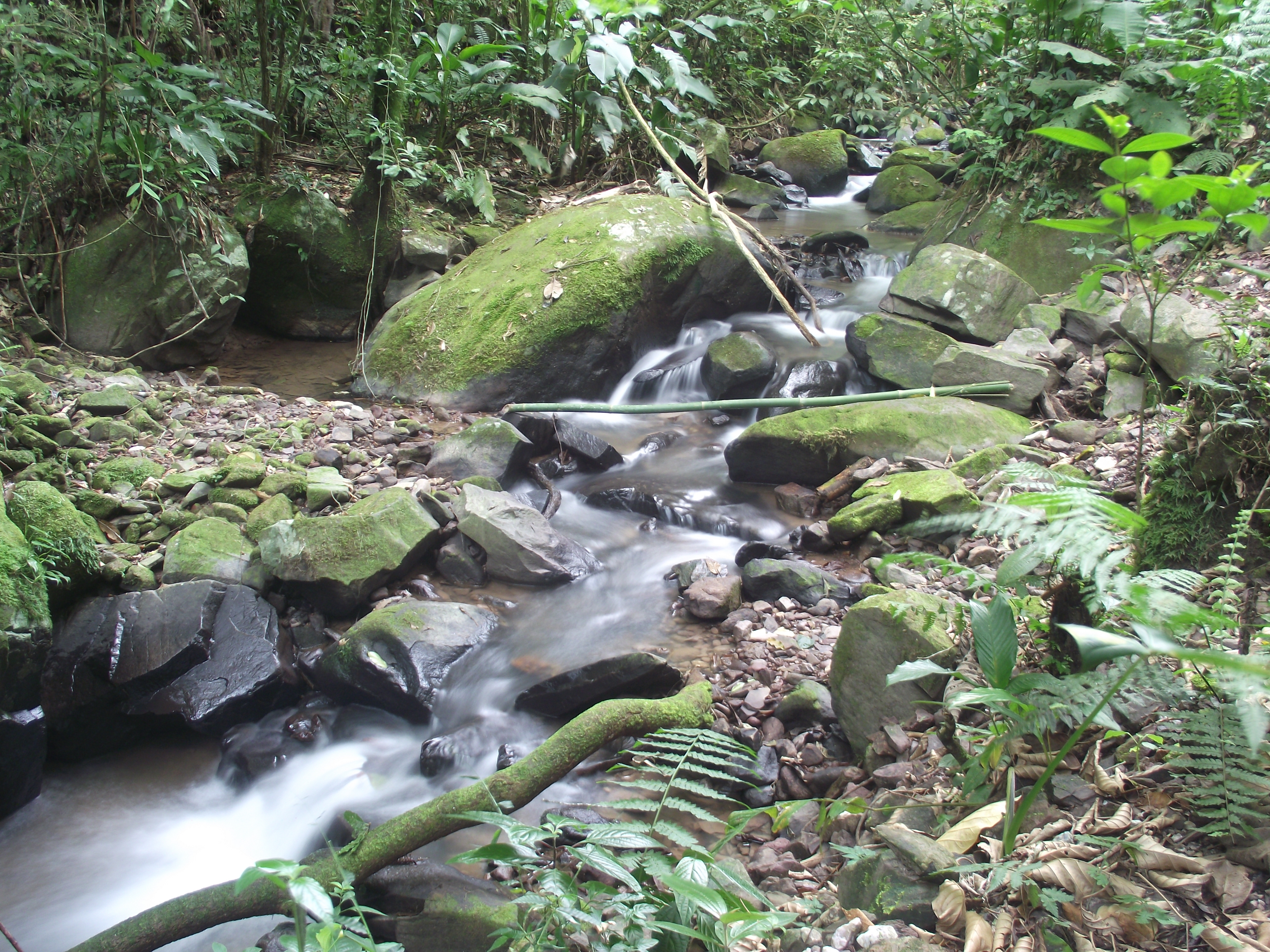
Stream on Morro do Spitzkopf

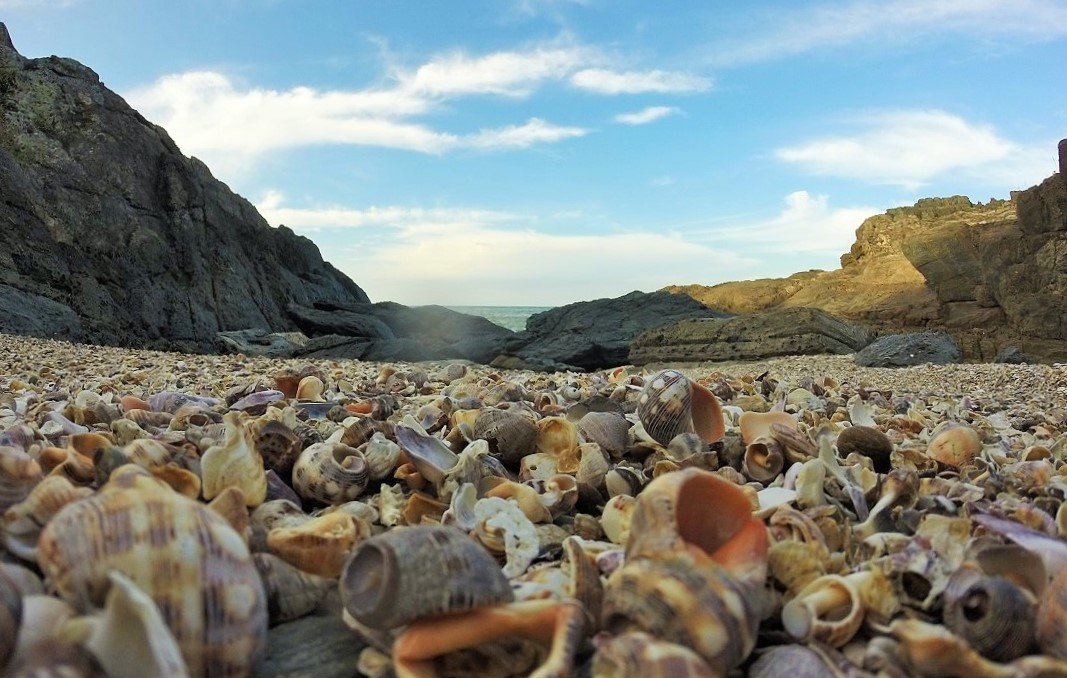
Beach at the mouth of the Itajaí-Açu

== Sources ==
- Parna da Serra do Itajaí (in Portuguese), Chico Mendes Institute for Biodiversity Conservation, archived from the original on 2016-03-03
- Unidade de Conservação: Parque Nacional da Serra do Itajaí (in Portuguese), MMA: Ministério do Meio Ambiente
