= Furna Feia National Park =

National park in Rio Grande do Norte, Brazil

- Parque Nacional da Furna Feia
- IUCN category II (national park)
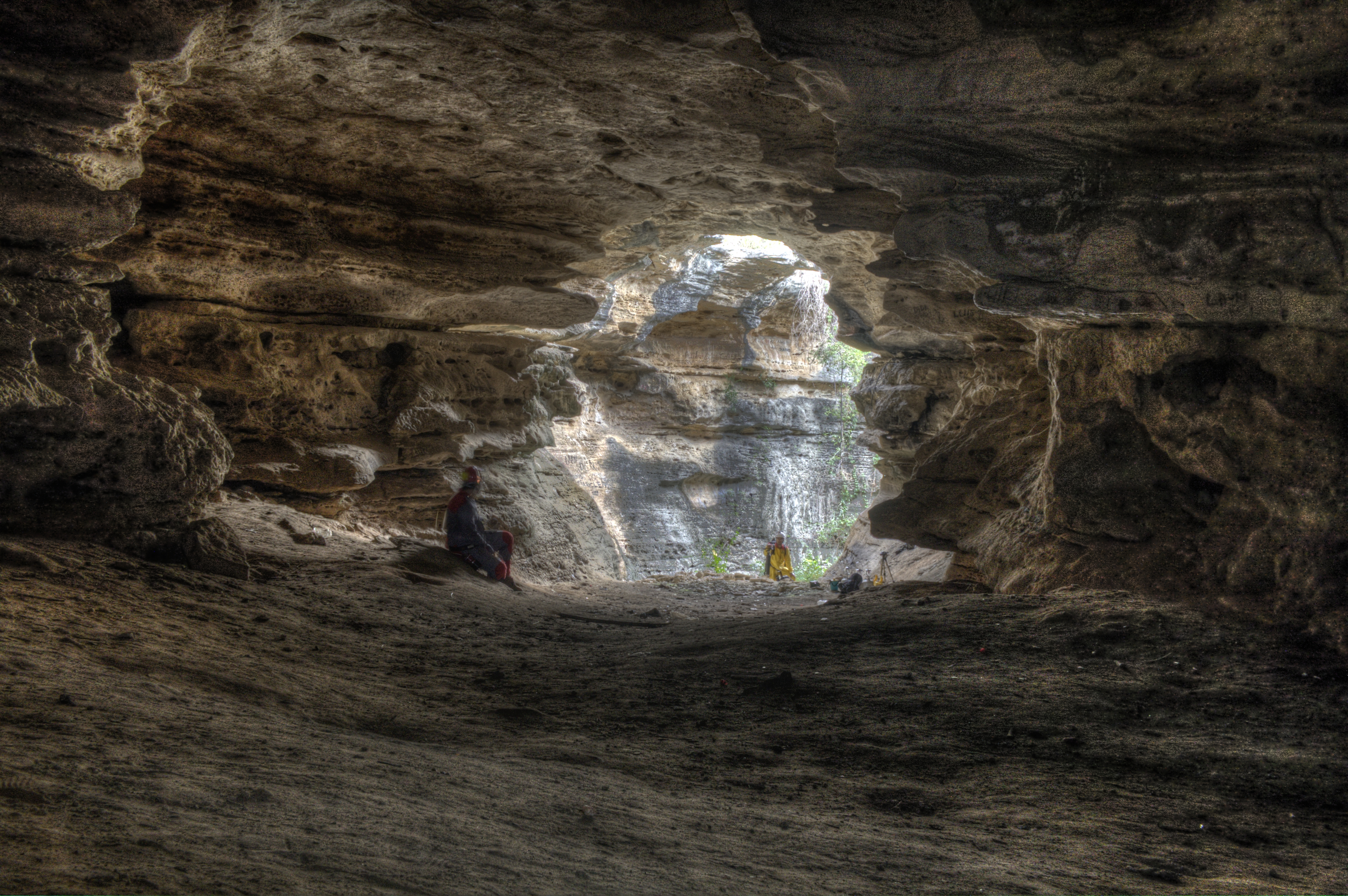
- Entrance of the main cave

- Location within Brazil
- Nearest city: Mossoró, Rio Grande do Norte
- Coordinates: 5°3′30″S 37°30′39″W
- Area: 8,518 hectares (21,050 acres)
- Designation: National park
- Established: 5 June 2012

The Furna Feia National Park (Portuguese: Parque Nacional da Furna Feia) is a national park in the state of Rio Grande do Norte, Brazil that contains a large cave system.

== History ==
Furna Feia park is the first national park in Rio Grande do Norte. Creation of the park was stalled by resistance from mining operations in the area, mainly limestone for use in making cement. As a compromise 700 hectares (1,700 acres) of the planned park where mining applications had been filed were given up, removing the main obstacle. The park was created on 5 June 2012, and is administered by the Chico Mendes Institute for Biodiversity Conservation (ICMBio). President Dilma Rousseff announced creation of the park on World Environment Day.

== Location ==
The park is in the Caatinga biome and has an area of 8,518 hectares (21,050 acres). The park lies in the municipalities of Baraúna and Mossoró in the state of Rio Grande do Norte. Furna Feia (Ugly Cavern) is the largest cave complex in the state of Rio Grande do Norte. So far more than 200 caves have been found. The main cave is 766 metres (2,513 ft) long, and is the most important attraction in the park. The park holds about 105 species of plants and 135 species of animals, some of which are endangered. Eleven species of troglobite invertebrates have been found, all new to science.

== Conservation ==
The parks is classed as IUCN protected area category II (national park). Its goals are to preserve the speleological complex of Furna Feia and the biodiversity associated with the Caatinga biome, to carry out scientific research and to develop educational activities, environmental interpretation, outdoors recreation and eco-tourism. ICMBio works with the local people to try to prevent actions that degrade the natural resources of the park, which include hunting, illegal removal of timber and destructive visits to the caves, particularly the main cave. The agency has established a fire brigade to help prevent forest fires in the conservation unit.

== Sources ==
- Alex Costa (26 September 2012), "Furna Feia: primeiro parque nacional do RN", Tribune do Norte
- Brazil Declares New Nature Reserves, Forest Fears Persist, Environment News Service, 5 June 2012, archived from the original on 2012-10-25
- Parque Nacional da Furna Feia (in Portuguese), Chico Mendes Institute for Biodiversity Conservation, archived from the original on 2016-03-03
- Unidade de Conservação: Parque Nacional da Furna Feia (in Portuguese), MMA: Ministério do Meio Ambiente
- Victor Souza (2 July 2013), PARQUE NACIONAL DA FURNA FEIA COMEMORA SEU PRIMEIRO ANIVERSÁRIO, João Pessoa: ICMBio
