= Tavares, Rio Grande do Sul =

Municipality of Rio Grande do Sul, Brazil

Tavares
- Municipality
- Flag Coat of arms

- Location within Rio Grande do Sul

- Location in Brazil
- Coordinates: 31°17′15″S 51°05′40″W
- Country: Brazil
- State: Rio Grande do Sul

Population (2020)
  - Total: 5,483
- Time zone: UTC−3 (BRT)

Tavares is a municipality in the state of Rio Grande do Sul, Brazil. It has received some newsworthy highlights as several parts of the municipality were abandoned in the late 1990s due to dune and sea reclaiming the area. Some families left the area as early as 1986 due to harsh conditions to keep access and the area from eroding.

The area has been eventually turned into a reserve, called "Parque Nacional da Lagoa do Peixe" (National Park of the Fish Lagoon). Villages like Barra da Lagoa (which once held over 200 families) and Balneário Paiva (around 25 families) are all but faded remains, the later having almost nothing left. In Balneário de Lagamarzinho, where once a community of at least 250 families lived, due streets were swallowed by the sea, The only settlement as of 2015 was Balneário de Talha-Mar, where once 180 families lived, only a few remain. These abandoned villages are now called "The phantom villages" of Tavares.

Some other neighborhoods eventually also relocated due to the loss of the other villages claimed by the sea, such as Villa da Barra da Lagoa, 2 km away from the sea, which has abandoned buildings now being buried by the dunes.

== See also ==
- List of municipalities in Rio Grande do Sul
