= Southern Amazon Mosaic =

- Mosaico da Amazônia Meridional
- Location within Brazil
- Coordinates: 8°17′10″S 58°46′49″W
- Designation: Protected area mosaic
- Created: 25 August 2011
- Administrator: Various

The Southern Amazon Mosaic (Portuguese: Mosaico da Amazônia Meridional) is a protected area mosaic in Brazil.

== Creation ==
The Southern Amazon Mosaic of conservation units in the region between the states of Amazonas, Mato Grosso and Rondônia was recognized by the federal environment ministry by ordnance 332 of 25 August 2011. The mosaic was to have an advisory board as a forum for integrated management with representatives of the conservation units, the federal and state environmental agencies and civil society organisations.

== Federal units ==
Under the administration of the Chico Mendes Institute for Biodiversity Conservation (ICMBio) it included:

- Juruena National Park
- Campos Amazônicos National Park
- Jaru Biological Reserve
- Jatuarana National Forest

== Amazonas units ==
Under the administration of the Centro Estadual de Unidades de Conservação - CEUC (Amazonas): (Note: The units in Amazonas had already been organised into the Apuí Mosaic.)

- Sucunduri State Park
- Guariba State Park
- Bararati Sustainable Development Reserve
- Aripuanã Sustainable Development Reserve
- Guariba Extractive Reserve
- Manicoré State Forest
- Aripuanã State Forest
- Sucunduri State Forest
- Apuí State Forest

== Mato Grosso units ==
Under the administration of the Coordenação de Unidades de Conservação - CUCO (Mata Grosso):

- Igarapés do Juruena State Park
- Tucumã State Park
- Apiacás Ecological Reserve
- Rio Madeirinha Ecological Station
- Rio Roosevelt Ecological Station
- Guariba-Roosevelt Extractive Reserve

== Rondônia units ==
Under the administration of the Secretaria de Estado do Desenvolvimento Ambiental de Rondônia - SEDAM (Rondônia):

- Roxinho Extractive Reserve
- Seringueira Extractive Reserve
- Garrote Extractive Reserve
- Mogno Extractive Reserve
- Piquiá Extractive Reserve
- Angelim Extractive Reserve
- Itaúba Extractive Reserve
- Ipê Extractive Reserve
- Jatobá Extractive Reserve
- Massaranduba Extractive Reserve
- Maracatiara Extractive Reserve
- Sucupira Extractive Reserve
- Castanheira Extractive Reserve
- Aquariquara Extractive Reserve
- Freijó Extractive Reserve
- Rio Preto/Jacundá Extractive Reserve
- Cedro State Forest
- Mutum State Forest
- Gavião State Forest
- Araras State Forest
- Tucano State Forest

== Sources ==
- MOS da Amazônia Meridional (in Portuguese), ISA: Instituto Socioambiental
- "Portaria No 332, de 25 de Agosto de 2011" (PDF), Diário Oficial de União (in Portuguese), MMA: Ministério do Meio Ambiente, 26 August 2011
- Saiba mais sobre o Mosaico de Apuí (in Portuguese), WWF Brasil, 25 June 2006
