= Apuí State Forest =

State forest in Amazonas, Brazil

- Floresta Estadual do Apuí
- IUCN category VI (protected area with sustainable use of natural resources)
- Location within Brazil
- Nearest city: Apuí, Amazonas
- Coordinates: 7.853915°S 58.751907°W
- Area: 185,946 hectares (459,480 acres)
- Designation: State forest
- Created: 24 January 2005
- Administrator: Secretaria de Estado do Meio Ambiente do Amazonas

The Apuí State Forest (Portuguese: Floresta Estadual do Apuí) is a state forest in the state of Amazonas, Brazil.

== Location ==
The Apuí State Forest is in the municipality of Apuí, Amazonas. It has an area of 185,946 hectares (459,480 acres). It is bounded by the Bararati Sustainable Development Reserve to the east, the Sucunduri State Park to the south and west, and the Juruena National Park to the north. The forest is in the Amazon biome. The mosaic includes flooded and terra firma forests, rocky fields, campina and campinarana. It has great scenic beauty, with waterfalls and rapids. There is great biodiversity, including 13 endemic species of primate. The western part of the mosaic has 850 tree species, 46 mammals, more than 300 birds, 27 reptiles, 30 amphibians and nearly 100 species of fish.

== History ==
The Apuí State Forest Was created by Amazonas state decree 24.812 of 24 January 2005 with the objectives of promoting sustainable use of multiple forest resources, and scientific research with emphasis on sustainable exploitation of native forests. The forest is an integral part of the Apuí Mosaic, which totals 2,467,243 hectares (6,096,690 acres) in area and contains the Guariba and Sucunduri State Parks; Bararati and Aripuanã sustainable development reserves; Guariba Extractive Reserve; and Sucunduri, Aripuanã, Apuí and Manicoré state forests. The management plan for the Apuí Mosaic was approved on 22 September 2010. This was treated as the management plan for each of the conservation units as well as for the mosaic itself.

== Sources ==
- FES do Apuí (in Portuguese), ISA: Instituto Socioambiental
- "Floresta Estadual do Apuí", Via Rural (in Portuguese), archived from the original on 2016-10-14
- RDS Bararati (in Portuguese), ISA: Instituto Socioambiental
- Saiba mais sobre o Mosaico de Apuí (in Portuguese), WWF Brasil, 25 June 2006
