= Aripuanã State Forest =

State forest in Amazonas, Brazil

- Floresta Estadual do Aripuanã
- IUCN category VI (protected area with sustainable use of natural resources)
- Location within Brazil
- Nearest city: Apuí, Amazonas
- Coordinates: 8.629278°S 59.931417°W
- Area: 336,040 hectares (830,400 acres)
- Designation: State forest
- Created: 19 January 2005

The Aripuanã State Forest (Portuguese: Floresta Estadual do Aripuanã) is a State forest in the state of Amazonas, Brazil.

== Location ==
The Aripuanã State Forest is in the municipality of Apuí, Amazonas. It has an area of 336,040 hectares (830,400 acres). The forest is bounded by the border with the state of Mato Grosso to the south, the Aripuanã Sustainable Development Reserve to the east and the Guariba Extractive Reserve to the west. The Paxiúba River, a tributary of the Aripuanã River enters the forest from the south and flows across it in a northerly direction. The Paxiubinha River rises in the forest and joins the Paxiúba River on the northern boundary of the forest.

== History ==
The Aripuanã State Forest was created by Amazonas state governor decree 24807 of 19 January 2005. The objectives are to support multiple sustainable uses of forest resources and scientific research with emphasis of methods of sustainable exploitation of native forests.

== Conservation ==
The Aripuanã State Forest is an integral part of the Apuí Mosaic, which totals 2,467,243 hectares (6,096,690 acres) in area and contains the Guariba and Sucunduri State Parks; Bararati and Aripuanã sustainable development reserves; Guariba Extractive Reserve; and Sucunduri, Aripuana, Apuí and Manicoré state forests.

== Sources ==
- FES do Aripuanã (in Portuguese), ISA: Instituto Socioambiental
- Saiba mais sobre o Mosaico de Apuí (in Portuguese), WWF Brasil, 25 June 2006
