= Guariba River (Aripuanã River tributary) =

River in Brazil

- Location within Brazil
- Native name: Rio Guariba (Portuguese)

Location
- Country: Brazil

Physical characteristics
- Mouth
  - location: Aripuanã River, Novo Aripuanã
  - coordinates: 7.714105°S 60.587421°W

Basin features
- River system: Aripuanã River

Guariba River (Portuguese: Rio Guariba) is a river of the Mato Grosso and Amazonas states in north-western Brazil. It is a tributary of the Aripuanã River.

== Course ==
In Mato Grosso the river forms the eastern boundary of the northern half of the 164,224 hectares (405,810 acres) Guariba-Roosevelt Extractive Reserve, a sustainable use unit created in 1996. It then crosses the border into Amazonas, where it runs through the 150,465 hectares (371,810 acres) Guariba Extractive Reserve, created in 2005. Further north it meets the Aripuanã in the region between the Campos Amazônicos and Juruena national parks.

== See also ==
- List of rivers of Amazonas

== Sources ==
- RESEX Guariba-Roosevelt (in Portuguese), ISA: Instituto Socioambiental
- RESEX do Guariba (in Portuguese), ISA: Instituto Socioambiental
