= Apuí Mosaic =

- Mosaico do Apuí
- Location within Brazil
- Nearest city: Apuí, Amazonas
- Coordinates: 8.31278°S 58.762391°W
- Area: 2,467,244 hectares (6,096,690 acres)
- Designation: Protected area mosaic
- Created: 12 March 2010
- Administrator: Secretaria de Estado do Meio Ambiente do Amazonas

The Apuí Mosaic (Portuguese: Mosaico do Apuí) is a protected area mosaic in the state of Amazonas, Brazil.

== Location ==
The Apuí Mosaic is divided between the municipalities of Apuí (91.85%) and Novo Aripuanã (8.15%) in the state of Amazonas. It covers an area of 2,467,244 hectares (6,096,690 acres). The mosaic is accessible by air to Apuí, by land via the BR-230 Trans-Amazonian Highway or by boat via the Madeira River to the city of Novo Aripuanã and then to the conservation units via the Aripuanã River.

The mosaic contains the Guariba and Sucunduri State Parks; Bararati and Aripuanã sustainable development reserves; Guariba Extractive Reserve; and Sucunduri, Aripuanã, Apuí and Manicoré state forests. The mosaic, together with the Juruena and Campos Amazônicos national parks, forms a contiguous block of 9,000,000 hectares (22,000,000 acres) of protected areas known as the Southern Amazon Ecological Corridor, which covers parts of southern Amazonas, northern Mato Grosso and southwestern Pará. These are areas with strong deforestation pressure due to expansion of the agricultural frontier into the Brazilian Amazon.

== History ==
The Apuí Mosaic was created by decree 55 of 12 March 2010 under the responsibility of CEUC in the border region between the states of Amazonas, Mato Grosso and Pará. The advisory board was created by the same decree. The management plan was approved on 22 September 2010. The plan was treated as the plan for each of the nine conservation units as well as for the mosaic as a whole, on the basis that the units represented a pre-zoning of the mosaic into areas with different objectives and types of use. The integrated plan would help correct errors in delimitation of the units as better information was obtained, and would prevent actions in one unit having negative effect on another unit.

== Environment ==
The mosaic includes terra firma forest, flooded forest, campos rupestres, campina and campinarana. It contains the headwaters of the Acari and Sucunduri rivers. The Monte Cristo rapids and the Falls (Saltos do Rio Sucunduri) are well-known attractions. The region has more than 13 endemic species of primates. Surveys of the west of the mosaic have identified 850 tree species, 46 mammals, more than 300 birds, 27 reptiles, 30 amphibians and almost 100 species of fish.

== Sources ==
- RDS Bararati (in Portuguese), ISA: Instituto Socioambiental
- MOS do Apuí (in Portuguese), ISA: Instituto Socioambiental
- Saiba mais sobre o Mosaico de Apuí (in Portuguese), WWF Brasil, 25 June 2006
