= Guariba Extractive Reserve =

- Reserva Extrativista do Guariba
- IUCN category VI (protected area with sustainable use of natural resources)
- Location within Brazil
- Nearest city: Apuí, Amazonas
- Coordinates: 8.605352°S 60.405324°W
- Area: 150,465 hectares (371,810 acres)
- Designation: Extractive reserve
- Created: 2 June 2005
- Administrator: Centro Estadual de Unidades de Conservação – Amazonas

The Guariba Extractive Reserve (Portuguese: Reserva Extrativista do Guariba) is an extractive reserve in the state of Amazonas, Brazil.

== Location ==
The Guariba Extractive Reserve is divided between the municipalities of Novo Aripuanã (28.31%) and Apuí (71.69%) in the state of Amazonas. It covers 150,465 hectares (371,810 acres). The reserve's southern boundary is the border with the state of Mato Grosso. It adjoins the Guariba-Roosevelt Extractive Reserve in Mato Grosso. To the west to adjoins the Guariba State Park and the Manicoré State Forest. To the north it adjoins the Campos Amazônicos National Park. To the east it adjoins the Aripuanã State Forest. The Guariba River, a tributary of the Aripuanã River, runs through the reserve from south to north.

The accumulated deforestation by 2010 totalled 98 hectares (240 acres), or 0.07% of the total area. No deforestation was detected in the five years from creation of the reserve in 2005.

== History ==
The Guariba Extractive Reserve was created by Amazonas state governor decree 25.040 of 2 June 2005. The conservation unit is supported by the Amazon Region Protected Areas Program.

The Apuí Mosaic was created by decree 55 of 12 March 2010 under the responsibility of CEUC in the border region between the states of Amazonas, Mato Grosso and Pará. The mosaic contains the Guariba and Sucunduri State Parks; Bararati and Aripuanã sustainable development reserves; Guariba Extractive Reserve; and Sucunduri, Aripuanã, Apuí and Manicoré state forests. The Southern Amazon Mosaic of conservation units in the region between the states of Amazonas, Mato Grosso and Rondônia was recognised by the federal environment ministry by ordnance 332 of 25 August 2011. It includes the Guariba Extractive Reserve and other units of the Apuí Mosaic

== Sources ==
- Full list: PAs supported by ARPA, ARPA
- MOS do Apuí (in Portuguese), ISA: Instituto Socioambiental
- Paulo Amaral; Andréia Pinto; Izabella da Paixão Gomes; Carlos Alexandre da Cunha; Rodney Salomão; Gabriela Galetti (2012), Áreas Protegidas no Sul do Estado do Amazonas (PDF) (in Portuguese), Belém, PA: Imazon, ISBN 978-85-86212-42-0
- "Portaria No 332, de 25 de Agosto de 2011" (PDF), Diário Oficial de União (in Portuguese), MMA: Ministério do Meio Ambiente, 26 August 2011
- RESEX do Guariba (in Portuguese), ISA: Instituto Socioambiental
- Saiba mais sobre o Mosaico de Apuí (in Portuguese), WWF Brasil, 25 June 2006
