= Mariepauá River =

- Location within Brazil
- Native name: Rio Mariepauá (Portuguese)

Location
- Country: Brazil

Physical characteristics
- Mouth
  - location: Madeira River, Novo Aripuanã, Amazonas
  - coordinates: 5.264955°S 60.555699°W

Basin features
- River system: Madeira River

The Mariepauá River (Portuguese: Rio Mariepauá) is a tributary of the Madeira River in the state of Amazonas, Brazil.

== Course ==
The river defines the western boundary of the 589,611 hectares (1,456,960 acres) Juma Sustainable Development Reserve, created in 2006 to support sustainable extraction of forest resources by the traditional population. Two new species of fish have been found in the river. In March 2015 Google launched imagery of the river in its "Street View" feature of Google Maps.

== See also ==
- List of rivers of Amazonas (Brazilian state)

== Sources ==
- Paresh Dave (2 March 2015), "Google releases 'Street View' of Amazon rainforest", Los Angeles Times
- RDS do Juma (in Portuguese), ISA: Instituto Socioambiental
- Viana, Virgilio (March 2010), Plano de Gestão da RDS do Juma (PDF) (in Portuguese)
