= Arauá River (Aripuanã River tributary) =

River in Brazil

- Location within Brazil
- Native name: Rio Arauá (Portuguese)

Location
- Country: Brazil

Physical characteristics
- Source
  - location: Amazonas state
- Mouth
  - location: Aripuanã River, Novo Aripuanã, Amazonas
  - coordinates: 5.344220°S 60.432226°W

Basin features
- River system: Aripuanã River

The Arauá River (Portuguese: Rio Arauá) is a river of Amazonas state in north-western Brazil. It is a tributary of the Aripuanã River.

== Course ==
The Arauá River runs through the 589,611 hectares (1,456,960 acres) Juma Sustainable Development Reserve, created in 2006. It merges into the Aripuanã shortly before the latter merges into the Madeira River.

== See also ==
- List of rivers of Amazonas

== Sources ==
- Viana, Virgilio (March 2010), Plano de Gestão da RDS do Juma (PDF) (in Portuguese)
