= Aripuanã National Forest =

National forest in Amazonas, Brazil

- Floresta Nacional do Aripuanã
- IUCN category VI (protected area with sustainable use of natural resources)
- Location within Brazil
- Nearest city: Novo Aripuanã, Amazonas
- Coordinates: 7.098°S 60.599°W
- Area: 751,302.17 hectares (1,856,508.1 acres)
- Designation: National forest
- Created: 11 May 2016
- Administrator: Chico Mendes Institute for Biodiversity Conservation

The Aripuanã National Forest (Portuguese: Floresta Nacional do Aripuanã) is a national forest in the state of Amazonas, Brazil. It supports sustainable forestry, and also protects the environment, supports scientific research and protects the sustainable lifestyle of the traditional inhabitants of the forest.

== Location ==
The Aripuanã National Forest covers parts of the municipalities of Novo Aripuanã (73.71%), Manicoré (9.27%) and Apuí (17.03%) in the state of Amazonas. It has an area of 751,302.17 hectares (1,856,508.1 acres). The forest lies to the north of the Trans-Amazonian Highway (BR-230). The Aripuanã River, a tributary of the Madeira River, flows north through the forest. The Manicoré Biological Reserve and the Campos de Manicoré Environmental Protection Area adjoin the forest to the west, and the Acari National Park lies to the east. The Juma Sustainable Development Reserve is to the north.

== Environment ==
The forest is in the Amazon biome. The forest has great biological wealth, with at least three species of primate and two of birds discovered in the decade before it was created. Vegetation is mainly dense rainforest with some pioneer formations, and has not suffered as much deforestation as other areas of the Amazon. The reserve holds a wide range of palm tree species, and has endangered tree species such as the Bertholletia excelsa, Amburana cearensis var. Acreana, Swietenia macrophylla and Aniba rosaeodora. The region has a variety of environments and diverse fauna, although there have been few studies. The Madeira River basin is estimated to harbor about 800 species of birds, and is an area with many primates including endemic species.

== History ==
Creation of the Aripuanã National Forest and other conservation units created at the same time followed studies by the Chico Mendes Institute for Biodiversity Conservation (ICMBio) with support from the Ministry of the Environment, financed by the Amazon Protected Areas Program (ARPA). The Aripuanã National Forest was created by presidential decree on 11 May 2016. It is administered by ICMBio. The soils are acidic and low fertility, so unsuitable for agriculture or grazing, but the region has been feeling growing pressure from loggers, ranchers and soybean farmers since 2005. The reserve is part of a shield designed to protect the heart of the Amazon forest from the advance of deforestation. The forest will let the local economy grow based on sustainable forest management. It will also help maintain biodiversity and water resource, support scientific research and protect the traditional residents.

The reserve is one of five conservation units created in the last week before the provisional removal of president Dilma Rousseff, totalling 2,600,000 hectares (6,400,000 acres), all in the south of Amazonas state. These were the fully protected Manicoré Biological Reserve with 359,063 hectares (887,260 acres) and Acari National Park with 896,407 hectares (2,215,070 acres), and the sustainable use Campos de Manicoré Environmental Protection Area with 151,993 hectares (375,580 acres), Aripuanã National Forest with 751,295 hectares (1,856,490 acres) and Urupadi National Forest with 537,228 hectares (1,327,520 acres). The same package expanded the Amaná National Forest by 141,000 hectares (350,000 acres).

With these units the Dilma government had created about 3,400,000 hectares (8,400,000 acres) of new protected areas during her administration, compared to about 26,800,000 hectares (66,000,000 acres) by her predecessor Luiz Inácio Lula da Silva. Her administration had also reduced the area of seven protected areas in the Amazon to allow for construction of dams on the Tapajós.

== Sources ==
- FLONA do Aripuanã (in Portuguese), ISA: Instituto Socioambiental
- Floresta Nacional do Aripuanã (in Portuguese), Chico Mendes Institute for Biodiversity Conservation
- Governo cria cinco UCs na Amazônia (in Portuguese), ICMBio: Chico Mendes Institute for Biodiversity Conservation, 12 May 2016
- "No apagar das luzes, governo Dilma cria 5 unidades de conservação", ((o))eco (in Portuguese), 12 May 2016
- PARNA do Acari (in Portuguese), ISA: Instituto Socioambiental
