= Amazon Region Protected Areas Program =

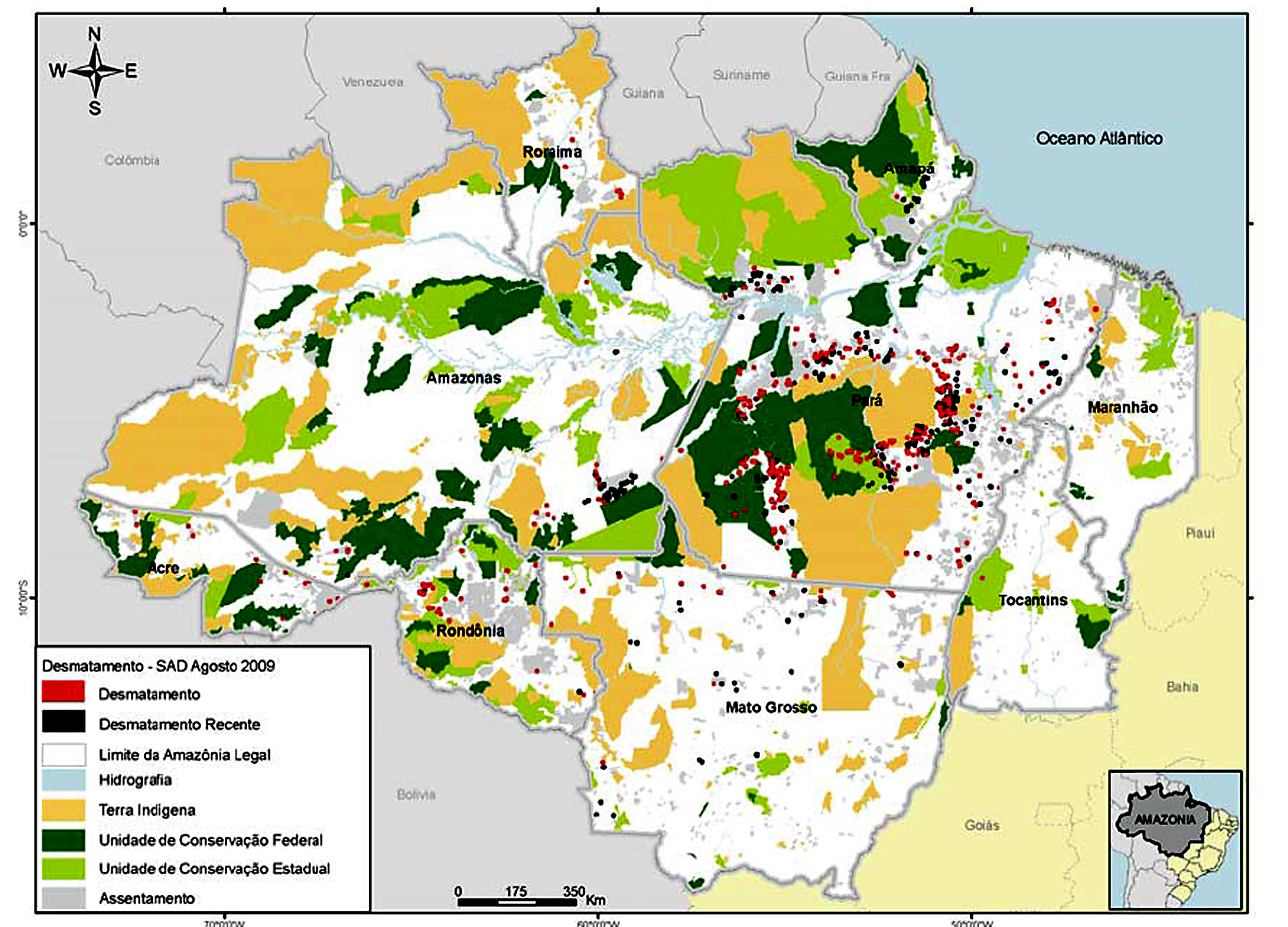
- Protected areas in the Brazilian Amazon
- Abbreviation: ARPA
- Formation: 2003; 23 years ago
- Legal status: Active
- Purpose: Improve conservation of the Brazilian Amazon region
- Website: programaarpa.gov.br/en/

The Amazon Region Protected Areas Program (ARPA; Portuguese: Programa Áreas Protegidas da Amazônia) is a joint initiative sponsored by government and non-government agencies to expand protection of the Amazon rainforest in Brazil.

== Foundation ==
The Amazon Region Protected Areas Program (ARPA) originated in a 1998 promise by the Brazilian government to triple the area of the Amazon that was legally protected. The program was launched in 2003, supported by government agencies, NGOs and major donors. The program is based on a major two-year planning exercise with experts from different disciplines, representatives of the indigenous people and others. This defined a set of priority areas for new parks and reserves throughout the Amazon.

== Objectives ==
Initial objectives were:

- Establish about 283,000 square kilometres (109,000 sq mi) of new strictly protected conservation units of Brazil
- Upgrade about 125,000 square kilometres (48,000 sq mi) of neglected existing parks to effective standards of management
- Establish about 89,000 square kilometres (34,000 sq mi) of sustainable use reserves supported by local communities, and provide effective stewardship
- Establish a US$220 million long-term Protected Areas Trust Fund to ensure perpetual financial viability and integrity of the system

Benefits include protecting habitats, ecosystems and biodiversity, reducing conflicts over land ownership, providing sustainable use options to local communities, creating barriers against deforestation and burning, maintaining forest coverage to lock up carbon and avoid changes to rainfall patterns.

== Organization ==
The program is led by the Brazilian Institute of Environment and Renewable Natural Resources (IBAMA), which coordinates the process of identifying protected areas, creating them by law, preparing management plans and establishing staff and infrastructure. IBAMA works with local government authorities and community members. Implementation is overseen by a steering committee that includes representatives from government agencies and civil society.

The Brazilian government covers core staffing costs. The World Bank oversees additional funding, which is managed by the Brazilian Biodiversity Fund (FUNBIO). Funding is provided by the Global Environment Facility through the World Bank, the government of Germany through the KfW German Development Bank, the World Wide Fund for Nature through WWF-Brazil and the Amazon Fund through the Brazilian Development Bank (BNDES). Conservation units are eligible for disbursements from the fund only when they can show that they comply with rigorous standards.

== Operations ==
The first phase, which cost US$81.50 million, financed creation and consolidation of 180,000 square kilometres (69,000 sq mi) of new protected areas, established the endowment fund, established a system for monitoring biodiversity and supported overall coordination by the Ministry of Environment, IBAMA and the Brazilian Biodiversity Fund. ARPA Phase 2 was to expand the protected areas system, with about 135,000 square kilometres (52,000 sq mi) of new coverage, and to ensure that the program has solid and sustainable finances. It was approved by the World Bank board on 23 February 2012. ARPA resulted in a 68% increase in protected areas and indigenous territories from 2004 to 2012.

In February 2016, it was announced that the federal Ministry of the Environment would include the Serra dos Reis State Park, Samuel Ecological Station and Rio Pacaás Novos Extractive Reserve, all in Rondônia, among the conservation areas supported under ARPA. Rondônia conservation units already covered by ARPA were the Corumbiara State Park, Guajará-Mirim State Park, Rio Preto Jacundá Extractive Reserve, Rio Cautário Extractive Reserve and Serra dos Três Irmãos Ecological Station. The Umirizal Ecological Station would be created. With this expansion the total area covered by ARPA in Brazil rose to 582,960.56 square kilometres (225,082.33 sq mi).

== Conservation units ==
Ecological stations covered by ARPA as of 2016 were:

- Terra do Meio
- Maracá
- Maracá-Jipioca
- Niquiá
- Grão Pará
- Jari
- Rio Ronuro
- Rio Roosevelt
- Juami-Japurá
- Rio Acre
- Serra dos Três Irmãos

State parks covered by ARPA as of 2016 were:

- Cantão
- Chandless
- Corumbiara
- Cristalino
- Guajará-Mirim
- Guariba
- Igarapés do Juruena
- Matupiri
- Rio Negro Setor Norte
- Rio Negro Setor Sul
- Serra Ricardo Franco
- Serra das Andorinhas
- Sucunduri
- Xingu

National parks covered by ARPA as of 2016 were:

- Serra da Cutia
- Serra do Divisor
- Serra do Pardo
- Anavilhanas
- Cabo Orange
- Jamanxim
- Jaú
- Juruena
- Rio Novo
- Campos Amazônicos
- Tumucumaque Mountains
- Nascentes do Lago Jari
- Serra da Mocidade
- Viruá

Biological reserves covered by ARPA as of 2016 were:

- Gurupi
- Jaru
- Lago Piratuba
- Maicuru
- Rio Trombetas
- Tapirapé
- Uatumã

Sustainable development reserves covered by ARPA as of 2016 were:

- Itatupã-Baquiá
- Aripuanã
- Amanã
- Bararati
- Cujubim
- Juma
- Rio Iratapuru
- Rio Madeira
- Rio Negro
- Uatumã
- Igapó-Açu
- Piagaçu-Purus
- Rio Amapá
- Uacari

Extractive reserves covered by ARPA as of 2016 were:

- Alto Tarauacá
- Arapixi
- Arióca Pruanã
- Auati-Paraná
- Baixo Juruá
- Barreiro das Antas
- Canutama
- Catuá-Ipixuna
- Cazumbá-Iracema
- Chico Mendes
- Cururupu
- Guariba
- Guariba-Roosevelt
- Ipaú-Anilzinho
- Ituxi
- Lago Capanã Grande
- Mapuá
- Maracanã
- Médio Juruá
- Médio Purús
- Renascer
- Rio Cajari
- Rio Cautário (Federal)
- Rio Cautário (State)
- Rio Gregório
- Rio Iriri
- Rio Jutai
- Rio Ouro Preto
- Rio Preto-Jacundá
- Rio Unini
- Rio Xingu
- Riozinho da Liberdade
- Riozinho do Anfrísio
- Terra Grande-Pracuúba
- Verde para Sempre

== Sources ==
- Amazon Region Protected Areas (GEF), World Bank
- Amazon Region Protected Areas Program Phase II (GEF), World Bank
- Amazon Region Protected Areas Programme, WWF: World Wide Fund For Nature
- Full list: PAs supported by ARPA, ARPA
- Nepstad, D; McGrath, D; Stickler, C; Alencar, A; Azvedo, A; Swette, B (2014), "Slowing Amazon deforestation through public policy and intervention in the beef and soy supply chain", Science, 344 (6188): 1118–1123, doi:10.1126/science.1248525, hdl:2027.42/138285, PMID 24904156
- "Três Unidades de Conservação de Rondônia são inseridas no programa Áreas Protegidas", Jornal O Nortão (in Portuguese), 24 February 2016, archived from the original on 21 August 2016
- What is Arpa?, ARPA
