= Juma Sustainable Development Reserve =

Sustainable development reserve

- Reserva de Desenvolvimento Sustentável Juma
- IUCN category VI (protected area with sustainable use of natural resources)
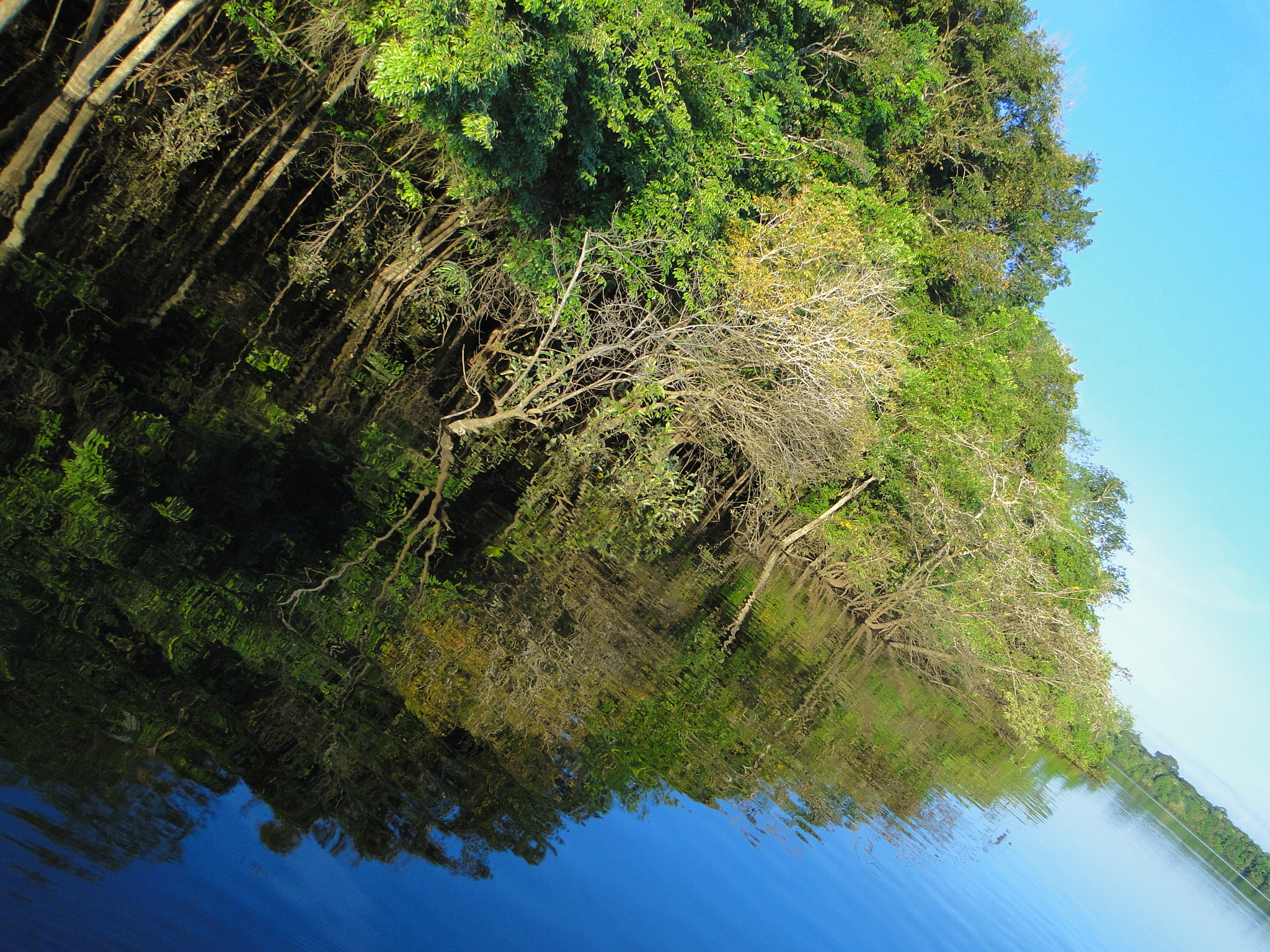
- Vegetation in the reserve

- Location within Brazil
- Nearest city: Novo Aripuanã, Amazonas
- Coordinates: 5.978°S 60.356°W
- Area: 589,611 hectares (1,456,960 acres)
- Designation: Sustainable development reserve
- Created: 3 July 2006
- Administrator: Centro Estadual de Unidades de Conservação do Amazonas

The Juma Sustainable Development Reserve (Portuguese: Reserva de Desenvolvimento Sustentável Juma) is a sustainable development reserve in the state of Amazonas, Brazil. It supports sustainable extraction of the forest resources by the traditional population. It is the first in Brazil to be funded by a REDD (Reducing emissions from deforestation and forest degradation) Project.

== Location ==
Conservation units in the Purus-Madeira interfluvial.: 19. Juma Sustainable Development Reserve

The Juma Sustainable Development Reserve (Juma RDS) is in the municipality of Novo Aripuanã in the state of Amazonas. It has an area of 589,611 hectares (1,456,960 acres). The Mariepauá River, a tributary of the Madeira River, defines the western boundary of the reserve, and the Acari River defines the eastern boundary. The reserve extends north to the Madeira. The northern part of the Aripuanã River runs through the reserve before entering the Madeira near the municipal seat of Novo Aripuanã. The Arauá River, a tributary of the Aripuanã, also runs north through the reserve. The Aripuanã National Forest is to the south of the reserve. The AM-360/AM-174 highway from Apui to Novo Aripuanã runs through the south east portion of the reserve.

An ordinance of 12 November 2007 recognised that there were 157 families of small farmers in the reserve. There are about 11 communities in the reserve engaging in farming, logging, gold mining and extraction of copaiba oil. There are signs of farming dating back 1,500 to 2,000 years. Ceramics and tools such as axes have been found in archaeological sites. The region is threatened by the advance of soy plantations and logging, and by the planned construction of two hydroelectric plants on the upper Aripuanã in Mato Grosso, which would have a profound impact on the biota and landscape.

== Environment ==
The Juma RDS is drained by the clear water Aripuanã River, one of the largest tributaries of the Madeira. It contains dense lowland rainforest, dense submontane rainforest, dense alluvial rainforest, floodplain forest with clear water (várzea) or black water (igapó) and pioneer formations with fluvial or lacustrine influence. The Aripuanã River region is one of the most important in the Amazon region for conservation of biodiversity, with a unique formation of flora including about 242 species. There are 21 species of primates, the highest level of diversity in the world. Three new species of fish have been found, two in the Mariepaua River. 400 species of bird have been identified, and it is estimated that the total may be as many as 600.

== History ==
It is estimated that as of 2007 over 17% of the original Amazon forest had been lost, and that deforestation was accelerating. A simulation model by Soares-Filho and others projected 30% loss by 2050, causing the release of huge volumes of greenhouse gas. In a "business as usual" scenario, paving the BR-319 and AM-174 highways will result in the loss of large areas of forest. The Juma RDS was created by the government of Amazonas as part of an effort to prevent this happening. The potential loss of revenue from forestry was offset by funds from the Juma REDD (Reducing Emissions from Deforestation and forest Degradation) Project, the first such to be implemented under the State Policy on Climate Change. The project was implemented in 2008 by the Fundação Amazonas Sustentável with the help of the Amazonas Department of Environment and Sustainable Development and financial support from Marriott International hotel group.

The Juma Sustainable Development Reserve was created by state decree 26.010 on 3 July 2006. It is administered by the Centro Estadual de Unidades de Conservação do Amazonas. The purpose is to conserve nature and the conditions needed to sustain and improve the way of life of the traditional population, and to enhance, preserve and improve the traditional population's knowledge and techniques for managing the environment and exploiting natural resources. The deliberative council was created on 17 July 2009. The management plan was published in March 2010. It was approved on 22 September 2010. Some of the funding from the REDD program will be used to support the local population, a marginalised and vulnerable group that depends on the forest for survival. The conservation unit is supported by the Amazon Region Protected Areas Program.

== Sources ==
- Full list: PAs supported by ARPA, ARPA
- Projeto de REDD da RDS do Juma (in Portuguese), FAS: Fundação Amazonas Sustentável
- RDS do Juma (in Portuguese), ISA: Instituto Socioambiental
- Viana, Virgilio (March 2010), Plano de Gestão da RDS do Juma (PDF) (in Portuguese)
- Viana, Virgilio; Ribenboim, Gabriel; Cenamo, Mariano Colini (2008), Projeto Reserva de Desenvolvimento Sustentável do Juma: Redução de Emissão de Gases de Efeito Estufa Provenientes do Desmatamento no Estado do Amazonas, Brasil (PDF) (in Portuguese), Fundação Amazonas Sustentável – FAS
