= Bararati Sustainable Development Reserve =

- Reserva de Desenvolvimento Sustentável Bararati
- IUCN category VI (protected area with sustainable use of natural resources)
- Location within Brazil
- Nearest city: Apuí, Amazonas
- Coordinates: 7.678500°S 58.413846°W
- Area: 113,606 hectares (280,730 acres)
- Designation: Sustainable development reserve
- Created: 25 January 2005
- Administrator: Secretaria de Estado do Meio Ambiente do Amazonas

The Bararati Sustainable Development Reserve' (Portuguese: Reserva de Desenvolvimento Sustentável Bararati) is a sustainable development reserve in the state of Amazonas, Brazil.

== Location ==
The Bararati Sustainable Development Reserve (RDS) is in the municipality of Apuí, Amazonas. It has an area of 113,606 hectares (280,730 acres). It is on the left (west) bank of the Juruena River, which forms the boundary between Amazonas and Mato Grosso, above the point where that river is joined by the Teles Pires River to form the Tapajós.

The Apiacás Ecological Reserve is opposite the Bararati RDS on the east side of the Juruena in Mato Grosso. The southern section of the Juruena National Park, also in Mato Grosso, is to the southeast of the reserve. The Sucunduri State Park is to the south of the reserve, and the Apuí State Forest is to the west of the reserve. The northern section of the Juruena National Park is to the north of the reserve.

== Environment ==
The mosaic includes terra firma forest, flooded forest, campos rupestres, campina and campinarana. It contains the headwaters of the Acari and Sucunduri rivers. The Monte Cristo rapids and the Falls (Saltos do Rio Sucunduri) are well-known attractions. The region has more than 13 endemic species of primates. Surveys of the west of the mosaic have identified 850 tree species, 46 mammals, more than 300 birds, 27 reptiles, 30 amphibians and almost 100 species of fish. As of 2005 the total area of deforestation in the Bararati RDS was 268 hectares (660 acres). By 2010 this had risen slightly to 278 hectares (690 acres), or 0.24% of the reserve.

== History ==
The Bararati Sustainable Development Reserve was created by Amazonas state decree 24.813 of 25 January 2005 with the objective of preserving nature, sustain and improve the livelihoods, quality of life and exploitation of natural resources by the traditional population, and to preserve and enhance knowledge and techniques of managing the environment developed by the traditional population. The reserve is an integral part of the Apuí Mosaic, which totals 2,467,243 hectares (6,096,690 acres) in area and contains the Guariba and Sucunduri State Parks; Bararati and Aripuanã sustainable development reserves; Guariba Extractive Reserve; and Sucunduri, Aripuanã, Apuí and Manicoré state forests. The management plan for the Apuí Mosaic was approved on 22 September 2010. This was treated as the management plan for each of the conservation units as well as for the mosaic itself. As of 2016 the reserve was supported by the Amazon Region Protected Areas Program.

== Sources ==
- Full list: PAs supported by ARPA, ARPA
- MOS do Apuí (in Portuguese), ISA: Instituto Socioambiental
- Paulo Amaral; Andréia Pinto; Izabella da Paixão Gomes; Carlos Alexandre da Cunha; Rodney Salomão; Gabriela Galetti (2012), "Reserva de Desenvolvimento Sustentável Bararati" (PDF), Áreas Protegidas no Sul do Estado do Amazonas (in Portuguese), Belém, PA: Imazon, ISBN 978-85-86212-42-0
- RDS Bararati (in Portuguese), ISA: Instituto Socioambiental
- Saiba mais sobre o Mosaico de Apuí (in Portuguese), WWF Brasil, 25 June 2006
