= Guariba State Park =

State park in Amazonas, Brazil

- Parque Estadual do Guariba
- IUCN category II (national park)
- Location within Brazil
- Nearest city: Novo Aripuanã, Amazonas
- Coordinates: 8.697367°S 60.704283°W
- Area: 72,296 hectares (178,650 acres)
- Designation: State park
- Created: 19 January 2005

The Guariba State Park (Portuguese: Parque Estadual do Guariba) is a state park in the state of Amazonas, Brazil.

== Location ==
The Guariba State Park is in the municipality of Novo Aripuanã in the state of Amazonas. It has an area of 72,296 hectares (178,650 acres). It is bounded to the south with the border with Mato Grosso and adjoins the Guariba-Roosevelt Extractive Reserve in Mato Grosso. The Roosevelt River forms its western border. To the west and north it is bounded by the Manicoré State Forest. To the east it adjoins the Guariba Extractive Reserve.

== History ==
The Guariba State Park was created by state governor decree 24805 of 19 January 2005 with the objective of preserving natural ecosystems of great ecological relevance and scenic beauty, supporting scientific research and developing education, environmental interpretation, recreation in contact with nature and eco-tourism. The conservation unit is supported by the Amazon Region Protected Areas Program.

The Apuí Mosaic was created by decree 55 of 12 March 2010 under the responsibility of CEUC in the border region between the states of Amazonas, Mato Grosso and Pará. The mosaic contains the Guariba and Sucunduri State Parks; Bararati and Aripuanã sustainable development reserves; Guariba Extractive Reserve; and Sucunduri, Aripuanã, Apuí and Manicoré state forests. The Southern Amazon Mosaic of conservation units in the region between the states of Amazonas, Mato Grosso and Rondônia was recognised by the federal environment ministry by ordnance 332 of 25 August 2011. It includes the Guariba State Park and other units of the Apuí Mosaic.

== Sources ==
- Full list: PAs supported by ARPA, ARPA
- MOS do Apuí (in Portuguese), ISA: Instituto Socioambiental
- PES do Guariba (in Portuguese), ISA:Instituto Socioambiental
- "Portaria No 332, de 25 de Agosto de 2011" (PDF), Diário Oficial de União (in Portuguese), MMA: Ministério do Meio Ambiente, 26 August 2011
- Saiba mais sobre o Mosaico de Apuí (in Portuguese), WWF Brasil, 25 June 2006
