= Tucano State Forest =

Tucano Sustainable Yield State Forest
- Floresta Estadual De Rendimento Sustentado Tucano
- IUCN category VI (protected area with sustainable use of natural resources)
- Location within Brazil
- Nearest city: Cujubim, Rondônia
- Coordinates: 9.519439°S 62.625767°W
- Area: 660 hectares (1,600 acres)
- Designation: State forest
- Created: 8 October 1996
- Administrator: Secretaria de Estado do Desenvolvimento Ambiental, RO

The Tucano Sustainable Yield State Forest (Portuguese: Floresta Estadual De Rendimento Sustentado Tucano) is a state forest in the state of Rondônia, Brazil.

== Location ==
The Tucano Sustainable Yield State Forest is in the municipality of Cujubim, Rondônia. It has an area of 660 hectares (1,600 acres). It adjoins the larger Mutum State Forest to the east. The forest is in the north east of the state in the Machado River basin, at an altitude of about 100 metres (330 ft). The soils are mostly red-yellow latosols. The forest has a resident population.

== History ==
The forest was originally one of the "blocks" of the 1984 Cujubim settlement project. A management plan for the project's reserves was defined in 1996 in cooperation with the Plan Agropecuario y Forestal de Rondônia (Planafloro: Rondônia Agriculture and Forestry Plan).

The Tucano Sustainable Yield State Forest was created by state decree 7.603 of 8 October 1996 with an area of about 659.56 hectares (1,629.8 acres). The Secretaria de Estado do Desenvolvimento Ambiental (SEDAM) was given administrative responsibility. The purpose was to provide a space for sustained production of renewable forest resources with natural regeneration, to ensure productive capacity of the forest with minimal alteration of ecosystems. The forest is part of the Southern Amazon Mosaic, recognized in 2011.

== Sources ==
- FLORSU Tucano (in Portuguese), ISA: Instituto Socioambiental
- "Portaria No 332, de 25 de Agosto de 2011" (PDF), Diário Oficial de União (in Portuguese), MMA: Ministério do Meio Ambiente, 26 August 2011
