= Manicoré State Forest =

State forest in Brazil

- Floresta Estadual de Manicoré
- IUCN category VI (protected area with sustainable use of natural resources)
- Location within Brazil
- Nearest city: Novo Aripuanã
- Coordinates: 8°44′40″S 60°57′45″W
- Area: 83,381 hectares (206,040 acres)
- Designation: State forest
- Administrator: Secretaria de Estado do Meio Ambiente do Amazonas

The Manicoré State Forest (Portuguese: Floresta Estadual de Manicoré) is a state forest in the state of Amazonas, Brazil.

== Location ==
The Manicoré State Forest is in the Novo Aripuanã municipality of Amazonas. It has an area of 83,381 hectares (206,040 acres).

The Roosevelt River, running north from the state of Mato Grosso, divides the forest into a western and eastern part. To the north both parts of the forest adjoin the Campos Amazônicos National Park. The western part is bounded by the border with the state of Mato Grosso to the south. It adjoins the Rio Roosevelt Ecological Station and the Tucumã State Park in Mato Grosso. The Madeirinha River, a tributary of the Roosevelt River, flows from Mato Grosso in a northeast direction through the western part of the forest. The Roosevelt River separates the western part of the forest from the Guariba State Park, which lies to the east of the river. The eastern part of the forest lies to the north of the Guariba State Park and adjoins the Guariba Extractive Reserve to the east.

== History ==
The Manicoré State Forest was created by state governor decree 24806 of 19 January 2005 with the objective of promoting multiple sustainable uses of the forest resources and scientific research with emphasis on methods of sustainable exploitation of native forests.

== Conservation ==
The forest is an integral part of the Apuí Mosaic, which totals 2,467,243 hectares (6,096,690 acres) in area and contains the Guariba and Sucunduri State Parks; Bararati and Aripuanã sustainable development reserves; Guariba Extractive Reserve; and Sucunduri, Aripuanã, Apuí and Manicoré state forests. With the Juruena and Campos Amazônicos national parks the mosaic forms the Southern Amazon Conservation Corridor, over 9,000,000 hectares (22,000,000 acres) of protected areas designed to resist strong deforestation pressure caused by the advance of the agricultura frontier into the Brazilian Amazon.

== Sources ==
- FES de Manicoré (in Portuguese), ISA: Instituto Socioambiental
- Saiba mais sobre o Mosaico de Apuí (in Portuguese), WWF Brasil, 25 June 2006
