= Protected area mosaic (Brazil) =

Land management unit for conservation efforts in Brazil

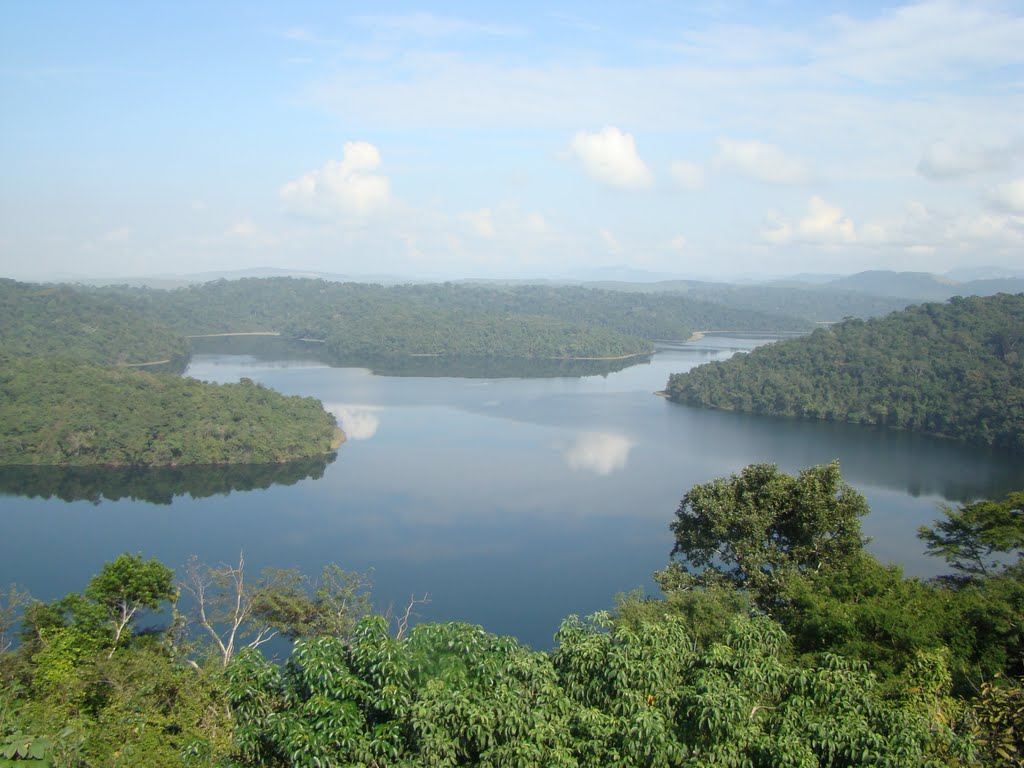
Rio Doce State Park in the Rio Doce Estuary Mosaic

A protected area mosaic (Portuguese: mosaico de áreas protegidas) or conservation unit mosaic (Portuguese: mosaico de unidades de conservação) (Note: The Instituto Socioambiental uses the term "protected area mosaic" in preference to "conservation unit mosaic" to reflect the fact that a mosaic may include private lands and indigenous territories as well as formally designated conservation units.) in Brazil is a mosaic of nearby, adjoining or overlapping protected areas of Brazil that are managed as a whole.

== Definition ==
The National System of Conservation Units (SNUC) law defines a mosaic as a collection of protected areas of the same or different categories that are near to each other, adjoin each other or overlap, and that should be managed as a whole. Given the different categories of conservation unit and other protected areas in a mosaic, including fully protected and sustainable use units, the different conservation goals must be considered. A mosaic may include private lands and indigenous territories.

== Examples ==
The Jacupiranga Mosaic is in the Ribeira Valley and the south coast of the state of São Paulo, with 14 conservation units of various categories. It was created to reconcile the goals of conserving the Atlantic Forest and improving the living conditions of the traditional populations of the area. It originated with the Jacupiranga State Park, created on 8 August 1969, and includes the Rio Turvo and Caverna do Diabo state parks. It also includes four environmental protection areas, five sustainable development reserves and two extractive reserves.

The Itatiaia National Park, created in 1937 as the first national park in Brazil, is part of the Mantiqueira Mosaic and the Mantiqueira Ecological Corridor, part of the larger Serra do Mar Ecological Corridor, which in turn is part of the UNESCO-recognised Atlantic Forest Biosphere Reserve. The park is a vulnerable "conservation island" due to its location between the major cities of Rio de Janeiro and São Paulo.

Brazil has created a mosaic of federal and state conservation units along the BR-319 highway through the Amazon rainforest in an effort to better prevent deforestation when the highway is paved through more efficient management of a larger area. However, WWF-Brazil has pointed out that it is not enough to simply create the protected areas on paper. They must be staffed, delimited, legal owners compensated and so on.

The Terra do Meio Mosaic is in Pará state between the Xingu and Tapajós rivers. It was created after the death of Sister Dorothy Stang, who was campaigning against illegal exploitation of the forests. It includes the Terra do Meio Ecological Station, a strictly protected conservation, created despite the presence of long-standing residents. The residents, who live along the Iriri River, have been placed under intense pressure to evacuate the area.

The Chapada dos Veadeiros National Park in the state of Goiás, Brazil, was expanded by Federal Decree in September 2001 and inscribed as a UNESCO World Heritage Site in December 2001. In 2003 the expansion was successfully challenged and 72% of the national park lost its protection status. The park is part of the Cerrado Biosphere Reserve. Brazil has outlined plans for a mosaic of new conservation units with different management categories covering an equivalent area to the expanded National Park, but UNESCO has questioned whether the mosaic will be sufficient to ensure the statutory protection required for the World Heritage properties.

== Partial list ==
Mosaic	Level	Area (ha)	Created	State(s)
Alto Jequitinhonha - Serra do Cabral Ridge Mosaic	Federal		2010	
Apuí Mosaic	State	2,467,244	2010	Amazonas
BR-319 Provisional Administrative Limitation Area	Federal	15,393,453	2006	Amazonas
Bocaina Mosaic	Federal	221,754	2006	Rio de Janeiro, São Paulo
Carioca Mosaic	Federal		2011	
Central Rio de Janeiro Atlantic Forest Mosaic	Federal	233,710	2006	Rio de Janeiro
Espinhaço Mosaic	Federal	910,000	2010	Minas Gerais
Extreme South of Bahia Mosaic	Federal		2010	Bahia
Golden Lion Tamarin Mosaic	Federal		2010	
Jacupiranga Mosaic	State		2008	São Paulo
Juréia-Itatins Mosaic	State	97,213	2006	São Paulo
Lagamar Mosaic	Federal/State/Municipal	2,119,000	2006	São Paulo, Paraná
Lower Rio Negro Mosaic	Federal	7,329,220	2010	Amazonas
Mantiqueira Mosaic	Federal	445,615	2006	Rio de Janeiro, São Paulo, Minas Gerais
Paranapiacaba Conservation Units Mosaic	State	120,000	2012	São Paulo
Piauí Mosaic	Federal		2005	
Rio Doce Estuary Mosaic	Federal		2010	
Rio Gregório State Forest Mosaic	State	486,319	2008	
Serras Capivara and Confusão Mosaic	Federal		2005	
Sertão Veredas-Peruaçu Mosaic	Federal		2009	
Southern Amazon Mosaic	Federal		2011	Amazonas, Mato Grosso, Rondônia
Terra do Meio Mosaic	Federal			
Tucuruí Mosaic	State	568,667	2002	
West Amapá and North Pará Mosaic	Federal	12,397,338	2013	Amapá, Pará

== Sources ==
- Carolina Motoki (3 September 2015), "Brazilian Government Evicts Communities that Best Preserve the Rainforest", Upside Down World, translated by Holly Holmes
- Cerrado Protected Areas: Chapada dos Veadeiros and Emas National Parks, UNESCO, 2012
- Edison Mariotti (29 February 2016), Mosaico de Unidades de Conservação do Jacupiranga, no Vale do Ribeira e no Litoral Sul, Mata Atlântica do Estado de São Paulo, Brasil. (in Portuguese)
- Mosaicos de áreas protegidas (in Portuguese), ISA: Instituto Socioambiental, archived from the original on 2016-06-20
- Parque Nacional do Itatiaia: Who We Are, ICMBio
- Six new protected areas created in Brazilian Amazonian state, IUCN, 27 March 2009
