= Roosevelt River =

River in Brazil

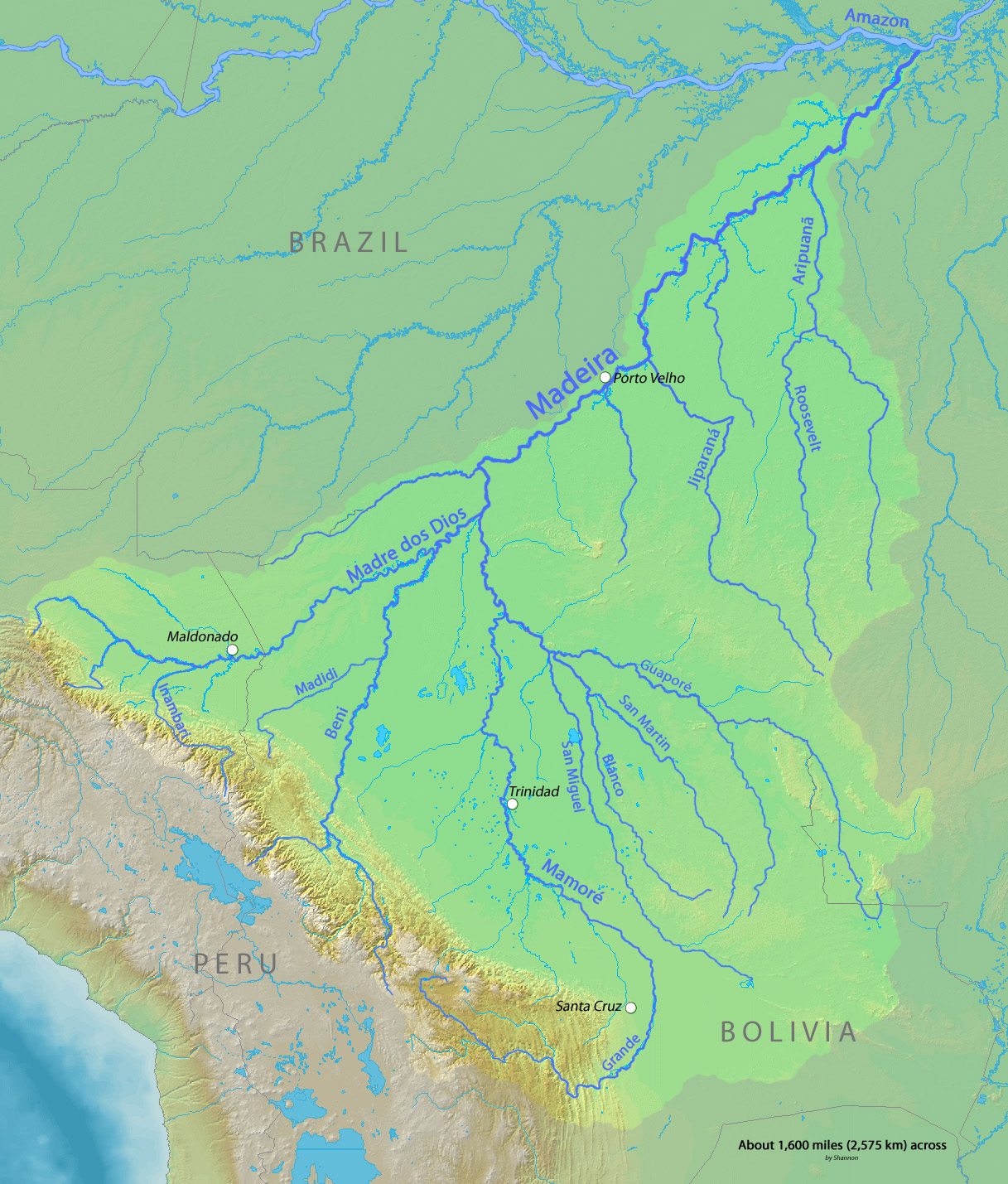
- Madeira Basin with Roosevelt River center-right

Location
- Country: Brazil
- State: Rondônia

Physical characteristics
- Mouth: Aripuanã River
  - coordinates: 7°34′31″S 60°40′33″W
- Length: 760 km (470 mi)
- Basin size: 59,649 km^{2} (23,031 mi^{2})
- Discharge
  - location: mouth
  - average: 1,487 m^{3}/s (52,500 cu ft/s)

The Roosevelt River (Rio Roosevelt, sometimes Rio Teodoro) is a Brazilian river, a tributary of the Aripuanã River about 760 km (470 mi) in length.

== Course ==
The Roosevelt River begins in the state of Rondônia and flows north through tropical rainforest. It is fed by the Capitão Cardoso River, which meets it at the state boundary. In Mato Grosso the river forms the western boundary of the 164,224 hectares (405,810 acres) Guariba-Roosevelt Extractive Reserve, a sustainable use unit created in 1996. After entering Amazonas the river forms the border between the 83,381 hectares (206,040 acres) Manicoré State Forest, a sustainable use conservation unit created in 2005 and the 72,296 hectares (178,650 acres) Guariba State Park, also created in 2005. The river then runs through the Campos Amazônicos National Park, a 961,318 hectares (2,375,470 acres) protected area created in 2006 that holds an unusual enclave of cerrado vegetation in the Amazon rainforest. It continues north until it joins the Aripuanã River. The Aripuanã then flows into the Madeira River, thence into the Amazon.

== History and exploration ==
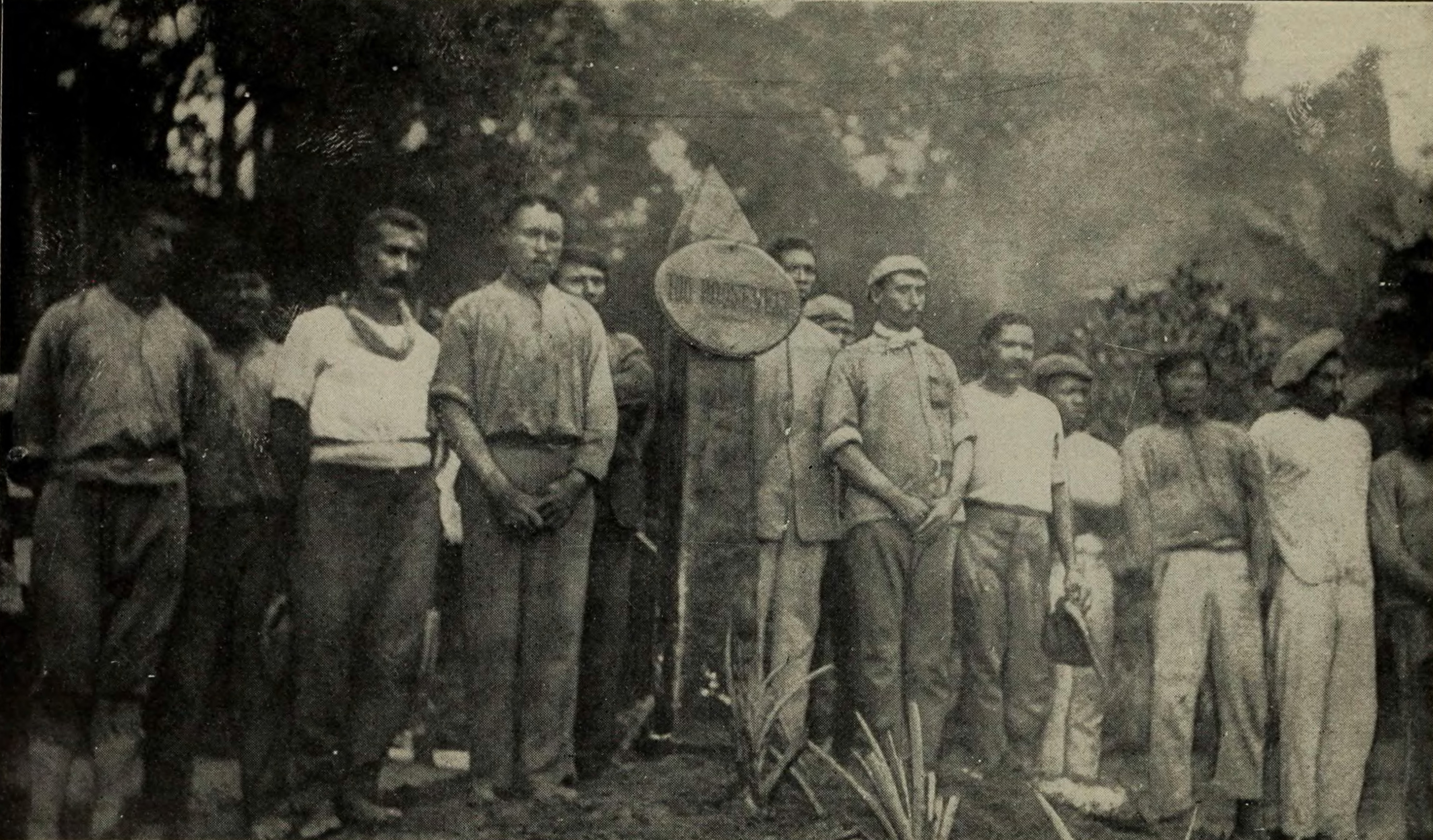

Formerly called Rio da Dúvida (“River of Doubt”), the river is named after Theodore Roosevelt, who traveled into the central region of Brazil during the Roosevelt–Rondon Scientific Expedition of 1913–14. The expedition, led by Roosevelt and Cândido Rondon, Brazil's most famous explorer and the river's discoverer, sought to determine where and by which course the river flowed into the Amazon.

Roosevelt and his son Kermit undertook the adventure after the former U.S. president's failed attempt to regain the office as the "Bull Moose Party" candidate in 1912. Roosevelt's original plan for the expedition was much more leisurely, however upon arrival in South America he was convinced to adopt a more strenuous goal. The Roosevelt-Rondon expedition was the first non-Amazonian-native party to travel and record what Rondon had named the "Rio da Dúvida", then one of the most unexplored and intimidating tributaries of the Amazon. Rondon had spent very little time on the river itself, only discovering its existence several years prior. Its end point was completely unknown. On top of this, sections of the river have impassable rapids and waterfalls, which hindered the expedition.

Still carrying the bullet from his 1912 assassination attempt, Roosevelt, Rondon, and 17 other men set out to map the river's course. Roosevelt’s party entered the River of Doubt on 27 February 1914 and reached its junction with the Aripuanã River on 26 April 1914, after nearly two months (about 58 days) and 470 miles of travel. Roosevelt later wrote Through the Brazilian Wilderness recounting the adventure. In honor of his contributions to its mapping and exploration, the name of Rio de Duvida was changed to the "Roosevelt River". During the descent the explorers endured disease, starvation, frequent capsizings and portages, and the death of a team member. Roosevelt himself nearly died from a tropical infection.

After Roosevelt returned, doubts were raised on his account of the expedition. Roosevelt promptly rebutted them in a public forum in Washington, D.C., sponsored by the National Geographic Society. In 1927, British explorer George Miller Dyott led a second trip down the river, independently confirming Roosevelt's discoveries.

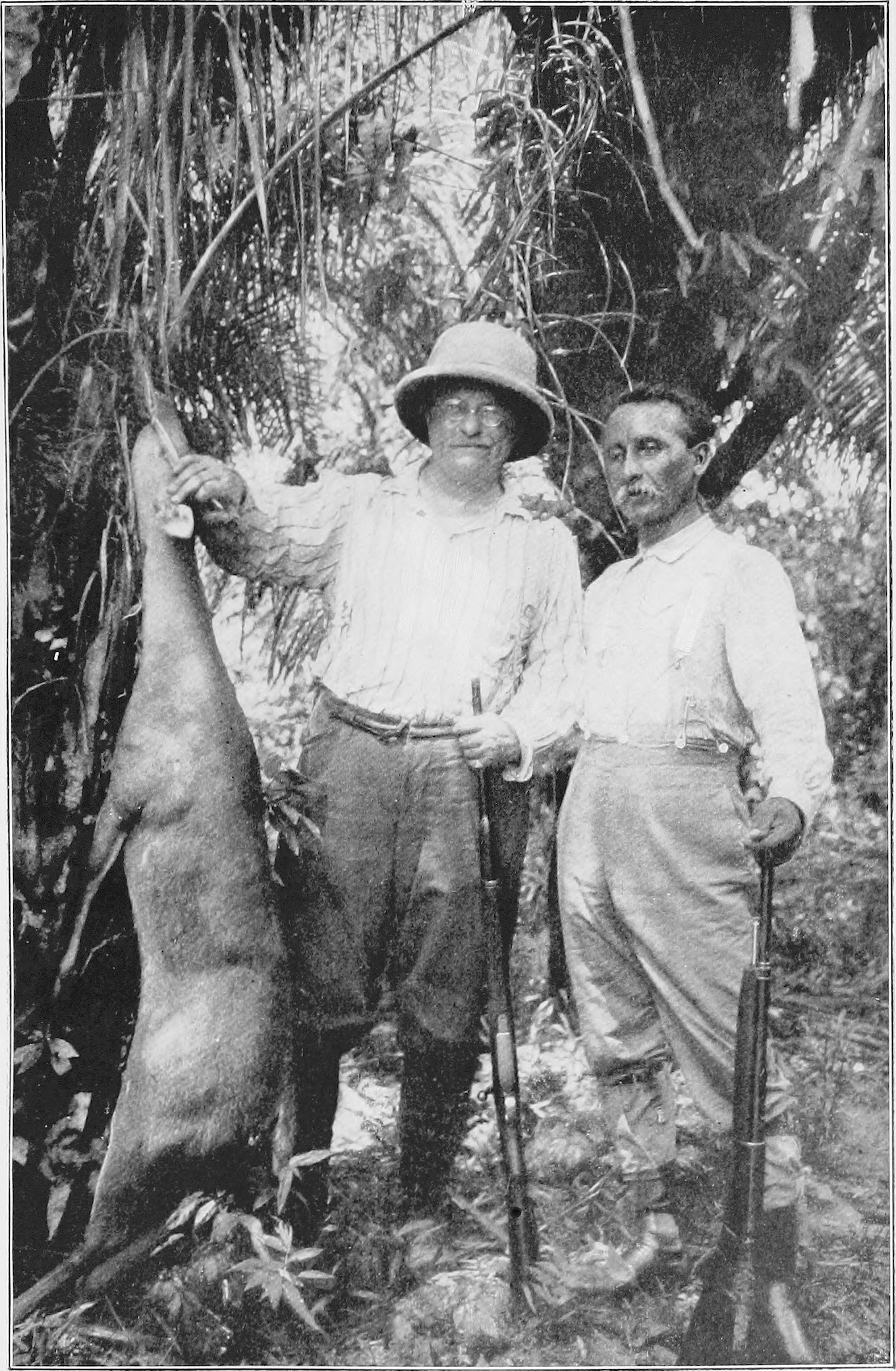
Colonel Theodore Roosevelt and Colonel Rondon

In 1992 a third (modern) expedition was organized, funded, and led by Charles Haskell and Elizabeth McKnight of New Century Conservation Trust, a non-profit environmental education organization in Maine, and sponsored in part by the Theodore Roosevelt Association, the American Museum of Natural History, and the National Wildlife Federation. This expedition consisted of a total of twenty persons including professional river guides Joe Willie Jones, Kelley Kalafatich, Jim Slade, and Mike Boyle, photographers Carr Clifton and Mark Greenberg, cinematographer Joe Kaminsky, Haskell's son Charles 'Chip' Haskell Jr. who served as the expedition's communications expert, Brazilian scientists Geraldo Mendes dos Santos and João Ferraz (ichthyologist and pharmacologist), and chiefs Oita Mina and Tatataré of the Cinta Larga tribe whose land borders much of the river. The expedition took 33 days to complete the nearly 1000-mile journey. While the Roosevelt-Rondon Expedition had to portage almost all of the many rapids on the river with their heavy dugout canoes, the Haskel-McKnight Expedition was able to safely navigate all of the rapids except for one which was portaged. Haskell reported that his expedition "found spots chronicled by the original team, saw plants and insects they described, and went down the rapids that crushed the dugout canoes of 1914". The expedition members were awarded the Theodore Roosevelt Association's Distinguished Service Medal for their achievement. A documentary of the expedition was subsequently produced and aired on PBS called the New Explorers: The River of Doubt narrated by Bill Kurtis and Wilford Brimley. Since this time, the expedition has inspired others to undergo its challenges such as Materials Science Professor Marc A. Meyers, Col. Huram Reis, Col. Ivan Angonese, and Jeffery Lehmann.

== Inhabitants ==
The upper reaches of the Roosevelt River are inhabited by the Cinta Larga people, some of whom the Roosevelt-Rondon Expedition encountered in 1914. The Cinta Larga still remain relatively uncontacted today, but several hostile encounters in the early 20th century led to a violent climax in 1963. The Massacre at 11th Parallel occurred in November 1963 and resulted in the death of 30 Cinta Larga.

The Roosevelt Indigenous Reserve (reserva Roosevelt) was created in 1973 and is managed by FUNAI, occupies 2.7 million hectares (6.7×10^{6} acres), and has a population of 1,200.

== Sources ==
- FES de Manicoré (in Portuguese), ISA: Instituto Socioambiental
- James Brooke (February 25, 1992), "In T. R.'s Footsteps, Scientists Embark on Amazonian Expedition", New York Times
- Millard, Candice (2005), The River of Doubt: Theodore Roosevelt's Darkest Journey, New York: Doubleday, ISBN 0-385-50796-8
- Morris, Edmund (2010). Colonel Roosevelt. New York: Random House. ISBN 978-0-375-50487-7.
- Parna Campos Amazônicos Mapa Interativo (in Portuguese), Chico Mendes Institute for Biodiversity Conservation
- RESEX Guariba-Roosevelt (in Portuguese), ISA: Instituto Socioambiental
- Roosevelt, Theodore (1914). Through the Brazilian Wilderness. New York: C. Scribner's Sons. OCLC 485541.
- Warren E. Leary (April 10, 1992), "Explorers of Amazon Branch Retrace Roosevelt Expedition", New York Times
- Ziesler, R.; Ardizzone, G.D. (1979), "Amazon River System", The Inland waters of Latin America, Food and Agriculture Organization of the United Nations, ISBN 92-5-000780-9, archived from the original on 21 October 2013
