= State forest (Brazil) =

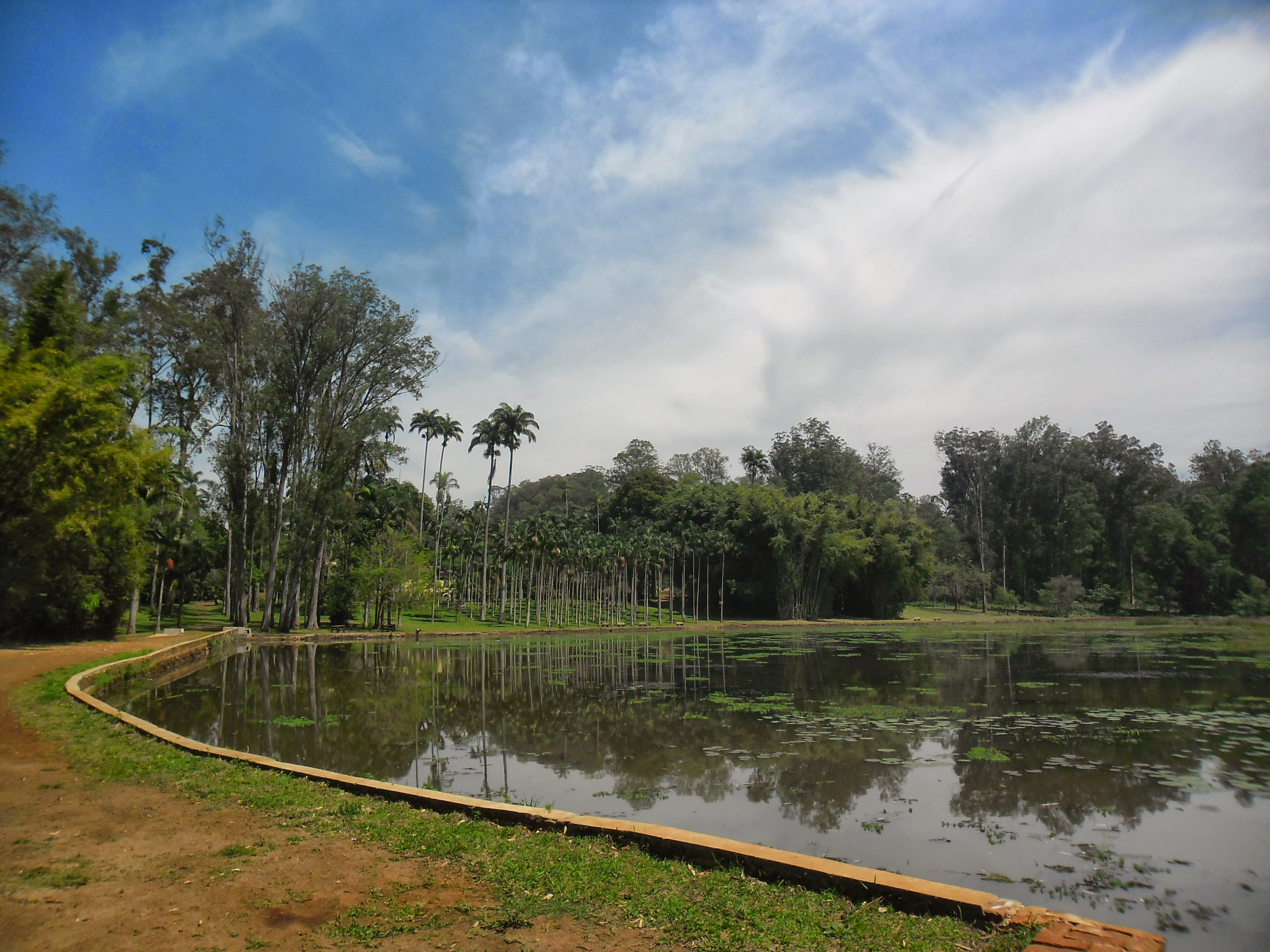
Edmundo Navarro de Andrade State Forest

A state forest (Portuguese: Floresta Estadual, FES) in Brazil is a type of sustainable use protected area managed at the state level. The primary purpose is sustainable exploitation of the forest, subject to various limits. These include a requirement to preserve at least 50% of the original forest, to preserve forest along watercourses and on steep slopes, and so on.

== Definition ==
The concept of the State Forest originated with the 1934 Forest Code. It is equivalent to a national forest, but is administered at the state level. It is an area with forest cover of predominantly native species and has the basic objective of the sustainable multiple use of forest resources and scientific research, with emphasis on methods for sustainable exploitation of native forests. The forest is publicly owned and any private lands in its boundaries are expropriated when it is formed. Indigenous populations may remain in the forest. Public visits are allowed, and research is encouraged, subject to the rules set out by the responsible agency. The responsible agency must prepare and publish a management plan for the forest.

Any new state forests must maintain at least 50% of the original forest coverage, although older forests may have as little as 20%. Properties in the south of Brazil in which the Paraná pine (Araucaria angustifolia) occurs cannot be deforested. Areas with slopes between 24 and 45 degrees cannot be deforested, but lumber may be extracted without clearcutting. Forests along waterways and around springs, on topographical heights, on slopes of more than 45 degrees, in salt marshes, on the edge of plateaus and above 1,800 metres (5,900 ft) may not be touched. The minimum amount of wild coverage must be preserved at each level of the property. Industries that use forest products are expected to invest in forests to meet their needs.

== Examples ==
Examples of state forests include:

Name	State	Area (ha)	Created	Biome
Amapá	Amapá	2,369,400	2006	Amazon
Angatuba	São Paulo	1,196.21	1965	Cerrado
Antimary	Acre	47,064	1997	Amazon
Apuí	Amazonas	185,946	2005	Amazon
Aripuanã	Amazonas	336,040	2005	Amazon
Avaré	São Paulo	95.30	1945	Atlantic Forest
Canutama	Amazonas	150,588	2009	Amazon
Edmundo Navarro de Andrade	São Paulo	2,230	1909	Atlantic Forest
Faro	Pará	613,867	2006	Amazon
Iriri	Pará	440,493	2006	Amazon
Manduri	São Paulo	1,485.10	1962	Atlantic Forest
Manicoré	Amazonas	83,381	2005	Amazon
Maués	Amazonas	438,440	2003	Amazon
Mogno	Acre	143,897	2004	Amazon
Paru	Pará	3,612,914	2006	Amazon
Rio Gregório	Acre	216,062	2004	Amazon
Rio Liberdade	Acre	126,360	2004	Amazon
Rio Madeira	Rondônia	81,856	1990	Amazon
Rio Madeira B	Rondônia	51,856	1996	Amazon
Rio Pardo	Rondônia		2010	Amazon
Rio Urubu	Amazonas	27,342	2003	Amazon
Rio Roosevelt (dissolved)	Rondônia	27,860	1990	Amazon
Rio Vermelho (dissolved)	Rondônia	38,680	1990	Amazon
Sucunduri	Amazonas	492,905	2005	Amazon
Tapauá	Amazonas	881,704	2009	Amazon
Trombetas	Pará	3,172,978	2006	Amazon
Tucano	Rondônia	660	1996	Amazon

== Sources ==
- Decreto Nº 4.340, de 22 de Agosto de 2002, Presidência da República - Casa Civil - Subchefia para Assuntos Jurídicos, August 22, 2002
- "Floresta Nacionais", Amazônia Legal (in Portuguese)
- Florestas (in Portuguese), ISA: Instituto Socioambiental
- LEI No 9.985, DE 18 DE JULHO DE 2000, Presidência da República - Casa Civil- Subchefia para Assuntos Jurídicos, 18 July 2000
- O que são Unidades de Conservação (in Portuguese), ((o))eco, 19 April 2013
