= Igarapés do Juruena State Park =

State park in Mato Grosso, Brazil

- Parque Estadual Igarapés do Juruena
- IUCN category II (national park)
- Location within Brazil
- Nearest city: Cotriguaçu
- Coordinates: 8.883276°S 58.956204°W
- Area: 227,817 hectares (562,950 acres)
- Designation: State park
- Created: 12 November 2002
- Administrator: Coordenadoria de Unidades de Conservação (MT)

The Igarapés do Juruena State Park (Portuguese: Parque Estadual Igarapés do Juruena) is a state park in the state of Mato Grosso, Brazil.

== Location ==
The Igarapés do Juruena State Park is divided between the municipalities of Colniza (44.06%) and Cotriguaçu (55.94%) in the state of Mato Grosso. It has an area of 227,817 hectares (562,950 acres). The park is bounded to the north by the border with the State of Amazonas and the Sucunduri State Park, Sucunduri State Forest and Aripuanã Sustainable Development Reserve in Amazonas. The Aripuanã River defines the western boundary and the Juruena River defines the eastern boundary. The Juruena National Park lies to the east. The Igarapés do Juruena State Park overlaps by almost 53% with the Juruena National Park.

== Environment ==
The Igarapés do Juruena State Park is in the Amazon biome. Vegetation is about 45% dense rain forest and more than 18% contact between savanna and seasonal forest.

== History ==
The Igarapés do Juruena State Park was created by decree 5.438 of 12 November 2002. The consultative council was created on 13 February 2007, and the management plan was approved on 13 February 2009. The members of the consultative council were defined on 17 December 2014. The conservation unit is supported by the Amazon Region Protected Areas Program.

In 2014 the federal government was considering a proposal to declare the Juruena National Park an area of public utility in preparation for constructing two hydroelectric dams in the site, the São Simão Alto and Salto Augusto Baixo. The planned dams had a forecast capacity of 4,940 MW. The National Council for Energy Policy (CNPE) had two seats for civil society members, but these had not been filled. WWF-Brasil led a campaign against the energy project, which would flood an area of over 40,000 hectares (99,000 acres). In September 2014 the federal government withdrew its proposal. The dams would have flooded parts of the Juruena National Park, Igarapés do Juruena State Park and the Escondido and Apiaká do Pontal indigenous territories in Mato Grosso, and would have affected part of the Sucunduri State Park in Amazonas and other indigenous territories.

== Sources ==
- Daniele Bragança (29 September 2014), "Governo desiste de construir hidrelétrica no Parque do Juruena", O Eco (in Portuguese)
- Full list: PAs supported by ARPA, ARPA
- "ONG afirma que Parque Nacional do Juruena corre risco, na Amazônia", portalamazonia.com (in Portuguese), 19 June 2014, archived from the original on 17 August 2016
- Parque Estadual Igarapés do Juruena (in Portuguese), Via Rural, archived from the original on August 6, 2016
- PES Igarapés do Juruena (in Portuguese), ISA: Instituto Socioambiental
