= Sucunduri State Park =

State park in Amazonas, Brazil

- Parque Estadual do Sucunduri
- IUCN category II (national park)
- Location within Brazil
- Nearest city: Apuí, Amazonas
- Coordinates: 8°18′46″S 58°45′45″W
- Area: 808,312 hectares (1,997,380 acres)
- Designation: State park
- Administrator: Ipaam - Instituto de Proteção Ambiental do Amazonas

Sucunduri State Park (Portuguese: Parque Estadual do Sucunduri) is a state park in the state of Amazonas, Brazil.

== Location ==
The Sucunduri State Park is in the municipality of Apuí, Amazonas. It has an area of 808,312 hectares (1,997,380 acres). The Juruena River forms the eastern boundary of the park, separating it from the Juruena National Park in the state of Mato Grosso. To the north the Sucunduri State Park adjoins the Bararati Sustainable Development Reserve, Apuí State Forest, the portion of the Juruena National Park that lies in Amazonas and the Jatuarana National Forest. The park adjoins the Sucunduri State Forest to the west and the Igarapés do Juruena State Park in Mato Grosso to the south.

== History ==
The Sucunduri State Park was created by Amazonas state governor decree 24.810 of 21 January 2005 with the objectives of preserving natural ecosystems of great relevance and scenic beauty, allowing scientific research, education, environmental interpretation, recreation in contact with nature and ecotourism. The state park excluded private property whose owners could prove legal title. It is administered by Ipaam: Instituto de Proteção Ambiental do Amazonas.

In 2014 the federal government was considering a proposal to declare the Juruena National Park an area of public utility in preparation for constructing two hydroelectric dams in the site, the São Simão Alto and Salto Augusto Baixo. The planned dams had a forecast capacity of 4,940 MW. The National Council for Energy Policy (CNPE) had two seats for civil society members, but these had not been filled. WWF-Brasil led a campaign against the energy project, which would flood an area of over 40,000 hectares (99,000 acres). In September 2014 the federal government withdrew its proposal. The dams would have flooded parts of the Juruena National Park, Igarapés do Juruena State Park and the Escondido and Apiaká do Pontal indigenous territories in Mato Grosso, and would have affected part of the Sucunduri State Park in Amazonas and other indigenous territories.

On 17 March 2015 an agreement was made to compensate for the irreversible negative environmental impacts of the Teles Pires hydroelectric project through payment of R$500,000 for use by the park.

== Environment ==
The state park contains the oldest geological domains of the Apuí mosaic, consisting of rocks from the Proterozoic and Paleozoic. These rocks form the Sucunduri Dome between the Aripuanã and Juruena rivers, and cause the many rapids and waterfalls on those rivers. The Bararati River, a left tributary of the Juruena, flows through the park from south to north. The Sucunduri River rises in the park and flows north. It later joins the Acari River to form the Canumã River. The Monte Cristo rapids and the Sucunduri River Falls (Saltos do Rio Sucunduri) are well-known attractions. The Monte Cristo rapids on the Sucunduri is an area with great numbers and diversity of animals and birds. In 2006 it was also the location of an illegal mining settlement. The Augusto Salto on the Juruena has high tourist potential.

The park is in a contact zone between the Amazon rainforest and Cerrado biomes and has a wide diversity of flora including terra firma forest, flooded forest, campos rupestres, campina and campinarana. Vegetation is 52% open rainforest, 32% dense rainforest, 4% savanna-rainforest contact and 12% savannah-seasonal forest contact. Tree species include mahogany, cedar, copaiba, andiroba, Brazil nut and rosewood. Rosewood is the most threatened due to its high economic value. The region has more than 13 endemic species of primates. Surveys of the west of the mosaic have identified 850 tree species, 46 mammals, more than 300 birds, 27 reptiles, 30 amphibians and almost 100 species of fish. Several previously unknown aquatic species have been found.

== Conservation ==
The park is an integral part of the Apuí Mosaic, which totals 2,467,243 hectares (6,096,690 acres) in area and contains the Guariba and Sucunduri State Parks; Bararati and Aripuana sustainable development reserves; Guariba Extractive Reserve; and Sucunduri, Aripuana, Apuí and Manicoré state forests. It is part of the 90,000 square kilometres (35,000 sq mi) Southern Amazon Conservation Corridor, a region under strong deforestation pressure due to the advance of the agricultural frontier into the Brazilian Amazon region. The conservation unit is supported by the Amazon Region Protected Areas Program.

== Sources ==
- Ana Cíntia Guazzelli; Cláudio Maretti (27 June 2006), Pesquisadores encontram espécies que podem ser novas para a ciência, WWF Brasil
- Daniele Bragança (29 September 2014), "Governo desiste de construir hidrelétrica no Parque do Juruena", O Eco (in Portuguese)
- Full list: PAs supported by ARPA, ARPA
- "ONG afirma que Parque Nacional do Juruena corre risco, na Amazônia", portalamazonia.com (in Portuguese), 19 June 2014, archived from the original on 17 August 2016
- Parque Estadual do Sucunduri (in Portuguese), Via Rural, archived from the original on August 6, 2016
- PES do Sucunduri (in Portuguese), ISA: Instituto Socioambiental
- Saiba mais sobre o Mosaico de Apuí (in Portuguese), WWF Brasil, 25 June 2006
