= Sucunduri State Forest =

State forest in the state of Amazonas, Brazil

- Floresta Estadual do Sucunduri
- IUCN category VI (protected area with sustainable use of natural resources)
- Location within Brazil
- Nearest city: Apuí, Amazonas
- Coordinates: 8°18′19″S 59°20′34″W
- Area: 492,905 hectares (1,217,990 acres)
- Designation: State forest
- Created: 20 January 2005

The Sucunduri State Forest (Portuguese: Floresta Estadual do Sucunduri) is a state forest in the state of Amazonas, Brazil.

== Location ==
The Sucunduri State Forest is in the municipality of Apuí, Amazonas. It has an area of 492,905 hectares (1,217,990 acres). It adjoins the Aripuanã Sustainable Development Reserve to the west, which lies on either side of the Aripuanã River. To the south, the border with the state of Mato Grosso separates the forest from the Igarapés do Juruena State Park and the overlapping Juruena National Park. To the east the forest adjoins the Sucunduri State Park. Part of the northern boundary separates it from the Jatuarana National Forest.

== History ==
The park was created by Amazonas governor decree 24808 of 20 January 2005 with the objective of promoting sustainable multiple use of forest resources and scientific research with emphasis on methods of using native forest resources in a sustainable way.

== Conservation ==
The forest is an integral part of the Apuí Mosaic, which totals 2,467,243 hectares (6,096,690 acres) in area and contains the Guariba and Sucunduri State Parks; Bararati and Aripuana sustainable development reserves; Guariba Extractive Reserve; and Sucunduri, Aripuana, Apuí and Manicoré state forests.

== Sources ==
- FES do Sucunduri (in Portuguese), ISA: Instituto Socioambiental
- Saiba mais sobre o Mosaico de Apuí (in Portuguese), WWF Brasil, 25 June 2006
