= Aripuanã Sustainable Development Reserve =

Brazilian nature reserve

- Reserva de Desenvolvimento Sustentável Aripuanã
- IUCN category VI (protected area with sustainable use of natural resources)
- Location within Brazil
- Nearest city: Apuí, Amazonas
- Coordinates: 8.428148°S 59.641381°W
- Area: 224,291 hectares (554,240 acres)
- Designation: Sustainable development reserve
- Created: 21 January 2005
- Administrator: Secretaria de Estado do Meio Ambiente do Amazonas

The Aripuanã Sustainable Development Reserve (Portuguese: Reserva de Desenvolvimento Sustentável Aripuanã) is a sustainable development reserve in the state of Amazonas, Brazil.

== Location ==
The Aripuanã Sustainable Development Reserve is in the Apuí municipality of Amazonas. It has an area of 224,291 hectares (554,240 acres). The reserve lies on either side of the Aripuanã River. It is bounded to the south by the border with the state of Mato Grosso. To the east of the Aripuanã River it adjoins the Igarapés do Juruena State Park in Mato Grosso. To the east it adjoins the Sucunduri State Forest. To the west it adjoins the Aripuanã State Forest.

== History ==
The Aripuanã Sustainable Development Reserve was created by Amazonas state governor decree 24811 of 21 January 2005. The objectives included preserving nature and the conditions needed to preserve and improve the livelihoods, quality of life and use of natural resources of the traditional populations, and preserving and improving knowledge and environmental management techniques of the traditional populations.

== Conservation ==
The reserve is an integral part of the Apuí Mosaic, which totals 2,467,243 hectares (6,096,690 acres) in area and contains the Guariba and Sucunduri State Parks; Bararati and Aripuanã sustainable development reserves; Guariba Extractive Reserve; and Sucunduri, Aripuana, Apuí and Manicoré state forests. The conservation unit is supported by the Amazon Region Protected Areas Program.

== Sources ==
- Full list: PAs supported by ARPA, ARPA
- RDS Aripuanã (in Portuguese), ISA: Instituto Socioambiental
- Saiba mais sobre o Mosaico de Apuí (in Portuguese), WWF Brasil, 25 June 2006
