= Guariba-Roosevelt Extractive Reserve =

Extractive reserve in Mato Grosso, Brazil

- Reserva Extrativista Guariba Roosevelt
- IUCN category VI (protected area with sustainable use of natural resources)
- Location within Brazil
- Nearest city: Colniza, Mato Grosso
- Coordinates: 9.040°S 60.528°W
- Area: 164,224 hectares (405,810 acres)
- Designation: Extractive reserve
- Created: 19 June 1996
- Administrator: Mato Grosso Coordenadoria de Unidades de Conservação

The Guariba-Roosevelt Extractive Reserve (Portuguese: Reserva Extrativista Guariba Roosevelt) is an extractive reserve in the state of Mato Grosso, Brazil. A small traditional population live through fishing, hunting, small-scale agriculture and sale of forest products such as nuts. The reserve is under intense pressure from illegal logging and land grabbing.

== Location ==
The Guariba-Roosevelt Extractive Reserve has an area of 164,224 hectares (405,810 acres) in parts of the Mato Grosso municipalities of Colniza (75%), Aripuanã (22%) and Rondolândia (3%). The park has a highly irregular outline resembling a capital letter A. It lies to the south of the Guariba State Park in Amazonas. The Roosevelt River forms its western boundary and the Guariba River forms the eastern boundary of the northern part of the reserve. Both these rivers originate on the Parecis plateau. The MT-418 highway, which runs west to become the RO-205 highway in Rondônia, crosses the southern part of the reserve.

== Environment ==
The reserve is the only state extractive reserve in Mato Grosso, and one of the last strongholds of traditional extraction. It is mainly in the Amazon biome, with a sub-humid warm tropical climate. Fauna include jaguar, tapir, black caiman, ocelot, capuchin monkey, six-banded armadillo, paca, agouti and birds such as barn swallow, swallow-tailed kite, solitary tinamou and gulls. The extractive products include nuts and rubber, and the community hunts and fishes. The reserve is threatened by illegal logging and poaching.

The reserve is the last frontier of deforestation in Mato Grosso. Illegal loggers destroy the environment and also endanger the lives of traditional residents and un-contacted Indians living on the border of the unit. In October 2015 state employees arrested six people in the act of illegally felling trees and processing the wood. They seized a large tractor, 80 logs and a motorcycle, and were searching for two other vehicles used to remove forest products. Infrastructure built by the criminals include two wooden bridges. As of 2016 about 300 people from a unique traditional community were living in the area. Their presence was important in protecting the indigenous tribes living beside the reserve and maintaining the biodiversity in an area where a new species on monkey had recently been discovered.

== History ==
The Guariba-Roosevelt Extractive Reserve has a complex history of decrees by the Mato Grosso governor, laws by the Mato Grosso legislature and judicial orders. The reserve was created by decree 952 of 19 June 1996, the responsibility of the Mato Grosso Coordenadoria de Unidades de Conservação. Law 7.164 of 23 August 1999 recreated the reserve with an area of about 57,630 hectares (142,400 acres).

The conservation unit is supported by the Amazon Region Protected Areas Program. Law 8.680 of 13 July 2007 expanded the Rio Roosevelt Ecological Station by more than 43,168 hectares (106,670 acres) and expanded the Guariba-Roosevelt Extractive Reserve by more than 80,462 hectares (198,830 acres), giving the reserve an area of about 138,092 hectares (341,230 acres). This expansion was to compensate for the settlements in the municipalities of Terra Nova do Norte and Nova Guarita in the "4 Reservas" area. The deliberative council was created on 20 October 2009, and the utilisation plan was approved on 9 March 2011.

On 19 April 2013 law 8680 of 2007 was revoked by Judge Alexandre Mendes Socrates, who stated that the extractive reserve was illegally occupied by squatters, had very little environmental protection, would soon be as devastated as the "4 Reservas" area and therefore could not be considered compensation for the settlement of "4 Reservas". An extractive reserve was intended to support sustainable management by traditional populations. Law 10261 of 22 January 2015 repealed law 8.680 of 2007. The law found that the total original area of the two conservation units, 110,630 hectares (273,400 acres), would serve to replace the "4 Reservas" area.

Decree 59 of 13 April 2015 expanded the area of the extractive reserve to a total of about 164,224 hectares (405,810 acres), with a perimeter of 654.74 kilometres (406.84 mi). There were continued discussions on the limits of the reserve in the legislative committee during 2015. In March 2016 the legislative assembly approved maintaining the area of the extractive reserve by four votes. The conservation units coordinator stressed the importance of the reserve, which faced land grabbing and illegal logging, saying that reducing the area would reward those who are trying to gain ownership of public land.

== Sources ==
- "Câmara Setorial mantém área da Resex Guariba-Roosevelt, em Colniza", Portal Amazonia (in Portuguese), 17 March 2016, archived from the original on 25 June 2016
- Full list: PAs supported by ARPA, ARPA
- José Luis Laranja (7 July 2015), Assembleia debate limites territoriais de reservas extrativistas (in Portuguese), Assembleia Legislativa do Estado de Mato Grosso
- RESEX Guariba-Roosevelt (in Portuguese), ISA: Instituto Socioambiental
- Rose Domingues (21 October 2015), "Resex Guariba Roosevelt: Operação prende 6 pessoas por extração ilegal de madeira", Agua Boa News (in Portuguese), archived from the original on 24 June 2016
