= Campos Amazônicos National Park =

National park in Brazil

- Parque Nacional Campos Amazônicos
- IUCN category II (national park)
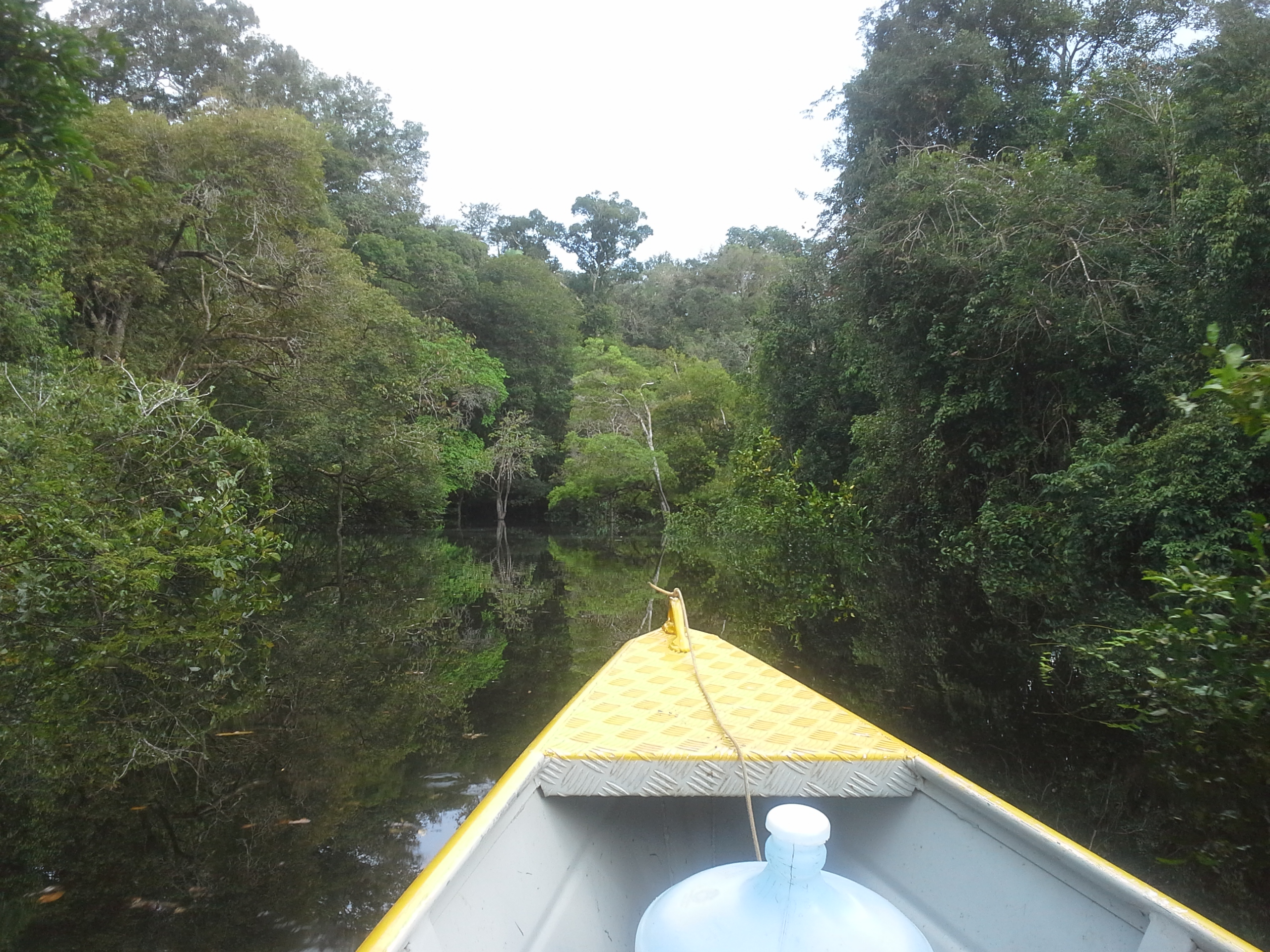
- Flooded forest in the park

- Location within Brazil
- Nearest city: Machadinho d'Oeste, Rondônia
- Coordinates: 8.455267°S 61.128342°W
- Area: 961,317.77 hectares (2,375,467.9 acres)
- Designation: National park
- Created: 21 June 2006
- Administrator: Chico Mendes Institute for Biodiversity Conservation

The Campos Amazônicos National Park (Portuguese: Parque Nacional dos Campos Amazônicos) is a National park in the states of Rondônia, Amazonas and Mato Grosso, Brazil.

== Location ==
The Campos Amazônicos National Park covers parts of the municipalities of Novo Aripuanã (66.69%), Manicoré (14.73%) and Humaitá (5.01%) in Amazonas, Machadinho d'Oeste (12.91%) in Rondônia and Colniza (0.38%) in Mato Grosso. It has an area of 961,317.77 hectares (2,375,467.9 acres). The park lies to the south of the Trans-Amazonian Highway (BR-230) in Amazonas. It is bordered to the south by the Tucumã State Park in Mato Grosso and the Manicoré State Forest and Guariba Extractive Reserve in Amazonas.

The Roosevelt River flows through the park from south to north. The Jiparaná River (Machado River) forms the park's southern boundary in Rondônia. The terrain is generally flat, with some gently rolling stretches. It is laced with slow, meandering rivers. It contains parts of the basins of the Machado and Roosevelt rivers, and contains the headwaters of the dos Marmelos and Manicoré rivers.

== Environment ==
The Campos Amazônicos National Park is in the Amazon biome. Average annual rainfall is 2,300 millimetres (91 in). Temperatures range from 12 to 32 °C (54 to 90 °F) with an average of 27 °C (81 °F). The park holds an important enclave of cerrado including grasslands, campos sujos and cerradão in the areas of contact with the forest, and gallery forest in the wetlands. It also contains typical Amazon dense rainforest and open rainforest. Coverage is 18% open rainforest, 42% dense rainforest, 12% savanna-rainforest contact and 28% savanna-pioneer formation contact.

Few detailed studies of flora and fauna have been undertaken. The Manicore marmoset (Mico manicorensis) was discovered in the forest. The savanna enclaves are seen by biologists as important in understanding the evolutionary dynamics of the Amazonian biota. There is high diversity of birds. The forest may provide a breeding ground for several commercially important species of fish. Mixed groups of woolly monkeys and white-nosed saki (Chiropotes albinasus) have been observed, an unusual occurrence in the Amazon.

== History ==
The Campos Amazônicos National Park was created by decree of 21 June 2006 with an area of about 873,570 hectares (2,158,600 acres) to protect biological diversity and ecological processes in the region between the Machado, Branco, Roosevelt and Guaribas rivers. Part of the Roosevelt river was excluded from the park but was within its buffer zone. If another part of the buffer zone is excluded the actual park area was about 823,000 hectares (2,030,000 acres). Settlers in areas created by INCRA under the law of 15 September 1965 were to receive compensation. An ordinance of 16 June 2011 approved the management plan, with the buffer zone to be established later.

Law 12678 of 25 June 2012 amended the limits of the Amazônia, Campos Amazônicos and Mapinguari national parks, the Itaituba I, Itaituba II and Crepori national forests and the Tapajós Environmental Protection Area. All of these were reduced in size except the Campos Amazônicos, which was increased by a net 133,000 hectares (330,000 acres) including land added and removed. Excluded land also included the area to be flooded by the Tabajara Dam for hydroelectric power generation. The excluded land in the north of the park was to regularize occupation of public land and to provide a place to move people displaced by the new area added to the park. Mining activities were authorised in the buffer zone.

An advisory council was created on 21 November 2012. The management plan was approved on 15 May 2016.

== Conservation ==
The Campos Amazônicos National Park is administered by the Chico Mendes Institute for Biodiversity Conservation (ICMBio). The park is classed as IUCN protected area category II (national park). The objective is to preserve a natural ecosystem of great ecological relevance and scenic beauty, and to support scientific research, environmental education and interpretation, outdoors recreation and ecotourism. Specifically it protects the main cerrado enclave in the Amazon and contains the advance of the agricultural frontier in this region. The park is home to great biodiversity and endemic species. Protected species include Leopardus tigrinus, Leopardus wiedii, Panthera onca and Pteronura brasiliensis.

The park forms part of an ecological corridor, that includes Xingu Indigenous Park in Mato Grosso and Pará, the Terra do Meio Mosaic in Pará, the Juruena National Park in Amazonas and Mato Grosso, the Apuí Mosaic in Amazonas and then the Campos Amazônicos National Park. The corridor is intended to contain agricultural expansion into the central Amazon region and deforestation of the rainforest. The park is supported by the Amazon Region Protected Areas Program. The park is at risk of being damaged by the expansion of the agricultural frontier, with land grabbing and burning, accessed by the Trans-Amazonian highway, the Tin Highway (rodovia do Estanho) and settlers from the northern Mato Grosso.

== Sources ==
- Creation of a (mega) conservation corridor aims to reduce fundamental conflicts, 26 June 2006
- FES de Manicoré (in Portuguese), ISA: Instituto Socioambiental
- Full list: PAs supported by ARPA, ARPA
- Parna Campos Amazônicos Mapa Interativo (in Portuguese), Chico Mendes Institute for Biodiversity Conservation, archived from the original on 2016-08-17
- Parna Campos Amazônicos (in Portuguese), Chico Mendes Institute for Biodiversity Conservation, archived from the original on 2016-08-17
- PARNA dos Campos Amazônicos (in Portuguese), ISA: Instituto Socioambiental
- Parque Nacional dos Campos Amazônicos (in Portuguese), Via Rural, archived from the original on 2016-06-10
- Unidade de Conservação: Parque Nacional dos Campos Amazônicos (in Portuguese), MMA: Ministério do Meio Ambiente
- Unidade de Conservação: Parque Nacional do Juruena (in Portuguese), MMA: Ministério do Meio Ambiente
