= Novo Aripuanã =

Municipality of Amazonas, Brazil

- Municipality
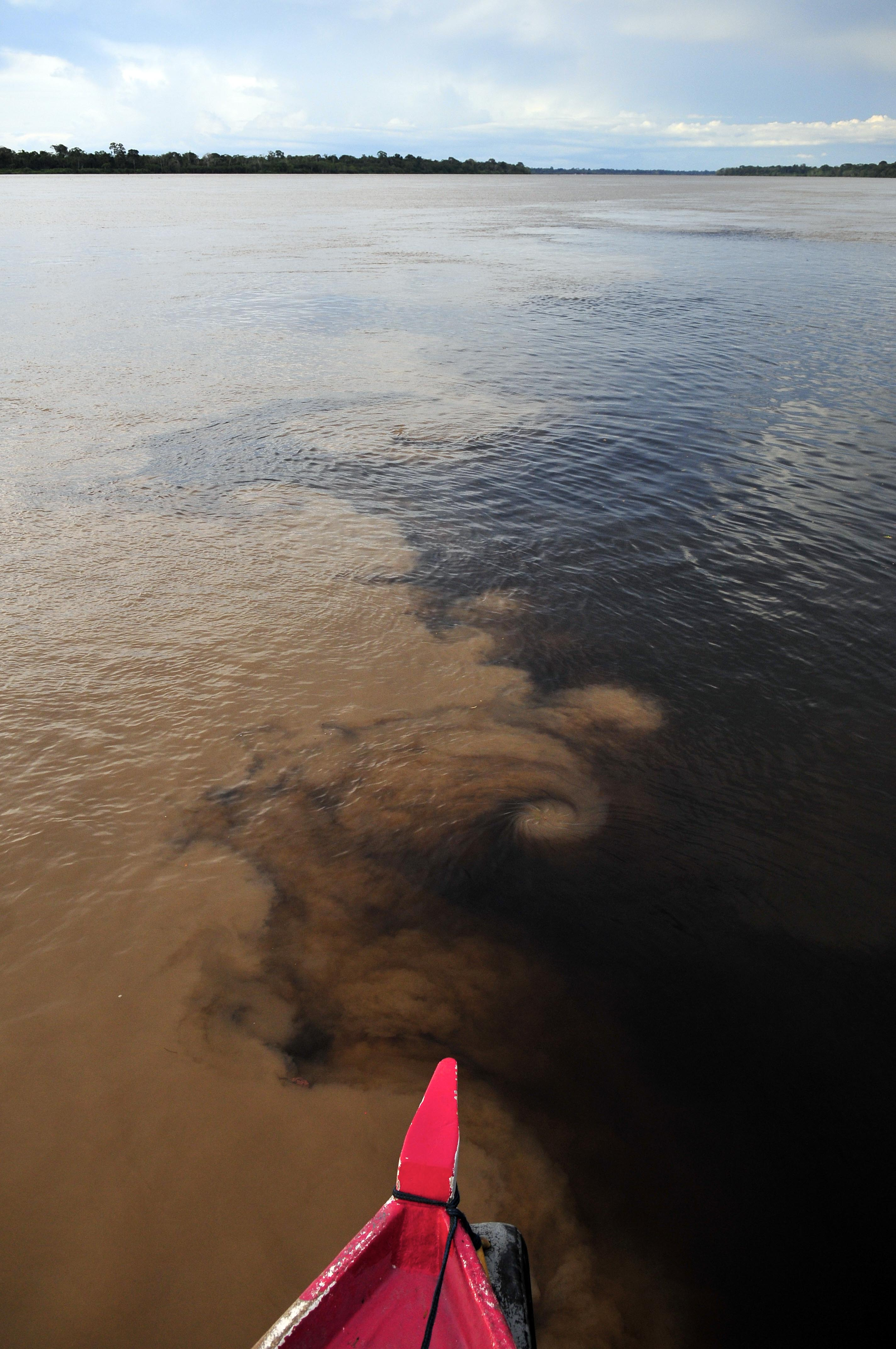
- The confluence of the Madeira River (brown) and Aripuanã River (dark) near Novo Aripuanã.

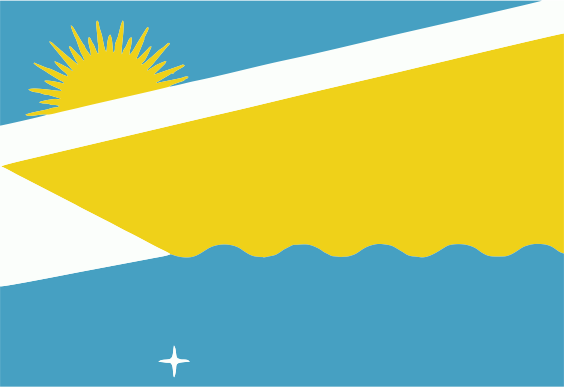
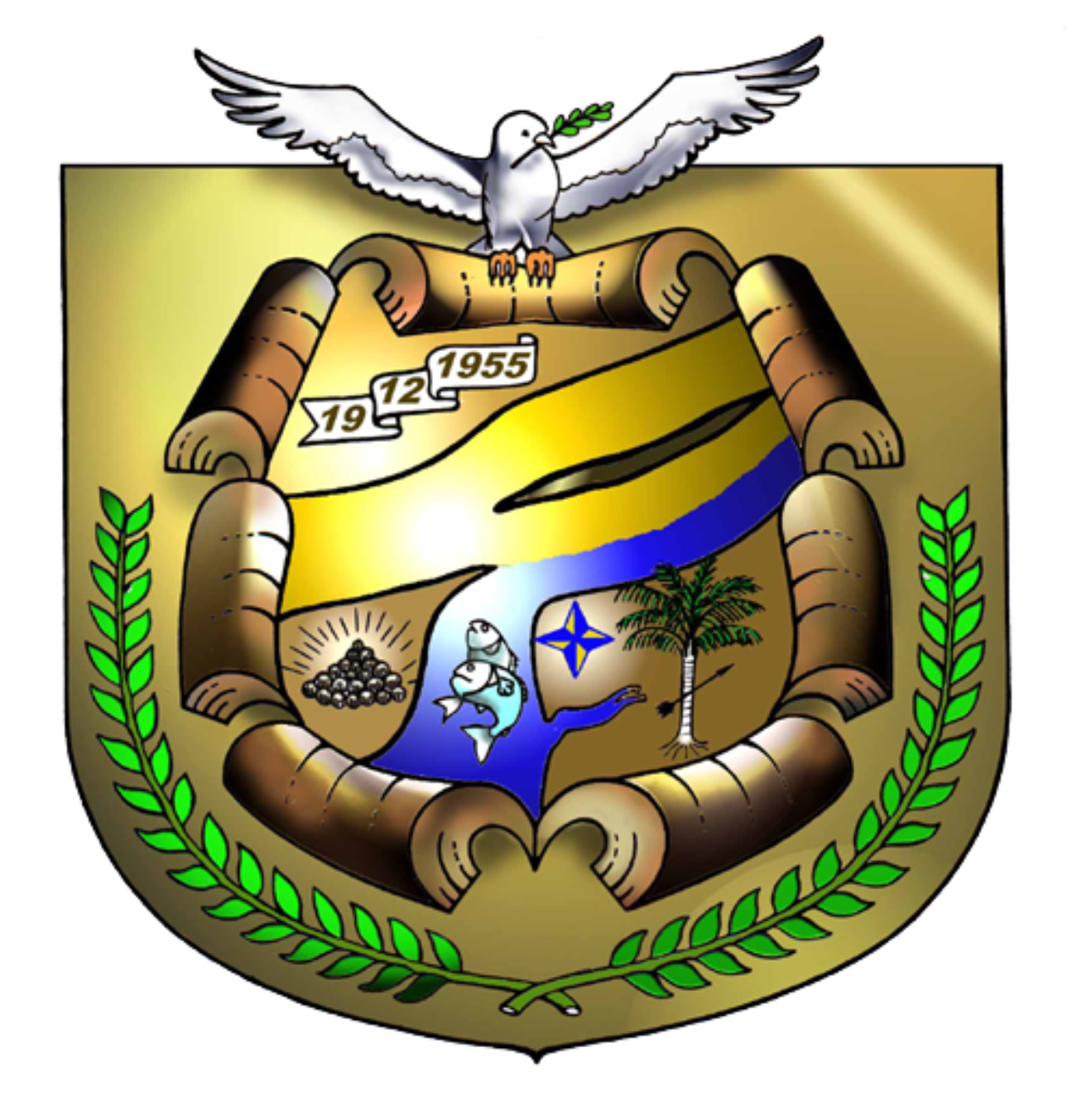
- Flag Coat of arms

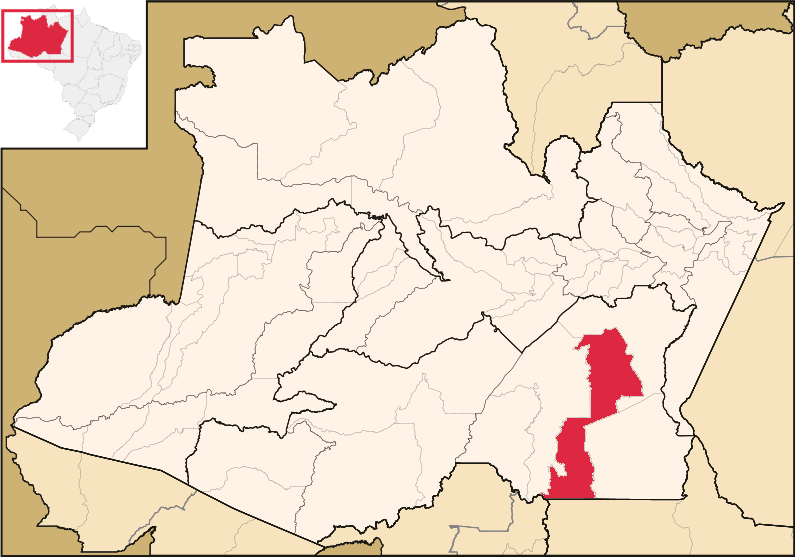
- Amazonas state with Novo Aripuanã municipality in red
- Coordinates: 5°07′17″S 60°22′50″W
- Country: Brazil
- Region: North
- State: Amazonas

Area
  - Total: 41,191 km^{2} (15,904 sq mi)

Population (2020)
  - Total: 26,046
- Time zone: UTC−4 (AMT)

Novo Aripuanã is a municipality located in the Brazilian state of Amazonas.

== History ==
The region was originally inhabited by the Toras, Barés, Muras, Urupás, Araras and other indigenous peoples. The first records of European penetration to the Madeira River are from 1637, when Pedro Teixeira travelled from Belém to Quito in Ecuador. The municipality of Novo Aripuanã was created by state law 96 of 19 December 1955 from parts of the municipalities of Borba and Manicoré. It contained the district of Foz do Aripuanã with the sub-districts of Alvorada, Manicorezinho and Itapinima, and the district of Sumaúma with the sub-districts of Alvorada, Manicorezinho and Itapinima. The town of Foz do Aripuanã was elevated to the status of a city, named Novo Aripuanã. The first prefect of the municipality, Wilson Paula de Sá, took office on 10 February 1956.

== Geography ==
=== Location ===
Novo Aripuanã has an area of 41.191 square kilometres (15.904 sq mi). The population as of 2020 was 26,046. The seat of the municipality is located where the Aripuanã River merges into the Madeira River.

=== Conservation ===
The municipality contains 8% of the 2,467,244-hectare (6,096,690-acre) Apuí Mosaic, a jointly-managed collection of conservation units. It contains the 83,381-hectare (206,040-acre) Manicoré State Forest, a sustainable use conservation unit created in 2005. It contains 39% of the 283,117-hectare (699,600-acre) Rio Madeira Sustainable Development Reserve, created in 2006. It contains the 589,611-hectare (1,456,960-acre) Juma Sustainable Development Reserve, created in 2006 to support sustainable extraction of forest resources by the traditional population. It contains 67% of the Campos Amazônicos National Park, a 961,318-hectare (2,375,470-acre) protected area created in 2006 that protects an unusual enclave of cerrado vegetation in the Amazon rainforest. It contains the 72,296-hectare (178,650-acre) Guariba State Park, created in 2005. It contains 28% of the 150,465-hectare (371,810-acre) Guariba Extractive Reserve, also created in 2005.

The municipality contains about 45% of the 359,138-hectare (887,450-acre) Manicoré Biological Reserve, created by decree in May 2016 in the week before the provisional removal of president Dilma Rousseff. It also contains 29% of the 896,411-hectare (2,215,080-acre) Acari National Park, which was created at the same time. The municipality contains about 74% of the 751,302-hectare (1,856,510-acre) Aripuanã National Forest, a sustainable development unit also created at that time.

== Sources ==
- FES de Manicoré (in Portuguese), ISA: Instituto Socioambiental
- FLONA do Aripuanã (in Portuguese), ISA: Instituto Socioambiental
- MOS do Apuí (in Portuguese), ISA: Instituto Socioambiental
- Novo Aripuanã, Amazonas - AM: Histórico (PDF) (in Portuguese), IBGE: Instituto Brasileiro de Geografia e Estatística
- PARNA do Acari (in Portuguese), ISA: Instituto Socioambiental
- PARNA dos Campos Amazônicos (in Portuguese), ISA: Instituto Socioambiental
- PES do Guariba (in Portuguese), ISA:Instituto Socioambiental
- RDS do Juma (in Portuguese), ISA: Instituto Socioambiental
- REBIO do Manicoré (in Portuguese), ISA: Instituto Socioambiental
- RDS do Rio Madeira (in Portuguese), ISA: Instituto Socioambiental
- RESEX do Guariba (in Portuguese), ISA: Instituto Socioambiental
