= Apuí =

Municipality of Amazonas, Brazil

- Municipality
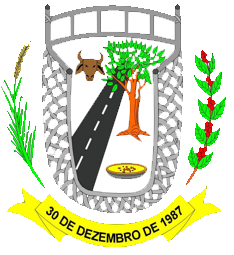
- Flag Coat of arms

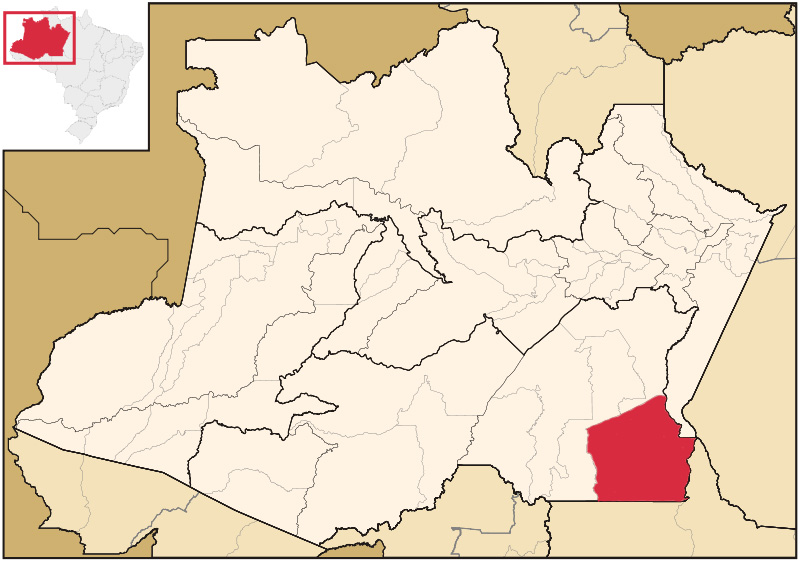
- Location of the municipality inside Amazonas
- Coordinates: 7°11′49″S 59°53′27″W
- Country: Brazil
- Region: North
- State: Amazonas

Population (2020)
  - Total: 22,359
- Time zone: UTC−4 (AMT)
- Climate: Am

Apuí is a municipality located in the Brazilian state of Amazonas. Its population was 22,359 (2020) and its area is 54,240 km^{2}.

== Gold rush ==
The municipality shot to fame in December 2006, when a Brazilian maths teacher by the name of Ivani Valentim da Silva posted descriptions of miners scooping up thousands of dollars in gold in the area. In just three months, between 3,000 and 10,000 people poured into the area, cutting down trees, diverting streams and digging wildcat mines. The city was nicknamed Eldorado do Juma after the mythical El Dorado.

== Geography ==
=== Conservation ===
The municipality contains 92% of the 2,467,244-hectare (6,096,690-acre) Apuí Mosaic, a jointly-managed collection of conservation units. It contains the 808,312-hectare (1,997,380-acre) Sucunduri State Park, created in 2005. It also contains the 492,905-hectare (1,217,990-acre) Sucunduri State Forest, a sustainable use conservation unit created in 2005. It contains 72% of the 150,465-hectare (371,810-acre) Guariba Extractive Reserve, also created in 2005. It also contains the 113,606-hectare (280,730-acre) Bararati Sustainable Development Reserve, created at the same time.

The municipality contains part of the 1,958,200-hectare (4,839,000-acre) Juruena National Park, one of the largest conservation units in Brazil, created by decree on 5 June 2006. It also contains part of the 896,411-hectare (2,215,080-acre) Acari National Park created by president Dilma Rousseff in 2016 in the last week before her provisional removal from office. The municipality contains about 17% of the 751,302-hectare (1,856,510-acre) Aripuanã National Forest, a sustainable development unit created at the same time.

== Transportation ==
The city is served by Apuí Airport.

== Sources ==
- FES do Sucunduri (in Portuguese), ISA: Instituto Socioambiental
- FLONA do Aripuanã (in Portuguese), ISA: Instituto Socioambiental
- MOS do Apuí (in Portuguese), ISA: Instituto Socioambiental
- PARNA do Acari (in Portuguese), ISA: Instituto Socioambiental
- PES do Sucunduri (in Portuguese), ISA: Instituto Socioambiental
- RDS Bararati (in Portuguese), ISA: Instituto Socioambiental
- RESEX do Guariba (in Portuguese), ISA: Instituto Socioambiental
- Unidade de Conservação: Parque Nacional do Juruena (in Portuguese), MMA: Ministério do Meio Ambiente
