= Aripuanã River =

River in Brazil

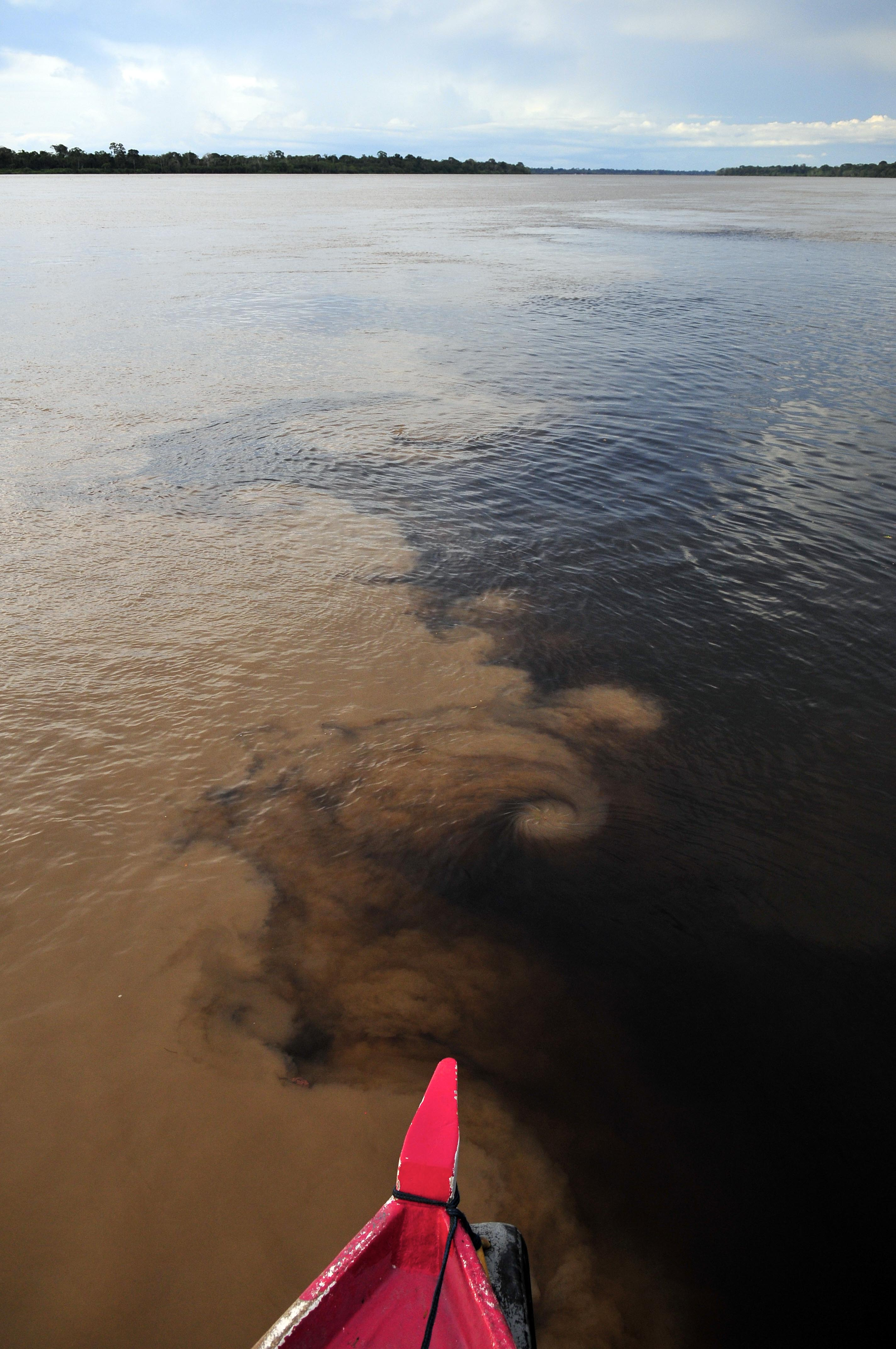
- The confluence of the Madeira River (brown) and Aripuanã River (dark) near the town of Novo Aripuanã. Despite its color on this photo, Aripuanã is clearwater rather than a blackwater.

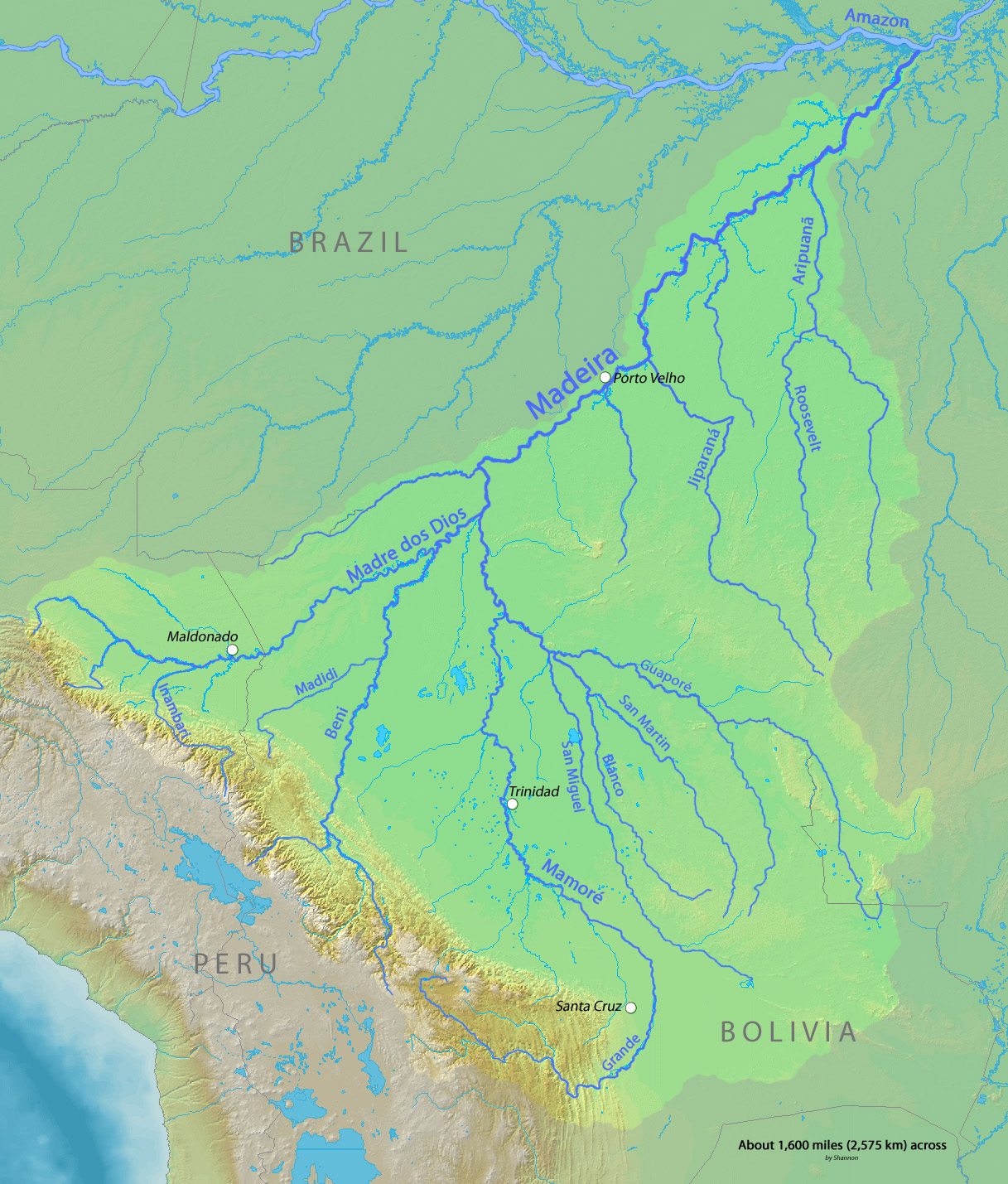
- Madeira Basin with Aripuanã River above right. At the junction the right branch (opposite Roosevelt River) is a continuation of the Aripuanã. The uppermost (southern) section of the Aripuanã is not shown

Location
- Country: Brazil

Physical characteristics
- Source
  - location: Mato Grosso, Brazil
  - elevation: 391 m (1,283 ft)
- Mouth: Madeira River
  - location: Novo Aripuanã, Amazonas, Brazil
  - coordinates: 5°7′7″S 60°22′55″W
  - elevation: 19 m (62 ft)
- Length: 870 km (540 mi)
- Basin size: 145,852 km^{2} (56,314 mi^{2}) to 147,224 km^{2} (56,844 mi^{2})
- Discharge
  - location: Novo Aripuanã, Amazonas (near mouth)
  - average: 4,064 m^{3}/s (143,500 cu ft/s)(Period: 1979–2015) 4,087.3 m^{3}/s (144,340 cu ft/s)
  - minimum: 1,133 m^{3}/s (40,000 cu ft/s)
  - maximum: 8,188 m^{3}/s (289,200 cu ft/s)

Basin features
- Progression: Madeira → Amazon → Atlantic Ocean
- River system: Amazon
- Tributaries
  - left: Juma, Roosevelt, Guaribe, Branco
  - right: Arauá

Aripuanã River (Portuguese: Rio Aripuanã) is a river in the Mato Grosso and Amazonas states in north-western Brazil. It is a tributary of the Madeira River in the Amazon Basin. The town of Novo Aripuanã is located on its banks where it merges into the Madeira River. The town of Aripuanã is also on its banks, but on the upper (southern) section of the river.

The Aripuanã is a clearwater river.

== Course ==
In Mato Grosso to the south of the border with Amazonas the river defines the western boundary of the 227,817-hectare (562,950-acre) Igarapés do Juruena State Park, created in 2002. To the north of the Amazonas border it flows through the 224,291 hectares (554,240 acres) Aripuanã Sustainable Development Reserve, created in 2005.

Further north in Amazonas the Trans-Amazonian Highway (BR-230) crosses the Aripuanã. North of the highway the river flows through the 751,302-hectare (1,856,510-acre) Aripuanã National Forest, a sustainable development unit created in 2016 in the last week before the provisional removal of president Dilma Rousseff. It then flows through the Juma Sustainable Development Reserve before meeting the Madeira.

There are four dams on the river (Dardanelos Dam, Faxinal I and Faxinal II at Aripuanã town, and Juína Dam west of Juína) and a fifth is planned (Prainha Dam on the middle Aripuanã River). These have impacted the environment and caused conflicts with indigenous people.

== See also ==
- List of rivers of Amazonas
- List of rivers of Mato Grosso

== Sources ==
- FLONA do Aripuanã (in Portuguese), ISA: Instituto Socioambiental
- PES Igarapés do Juruena (in Portuguese), ISA: Instituto Socioambiental
- RDS Aripuanã (in Portuguese), ISA: Instituto Socioambiental
