= Juruena National Park =

National park in Brazil

- Parque Nacional do Juruena
- IUCN category II (national park)
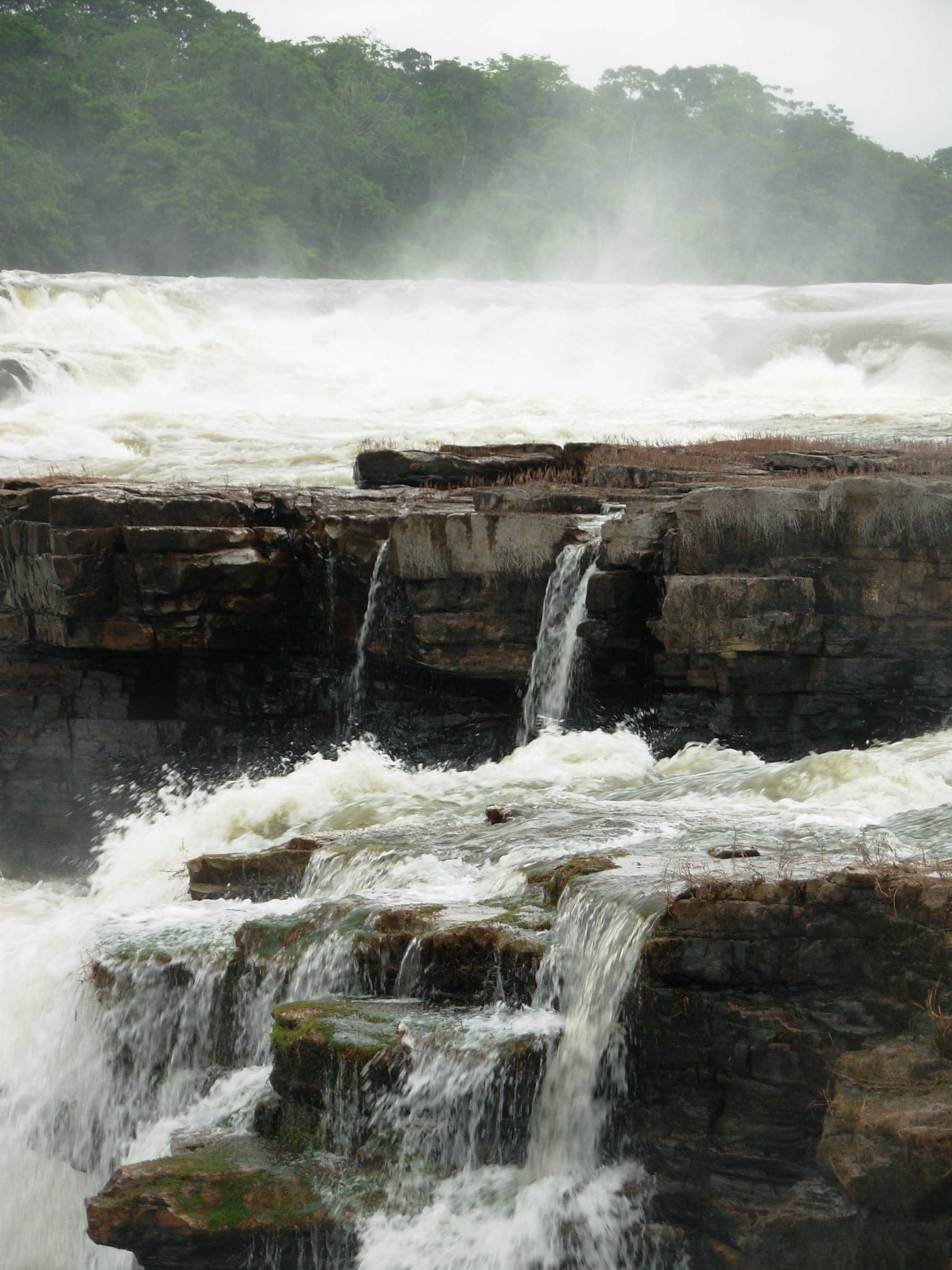
- Waterfall in the national park

- Location within Brazil
- Location: Mato Grosso and Amazonas states, Brazil
- Coordinates: 7.228°S 58.918°W
- Area: 19,000 km^{2} (7,300 sq mi)
- Designation: National park
- Established: 5 June 2006
- Administrator: Chico Mendes Institute for Biodiversity Conservation

Juruena National Park (Portuguese: Parque Nacional do Juruena), declared in 2006, is the third largest national park of Brazil. It is located along the Juruena River, in the north of Mato Grosso state and the south of Amazonas state. It forms part of a corridor of protected areas that is meant to contain agricultural expansion into the Amazon rainforest.

== Location ==
The park covers 1,958,203.56 hectares (4,838,826.4 acres), mostly in the Amazon biome. It is the third largest in Brazil. It contains parts of the municipalities of Apuí and Maués in Amazonas, and Cotriguaçu, Nova Bandeirantes and Apiacás in Mato Grosso. It adjoins the 808,312 hectares (1,997,380 acres) Sucunduri State Park in the municipality of Apuí. The Igarapés do Juruena State Park to the west overlaps by almost 53% with the Juruena National Park.

About 49% of the park is flat plains, 18% gently undulating, 21% undulating, and 10% strongly undulating. 1% is mountainous. Altitudes range from 39 to 457 metres (128 to 1,499 ft) above sea level. The park holds 39 river sub-basins. The largest is that of the São Tomé River, which occupies 23% of the area and has all its sources in the park. The Sucunduri River basin in the north of the park covers 10% of the total area. The rivers are classed as clear water. They are green or olive-green in the dry seasons, muddy in the rainy season. Navigability is poor for vessels of any size due to rocky outcrops, small or large rapids and waterfalls.

== History ==
Juruena National Park was created by decree on 5 June 2006 and is administered by the federal Chico Mendes Institute for Biodiversity Conservation. It is one of the parks created under the Amazon Region Protected Areas Programme (ARPA) launched in 2002.

In 2014 the federal government was considering a proposal to declare the Juruena National Park an area of public utility in preparation for constructing two hydroelectric dams in the site, the São Simão Alto and Salto Augusto Baixo. The planned dams had a forecast capacity of 4,940 MW. The National Council for Energy Policy (CNPE) had two seats for civil society members, but these had not been filled. WWF-Brasil led a campaign against the energy project, which would flood an area of over 40,000 hectares (99,000 acres). In September 2014 the federal government withdrew its proposal. The dams would have flooded parts of the Juruena National Park, Igarapés do Juruena State Park and the Escondido and Apiaká do Pontal indigenous territories in Mato Grosso, and would have affected part of the Sucunduri State Park in Amazonas and other indigenous territories.

== Conservation ==
The park is classed as IUCN protected area category II (national park). The basic objective is to preserve natural ecosystems of great ecological relevance and scenic beauty such as the waterfalls of the Juruena River at Salto Augusto and San Simon, and to support scientific research, environmental education and interpretation, recreation in contact with nature and ecological tourism. The park aims to protect the biological diversity and natural landscapes of the lower Juruena - Teles Pires and upper Tapajós region. It ensures a healthy ecosystem in the crucial Southern Amazon region between the Tapajós and Madeira rivers. The park protects many endangered species including the jaguar, giant otter and harpy eagle.

The park forms part of an ecological corridor, that includes Xingu Indigenous Park in Mato Grosso and Pará, the Terra do Meio Mosaic in Pará, the Juruena National Park in Amazonas and Mato Grosso, the Apuí Mosaic in Amazonas and then the Campos Amazônicos National Park in Amazonas and Roraima. The corridor is intended to contain agricultural expansion into the central Amazon region and deforestation. The conservation unit is supported by the Amazon Region Protected Areas Program.

== Environment ==
Average annual rainfall is 1,000 millimetres (39 in). Temperatures range from 17 to 34 °C (63 to 93 °F) with an average of 27 °C (81 °F).

The region is a transition zone between the Amazon biome and the xeromorphic formations of the Cerrado biome. The park has 22,771 hectares (56,270 acres) of water and 1,934,229 hectares (4,779,580 acres) of different types of vegetation. 53.4% is dense or open rainforest, and 36.35% consists of contact areas or enclaves of rainforest with other formations such as wooded or park savannah. The remaining land holds semi-deciduous forest or disturbed vegetation. Although there is controversy over the classification, the non-forest areas resemble Campinarana formations.

412 bird species have been identified, of which 40 are endemic to the southern Amazon and at least 26 are restricted to the Madeira - Tapajós. Endemic species include bald parrot (Pyrilia aurantiocephala), bare-eyed antbird (Rhegmatorhina gymnops), tooth-billed wren (Odontorchilus cinereus), snow-capped manakin (Lepidothrix nattereri), Gould's toucanet (Selenidera gouldii), dark-winged trumpeter (Psophia viridis) and crimson-bellied parakeet (Pyrrhura perlata). Migratory birds include purple martin (Progne subis), barn swallow (Hirundo rustica), white-throated kingbird (Tyrannus albogularis), fork-tailed flycatcher (Tyrannus savana), and tropical kingbird (Tyrannus melancholicus).

The ashy black titi (Callicebus cinerascens) is endemic. Migratory fish include Boulengerella ocellata, Brachyplatystoma filamentosum, Hydrolycus armatus, Leiarius marmoratus, Pseudoplatystoma species, Prochilodus nigricans, Pseudoplatystoma fasciatum and Tympanopleura atronasus.

== Sources ==
- Creation of a (mega) conservation corridor aims to reduce fundamental conflicts, 26 June 2006
- Daniele Bragança (29 September 2014), "Governo desiste de construir hidrelétrica no Parque do Juruena", O Eco (in Portuguese)
- Full list: PAs supported by ARPA, ARPA
- Juruena-Apuí-Schutzgebiete (PDF) (in German), WWF
- "ONG afirma que Parque Nacional do Juruena corre risco, na Amazônia", portalamazonia.com (in Portuguese), 19 June 2014, archived from the original on 17 August 2016
- Parque Nacional do Juruena (in Portuguese), Chico Mendes Institute for Biodiversity Conservation, archived from the original on 2019-06-07
- PES Igarapés do Juruena (in Portuguese), ISA: Instituto Socioambiental
- PES do Sucunduri (in Portuguese), ISA: Instituto Socioambiental
- Unidade de Conservação: Parque Nacional do Juruena (in Portuguese), MMA: Ministério do Meio Ambiente
