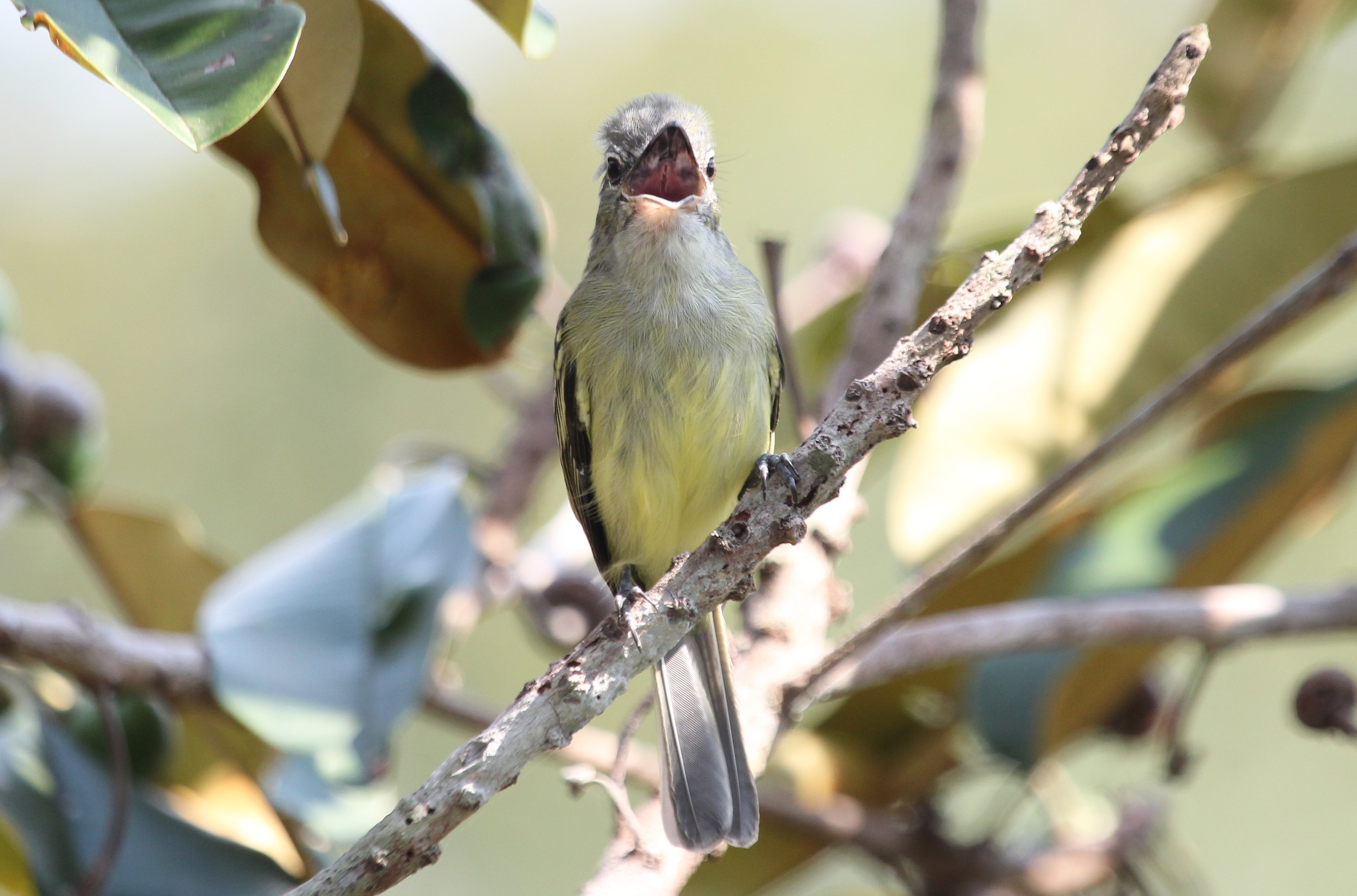

Conservation status
- Least Concern (IUCN 3.1)

Scientific classification
- Kingdom: Animalia
- Phylum: Chordata
- Class: Aves
- Order: Passeriformes
- Family: Tyrannidae
- Genus: Tolmomyias
- Species: T. assimilis

Binomial name
- Tolmomyias assimilis (Pelzeln, 1868)

= Yellow-margined flatbill =

Species of bird

The yellow-margined flatbill or Zimmer's flatbill (Tolmomyias assimilis) is a species of bird in the tyrant flycatcher family Tyrannidae. It is found in every mainland South American country except Argentina, Chile, Paraguay, and Uruguay.

== Taxonomy and systematics ==
The yellow-margined flatbill has a complicated taxonomic history. It was originally described as Rhynchocyclus assimilis. In the early twentieth century it was treated as a subspecies of the yellow-olive flatbill (now T. sulphurescens) but was separated by most authors starting in about 1940. As of 2025 it has eight subspecies. However, what is now the yellow-winged flatbill (T. flavotectus) was previously a ninth subspecies. It was separated starting in 2016 but the process continued until 2024. Confusingly, for a time T. flavotectus was called the yellow-margined flatbill.

The eight subspecies of the yellow-margined flatbill are:

- T. a. neglectus Zimmer, JT, 1939
- T. a. examinatus (Chubb, C, 1920)
- T. a. obscuriceps Zimmer, JT, 1939
- T. a. clarus Zimmer, JT, 1939
- T. a. assimilis (Pelzeln, 1868)
- T. a. sucunduri Whitney, Schunck, MA Rêgo & Silveira, 2013
- T. a. paraensis Zimmer, JT, 1939
- T. a. calamae Zimmer, JT, 1939

The taxonomy of the yellow-margined flatbill is still in flux. Subspecies T. a. sucunduri was originally described as a full species; it and some of the other subspecies may eventually be treated as full species. The Clements taxonomy groups the nominate, T. a. clarus, and T. a. calamae as the "assimilis group" and highlights each of the other subspecies separately.

== Description ==
The yellow-margined flatbill is 13 to 13.5 cm (5.1 to 5.3 in) long and weighs 12 to 17.5 g (0.42 to 0.62 oz). The sexes have the same plumage. Adults of the nominate subspecies T. a. assimilis have a mostly olive-tinged gray head with a thin white broken eye-ring. Their back, rump, and uppertail coverts are olive-green. Their wings are dusky with yellow edges on the greater coverts and remiges that appear as a pale speculum and a faint wing bar on the closed wing. Their tail is dusky. Their throat is pale gray, their breast and flanks pale olive, and their belly pale yellow. Juveniles have less gray on their head than adults with wider but more diffuse ochraceous edges on the wing feathers. All subspecies have an olive to dark brown iris, a wide flat bill with a black maxilla and a pale brownish to horn mandible, and gray legs and feet.

The other subspecies of the yellow-margined flatbill differ from the nominate and each other thus:

- T. a. neglectus: olive crown and dull olive breast
- T. a. examinatus: similar to neglectus with a duller olive breast
- T. a. obscuriceps: olive crown with a very faint gray wash
- T. a. clarus: similar to obscuriceps with more gray in the crown and a brighter yellow belly
- T. a. sucunduri: darker and more lead-gray crown and slightly darker green back than nominate
- T. a. paraensis: olive crown with minimal gray
- T. a. calamae: similar to obscuriceps with a darker crown

== Distribution and habitat ==
The subspecies of the yellow-margined flatbill are found thus:

- T. a. neglectus: from Vichada to Vaupés departments in eastern Colombia into southwestern Venezuela's Amazonas and northern Bolívar states and to the Negro River in northwestern Brazil
- T. a. examinatus: from eastern and southern Bolívar in Venezuela east through the Guianas and northeastern Brazil north of the Amazon to the Atlantic in Pará and Amapá
- T. a. obscuriceps: from Meta Department in central Colombia south through eastern Ecuador into northeastern Peru's Department of Loreto north of the Amazon
- T. a. clarus: eastern Peru between the Marañón River in Amazonas Department and northern Puno Department
- T. a. assimilis: central Brazil from central Amazonas state east to the Tapajós River in western Pará
- T. a. sucunduri: central Amazonian Brazil from the Canumã River and its headwater Sucunduri River east to the lower Tapajós
- T. a. paraensis: northeastern Brazil from eastern Pará and northwestern Maranhão states south to northern Mato Grosso
- T. a. calamae: southeastern Amazonas, Rondônia, and northern Mato Grosso states in southwestern Brazil and into northern Bolivia

The yellow-margined flatbill inhabits mature humid forest of several types including terra firme, várzea, secondary forest, and plantations. It occurs on the slopes of tepuis in the area where Venezuela, Guyana, and Brazil meet. It typically is found from the forest's mid-story to the subcanopy but can occur lower at the edges. In elevation it ranges from sea level to above 1,000 m (3,300 ft) in Brazil. Elsewhere it reaches 600 m (2,000 ft) in Colombia, 750 m (2,500 ft) in Ecuador, 1,000 m (3,300 ft) and locally to 1,300 m (4,300 ft) in Peru, and 1,200 m (3,900 ft) in Venezuela.

== Behavior ==
=== Movement ===
The yellow-margined flatbill is a year-round resident.

=== Feeding ===
The yellow-margined flatbill primarily feeds on arthropods and also includes small fruits in its diet. It typically forages singly or in pairs and often joins mixed-species feeding flocks. It feeds mostly from the forest's mid-story up to the subcanopy but will go lower at the edges. It captures prey mostly with short upward sallies from a perch to grab or hover-glean it from leaves; less often it captures prey in mid-air.

=== Breeding ===
Nothing is known about the yellow-margined flatbill's breeding biology.

=== Vocalization ===
The yellow-margined flatbill's vocalizations vary geographically. In the Guianas it makes a "series of typically 2‒5 drawn-out extremely nasal, almost screaming notes". In Ecuador it sings "a leisurely series of 3 whistled notes, each slightly higher-pitched and shriller, e.g. weeeuw...weeeu...weee?" In much of Peru it makes a similar "raspy, rising series of short, rising or rising-falling whistles" zhree zhrfeee ZHREEE" In Venezuela it "sings through its nose...a [series] of notes, very nasal and buzzy, given in leisurely but emphatic manner, znuu...znee, znuuu-znuuu, varied to znuu...znuu...znuuu, znuuu-PIK!" Compared to the "pure and overslurred" notes in Ecuador and Peru, "[i]n the eastern Amazonian region [Brazil], notes are very different and predominantly downslurred, and a Song[sic] phrase may end with a series of short tsik! notes". The species typically sings from a well-hidden perch high in the forest, and mostly in the morning and late afternoon.

== Status ==
The IUCN has assessed the yellow-margined flatbill as being of Least Concern. It has a very large range; its population size is not known and is believed to be decreasing. No immediate threats have been identified. It is considered fairly common in Colombia and Peru and uncommon to fairly common in Venezuela. It occurs in many protected areas both public and private, and "[m]uch of its habitat remains in relatively pristine condition within its relatively large range".
