= Flatbill =

Flatbill refers to the members of two genera of the family Tyrannidae:

- Ramphotrigon
- Rhynchocyclus

In recent years it has also frequently been used for the members of another genus in the family Tyrannidae:

- Tolmomyias
