= Campos de Manicoré Environmental Protection Area =

- Área de Proteção Ambiental dos Campos de Manicoré
- IUCN category V (protected landscape/seascape)
- Location within Brazil
- Nearest city: Manicoré, Amazonas
- Coordinates: 7.103°S 61.281°W
- Designation: Environmental protection area

The Campos de Manicoré Environmental Protection Area (Portuguese: Área de Proteção Ambiental dos Campos de Manicoré) is an environmental protection area (APA) in the state of Amazonas, Brazil.

== Location ==
The Campos de Manicoré Environmental Protection Area (APA) is in the municipality of Manicoré, Amazonas. It has an area of 151,993 hectares (375,580 acres). It is some distance to the north of the stretch of the Trans-Amazonian Highway (BR-230) between Humaitá and Apuí in the region between the Madeira River and the Aripuanã River. The Manicoré River defines the east boundary of the APA.

== History ==
The Campos de Manicoré Environmental Protection Area was created by presidential decree on 11 April 2016. The purpose was to protect biological diversity and control the process of occupying the region, in particular along the road being built between Santo Antônio de Matupi on BR-230 and the seat of the municipality of Manicoré on the Madeira River. Santo Antônio do Matupí is a major centre of logging in the region.

The APA was one of five conservation units created in last week before the provisional removal of president Dilma Rousseff, totalling 2,600,000 hectares (6,400,000 acres), all in the south of Amazonas state. These were the fully protected Manicoré Biological Reserve with 359,063 hectares (887,260 acres) and Acari National Park with 896,407 hectares (2,215,070 acres), and the sustainable use Campos de Manicoré Environmental Protection Area with 151,993 hectares (375,580 acres), Aripuanã National Forest with 751,295 hectares (1,856,490 acres) and Urupadi National Forest with 537,228 hectares (1,327,520 acres). The same package expanded the Amaná National Forest by 141,000 hectares (350,000 acres).

With these units the Dilma government had created about 3,400,000 hectares (8,400,000 acres) of new protected areas during her administration, compared to about 26,800,000 hectares (66,000,000 acres) by her predecessor Luiz Inácio Lula da Silva. Her administration had also reduced the area of seven protected areas in the Amazon to allow for construction of dams on the Tapajós.

== Sources ==
- APA dos Campos de Manicoré (in Portuguese), ISA: Instituto Socioambiental
- Brasil ganha cinco novas áreas protegidas no sul do Amazonas (in Portuguese), WWF Brasil, 16 May 2016
- "No apagar das luzes, governo Dilma cria 5 unidades de conservação", ((o))eco (in Portuguese), 12 May 2016
- "Num de seus últimos atos, Dilma cria APA, Reserva e amplia floresta no Amazonas", A Critica (in Portuguese), Rede Calderaro de Comunicação, 12 April 2016, archived from the original on 2016-05-17
- PARNA do Acari (in Portuguese), ISA: Instituto Socioambiental
