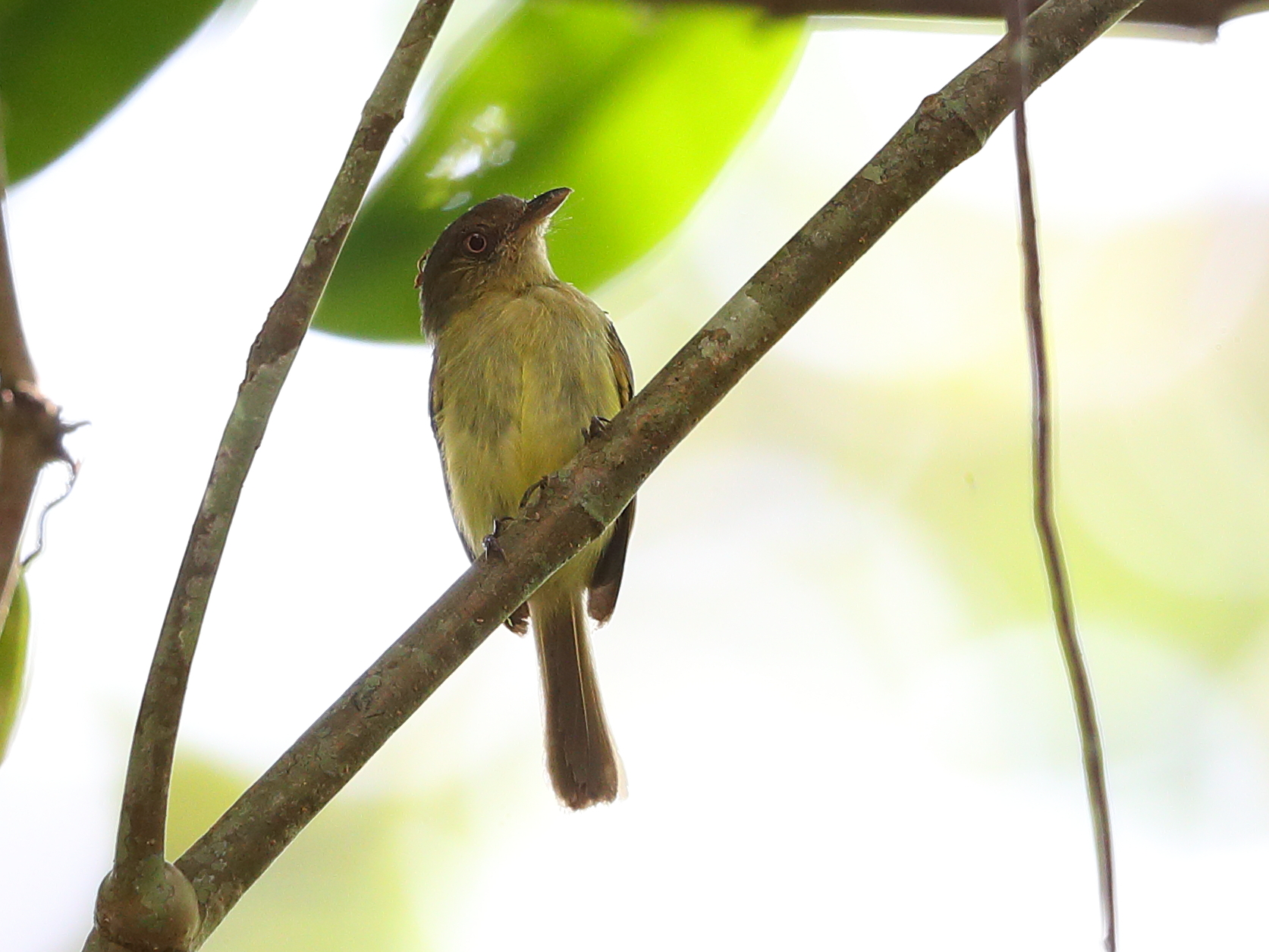

Conservation status
- Least Concern (IUCN 3.1)

Scientific classification
- Kingdom: Animalia
- Phylum: Chordata
- Class: Aves
- Order: Passeriformes
- Family: Tyrannidae
- Genus: Tolmomyias
- Species: T. traylori

Binomial name
- Tolmomyias traylori Schulenberg & Parker, 1997

= Orange-eyed flatbill =

Species of bird

The orange-eyed flatbill or orange-eyed flycatcher (Tolmomyias traylori) is a species of bird in the family Tyrannidae, the tyrant flycatchers. It is found in Colombia, Ecuador, and Peru.

== Taxonomy and systematics ==
Though the first specimens of the orange-eyed flatbill were collected in the 1860s it was not recognized as a distinct species until the 1980s and then formally described in 1997. Its specific epithet honors Melvin Alvah Traylor Jr. "in recognition of his outstanding contributions to ornithology" and who "long ago [had] singled out as unusual the Field Museum's two specimens of the species".

The orange-eyed flatbill is monotypic.

== Description ==
The orange-eyed flatbill is about 13.5 cm (5.3 in) long; one male weighed 11.5 g (0.41 oz). The sexes have the same plumage. Adults have a cinnamon forecrown with olive-gray tips on the feathers. They have an olive-gray crown, buff lores, a pale eye-ring, and cinnamon-buff ear coverts. Their nape, back, rump, and uppertail coverts are pale olive-green. Their wings are dusky with greenish yellow edges on the greater coverts that form two wing bars and thin olive-green edges on the flight feather edges, some of which also have a cream far outer edge. Their tail is dusky with olive-green outer webs on most of the feathers. Their throat and chin are whitish buff, their upper breast ochraceous buff with duller sides, their lower breast and flanks pale yellow, their belly bright yellow, and their undertail coverts cream. They have a pale orangish brown or yellowish mauve iris, a wide flat bill with a black maxilla and a pale pinkish brown mandible, and bluish gray legs and feet.

== Distribution and habitat ==
The orange-eyed flatbill is a bird of the far western Amazon Basin. It is found from Putumayo Department in southern Colombia south through eastern Ecuador into northern Peru's Amazonas and Loreto departments. In addition, there are sight records in extreme southeastern Colombia's Amazonas Department near the Amazon River and eBird records further north in Colombia. The species' range might extend further east into far western Brazil. It is known along the Napo River in Ecuador and north of the Amazon and its tributaries in Colombia. It apparently replaces the yellow-olive flatbill (T. sulphurescens) north of the Amazon. The species inhabits riverside forest, especially seasonally flooded várzea. In Peru it is also known locally on older river islands. It primarily occurs from the forest's mid-story to its canopy. In elevation it reaches 300 m (1,000 ft) in Colombia and Ecuador; its maximum elevation in Peru isn't known.

== Behavior ==
=== Movement ===
The orange-eyed flatbill is a year-round resident.

=== Feeding ===
The orange-eyed flatbill primarily feeds on insects, though details are lacking. It typically forages singly or in pairs and regularly joins mixed-species feeding flocks. It usually captures prey with outward or upward sallies to snatch it from leaves.

=== Breeding ===
The orange-eyed flatbill's breeding biology is essentially unknown. Its season includes June, during which juveniles being tended by adults were observed. Its nest is assumed to be similar to the hanging bag with an entrance tube made by other Tolmomyias flatbills.

=== Vocalization ===
The orange-eyed flatbill is best separated from other flatbills by its voice. One description of its song is "a rising series of short, rising-falling, raspy whistled notes: zreep zreeeep ZREEEP, final note often becoming clearer and more squeaky" and its call is "a rising-falling raspy whistle followed by a low chatter: ZREEE'chirr'rr". Another description of the song is "a series of up to 5-7 well-enunciated zhreee notes" and of the call a " two-parted and buzzy wheeeeezzz-birrt or psi-trrrrrrrr.

== Status ==
The IUCN has assessed the orange-eyed flatbill as being of Least Concern. It has a large range; its population size is not known and is believed to be decreasing. No immediate threats have been identified. It is considered rare and local in Colombia and Ecuador and "poorly known" in Peru. "Human activity has little short-term direct effect on the Orange-eyed Flatbill, other than the local effects of habitat destruction."
