= Manicoré Biological Reserve =

- Reserva Biológica do Manicoré
- IUCN category Ia (strict nature reserve)
- Location within Brazil
- Nearest city: Manicoré, Amazonas
- Coordinates: 6°58′08″S 60°58′26″W
- Area: 359,137.55 hectares (887,448.2 acres)
- Designation: Biological reserve
- Created: 11 May 2016
- Administrator: Chico Mendes Institute for Biodiversity Conservation

The Manicoré Biological Reserve (Portuguese: Reserva Biológica do Manicoré) is a biological reserve in the state of Amazonas, Brazil. It fully protects an intact area of the Amazon rainforest that is rich in biodiversity, and serves as part of a shield against the advance of the arc of deforestation.

== Location ==
The Manicoré Biological Reserve is the municipalities of Manicoré (54.92%) and Novo Aripuanã (45.08%) in the state of Amazonas. It is north of the Trans-Amazonian Highway (BR-230). It is bounded by the Campos de Manicoré Environmental Protection Area (APA) to the west and by the Aripuanã National Forest to the south and east. Both of these units were created at the same time as the Manicoré Biological Reserve. It lies to the west of the Aripuanã River, a tributary of the Madeira River. The Madeira flows some distance to the west of the reserve. The Manicoré River forms part of the boundary with the Campos de Manicoré APA, then flows north through the Manicoré Biological Reserve. It has an area of 359,137.55 hectares (887,448.2 acres).

== Environment ==
The reserve is in the Amazon biome. Vegetation is mainly dense rainforest with some pioneer formations, and has not suffered as much deforestation as other areas of the Amazon. The reserve holds a wide range of palm tree species, and has endangered tree species such as the Bertholletia excelsa, Amburana cearensis var. Acreana, Swietenia macrophylla and Aniba rosaeodora. The region has a variety of environments and diverse fauna, although there have been few studies. The Madeira River basin is estimated to harbour about 800 species of birds, and is an area with many primates including endemic species.

== History ==
The Manicoré Biological Reserve was created by presidential decree on 11 May 2016. It is administered by the Chico Mendes Institute for Biodiversity Conservation (ICMBio). The reserve was created to protect the biological diversity of the Manicoré, Manicorezinho and Jatuarana rivers, their tributaries and the associated natural and physical landscapes, with the purpose of sustaining ecosystem services and contributing to the environmental stability of the region. The soils are acidic and low fertility, so unsuitable for agriculture or grazing, but the region has been feeling growing pressure from loggers, ranchers and soybean farmers since 2005. The reserve is part of a shield designed to protect the heart of the Amazon forest from the advance of deforestation.

The reserve is one of five conservation units created in the last week before the provisional removal of president Dilma Rousseff, totalling 2,600,000 hectares (6,400,000 acres), all in the south of Amazonas state. These were the fully protected Manicoré Biological Reserve with 359,063 hectares (887,260 acres) and Acari National Park with 896,407 hectares (2,215,070 acres), and the sustainable use Campos de Manicoré Environmental Protection Area with 151,993 hectares (375,580 acres), Aripuanã National Forest with 751,295 hectares (1,856,490 acres) and Urupadi National Forest with 537,228 hectares (1,327,520 acres). The same package expanded the Amaná National Forest by 141,000 hectares (350,000 acres).

With these units the Dilma government had created about 3,400,000 hectares (8,400,000 acres) of new protected areas during her administration, compared to about 26,800,000 hectares (66,000,000 acres) by her predecessor Luiz Inácio Lula da Silva. Her administration had also reduced the area of seven protected areas in the Amazon to allow for construction of dams on the Tapajós.

== Sources ==
- "No apagar das luzes, governo Dilma cria 5 unidades de conservação", ((o))eco (in Portuguese), 12 May 2016
- PARNA do Acari (in Portuguese), ISA: Instituto Socioambiental
- Rebio do Manicoré (in Portuguese), Chico Mendes Institute for Biodiversity Conservation
- REBIO do Manicoré (in Portuguese), ISA: Instituto Socioambiental
