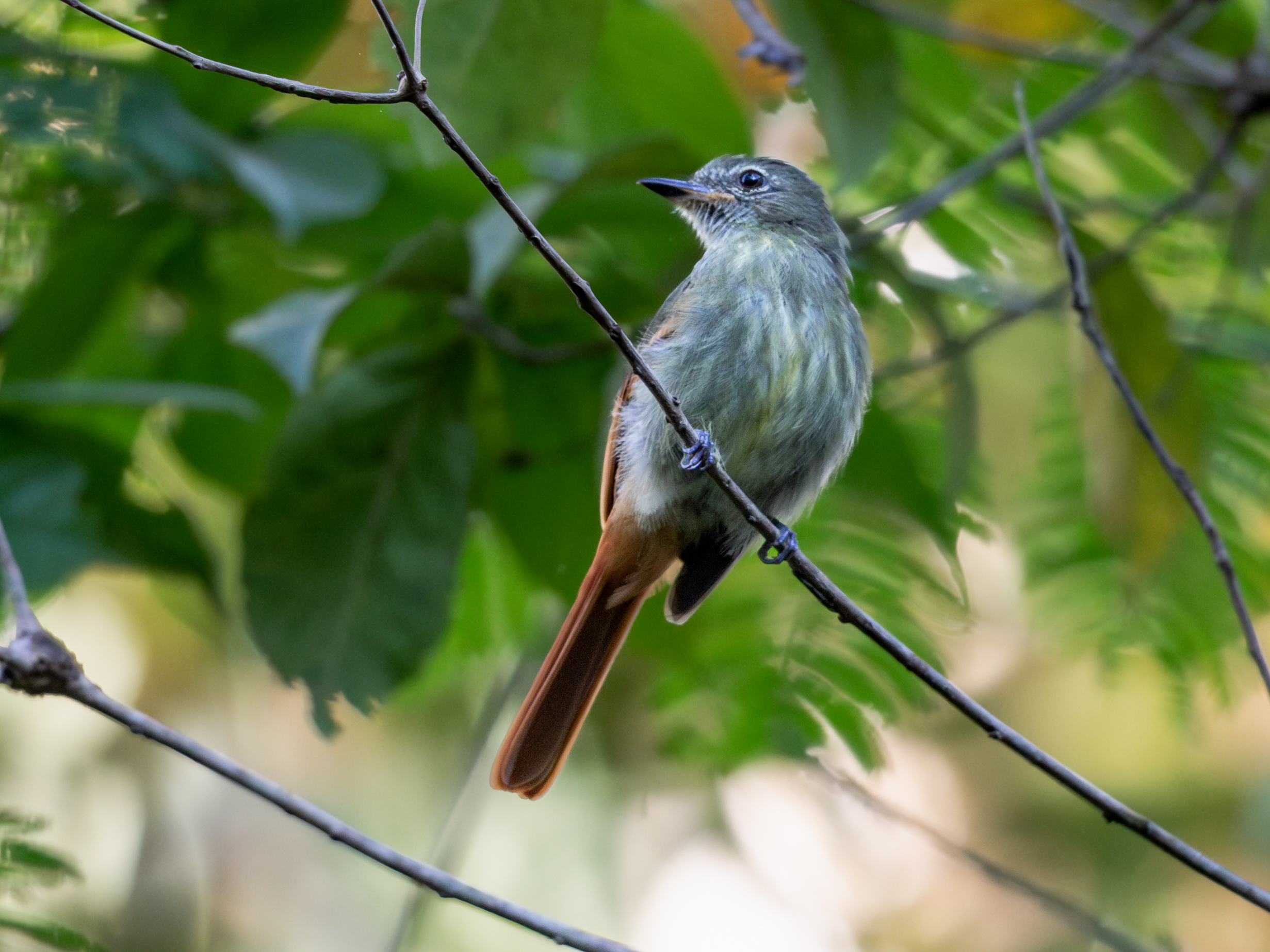

Conservation status
- Least Concern (IUCN 3.1)

Scientific classification
- Kingdom: Animalia
- Phylum: Chordata
- Class: Aves
- Order: Passeriformes
- Family: Tyrannidae
- Genus: Ramphotrigon
- Species: R. ruficauda

Binomial name
- Ramphotrigon ruficauda (Spix, 1825)

= Rufous-tailed flatbill =

Species of bird

The rufous-tailed flatbill (Ramphotrigon ruficauda) is a species of bird in the family Tyrannidae, the tyrant flycatchers. It is found in every mainland South American country except Argentina, Chile, Paraguay, and Uruguay.

== Taxonomy and systematics ==
The rufous-tailed flatbill was originally described as Platyrhynchus ruficauda.

The genus Ramphotrigon was long thought to be closely related to genera Tolmomyias and Rhynchocyclus, whose members also have wide bills. However, studies published in the early 2000s found that it is more closely related to genus Myiarchus.

The rufous-tailed flatbill is monotypic.

== Description ==
The rufous-tailed flatbill is 15 to 16 cm (5.9 to 6.3 in) long and weighs about 17 to 26 g (0.60 to 0.92 oz). The sexes have the same plumage. Adults have an olive-green crown, a faint pale line behind the lores, and a faint pale eye-ring on an otherwise dark olive-green face. Their upperparts are mostly dark olive-green with bright rufous uppertail coverts. Their wings are mostly blackish with wide bright rufous edges on the flight feathers and tips on the coverts; the latter show as two wing bars. Their tail is bright rufous. Their throat is grayish, their breast mixed olive-green and yellow, their belly olive-green with a yellow center, and their undertail coverts rufous. They have a dark brown iris, a flat black bill with a pale cream or pink base to the mandible, and bluish gray or gray legs and feet.

== Distribution and habitat ==
The rufous-tailed flatbill is a bird of the Amazon Basin and the Guiana Shield. Its range extends from southeastern Colombia south through eastern Ecuador and eastern Peru into northwestern Bolivia. From that area it extends east across southern and eastern Venezuela, the Guianas, and essentially all of Amazonian Brazil. It inhabits humid evergreen forest both várzea and terra firme and also, in Brazil, wooded savanna. In elevation in Brazil it ranges from sea level to 600 m (2,000 ft). It reaches 700 m (2,300 ft) in Colombia, 250 m (800 ft) in Ecuador, 700 m (2,300 ft) in Peru, and 500 m (1,600 ft) in Venezuela.

== Behavior ==
=== Movement ===
The rufous-tailed flatbill is a year-round resident.

=== Feeding ===
The rufous-tailed flatbill feeds mostly on insects and some berries, though details are lacking. It typically feeds in the forest's mid-story, usually singly or in pairs, and seldom joins mixed-species feeding flocks. It captures most prey with sallies from a perch to foliage or twigs and usually returns to a different perch.

=== Breeding ===
The rufous-tailed flatbill's breeding season has not been defined but includes August in Peru and October in Suriname. The one known nest was in a cavity in a partially rotted stump. It had a base of small twigs with softer plant material on top. It contained crimson-spotted creamy eggs that hatched 14 days after discovery. The full incubation period, time to fledging, and details of parental care are not known.

=== Vocalization ===
The rufous-tailed flatbill's dawn song is "a low mewing whistle ending with a higher hiccup: meeoooOOoo'WEEpur!". Its day vocalization, which might be either a call or song, is "a low, rising-falling or slightly quavering, mewing whistle: meeooo, or with terminal emphasis: meeooo'OO", also described as a "high, slow, mournful weaeaea-wur".

== Status ==
The IUCN has assessed the rufous-tailed flatbill as being of Least Concern. It has an extremely large range; its population size is not known and is believed to be decreasing. No immediate threats have been identified. It is considered rare in Colombia, "rare and local" in Ecuador, "uncommon but locally fairly common" in Peru, "uncommon to fairly common" in Venezuela, and fairly common in Brazil. "Human activity has little direct effect on the Rufous-tailed Flatbill, other than the local effects of habitat destruction."
