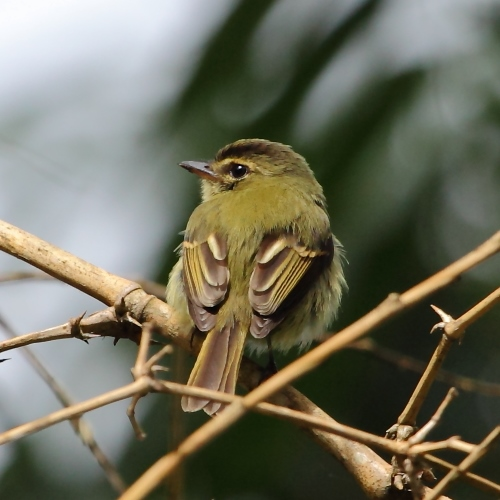
- At Intervales State Park, São Paulo State, Brazil

Conservation status
- Least Concern (IUCN 3.1)

Scientific classification
- Kingdom: Animalia
- Phylum: Chordata
- Class: Aves
- Order: Passeriformes
- Family: Tyrannidae
- Genus: Ramphotrigon
- Species: R. megacephalum

Binomial name
- Ramphotrigon megacephalum (Swainson, 1835)

Synonyms
- See text

= Large-headed flatbill =

Species of bird

The large-headed flatbill (Ramphotrigon megacephalum), also known as the bamboo flatbill, is a species of bird in the family Tyrannidae, the tyrant flycatchers. It is found in Argentina, Bolivia, Brazil, Colombia, Ecuador, Guyana, Paraguay, Peru, Suriname, and Venezuela.

== Taxonomy and systematics ==
The large-headed flatbill was formally first described as an illustration, though not in text, as the "great-headed flycatcher", Tyrannula megacephala. Later it was placed in genus Tolmomyias. It has also had the binomial Ramphotrigon megacephala and some authors have called it the "bamboo Flatbill".

The large-headed flatbill has these four subspecies:

- R. m. pectorale Zimmer, JT & Phelps, WH, 1947
- R. m. venezuelense Phelps, WH & Gilliard, 1941
- R. m. bolivianum Zimmer, JT, 1939
- R. m. megacephalum (Swainson, 1835)

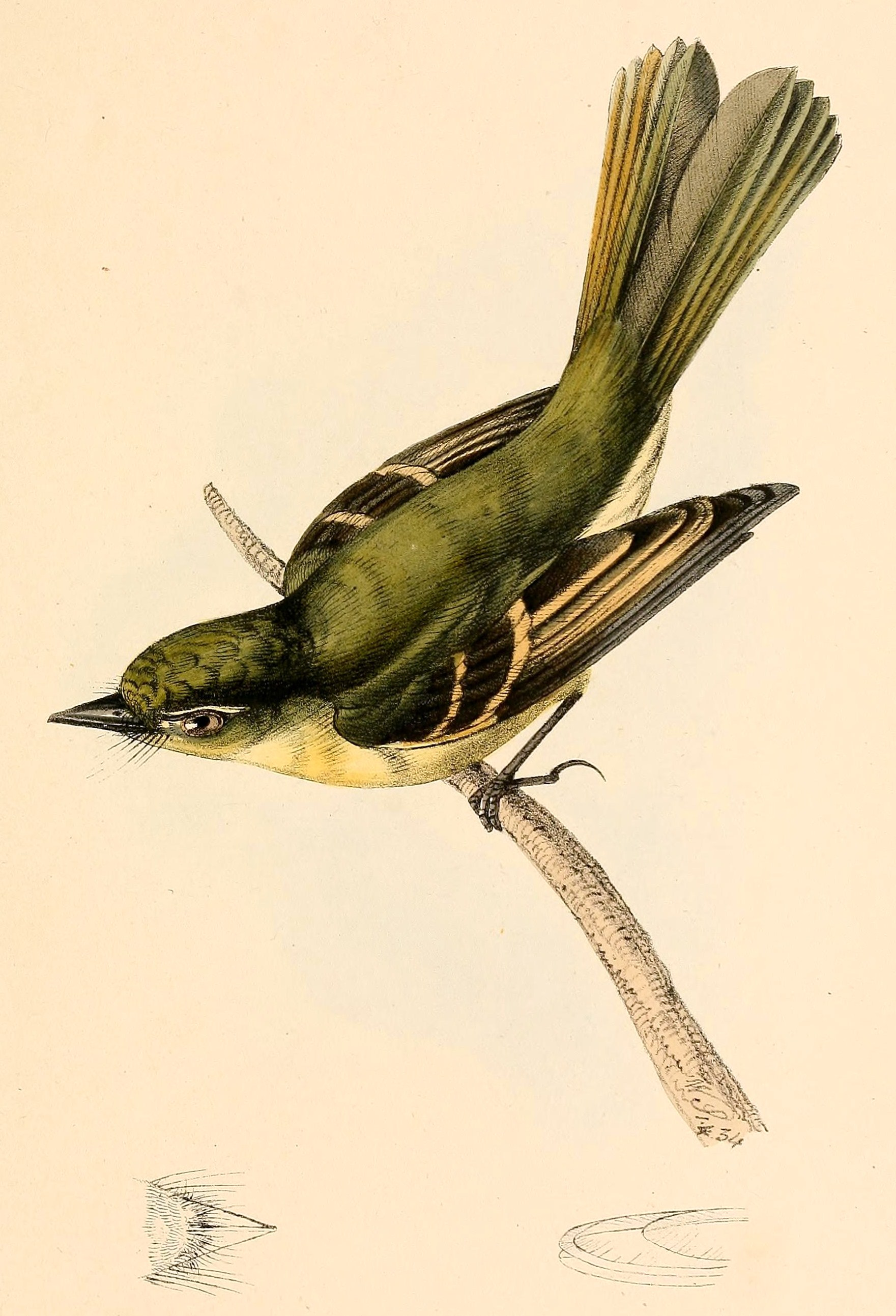
Ramphotrigon megacephalum illustration by Swainson, 1841

== Description ==
The large-headed flatbill is 12.5 to 13.2 cm (4.9 to 5.2 in) long and weighs 13 to 15 g (0.46 to 0.53 oz). The sexes have the same plumage. Adults of the nominate subspecies R. m. megacephalum have a dark olive crown, dusky lores, a whitish to yellowish streak behind the lores, and a whitish to yellowish eye-ring on an otherwise dark olive face. Their upperparts are dark olive. Their wings are mostly dusky with yellow-olive edges on the flight feathers and ochraceous tips on the coverts; the latter show as two wing bars. Their tail is dusky with yellow-olive edges on the feathers. Their throat is whitish to yellowish, their breast grayish olive with faint yellowish streaks, and their belly yellow.

Subspecies R. m. pectorale has a browner breast and more extensive yellow on the belly than the nominate. R. m. venezuelense is darker than the nominate and has cinnamon edges on the wing feathers. R. m. bolivianum has a dusky greenish crown and a browner breast and duller yellow belly than the nominate. All subspecies have a brown iris, a flat black bill with a dull pinkish base to the mandible, and gray legs and feet.

== Distribution and habitat ==
The large-headed flatbill has a highly disjunct distribution; each subspecies is separate from all of the others. They are found thus:

- R. m. venezuelense is the northernmost. It is found discontinuously in Venezuela, in western Trujillo, western Apure, western Barinas, northeastern Yaracuy and in the coastal range in northern Aragua. Its range extends west slightly into northern Colombia, and records in Guyana and Suriname are believed to be this subspecies.
- R. m. pectorale also occurs in Venezuela, in an isolated population in southern Amazonas. Its main range is along the eastern side of the Colombian Andes and across the south-central part of the country, locally on the east side of the Andes in Ecuador, slightly into far northwestern Brazil, and possibly into extreme northern Peru.
- R. m. bolivianum is found in eastern Peru from Ucayali Department south into northern Puno Department, east into Brazil as far as Pará and Mato Grosso, and south into northern Bolivia to northern Cochabamba and Santa Cruz departments.
- R. m. megacephalum is found from Espírito Santo and eastern Minas Gerais in southeastern Brazil southwest into southeastern Paraguay and northeastern Argentina's Misiones Province.

The large-headed flatbill inhabits seasonally flooded várzea and igapó forest where it where it almost exclusively is found in and near stands of native bamboo. In northern Venezuela it also occurs in plantations of introduced Asian bamboo. In elevation it reaches 600 m (2,000 ft) in northern Venezuela and about 540 m (1,800 ft) in Amazonas. It reaches 500 m (1,600 ft) in Colombia and 1,200 m (3,900 ft) in Peru. In Ecuador it is found between 300 and 1,300 m (1,000 and 4,300 ft).

== Behavior ==
=== Movement ===
The large-headed flatbill is believed to be a year-round resident.

=== Feeding ===
The large-headed flatbill feeds on insects. It typically feeds singly but occasionally joins mixed-species feeding flocks. It forages from the forest's understory to its mid-story, perching for long periods while scanning for prey. It usually captures insects from vegetation and branches while briefly hovering after a sally from the perch. It occasionally captures them in mid-air.

=== Breeding ===
The large-headed flatbill's breeding season has not been fully defined but includes November in Peru and southeastern Brazil. It builds a bulky nest of plant material in a tree or bamboo cavity. The usual clutch is two eggs. The incubation period, time to fledging, and details of parental care are not known.

=== Vocalization ===
The large-headed flatbill's dawn song is "a continuous, rapidly uttered series of tee-tu-twit or whu hu-hoowhip whistles" and its call "a soft mournful wheé-whoo (or "bam-boo") whistle.

== Status ==
The IUCN has assessed the large-headed flatbill as being of Least Concern. It has a very large range; its population size is not known and is believed to be decreasing. No immediate threats have been identified. It is considered "uncommon and local" in Venezuela, "rare" in Colombia, "uncommon and local" in Ecuador, and "fairly common" in Peru and Brazil. "Much of its habitat remains in relatively pristine condition within its relatively large range. Occurs in many national parks and other protected areas."
