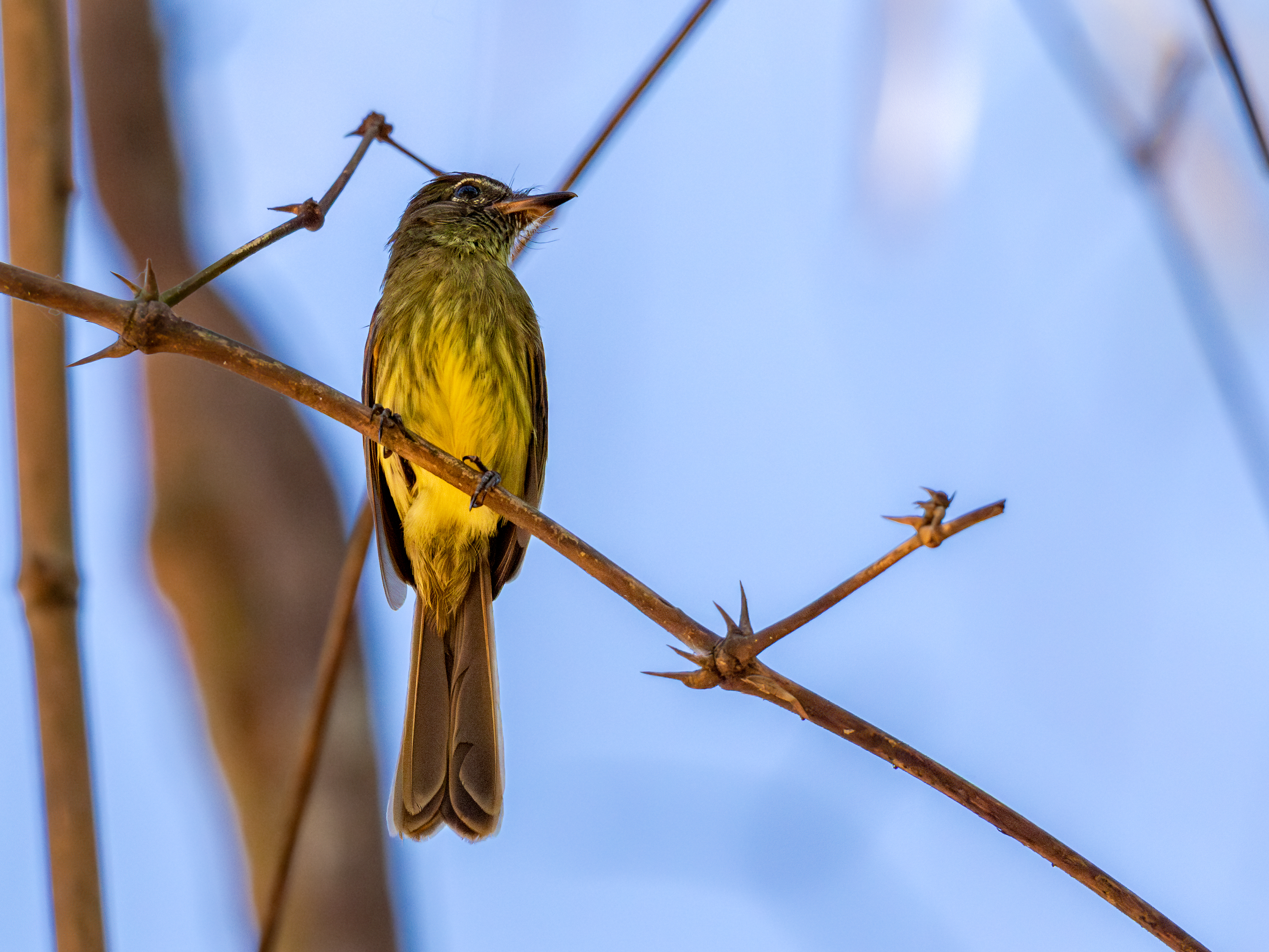

Conservation status
- Least Concern (IUCN 3.1)

Scientific classification
- Kingdom: Animalia
- Phylum: Chordata
- Class: Aves
- Order: Passeriformes
- Family: Tyrannidae
- Genus: Ramphotrigon
- Species: R. fuscicauda

Binomial name
- Ramphotrigon fuscicauda Chapman, 1925

= Dusky-tailed flatbill =

Species of bird

The dusky-tailed flatbill (Ramphotrigon fuscicauda) is a species of bird in the family Tyrannidae, the tyrant flycatchers. It is found in Bolivia, Brazil, Colombia, Ecuador, and Peru.

== Taxonomy and systematics ==
The genus Ramphotrigon was long thought to be closely related to genera Tolmomyias and Rhynchocyclus, whose members also have wide bills. However, studies published in the early 2000s found that it is more closely related to genus Myiarchus.

The dusky-tailed flatbill is monotypic.

== Description ==
The dusky-tailed flatbill is 15.5 to 16.5 cm (6.1 to 6.5 in) long and weighs about 16.5 to 20.5 g (0.58 to 0.72 oz). The sexes have the same plumage. Adults have a dark olive crown, grayish lores, and a thin yellow-green line behind the lores and under the eye on an otherwise dark olive face. Their upperparts are mostly dark olive with slightly lighter uppertail coverts. Their wings are mostly fuscous-black with thin buffy olive edges on the primaries and old gold edges on the secondaries and tertials. Their wing coverts have wide rufous brown or cinnamon edges that show as two wing bars. Their tail is brownish fuscous-black with thin buffy citrine edges on the feathers. Their throat and upper breast are olive green with yellow streaks, their lower breast and sides yellow with olive-green streaks, their belly olive-green with a citron yellow center, and their undertail coverts citron yellow. They have a dark brown iris, a flat black bill with a pinkish base to the mandible, and gray or dark gray legs and feet.

== Distribution and habitat ==
The dusky-tailed flatbill has a disjunct distribution. One very small population is found east of the Andes from extreme southwestern Colombia south into Ecuador as far as Napo Province and possibly slightly beyond. Its principal range encompasses southeastern Peru, northwestern Bolivia, and extreme western Brazil's Acre state. There are also scattered records further east in Brazil.

The dusky-tailed flatbill inhabits humid evergreen forest where it primarily is found in thickets of bamboo, especially that of genus Guadua. It also occurs away from bamboo in vine-heavy thickets. In elevation it is found between 250 and 750 m (800 and 2,500 ft) in Ecuador and reaches 300 m (1,000 ft) in Colombia, 1,050 m (3,400 ft) in Peru, and 600 m (2,000 ft) in Brazil.

== Behavior ==
=== Movement ===
The dusky-tailed flatbill is a year-round resident.

=== Feeding ===
The dusky-tailed flatbill feeds mostly on insects, though details are lacking. It typically feeds in the forest's mid-story, usually singly or in pairs, and seldom joins mixed-species feeding flocks. It captures most prey with sallies from a perch to foliage or twigs.

=== Breeding ===
The dusky-tailed flatbill's breeding season has not been defined but includes August in Peru. Its nest is in a cavity, often in a rotten tree or branch, and is made from plant fibers, leaves, and mammal hair. The clutch is thought to be two or three eggs that are whitish with brownish flecks. The incubation period, time to fledging, and details of parental care are not known.

=== Vocalization ===
The dusky-tailed flatbill's dawn song is "a descending mellow whistle followed by a musical hiccup PEEWW'wichwee, in which the terminal phrase may vary, e.g. PEEWW'weeher". Its calls include "a mellow whistle followed by a decelerating, descending musical chatter: PEEEWWW trrr'PEER-peer-pur" and "a mellow falling-rising whistle: PEEeer'wee?".

== Status ==
The IUCN has assessed the dusky-tailed flatbill as being of Least Concern. It has a large range; its population size is not known and is believed to be decreasing. No immediate threats have been identified. It is considered uncommon and local in Colombia, very rare and local in Ecuador, and uncommon in Peru and Brazil. "Human activity has little direct effect on Dusky-tailed Flatbill, other than the local effects of habitat destruction."
