= Camaiú River =

River in Brazil

Camaiú River Rio Camaiú
- Location within Brazil

Location
- Country: Brazil

Physical characteristics
- Source
  - location: Amazonas state
- Mouth
  - location: Sucunduri River
  - coordinates: 5.786418°S 59.587668°W

Basin features
- River system: Sucunduri River

Camaiú River is a tributary of the Sucunduri River in the Amazonas state in north-western Brazil.

The river flows through the 896,411 hectares (2,215,080 acres) Acari National Park created by president Dilma Rousseff in 2016 in the last week before her provisional removal from office.

== See also ==
- List of rivers of Amazonas
