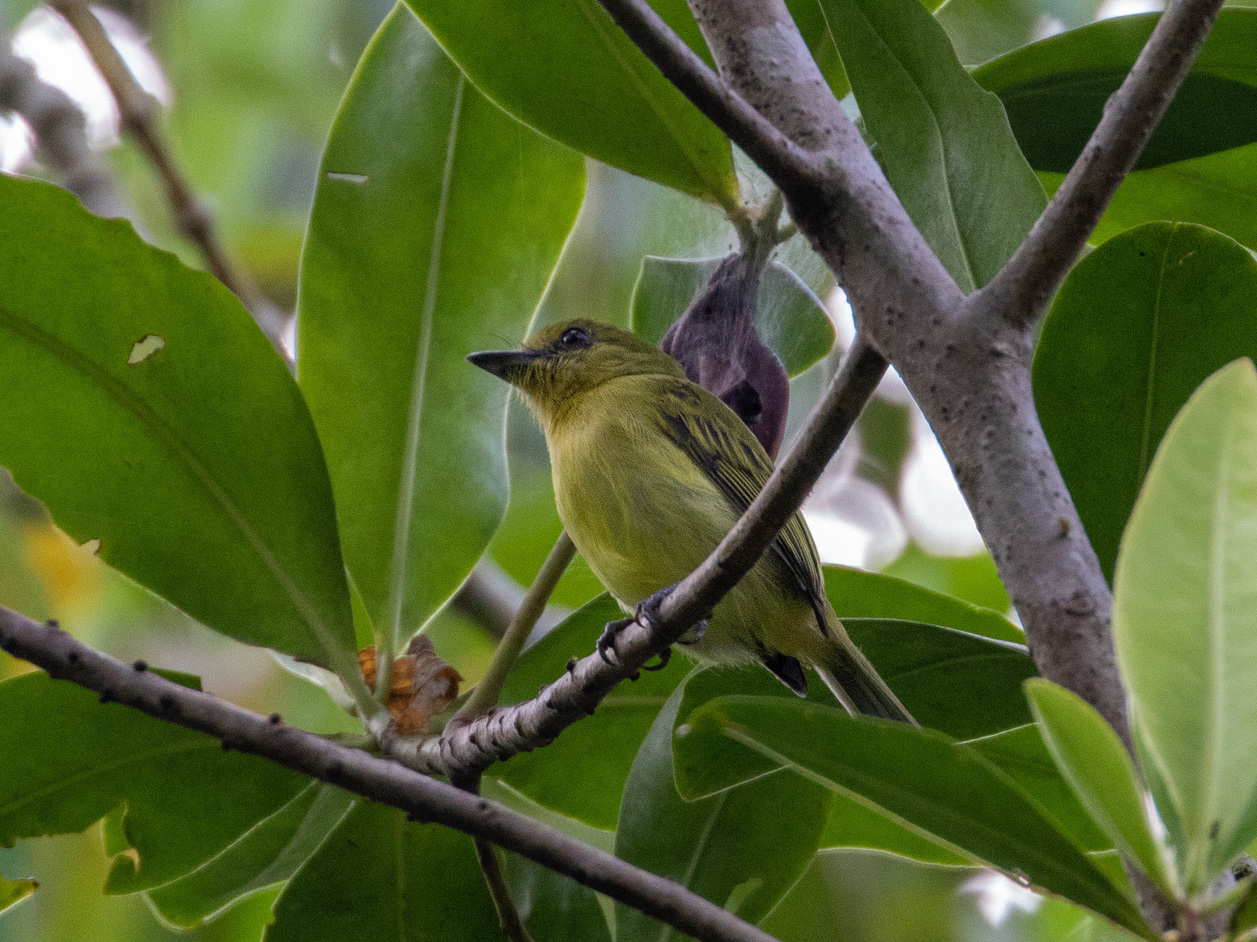

Conservation status
- Least Concern (IUCN 3.1)

Scientific classification
- Kingdom: Animalia
- Phylum: Chordata
- Class: Aves
- Order: Passeriformes
- Family: Tyrannidae
- Genus: Tolmomyias
- Species: T. viridiceps

Binomial name
- Tolmomyias viridiceps (Sclater, PL & Salvin, 1873)

Synonyms
- Rhynchocyclus viridiceps

= Olive-faced flatbill =

Species of bird

The olive-faced flatbill or olive-faced flycatcher (Tolmomyias viridiceps) is a species of bird in the tyrant flycatcher family Tyrannidae. It is found in Bolivia, Brazil, Colombia, Ecuador, and Peru.

== Taxonomy and systematics ==
The olive-faced flatbill was described by the English ornithologists Philip Sclater and Osbert Salvin in 1873 from a specimen collected in Pebas, Peru. They coined the binomial name Rhynchocyclus viridiceps. It was long treated as a subspecies of the ochre-lored flatbill (T. flaviventris) but is now considered as a separate species based primarily on its very different vocalization. Taxonomic systems began separating them in 2020 and the process continued into 2024.

The olive-faced flatbill has three subspecies, the nominate T. v. viridiceps (Sclater, PL & Salvin, 1873), T. v. zimmeri (Bond, 1947), and T. v. subsimilis (Carriker, 1935).

== Description ==
The olive-faced flatbill is about 12 to 13 cm (4.7 to 5.1 in) long and weighs 11 to 16.4 g (0.39 to 0.58 oz). The sexes have the same plumage. Adults of all three subspecies have an olive head with a faint yellowish supercilium. Their back, rump, and uppertail coverts are olive. Their wings are dusky with yellow edges on the coverts and remiges that appear as two wing bars. Their tail is dusky. Their underparts are dull yellow with an olive wash on the throat and breast. All subspecies have a brown or red-brown to grayish brown iris, a wide flat dark gray or black bill with sometimes a pinkish base to the mandible, and blue-gray or black legs and feet.

== Distribution and habitat ==
The olive-faced flatbill is a bird of the western Amazon Basin. The nominate subspecies is the northernmost and has the largest range of the three. It is found from central and southeastern Colombia south through eastern Ecuador into eastern Peru through Loreto Department into Ucayali Department and east into Brazil to the Negro and lower Madeira rivers. Subspecies T. v. zimmeri is found in northern and central Peru between San Martín and Junín departments. T. v. subsimilis is found from Junín in Peru east into Brazil to the upper Madeira and south into northwestern Bolivia. The species primarily inhabits forest along rivers including the edges of várzea. It less often is found in terra firme and savanna woodland. In elevation it occurs up to 800 m (2,600 ft) in Colombia, mostly up to 800 m (2,600 ft) in Ecuador, and mostly up to 1,000 m (3,300 ft) but locally to 1,500 m (4,900 ft) in Peru.

== Behavior ==
=== Movement ===
The olive-faced flatbill is a year-round resident.

=== Feeding ===
The olive-faced flatbill feeds on a variety of arthropods, though details are lacking. It typically forages singly or in pairs and occasionally joins mixed-species feeding flocks. It feeds mostly in the forest's canopy though sometimes lower. It sits erect, and captures prey mostly with short upward sallies from a perch to grab or hover-glean it from leaves and twigs. It usually lands on a different perch than it started from.

=== Breeding ===
The olive-faced flatbill's breeding season appears to begin late in the year in Peru and include early months in Colombia. Nothing else is known about the species' breeding biology.

=== Vocalization ===
The olive-faced flatbill's song is "a rising series sharp, rising notes: tsu tswee tsweet TSWEET! TSWEET! TSWEET!" and it call is "single high, sharp, rising stweet! notes". It usually sings from a well-hidden perch in the forest canopy, and usually around dawn.

== Status ==
The IUCN has assessed the olive-faced flatbill as being of Least Concern. It has a large range; its population size is not known and is believed to be stable. No immediate threats have been identified. It is considered fairly common in Colombia and Peru and common in Ecuador. It occurs in many protected areas and "[i]ts ability [to] thrive in a wide variety of wooded habitats and to persist in relatively disturbed forests suggests the species is not at any risk".
