= Manicorezinho River =

River in Amazonas, Brazil

- Location within Brazil
- Native name: Rio Manicorezinho (Portuguese)

Location
- Country: Brazil

Physical characteristics
- Source
  - location: Amazonas state
- Mouth
  - location: Manicoré River
  - coordinates: 6.937161°S 61.060982°W

Basin features
- River system: Manicoré River

The Manicorezinho River is a river of Amazonas state in north-western Brazil, a tributary of the Manicoré River.

The river flows through the 359,138 hectares (887,450 acres) Manicoré Biological Reserve, created by decree in May 2016 in the week before the provisional removal of president Dilma Rousseff. The reserve was created in part to preserve the biodiversity of the Manicorezinho.

== See also ==
- List of rivers of Amazonas
