= Manicoré River =

- Location within Brazil
- Native name: Rio (Portuguese)

Location
- Country: Brazil

Physical characteristics
- Source
  - location: Amazonas state
- Mouth
  - coordinates: 5.858936°S 61.328736°W
- Length: 390

Basin features
- River system: Madeira River
- Tributaries
  - right: Manicorezinho, Jatuarana

Manicoré River (Portuguese: Rio Manicoré) is a river of Amazonas state in north-western Brazil. It is a tributary of the Madeira River and merges into this river about 3 km (1.9 mi) upstream from the town of Manicoré.

The headwaters of the river are in the Campos Amazônicos National Park, a 961,318 hectares (2,375,470 acres) protected area created in 2006 that holds an unusual enclave of cerrado vegetation in the Amazon rainforest. Further north the river defines part of the eastern boundary of the 151,993 hectares (375,580 acres) Campos de Manicoré Environmental Protection Area, created in April 2016 just before the provisional removal of president Dilma Rousseff. It then flows through the 359,138 hectares (887,450 acres) Manicoré Biological Reserve, which was created at the same time.

== See also ==
- List of rivers of Amazonas
