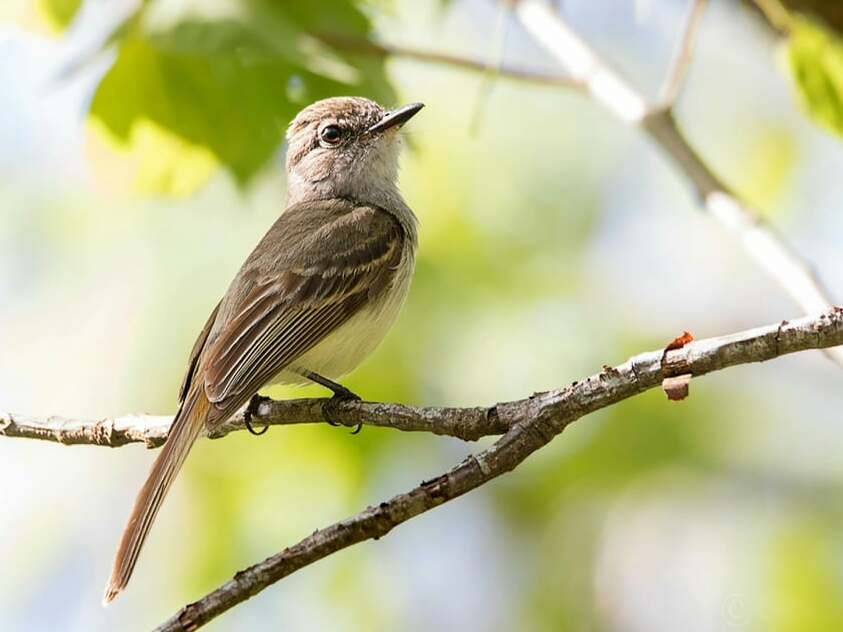

Conservation status
- Least Concern (IUCN 3.1)

Scientific classification
- Kingdom: Animalia
- Phylum: Chordata
- Class: Aves
- Order: Passeriformes
- Family: Tyrannidae
- Genus: Ramphotrigon
- Species: R. flammulatum

Binomial name
- Ramphotrigon flammulatum (Lawrence, 1875)

Synonyms
- Myiarchus flammulatus Lawrence, 1875

= Flammulated flycatcher =

Species of bird

The flammulated flycatcher (Ramphotrigon flammulatum) is a species of bird in the family Tyrannidae. It was formerly placed in the monotypic genus Deltarhynchus but was moved to the genus Ramphotrigon based on genetic analysis. It is endemic to the dry deciduous forest, arid thorn forest, and scrubby woodland of Mexico’s Pacific coast. The flycatcher is an olive to gray-brown bird with a streaked, pale gray chest, white throat, black bill, dark gray feet, and dark brown wings. It is a skulking bird that typically remains hidden in the underbrush. It feeds by gleaning insects off of leaves and twigs that it spots from an exposed perch. The female lays approximately three eggs in a nest made in a shallow tree cavity.

== Taxonomy ==
The species was first described in 1875 by ornithologist George Newbold Lawrence, who placed this species in the genus Myiarchus. However, in 1893 it was split from Myiarchus into the new, monotypic genus Deltarhynchus by Robert Ridgway because of its shorter and broader bill, more rounded wings, and partially streaked underparts. This change was upheld in 1901 by Richard Bowdler Sharpe and by subsequent authors. However, in 1977 ornithologist Melvin Alvah Traylor Jr., while upholding its status as a monotypic genus, said that the species should be lumped back into Myiarchus if its nesting habits were similar to those of that genus. These doubts were to some extent put to rest by Wesley Lanyon's research of the flycatcher in 1979, which confirmed the bird's placement in a monotypic genus. In 1982 and 1985 Wesley Layton argued instead that the flammulated flycatcher was closely related to species in the genus Ramphotrigon. Lanyon's opinion was supported by molecular phylogenetic studies published in 2008 and in 2020 that showed that the flammulated flycatcher was embedded with members of the genus Ramphotrigon making Ramphotrigon paraphyletic with respect to Deltarhynchus. Based on the genetic results the flammulated flycatcher was moved to Ramphotrigon. The specific epithet is derived from the Latin word flammula, which means "little flame". The flycatcher has no subspecies.

== Description ==
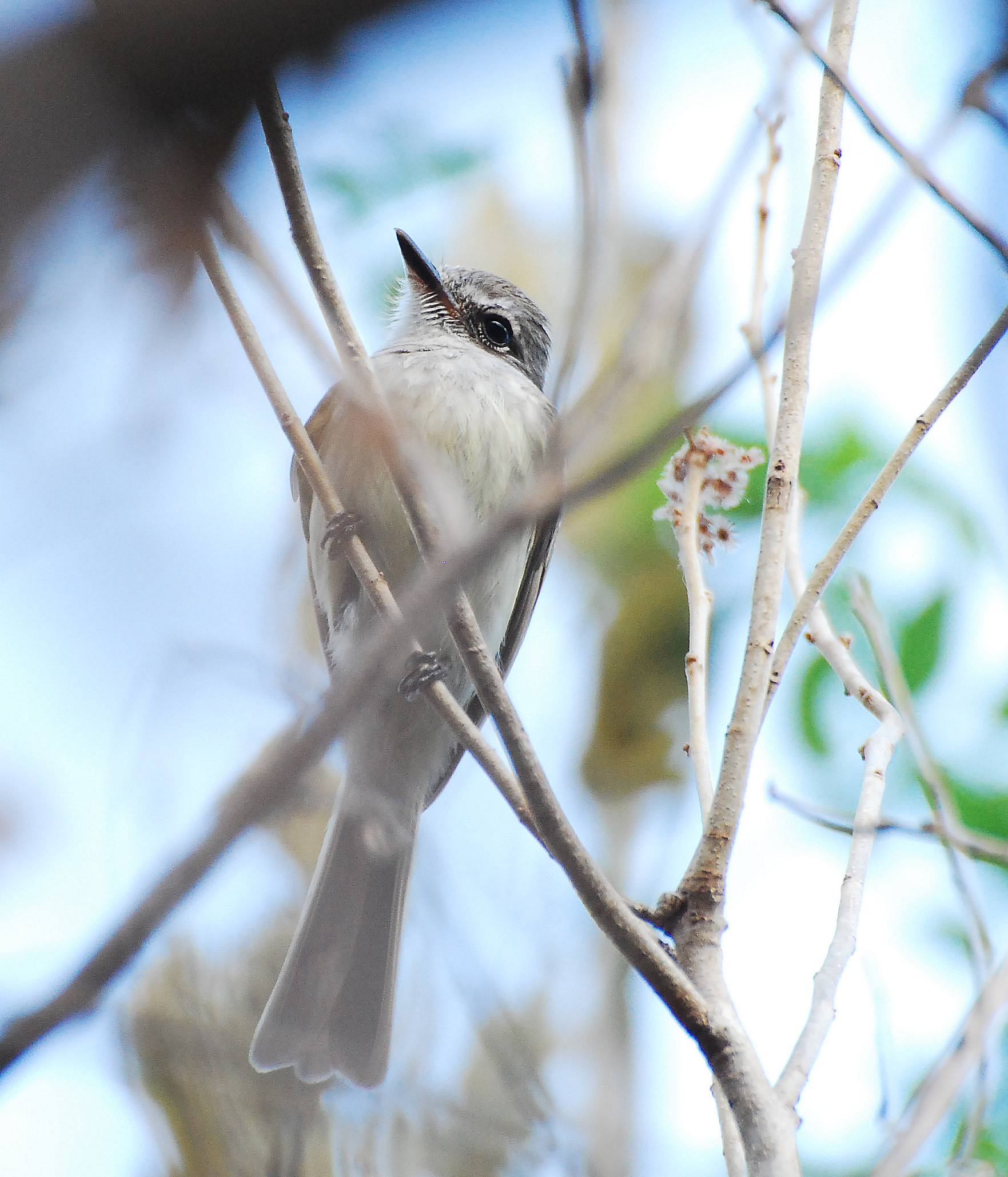
Flammulated flycatcher at Llano de Horno, Mexico.

The flammulated flycatcher is approximately 6 to 6.5 inches (15 to 17 centimetres) in length and has a chunky body. Adult males and females are similar in plumage, with each possessing olive to a worn gray-brown upperparts and head. A whitish supraloral stripe and crescent are behind the bird's eyes. It also has a dusky lore. The throat is whitish and the chest is a pale gray with inconspicuous dusky streaking, while the belly and undertail coverts are a pale yellow. Additionally, this species has dark brown, well-rounded wings with pale cinnamon-edged coverts and remiges. The wings are about 3 inches (7.6 cm) long. The tail is also a dark brown edged with a narrow band of pale cinnamon. It is barely shorter than the wing and slightly rounded. The bird's bill is black, broad, and triangular with a slightly paler base and about half the length of its head. The legs are a dark gray and end with large, curved, and sharp claws. It has an orange mouth and a brown eye. The juvenile is similar to the adult, although the tail has a broad band of pale cinnamon.

=== Vocalization ===
The flammulated flycatcher mostly sings from April to August, which includes its breeding season, and tends to remain hidden while singing. The song of the flycatcher is a plaintive whistle followed by a short but quick roll. It can also give a plaintive and slurred chew call, which is often sung three to five times in a descending series, as well as a squeaky chatter. Calls are the same for males and females and are given throughout the day to give a location, identify an individual, sound an alarm, and mark the limits of a territory, among other functions. During the breeding season, males give what is known as a dawn song every morning, which includes the calls chee-bee beet and churr-r-r-bee bee in alternation.

== Distribution and habitat ==
This flycatcher is endemic to the Pacific lowlands of Mexico's western coast from Sinaloa to western Chiapas, while possibly extending into Guatemala, although this has not been confirmed. The total area that it lives in is estimated to be 66,000 km^{2} (25,482.7 sq mi). Its range is discontinuous and it is found in low densities when present. It lives in dry deciduous forest, arid and semi-arid thorn forest, and scrubby woodland at about 1,000–1,400 meters (3,300–4,600 ft) above sea level. This species is non-migratory.

=== Status ===
The flammulated flycatcher is listed as being of least concern on the IUCN Red List owing to its large range and the belief that the total population numbers over 10,000 individuals; however, no precise estimate on the bird's population exists. While the species is known to be uncommon in parts of its range, its population is not believed to be declining enough to pass the threshold of 30% in ten years or three generations necessary to be listed as near threatened, although the exact population trends also have not been quantified.

== Ecology and behavior ==
This flycatcher is a sluggish and skulking species that usually remains in the underbrush. When excited either by an intruder or when attempting to attract a mate, this species raises the feathers on its crown to form what appears to be a crest; however, unlike the closely related genus Myiarchus, it does not bob its head while displaying the crest.

=== Feeding ===
The flammulated flycatcher forages by perching on an open branch and looking outward and downward for prey, which primarily consists of insects. Once it spots a potential meal, the flycatcher rapidly and directly flies at the insect, which is normally on the exposed upper surface of a leaf or twig. It hovers briefly before the insect before grabbing it in its beak and flying away to typically a new perch.

=== Reproduction ===
The flycatcher breeds around June of each year. It nests in shallow tree cavities that are surprisingly close to the ground, at approximately 90 centimetres (35 in) above it. The nest is shaped like a cup and is composed of fine vegetable fibers, dried leaves, and shredded bark. Unlike the similar Myiarchus flycatchers, it does not use snakeskin or other materials to build its nest. The female lays three eggs that are creamy to pinkish in color and are decorated with brown and gray splotches.
