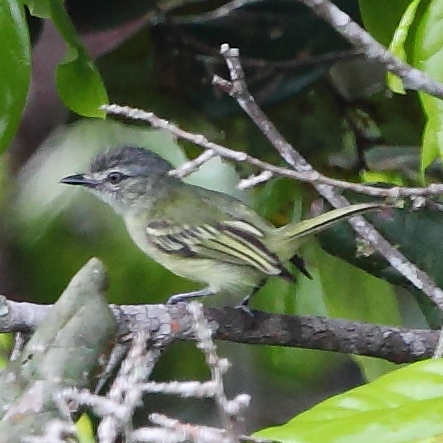
- At Manaus, Brazil

Conservation status
- Least Concern (IUCN 3.1)

Scientific classification
- Kingdom: Animalia
- Phylum: Chordata
- Class: Aves
- Order: Passeriformes
- Family: Tyrannidae
- Genus: Tolmomyias
- Species: T. poliocephalus

Binomial name
- Tolmomyias poliocephalus (Taczanowski, 1884)

= Grey-crowned flatbill =

Species of bird

The grey-crowned flatbill or grey-crowned flycatcher (Tolmomyias poliocephalus) is a species of bird in the family Tyrannidae, the tyrant flycatchers. It is found in every mainland South American country except Argentina, Chile, Paraguay, and Uruguay.

== Taxonomy and systematics ==
The grey-crowned flatbill was originally described as Rhynchocyclus poliocephalus.

The species has three subspecies, the nominate T. p. poliocephalus (Taczanowski, 1884), T. p. klagesi (Ridgway, 1906), and T. p. sclateri (Hellmayr, 1903). Subspecies T. p. klagesi was originally described as a separate species, Rhynchocyclus klagesi, and was treated as such by some early twentieth century authors. By the second half of the century it was widely accepted in its current status. Its validity as a separate taxon has been disputed and some authors include it within T. p. sclateri.

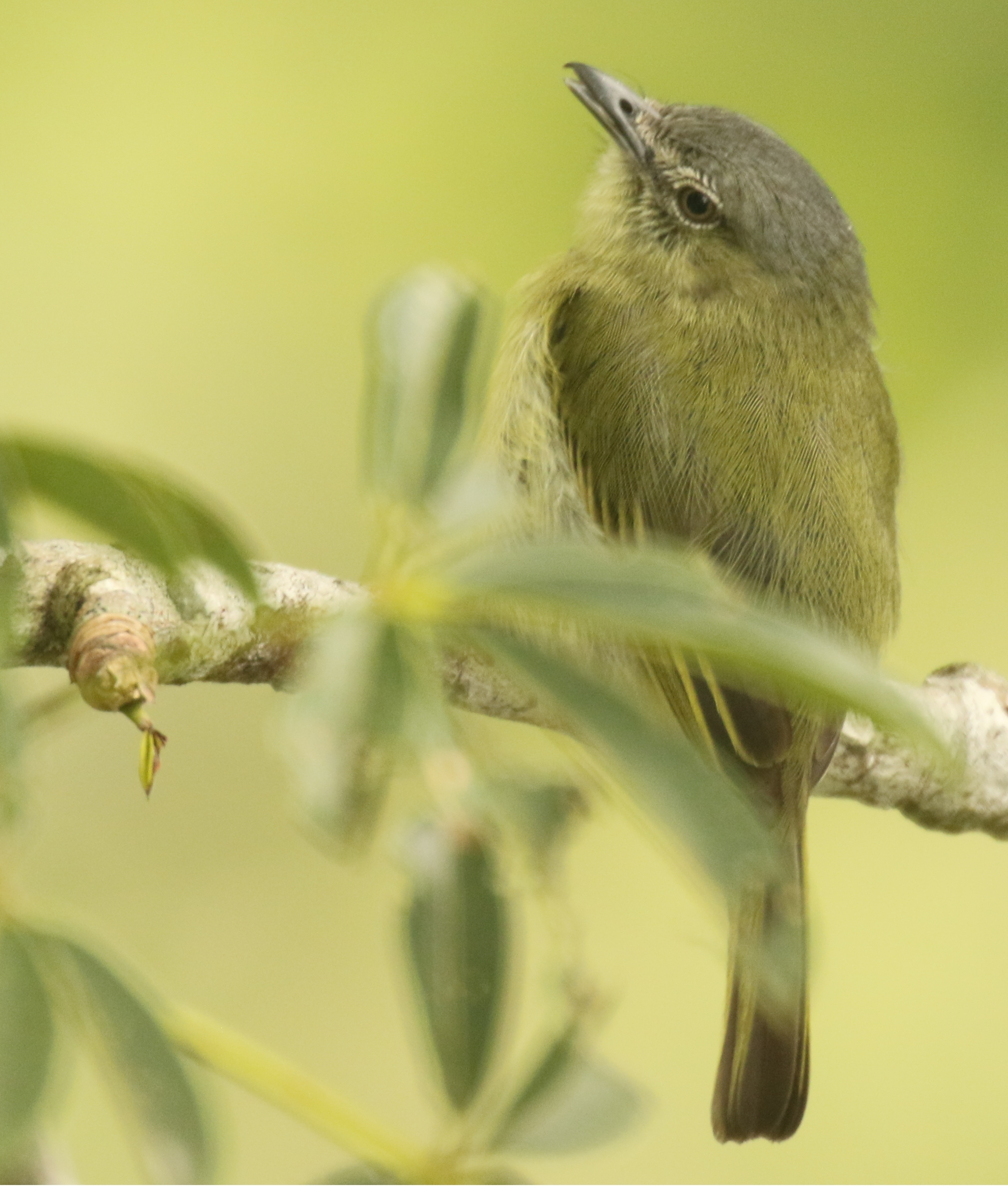
In Yasuni National Park, Ecuador

== Description ==
The gray-crowned flatbill is 12 to 12.5 cm (4.7 to 4.9 in) long and weighs about 11 g (0.39 oz). The sexes have the same plumage. Adults of the nominate subspecies have a mostly gray head with a whitish stripe above the lores, a faint whitish eye-ring, and greenish gray ear coverts. Their back, rump, uppertail coverts are olive. Their wings are blackish with yellow edges on the coverts and remiges that appear as two wing bars and sometimes a pale speculum. Their throat is greenish, their breast and flanks olive, and their belly and vent pale yellow. Subspecies T. p. sclateri has a pale gray throat and a duller green back and paler yellow belly than the nominate. T' p. klagesi is intermediate between the nominate and sclateri. All subspecies have a yellow, pale gray, or pale brown iris, a wide flat bill with a black maxilla and a dark mandible with an orange-pink base, and gray legs and feet.

== Distribution and habitat ==
The borders between the grey-crowned flatbill's subspecies are not well defined. As is best known, the nominate subspecies is found from southern Amazonas state in southwestern Venezuela south through eastern and southeastern Colombia, eastern Ecuador, and eastern Peru and east into western Brazil to the lower Negro and Tefé rivers. T' p. klagesi has a limited range in central and eastern Venezuela from Delta Amacuro south through Bolívar into northern Amazonas. T. p. sclateri has a disjunct distribution. Its main population adjoins those of the other two subspecies. It extends through the Guianas east across northern Brazil to the Atlantic and south through western Brazil to northern and central Bolivia. A smaller population is found separately in eastern Brazil from Pernambuco south to Espírito Santo.

The grey-crowned flatbill primarily inhabits humid forest both terra firme and várzea. It also is found in mature secondary forest. It mostly stays from the forest's mid-story to its canopy. In elevation it mostly occurs below 600 m (2,000 ft) though it reaches 1,000 m (3,300 ft) in Venezuela and Peru and locally as high as 1,400 m (4,600 ft) in the latter country.

== Behavior ==
=== Movement ===
The grey-crowned flatbill is a year-round resident.

=== Feeding ===
The grey-crowned flatbill feeds on insects though details are lacking. It typically forages singly or in pairs and often joins mixed-species feeding flocks. It feeds mostly from the forest's mid-story up to the canopy. It sits with a horizontal pose, often with its tail cocked, and captures prey mostly with short upward sallies from a perch to grab or hover-glean it from leaves.

=== Breeding ===
The grey-crowned flatbill's breeding season in Colombia apparently extends at least from January to June; its season elsewhere is unknown. It nest is a bag typically suspended between 2 and 25 m (5 and 80 ft) above the ground and often near a wasp nest. The clutch size is two eggs. The incubation period, time to fledging, and details of parental care are not known.

=== Vocalization ===
The grey-crowned flatbill's vocalizations vary among the subspecies. The nominate's song is described as "a repeated, inflected, somewhat wheezy fiwee?" which may be given in a short series or with pauses of one or two seconds between notes. A similar description is "a rising series of clear rising or rising-falling whistles, last notes quavering tuee? tuee? TUEE? tuEEuEE? tuEEuEE?. Subspecies T. p. sclateri sings an "unstructured series of well-spaced feeh notes" more fully described as a "series of 3–6 flatter, fife-like shrill pfee or fwee whistles with last 3 notes higher-pitched and inflected" It calls are variations on a down-gliding "fwéeeeh".

== Status ==
The IUCN has assessed the grey-crowned flatbill as being of Least Concern. It has a very large range; its population size is not known and is believed to be decreasing. No immediate threats have been identified. It is considered overall uncommon to common and occurs in many protected areas both public and private. It is fairly common in Colombia and Peru and common in Venezuela. "[M]uch of its habitat remains in relatively good condition".
