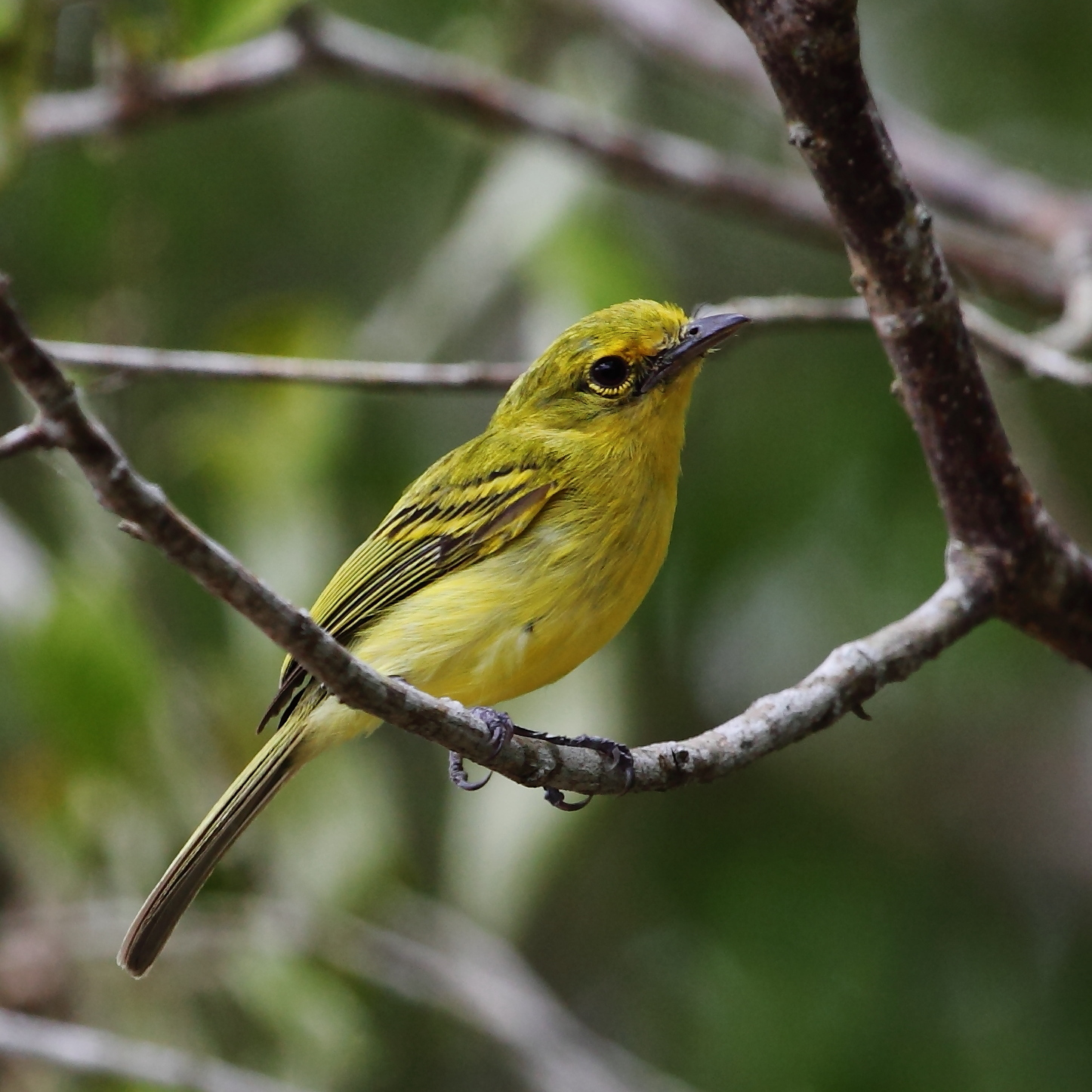
- at Riachuelo, Rio Grande do Norte state, Brazil.

Conservation status
- Least Concern (IUCN 3.1)

Scientific classification
- Kingdom: Animalia
- Phylum: Chordata
- Class: Aves
- Order: Passeriformes
- Family: Tyrannidae
- Genus: Tolmomyias
- Species: T. flaviventris

Binomial name
- Tolmomyias flaviventris (Wied-Neuwied, 1831)
- Range of ochre-lored and olive-faced flatbills (See the Taxonomy section)

= Ochre-lored flatbill =

Species of bird

The ochre-lored flatbill (Tolmomyias flaviventris) or yellow-breasted flycatcher, is a passerine bird in the family Tyrannidae, the tyrant flycatchers. It is found in Bolivia, Brazil, Colombia, French Guiana, Guyana, Panama, Suriname, Trinidad and Tobago, and Venezuela.

== Taxonomy and systematics ==
The ochre-lored flatbill was originally described as Muscipeta flaventris.

The ochre-lored flatbill's taxonomy is complicated. As of early 2025 it was assigned three subspecies, the nominate T. f. flaventris (Wied-Neuwied, 1831), T. f. aurulentus (Todd, 1913), and T. f. dissors (Zimmer, JT, 1939). The three subspecies of what is now the olive-faced flatbill (T. viridiceps) were previously included within the ochre-lored. Taxonomic systems began separating them in 2020 and the process continued into 2024. Two other subspecies, T. f. collingwoodi and T. f. gloriosus have been proposed to be separated from T. f. aurulentus. They might be valid, and some subspecies may warrant treatment as full species.

== Description ==
The ochre-lored flatbill is about 12 to 13 cm (4.7 to 5.1 in) long and weighs 9 to 17.5 g (0.32 to 0.62 oz). The sexes have the same plumage. Adults of the nominate subspecies have a yellowish olive head with a brighter ochre-tinged stripe above the lores and a brighter ochre-tinged eye-ring. Their back, rump, and uppertail coverts are yellowish olive. Their wings are dusky with yellowish edges on the coverts and remiges that appear as two wing bars. Their tail is dusky. Their underparts are bright yellow with an olive to ochre wash on the throat and breast and lightly on the belly. Subspecies T. f. aurulentus is darker overall than the nominate with richer yellow underparts. T. f. dissors is slightly smaller than the nominate but otherwise the same. All subspecies have a brown or red-brown iris, a wide flat dark gray or black bill with sometimes a pinkish base to the mandible, and blue-gray or black legs and feet.

== Distribution and habitat ==
The ochre-lored flatbill ranges from eastern Panama to Bolivia and southern Brazil. Subspecies T. f. aurulentus is the northernmost. It is found from eastern Panama east through northern and eastern Colombia, in northern and central Venezuela from Zulia south into Bolívar, in the Guianas, in northern Brazil north of the Amazon from the Branco River to the Atlantic in Amapá and northern Pará, and on Trinidad, Tobago. (As of 2009 it was known in Panama only near El Real in extreme eastern Darién Province.) Subspecies T. f. dissors is found from northwestern Bolívar and Amazonas states in southern Venezuela south and east in Brazil from the Tapajós River to the Tocantins River. The nominate subspecies is found in eastern Brazil south of the Amazon from Maranhão south to Mato Grosso and coastally to Rio de Janeiro, and into eastern Bolivia's Santa Cruz Department.

The ochre-lored flatbill inhabits a wide variety of landscapes. These include dry to humid forest and woodlands, gallery forest, restinga, and caatinga. In the Amazon Basin it mostly is found along waterways, often at the edge of várzea. It less often occurs in terra firme and savanna woodland, though more often in savanna in Venezuela than elsewhere. On Trinidad and in the Guianas it inhabits mangroves. In elevation it reaches 800 m (2,600 ft) in Colombia, 900 m (3,000 ft) in Venezuela, and 1,000 m (3,300 ft) in Brazil.

== Behavior ==
=== Movement ===
The ochre-lored flatbill is a year-round resident.

=== Feeding ===
The ochre-lored flatbill feeds on a wide variety of insects; on Trinidad and Tobago it also feeds on berries. It typically forages singly or in pairs and occasionally joins mixed-species feeding flocks. It feeds mostly in the forest's canopy though sometimes lower. It sits erect, and captures prey mostly with short upward sallies from a perch to grab or hover-glean it from leaves and twigs. It usually lands on a different perch than it started from.

=== Breeding ===
The ochre-lored flatbill's breeding season varies geographically. It spans March to June in Colombia, January to July and May to September in different parts of Venezuela, May to June on Tobago and nearby Brazil, and January to September in Suriname. It Brazil it includes June in Pernambuco and October in Amapá. Its nest is a pear-shaped bag with an entrance tube that leads up to near the bottom of it. It is made from rootlets and plant fibers and sometimes includes moss and bryophytes. The clutch is two or three eggs that are creamy white with a few purplish or brownish spots. The female alone incubates for about 16 to 17 days. Both parents brood and provision nestlings. The time to fledging and other details of parental care are not known.

=== Vocalization ===
The ochre-lored flatbill sings "3-5 rather loud, penetrating whistles, sweeEP!....sweeEP!.....sweeEP!, with pauses of 1-several sec between notes". Its call is "a single sweeEP!". It also makes a "mid-high, short fddddddddfit rattle". It usually sings from a well-hidden perch in the forest canopy, and usually around dawn.

== Status ==
The IUCN has assessed the ochre-lored flatbill as being of Least Concern. It has a very large range; its population size is not known and is believed to be stable. No immediate threats have been identified. It is considered fairly common in Colombia and common in Venezuela. It occurs in many protected areas and "[i]ts ability [to] thrive in a wide variety of wooded habitats and to persist in relatively disturbed forests suggests the species is not at any risk".
