= Mapiá Grande River =

River in Amazonas, Brazil

Coordinates: 4°19′55″S 59°14′34″W

Location
- Country: Brazil

Physical characteristics
- Source
  - location: Amazonas state
- Mouth
  - location: Canumã River

Mapiá Grande River is a tributary of the Canumã River in the Amazonas state in north-western Brazil.

== See also ==
- List of rivers of Amazonas
