= Acari River (Amazonas) =

River in Brazil

- Location within Brazil
- Native name: Rio Acari (Portuguese)

Location
- Country: Brazil

Physical characteristics
- Source
  - location: Amazonas state
- Mouth
  - coordinates: 5.282220°S 59.681626°W

Basin features
- River system: Canumã River

Acari River (Portuguese: Rio Acari) is a river of Amazonas state in north-western Brazil.

== Course ==
The river flows through the 896,411 hectares (2,215,080 acres) Acari National Park created by president Dilma Rousseff in 2016 in the last week before her provisional removal from office. It defines the eastern boundary of the 589,611 hectares (1,456,960 acres) Juma Sustainable Development Reserve, created in 2006. It joins the Sucunduri River from the left, and the downstream section is known as the Canumã River.

== See also ==
- List of rivers of Amazonas

== Sources ==
- PARNA do Acari (in Portuguese), ISA: Instituto Socioambiental
- Viana, Virgilio (March 2010), Plano de Gestão da RDS do Juma (PDF) (in Portuguese)
