= Acari National Park =

National park in Amazonas, Brazil

- IUCN category II (national park)
- Location within Brazil
- Nearest city: Apuí, Amazonas
- Coordinates: 6.305°S 59.293°W
- Area: 896,410.95 ha (3,461.0620 sq mi)
- Designation: National park
- Created: 11 May 2016
- Administrator: Chico Mendes Institute for Biodiversity Conservation

Acari National Park (Portuguese: Parque Nacional do Acari) is a national park in the state of Amazonas, Brazil.

== Location ==
The Acari National Park covers parts of the municipalities of Apuí (11.77%), Borba (59.55%) and Novo Aripuanã (28.68%) in Amazonas. It is north of the BR-230 Trans-Amazonian Highway in the Apuí – Jacareacanga section. The Urupadi National Forest and the Alto Maués Ecological Station border the park to the east. It has an area of 896,410.95 hectares (2,215,079.7 acres). It is in the Amazon biome.

== History ==
The Acari National Park was created by federal decree on 11 May 2016. It is administered by the Chico Mendes Institute for Biodiversity Conservation (ICMBio). The objective is to protect the biological diversity of the Acari, Camaiú, Sucunduri and Abacaxis rivers and their tributaries and the physical landscape, to ensure sustainability of the ecosystem services, to contribute to environmental stability in the region and to provide for development of recreational activities in contact with nature and ecotourism.

The park was one of five conservation units created in last week before the provisional removal of president Dilma Rousseff, totalling 2,600,000 hectares (6,400,000 acres), all in the south of Amazonas state. These were the fully protected Manicoré Biological Reserve with 359,063 hectares (887,260 acres) and Acari National Park with 896,407 hectares (2,215,070 acres), and the sustainable use Campos de Manicoré Environmental Protection Area with 151,993 hectares (375,580 acres), Aripuanã National Forest with 751,295 hectares (1,856,490 acres) and Urupadi National Forest with 537,228 hectares (1,327,520 acres). The same package expanded the Amanã National Forest by 141,000 hectares (350,000 acres).

With these units the Dilma government had created about 3,400,000 hectares (8,400,000 acres) of new protected areas during her administration, compared to about 26,800,000 hectares (66,000,000 acres) by her predecessor Luiz Inácio Lula da Silva. Her administration had also reduced the area of seven protected areas in the Amazon to allow for construction of dams on the Tapajós.

== Sources ==
- FLONA de Urupadi (in Portuguese), ISA: Instituto Socioaambiental
- "No apagar das luzes, governo Dilma cria 5 unidades de conservação", ((o))eco (in Portuguese), 12 May 2016
- Parna do Acari (in Portuguese), Chico Mendes Institute for Biodiversity Conservation, archived from the original on 2019-08-27
- PARNA do Acari (in Portuguese), ISA: Instituto Socioambiental
