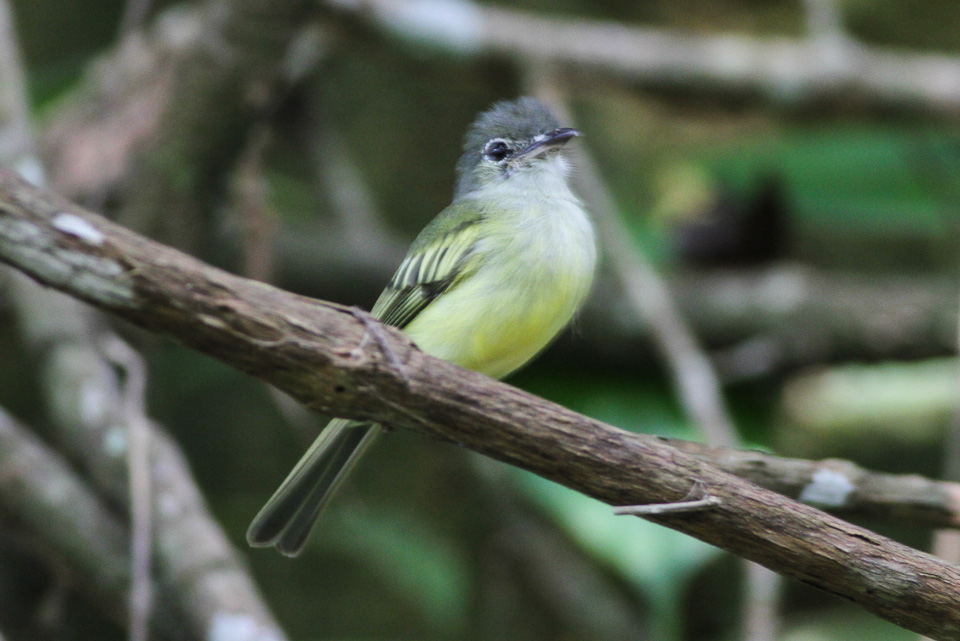
- In Panama

Conservation status
- Least Concern (IUCN 3.1)

Scientific classification
- Kingdom: Animalia
- Phylum: Chordata
- Class: Aves
- Order: Passeriformes
- Family: Tyrannidae
- Genus: Tolmomyias
- Species: T. flavotectus

Binomial name
- Tolmomyias flavotectus (Hartert, 1902)

= Yellow-winged flatbill =

Species of bird

The yellow-winged flatbill (Tolmomyias flavotectus), also known as yellow-winged flycatcher and yellow-margined flatbill, is a species of bird in the tyrant flycatcher family Tyrannidae. It is found in Colombia, Costa Rica, Ecuador, and Panama.

== Taxonomy and systematics ==
The yellow-winged flatbill was originally described by the German ornithologist Ernst Hartert in 1902. He coined the trinomial name Rhynchocyclus megacephala flavotectus and specified the type location as Hacienda Paramba, Imbabura, Ecuador. It was long treated as a subspecies of what is now the yellow-margined flatbill (Tolmomyias assimilis) which is found to the east of the Andes and has very different vocalization. Taxonomic systems began separating them in 2016 and the process continued until 2024. Confusingly, for a time T. flavotectus was called the yellow-margined flatbill.

The yellow-winged flatbill is monotypic.

== Description ==
The yellow-winged flatbill is 13 to 13.5 cm (5.1 to 5.3 in) long and weighs about 15 g (0.53 oz). The sexes have the same plumage. Adults have a mostly dark gray head with a white eye-ring. Their back, rump, uppertail coverts, and tail are olive-green. Their wings are dusky with wide yellow feather edges that give the species its English name. Their throat and breast are pale gray with a yellowish wash and their belly and undertail coverts are yellow. They have an olive to dark brown iris, a wide flat bill with a black maxilla and a pale brownish to horn mandible, and gray legs and feet. Juveniles have less gray on their head and less distinct yellow edges on the wings than adults.

== Distribution and habitat ==
The yellow-winged flatbill is primarily found along the Caribbean slope from northern Costa Rica south through Panama and then through western Colombia to northern Pichincha Province in Ecuador. In Colombia its range extends east to southwestern Bolívar Department. There are also a few records in southern Nicaragua and the species' range formerly extended much further south in Ecuador. The species inhabits the interior and edges of wet forest, mature secondary forest, and plantations. In elevation it reaches 600 m (2,000 ft) in northern Costa Rica, 1,000 m (3,300 ft) in southern Costa Rica and Panama, 1,200 m (3,900 ft) in Colombia, and 500 m (1,600 ft) in Ecuador.

== Behavior ==
=== Movement ===
The yellow-winged flatbill is a year-round resident.

=== Feeding ===
The yellow-winged flatbill primarily feeds on insects, though details are lacking. It typically forages singly or in pairs and regularly joins mixed-species feeding flocks. It feeds mostly from the forest's mid-story up to the canopy but will go lower at the edges. Other details of its feeding behavior appear to be similar to those of the yellow-margined flatbill, which see here.

=== Breeding ===
The yellow-winged flatbill's breeding season has not been fully defined but appears to span at least April to June. Its nest is a pear-shaped bag with a tunnel entrance that slopes up to near the bottom of the bag. It is made from thin plant fibers and fungal rhizomorphs. It typically hangs from the tip of a branch or vine between about 9 and 21 m (30 and 70 ft) above the ground, and often is built near a wasp nest. The clutch size, incubation period, time to fledging, and details of parental care are not known.

=== Vocalization ===
The yellow-winged flatbill's song has been described as "an emphatic tssk, tssp, tssp, tssp" and "a harsh and very emphatic series of short notes, zhweyk, zhwek-zhwek-zhwek-zhwek. The species typically sings from a well-hidden perch high in the forest, and mostly in the morning and late afternoon.

== Status ==
The IUCN has assessed the yellow-winged flatbill as being of Least Concern. It has a large range; its population size is not known and is believed to be decreasing. No immediate threats have been identified. It is considered uncommon to locally fairly common overall though fairly common in Costa Rica and common in Colombia. It occurs in several protected areas. "Much of its habitat remains in relatively pristine condition within its range. Probably locally extinct in areas where deforestation has been intense (e.g., southwestern Ecuador)."
