= Santo Antônio de Matupi =

- Location within Brazil
- Coordinates: 7.926843°S 61.566588°W
- Country: Brazil
- State: Amazonas
- Municipality: Manicoré

Population (2011)
  - Total: 9,139

Santo Antônio de Matupi, also called Km 180, is a small town on the Trans-Amazonian Highway (BR-230) in the state of Amazonas, Brazil. The economy mainly depends on timber extraction and cattle farming. Compared to other communities in the state it is relatively prosperous, but there are crimes related to drugs, vehicle theft and so on.

== Location ==
Santo Antônio do Matupi is a community on the BR-230 highway in the Matupi region of the municipality of Manicoré, at an average altitude of 60 to 150 metres (200 to 490 ft) above sea level. The community is just north of the Campos Amazônicos National Park. It is south of the 151,993 hectares (375,580 acres) Campos de Manicoré Environmental Protection Area (APA), created in April 2016 just before the provisional removal of president Dilma Rousseff. The purpose of the APA is to protect biological diversity and control the process of occupying the region, in particular along the road being built between Santo Antônio de Matupi and the seat of the municipality of Manicoré on the Madeira River.

== Population ==
As of 2011 the Matupi region had 9,139 inhabitants in 2,868 homes, of which 5,870 inhabitants lived in 1,677 homes in the urban area. There were 85,000 head of cattle, 612 registered producers and 473 landowners. In 2002 the Dom Pedro II municipal school had 45 students. This rose to 1079 students in 2008, then fell back to 583 students in 2011. In 2009 the Santo Antônio de Matupi state school had 806 students. A meeting of residents in June 2014 discussed turning Santo Antônio de Matupi into a municipality. The town met the criteria of having more than 6,000 inhabitants and not being in an environmental protection area or on public lands.

== Economy ==
Santo Antônio do Matupí is a major centre of logging. With good communications, in 2010 it was one of the ten highest tax paying communities in Amazonas. In June 2014 the president of the Association of Matupi Rural Producers said the local economy was strong, the fourth largest cattle producer in the state and the largest timber producer. Timber production is supervised by the Brazilian Institute of Environment and Renewable Natural Resources (IBAMA) and all wood is certified. The community is supplied with electricity by Eletrobrás.

In April 2015 the Amazonas government launched a campaign for Rural Environmental Registration in the town, coordinated by the Ministry of the Environment (SEMA) and executed by the Amazonas Institute of Environmental Protection (IPAAM). The purpose was to ensure that owners or possessors of rural property preserve 80% of that property. If they exceeded 20% clearance they had to replant to ensure forest regeneration. Property owners who registered would receive an environmental license, suspension of fines and access to credit and financing.

In June 2015 police investigating a murder in the community arrested a woman selling drugs from her porch. A search of the house found several portions of crack, a revolver, ammunition, dead snakes, alligator legs and assorted appliances. They also seized four vehicles, including one from Paraguay whose driver was carrying over R$13,000 in cash, and was taken to the Humaitá police station for questioning. An official said the Matupi region was full of stolen, tampered with and cloned vehicles.

== Sources ==
- Amazônia de Todos, "Km 180 - Santo Antônio do Matupi - Motivos Para Emancipação", Folha de Manicoré (in Portuguese)
- Brasil ganha cinco novas áreas protegidas no sul do Amazonas (in Portuguese), WWF Brasil, 16 May 2016
- "Operação da PC e PRF prendem 'Lúcia do 180' por tráfico de drogas na BR 230", Em Tempo (in Portuguese), 18 June 2015
- "Num de seus últimos atos, Dilma cria APA, Reserva e amplia floresta no Amazonas", A Critica (in Portuguese), Rede Calderaro de Comunicação, 12 April 2016
- PARNA dos Campos Amazônicos (in Portuguese), ISA: Instituto Socioambiental
- Santo Antônio de Matupi recebe mutirão de Cadastro Ambiental Rural nesta terça-feira, 7 (in Portuguese), Government of Amazonas, 6 April 2015
- Tony Medeiros orienta moradores Santo Antônio de Matupi sobre criação de municípios (in Portuguese), Legislative Assembly of the State of Amazonas, 2 June 2014
