= Sucunduri River =

River in Brazil

- Location within Brazil
- Native name: Rio Sucunduri (Portuguese)

Location
- Country: Brazil

Physical characteristics
- Source
  - location: Amazonas state
- Mouth
  - coordinates: 5.286561°S 59.672539°W

Basin features
- River system: Canumã River
- Tributaries
  - left: Camaiú River

Sucunduri River (Portuguese: Rio Sucundurí) is a river of Amazonas state in north-western Brazil, one of the main headwaters of the Canumã River.

== Course ==
The Sucunduri River rises in the 808,312 hectares (1,997,380 acres) Sucunduri State Park in the municipality of Apuí. The Monte Cristo rapids on the Sucunduri is an area with great numbers and diversity of animals and birds. In 2006 it was also the location of an illegal mining settlement. The Monte Cristo rapids and the Sucunduri River Falls (Saltos do Rio Sucunduri) are well-known attractions.

The river flows through the 896,411 hectares (2,215,080 acres) Acari National Park created by president Dilma Rousseff in 2016 in the last week before her provisional removal from office. Part of the river's basin is in the 19,582 square kilometres (7,561 sq mi) Juruena National Park, one of the largest conservation units in Brazil. The Sucunduri basin occupies 10% of the park. The Trans-Amazonian Highway crosses the Sucunduri River. Further north it merges with the Acari and the downstream section is known as the Canumã River. When treated as a single river, it is known as the Canumã-Sucunduri.

== See also ==
- List of rivers of Amazonas

== Sources ==
- Ana Cíntia Guazzelli; Cláudio Maretti (27 June 2006), Pesquisadores encontram espécies que podem ser novas para a ciência, WWF Brasil
- PARNA do Acari (in Portuguese), ISA: Instituto Socioambiental
- PES do Sucunduri (in Portuguese), ISA: Instituto Socioambiental
- Unidade de Conservação: Parque Nacional do Juruena (in Portuguese), MMA: Ministério do Meio Ambiente
