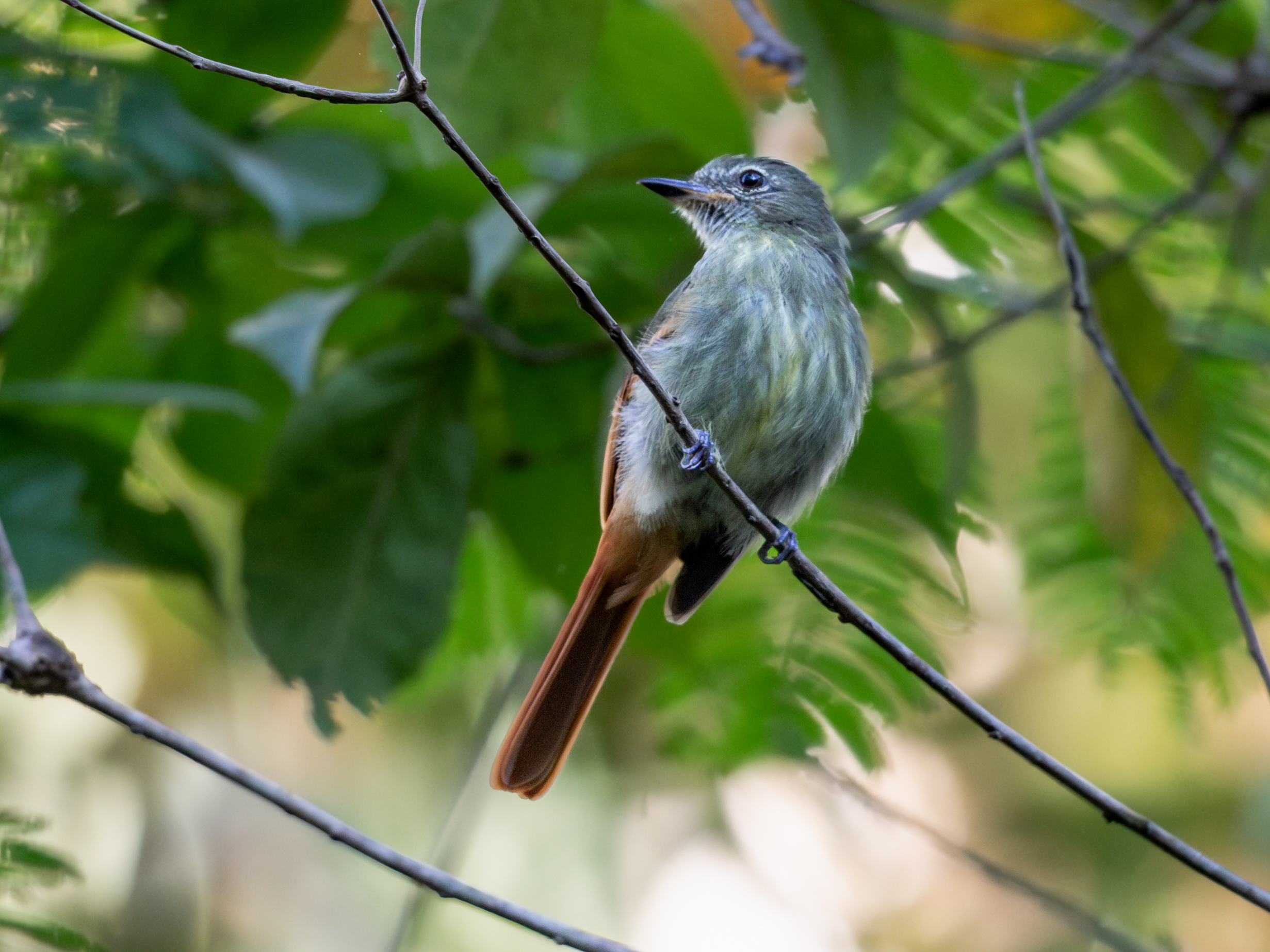
- Rufous-tailed flatbill (Ramphotrigon ruficauda)

Scientific classification
- Kingdom: Animalia
- Phylum: Chordata
- Class: Aves
- Order: Passeriformes
- Family: Tyrannidae
- Genus: Ramphotrigon; G.R. Gray, 1855

Type species
- Platyrhynchus ruficauda von Spix, 1825

Species
- 4, see text.

Synonyms
- Rhamphotrygon Sundevall, 1872 (unjustified emendation)

= Ramphotrigon =

Genus of birds

Ramphotrigon is a genus of tyrant flycatchers in the family Tyrannidae.

== Species ==
Established in 1872 by George Robert Gray, it contains four species:

Image	Common name	Scientific name	Distribution
	Large-headed flatbill	Ramphotrigon megacephalum	Colombia, Venezuela, southern Amazonia and Atlantic forest.
	Flammulated flycatcher	Ramphotrigon flammulatum	western Mexican coastline
	Rufous-tailed flatbill	Ramphotrigon ruficauda	Amazonia
	Dusky-tailed flatbill	Ramphotrigon fuscicauda	western Amazonia : Ecuador, Peru, Acre and Bolivia

The name Ramphotrigon is a combination of the Greek words rhamphos, meaning "bill" and trigonōn, meaning "triangle".
