= Canumã River =

River in Brazil

Canumã River Sucunduri River

Location
- Country: Brazil

Physical characteristics
- Source: confluence of the Acari and Sucunduri Rivers
  - location: Amazonas, Brazil
- Mouth: Madeira River
  - location: Amazonas, Brazil
  - coordinates: 3°59′39″S 59°05′44″W
- Length: 900 km (560 mi)
- Basin size: 52,432.5 km^{2} (20,244.3 sq mi)
- Discharge
  - location: Foz do Canumã, Amazonas (near mouth)
  - average: (Period: 1971-2000)2,135.4 m^{3}/s (75,410 cu ft/s)

Basin features
- Tributaries
  - left: Mapiá Grande River
  - right: Pacová River

Canumã River (Portuguese: Rio Canumã) is a river in the Amazonas state in north-western Brazil. It is located east of the Madeira River and runs roughly parallel to it. It flows into the Paraná Urariá shortly before merging into the Madeira River (the short channel between Canumã River/Paraná Urariá and the Madeira River is known as the Paraná do Canumã). Through the Paraná Urariá it is also connected to several other smaller rivers and ultimately Paraná do Ramos (mean annual discharge 2930 m^{3}/s) which is a side channel of the Amazon River itself. The Canumã has its source at the confluence of the Acari and Sucunduri Rivers. The latter and Canumã can be considered as the upper and lower sections of a single river, in which case it is known as the Canumã-Sucunduri.

== See also ==
- List of rivers of Amazonas
