= Urupadi National Forest =

National forest in Brazil

- Floresta Nacional de Urupadi
- IUCN category VI (protected area with sustainable use of natural resources)
- Location within Brazil
- Nearest city: Maués, Amazonas
- Coordinates: 6.164710°S 58.462921°W
- Area: 538,081.09 hectares (1,329,627.3 acres)
- Designation: National forest (Brazil)
- Created: 11 May 2016
- Administrator: Chico Mendes Institute for Biodiversity Conservation

Urupadi National Forest (Portuguese: Floresta Nacional de Urupadi) is a national forest (Brazil) in the state of Amazonas, Brazil.

== Location ==
Urupadi National Forest is in the Maués municipality of Amazonas. It has an area of 538,081.09 hectares (1,329,627.3 acres). The forest is just north of the stretch of the BR-230 Trans-Amazonian Highway between Sucunduri (Apuí) and Jacareacanga. It adjoins the Acari National Park to the west and the Alto Maués Ecological Station to the north. To the east it adjoins the Amaná National Forest in the state of Pará.

It is in the Amazon biome. The region has suffered relatively low deforestation, but there is growing pressure from loggers, ranchers and soybean farmers. The soils are acid and infertile, unsuitable for agriculture and pasture.

== History ==
Urupadi National Forest was created by decree on 11 May 2016. It is administered by the Chico Mendes Institute for Biodiversity Conservation (ICMBio).

The forest is one of five conservation units created in the last week before the provisional removal of president Dilma Rousseff, totalling 2,600,000 hectares (6,400,000 acres), all in the south of Amazonas state. These were the fully protected Manicoré Biological Reserve with 359,063 hectares (887,260 acres) and Acari National Park with 896,407 hectares (2,215,070 acres), and the sustainable use Campos de Manicoré Environmental Protection Area with 151,993 hectares (375,580 acres), Aripuanã National Forest with 751,295 hectares (1,856,490 acres) and Urupadi National Forest with 537,228 hectares (1,327,520 acres). The same package expanded the Amaná National Forest by 141,000 hectares (350,000 acres).

With these units the Dilma government had created about 3,400,000 hectares (8,400,000 acres) of new protected areas during her administration, compared to about 26,800,000 hectares (66,000,000 acres) by her predecessor Luiz Inácio Lula da Silva. Her administration had also reduced the area of seven protected areas in the Amazon to allow for construction of dams on the Tapajós.

== Sources ==
- Flona de Urupadi (in Portuguese), Chico Mendes Institute for Biodiversity Conservation
- FLONA de Urupadi (in Portuguese), ISA: Instituto Socioaambiental
- "No apagar das luzes, governo Dilma cria 5 unidades de conservação", ((o))eco (in Portuguese), 12 May 2016
- PARNA do Acari (in Portuguese), ISA: Instituto Socioambiental
