= Manicoré =

Municipality of Amazonas, Brazil

- Municipality
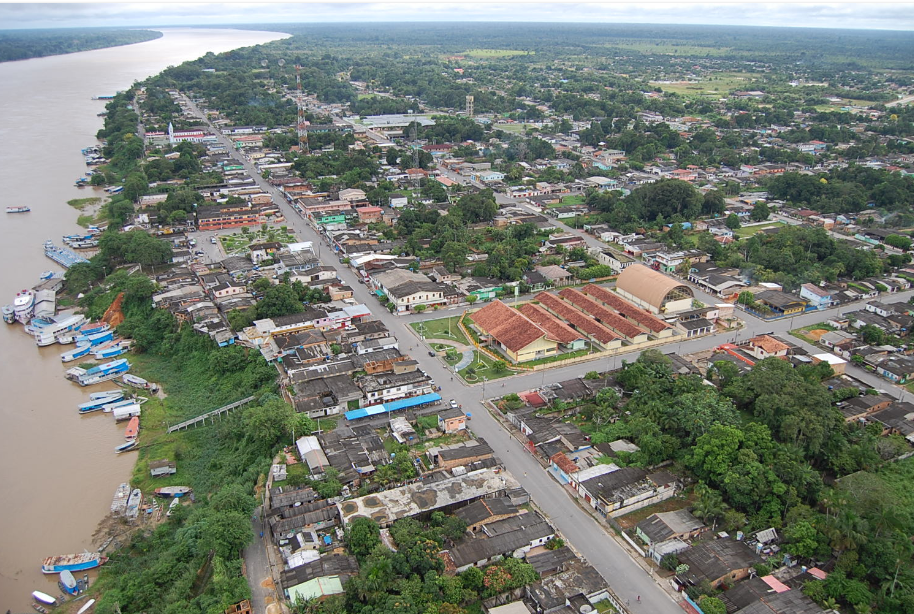
- Manicoré town on the banks of the Madeira River

- Flag Seal

- Amazonas state with Manicore municipality in red

- Location in Brazil
- Coordinates: 5°48′32″S 61°18′00″W
- Country: Brazil
- Region: North
- State: Amazonas

Government
  - Mayor: Manuel Sebastiao Pimentel Medeiros (PSD)

Area
  - Total: 48,282 km^{2} (18,642 sq mi)
- Elevation: 32 m (105 ft)

Population (2021)
  - Total: 57,405
- Time zone: UTC−4 (AMT)

Manicoré is a municipality located in the south-east of the Brazilian state of Amazonas.

== History ==
Manicoré's origins date back to 1637, with the expedition of Pedro Teixeira, a Portuguese explorer and military man.

The authorities of Grão-Pará sent an escort to the Madeira River in 1716, commanded by João de Barros e Guerra, an experienced captain. In 1797, the village of Crato was founded, under orders from the Governor of Grão-Pará, with a view to facilitating commercial transactions between Pará, Mato Grosso and Goiás. The village was transferred to a site between the Baetas and Arraias rivers, in 1802.

On July 4, 1858, through Law no. 96, the parish of São João Batista do Crato is created. Ten years later, on July 6, 1868, the parish seat was transferred to the town of Manicoré, under Law no. 177, becoming known as Nossa Senhora das Dores de Manicoré. Only on July 4, 1877, Manicoré was elevated to the category of Village and the Judiciary Term was created, by Law nº. 362.

The following year, in 1878, Law nº. 386, which makes Manicoré the seat of the Comarca do Rio Madeira. On December 12, 1881, the district was installed. From then on, Manicoré began to receive intense migration from the Northeast, who had fled mainly from the Great Drought of 1877-1878 and also attracted by the Rubber Cycle, which took place in Amazonas and in regions of the state of Acre. Due to its privileged geographic location, Manicoré was a passageway for migrants destined for Acre. Received city jurisdiction on May 15, 1896, by Law no. 137.

State law no. 96, of December 19, 1955, dismembered part of the territory of Manicoré to form the municipality of Novo Aripuanã. On December 10, 1981, through Constitutional Amendment No. 12, another part of its territory was dismembered, to create the then municipality of Auxiliadora, which, however, was never installed, and its former territory was again encompassed by the municipality of Manicoré.

== Geography ==
The population of Manicoré was 56,583 (2020) and its area is 48,282 km^{2}. The town is located on the banks of the Madeira River about 3 km (1.9 mi) downstream from where the Manicoré River merges into the Madeira. According to data from the National Institute of Meteorology (INMET), for the period 1967 to 1990 and from 1993 onwards, the lowest temperature recorded in Manicoré was 9.4 °C, which occurred on May 17, 1968, and the highest reached 39.8 °C on three occasions, the first being on 11 November 1983 and the other two in 1989, on 14 August and 14 September. The highest precipitation accumulation in 24 hours reached 168 millimeters (mm) on November 11, 1968. February 1989, with 814.2 mm, was the month with the highest rainfall.

=== Climate ===
Climate data for Manicoré (1981–2010, extremes 1967–present)
Month	Jan	Feb	Mar	Apr	May	Jun	Jul	Aug	Sep	Oct	Nov	Dec	Year
Record high °C (°F)	36.8 (98.2)	37.0 (98.6)	37.8 (100.0)	36.6 (97.9)	37.0 (98.6)	36.8 (98.2)	36.9 (98.4)	39.8 (103.6)	39.8 (103.6)	38.8 (101.8)	39.8 (103.6)	37.3 (99.1)	39.8 (103.6)
Mean daily maximum °C (°F)	32.0 (89.6)	31.8 (89.2)	32.1 (89.8)	32.2 (90.0)	32.0 (89.6)	32.5 (90.5)	33.3 (91.9)	34.2 (93.6)	34.0 (93.2)	33.6 (92.5)	33.1 (91.6)	32.3 (90.1)	32.8 (91.0)
Daily mean °C (°F)	26.3 (79.3)	26.3 (79.3)	26.5 (79.7)	26.6 (79.9)	26.5 (79.7)	26.4 (79.5)	26.7 (80.1)	27.0 (80.6)	27.2 (81.0)	27.2 (81.0)	27.0 (80.6)	26.6 (79.9)	26.7 (80.1)
Mean daily minimum °C (°F)	22.8 (73.0)	22.9 (73.2)	22.9 (73.2)	22.9 (73.2)	22.8 (73.0)	22.1 (71.8)	21.8 (71.2)	22.1 (71.8)	22.7 (72.9)	23.0 (73.4)	23.1 (73.6)	23.0 (73.4)	22.7 (72.9)
Record low °C (°F)	13.4 (56.1)	13.6 (56.5)	14.0 (57.2)	13.6 (56.5)	9.4 (48.9)	11.0 (51.8)	11.5 (52.7)	12.0 (53.6)	13.8 (56.8)	13.0 (55.4)	14.2 (57.6)	14.0 (57.2)	9.4 (48.9)
Average precipitation mm (inches)	319.7 (12.59)	347.9 (13.70)	327.3 (12.89)	315.9 (12.44)	210.3 (8.28)	101.0 (3.98)	48.6 (1.91)	60.5 (2.38)	104.9 (4.13)	199.6 (7.86)	220.5 (8.68)	266.7 (10.50)	2,522.9 (99.33)
Average precipitation days (≥ 1.0 mm)	20	19	20	19	17	10	6	6	9	13	14	18	171
Average relative humidity (%)	87.9	87.8	87.8	87.7	87.6	85.2	81.7	81.4	81.9	83.3	84.9	87.0	85.4
Mean monthly sunshine hours	106.9	87.5	93.5	110.9	135.8	182.4	232.8	186.6	156.5	143.5	134.4	112.3	1,683.1
Source 1: Instituto Nacional de Meteorologia
Source 2: Meteo Climat (record highs and lows)

== Economy ==
The main source of income of the population comes in part from agricultural production, mainly from the cultivation of bananas, watermelon and the production of flour, other sources come from commerce and jobs generated by the city and state. Santo Antônio de Matupi is a major centre of logging in the region. Industries: bakeries, potteries, sawmills, carpentry, joinery, ice factory, metalwork, crusher and an asphalt company.

== Transportation ==
The city is served by Manicoré Airport.
