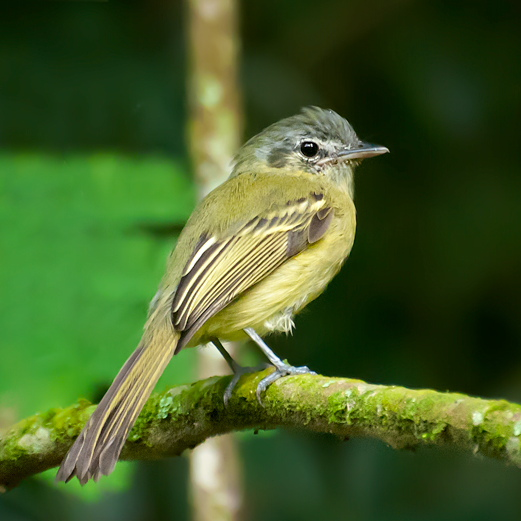
- Nominate subspecies in São Paulo, Brazil.

Conservation status
- Least Concern (IUCN 3.1)

Scientific classification
- Kingdom: Animalia
- Phylum: Chordata
- Class: Aves
- Order: Passeriformes
- Family: Tyrannidae
- Genus: Tolmomyias
- Species: T. sulphurescens

Binomial name
- Tolmomyias sulphurescens (Spix, 1825)

= Yellow-olive flatbill =

Species of bird

The yellow-olive flatbill or yellow-olive flycatcher (Tolmomyias sulphurescens) is a species of bird in the family Tyrannidae, the tyrant flycatchers. It is found in Mexico, in every Central American country, on Trinidad, and in every mainland South American country except Chile.

== Taxonomy and systematics ==
The yellow-olive flatbill has these 16 subspecies:

- T. s. cinereiceps (Sclater, PL, 1859)
- T. s. flavoolivaceus (Lawrence, 1863)
- T. s. berlepschi (Hartert, EJO & Goodson, 1917)
- T. s. exortivus (Bangs, 1908)
- T. s. asemus (Bangs, 1910)
- T. s. confusus Zimmer, JT, 1939
- T. s. duidae Zimmer, JT, 1939
- T. s. aequatorialis (Berlepsch & Taczanowski, 1884)
- T. s. cherriei (Hartert, EJO & Goodson, 1917)
- T. s. peruvianus (Taczanowski, 1875)
- T. s. insignis Zimmer, JT, 1939
- T. s. mixtus Zimmer, JT, 1939
- T. s. inornatus Zimmer, JT, 1939
- T. s. pallescens (Hartert, EJO & Goodson, 1917)
- T. s. grisescens (Chubb, C, 1910)
- T. s. sulphurescens (Spix, 1825)

Since the late twentieth century several authors have suggested that what is now considered a single species is actually several species, perhaps as many as 12. In particular, subspecies T. s. cinereiceps and T. s. flavoolivaceus are suggested as species, and they do not appear to be the closest relatives of the other 14 subspecies. Some authors consider several of the South American subspecies to be "dubious".

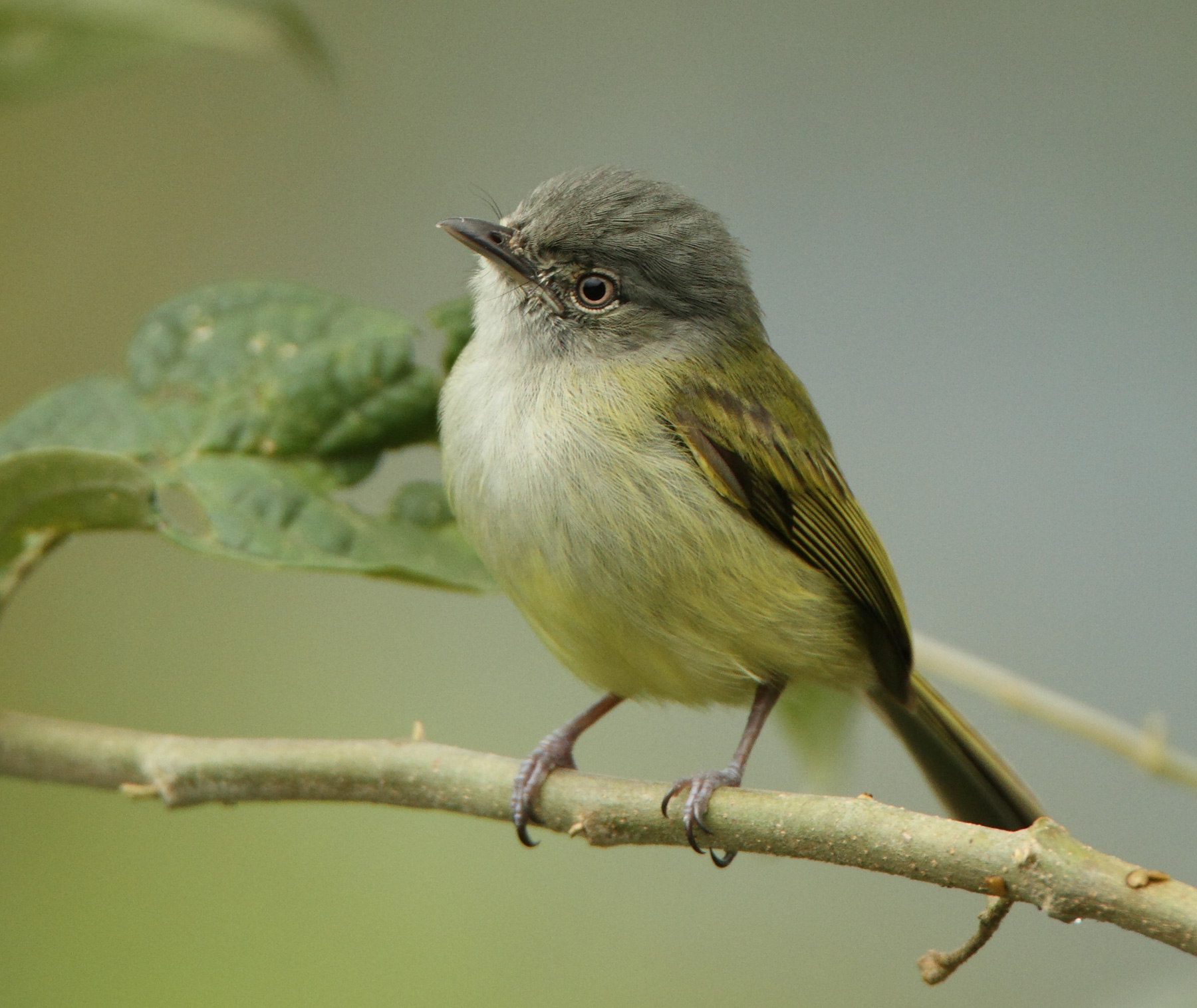
Turrialba, Costa Rica

== Description ==
The yellow-olive flatbill is 12.5 to 14 cm (4.9 to 5.5 in) long and weighs 14.5 to 15.2 g (0.51 to 0.54 oz). The sexes have the same plumage. Adults of the nominate subspecies T. s. sulphurescens have a dark olive crown and nape, a thin white band above the lores, a thin white eye-ring, and pale olive ear coverts with a dusky patch at their rear. Their upperparts are olive-green. Their wings are dusky or blackish with yellowish-olive edges on the wing coverts that form two wing bars. Their remiges have yellowish edges. Their tail is brownish to dusky with buffy edges on the feathers. Their throat is pale greenish gray, their breast and flanks grayish greenish olive, and their belly and undertail coverts are bright yellow. They have a variable pale brown to pale gray iris, a wide flat bill with a black maxilla and a pale gray to pale pinkish mandible, and gray legs and feet. Juveniles have paler underparts than adults with a broken eye-ring and a dark iris.

The other subspecies of the yellow-olive flatbill differ from the nominate and each other thus:

- T. s. cinereiceps: light gray crown, no dusky mark behind the ear coverts, pale gray cheeks and throat, pale yellow belly, and pale gray or whitish to pale yellow iris
- T. s. flavoolivaceus: smaller dusky facial mark and greener throat than nominate
- T. s. exortivus: slightly gray olive crown, gray chin, dull olive breast, and medium-yellow belly
- T. s. berlepschi: much like exortivus with slightly duller yellow belly
- T. s. asemus: gray crown, gray throat and breast, and paler yellow belly than nominate
- T. s. confusus: medium gray crown, dull olive breast, and medium-yellow belly
- T. s. cherriei: much like exortivus with slightly duller yellow belly
- T. s. duidae: similar to cherriei with darker olive crown and breast
- T. s. aequatorialis: dark gray crown, dull yellow-green breast, and dark iris
- T. s. peruvianus: dark gray crown, large facial patch, pale gray-green throat, dull olive breast, and dark iris
- T. s. insignis: olive-gray crown; duller underparts than peruvianus
- T. s. mixtus: darker crown than nominate and medium-yellow belly
- T. s. inornatus: very like insignis but less olive crown, less apparent facial mark, and paler underparts
- T. s. pallescens: darker olive crown, paler cheeks, brighter green upperparts, and greener breast than nominate; grayish iris
- T. s. grisescens: darker olive crown, paler cheeks, brighter green upperparts, and greener breast than nominate; grayish iris

== Distribution and habitat ==
The subspecies of the yellow-olive flatbill are found thus:

- T. s. cinereiceps: from southern Veracruz, northern Oaxaca, and the Yucatán Peninsula in southern Mexico south on both the Caribbean and Pacific slopes into Costa Rica and on the Pacific slope beyond into western Panama
- T. s. flavoolivaceus: Panama from Chiriquí Province on the Pacific slope and Colón Province on the Caribbean south into northwestern Colombia's Bolívar Department
- T. s. berlepschi: Trinidad
- T. s. exortivus: from Sucre Department in northeastern Colombia east into Venezuela north of the Orinoco River to Sucre and Monagas states
- T. s. asemus: Colombia from Chocó Department south to southwestern Cauca Department in the west and more centrally in the upper Cauca River and Magdalena River valleys in southern Huila Department
- T. s. confusus: from Táchira and western Apure states in southwestern Venezuela west in Colombia to the upper Magdalena Valley and south along the eastern slope of Colombia's Eastern Andes into northeastern Ecuador as far as western Sucumbíos and Napo provinces
- T. s. duidae: from Amazonas and southern Bolívar states in southern Venezuela into northern Amazonas state in northwestern Brazil
- T. s. aequatorialis: from Esmeraldas Province in northeastern Ecuador south through the country's west into northern Peru's Tumbes and Piura departments
- T. s. cherriei: from Delta Amacuro and Bolívar states in eastern Venezuela east through the Guianas and northern Brazil from the upper Branco River to the Atlantic in Amapá
- T. s. peruvianus: from southeastern Ecuador's Morona-Santiago Province south through central Peru to Junín Department
- T. s. insignis: south of the Amazon from Loreto Department in northeastern Peru east through northwestern Brazil to the Madeira River and north of the Amazon in Brazil from the lower Negro River east to the Nhamundá River
- T. s. mixtus: eastern Pará and northwestern Maranhão in northeastern Brazil
- T. s. inornatus: Puno Department in southeastern Peru
- T. s. pallescens: Brazil roughly bounded by southern Maranhão, Paraíba, and Bahia states in the north and east, and south and west through Mato Grosso and south through eastern Bolivia into northwestern Argentina as far as Tucumán Province
- T. s. grisescens: from central Paraguay south through Argentina's eastern Formosa and Chaco provinces into northern Santa Fe Province
- T. s. sulphurescens: from eastern Minas Gerais and Espírito Santo states in southeastern Brazil south through eastern Paraguay into northeastern Argentina's Misiones Province and slightly into far northern Uruguay

The yellow-olive flatbill inhabits a wide variety of forest landscapes including rainforest, montane forest, deciduous and semi-deciduous woodlands, secondary forest, and gallery forest. It usually does not inhabit humid lowland forest. Subspecies T. s. insignis is most often found on river islands and the nearby mainland. In elevation the species ranges up to 1,850 m (6,100 ft) in northern Central America but is usually below 1,550 m (5,100 ft) there. It reaches 1,200 m (3,900 ft) in Mexico, 1,400 m (4,600 ft) in Costa Rica, and 1,800 m (5,900 ft) in Colombia and western Ecuador. In Venezuela it reaches 1,900 m (6,200 ft) north of the Orinoco River and 1,500 m (4,900 ft) south of it. In eastern Ecuador it ranges between 700 and 1,700 m (2,300 and 5,600 ft), in northern Peru between 400 and 1,675 m (1,300 and 5,500 ft), and east of the Andes in Peru between 1,000 and 2,400 m (3,300 and 7,900 ft).

== Behavior ==
=== Movement ===
The yellow-olive flatbill is a year-round resident.

=== Feeding ===
The yellow-olive flatbill primarily feeds on insects and also includes small berries in its diet. It typically forages singly or in pairs and often joins mixed-species feeding flocks. It tends to be sluggish, peering slowly around and up from a perch in the understory. It usually captures prey in the understory to mid-story though sometimes in the crown, gleaning while perched, with outward or upward sallies to snatch or hover-glean it from leaves and twigs, and occasionally in mid-air. It typically lands on a different perch after a sally.

=== Breeding ===
The yellow-olive flatbill's breeding season has not been fully defined but includes April to June in Costa Rica, April to July on Trinidad, and January to June in northern Colombia. Its nest is a pear-shaped bag with a tube entrance that slopes up to the nest. It is made from rootlets, fungal rhizomorphs, grass, and spider web. Nests have been noted hanging from a branch or vine 1.5 and 11 m (5 and 36 ft) above the ground. The nests are often on the forest edge (natural or roadside) or over a stream, and are also often near a wasp nest. Adults roost in the nest outside the breeding season. The clutch is two or three eggs. In Costa Rica the incubation period is 17 to 18 days and fledging occurs 22 to 24 days after hatch. The female alone incubates the clutch and broods nestlings; both parents provision nestlings.

=== Vocalization ===
The yellow-olive flatbill's song varies widely among the subspecies. That of T. s. cinereiceps is a "series of 4 thin insectlike buzzes, zeee-Zeee-Zeee-ZEEEE!" and its call a "shrill, sibilant tssssp". In western Ecuador T. s. aequatorialis sings "a thin and well-enunciated series of quick notes, 'psee-pset-pset-pset' ". In northern Venezuela T. s. exortivus gives a "buzzy bzz...bzzz...bzzzzz,bzzzzz". T. s. peruvianus sings a "series of high, rising, sharp TSREET! notes, T. s. insignis "a short series of relatively high-pitched, broad amplitude notes, chit chit chit chit", and T. s. pallescens a "short series of whistles, each note 'sweeping' upward in pitch, swe swee swee".

== Status ==
The IUCN has assessed the yellow-olive flatbill as being of Least Concern. It has an extremely large range; its estimated population of at least five million mature individuals is believed to be decreasing. No immediate threats have been identified. It is considered overall fairly common to abundant, fairly common in northern Central America, Colombia, Peru, and Venezuela, and common in Costa Rica. It occurs in many protected areas and because of its "tolerance of wide variety of wooded habitats, including converted habitat, and its large range, this species is considered unlikely to become threatened in near future".
