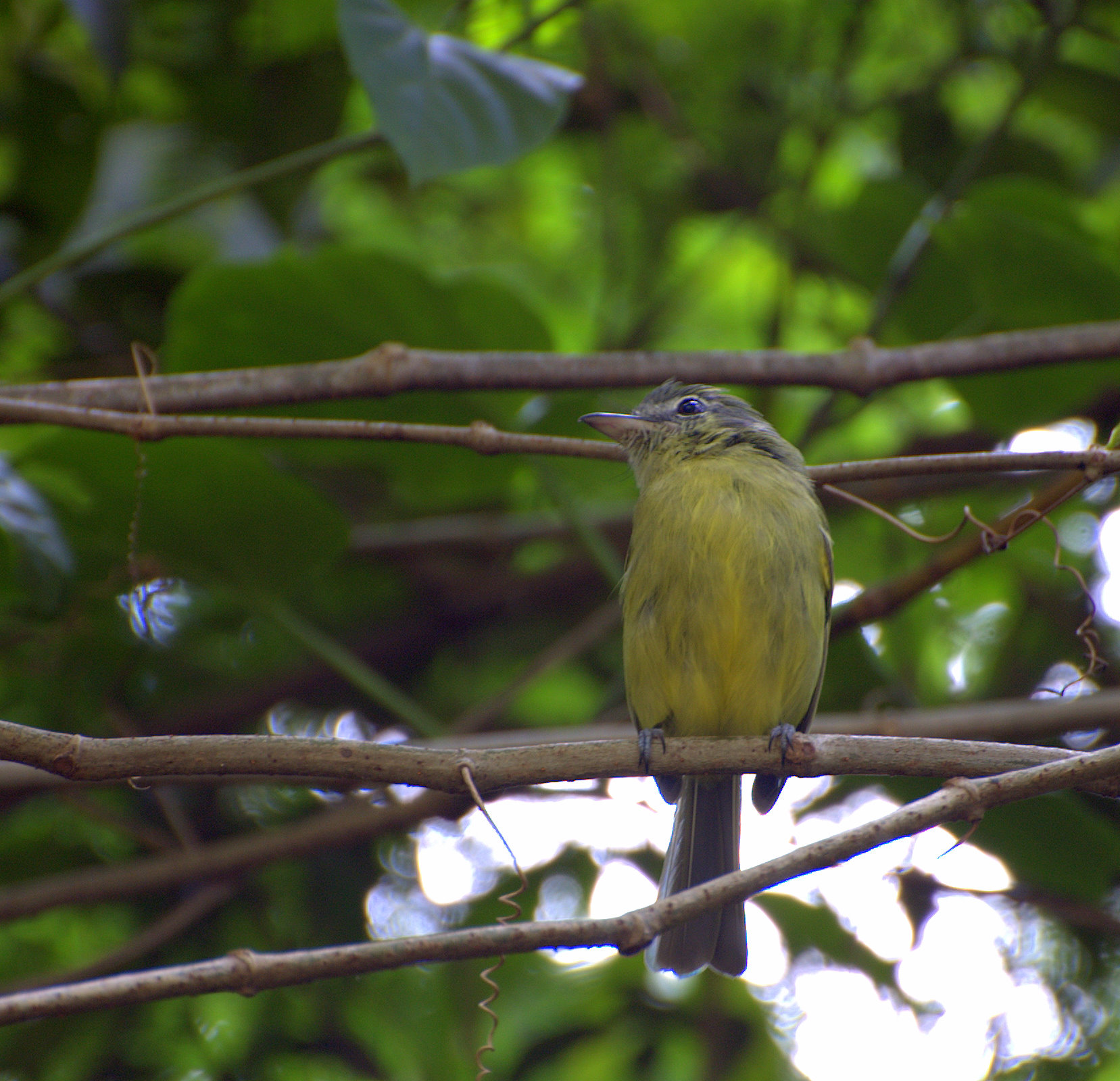
- Yellow-olive flatbill (Tolmomyias sulphurescens)

Scientific classification
- Kingdom: Animalia
- Phylum: Chordata
- Class: Aves
- Order: Passeriformes
- Family: Tyrannidae
- Genus: Tolmomyias; Hellmayr, 1927

Type species
- Platyrhynchus sulphurescens Spix, 1825

= Tolmomyias =

Genus of birds

Tolmomyias is a genus of Neotropical birds in the tyrant flycatcher family Tyrannidae. It is one of the two genera containing the "flatbills"; the other is Rhynchocyclus.

== Taxonomy ==
The genus Tolmomyias was introduced in 1927 by the Austrian ornithologist Carl Eduard Hellmayr with Platyrhynchus sulphurescens Spix, 1825, the yellow-olive flatbill, as the type species. The genus name Tolmomyias combines the Ancient Greek tolma "courage" or "boldness" with the Neo-Latin myias "flycatcher".

These species are notoriously difficult to identify, except by voice. Their taxonomy is complex and it is likely that some "species" actually include several species level taxa. They are relatively thickset birds with proportionally large heads and, as suggested by their name, flat bills. All have a primarily yellow-green plumage with distinct edging to the wings, and the crown is often grey. They are usually found in humid forests where they forage well above the forest floor and will join mixed flocks. Their bag-shaped nests are often placed near wasp nests.

== Species ==
The genus contains seven species:

Image	Common name	Scientific Name	Distribution
	Yellow-olive flatbill	Tolmomyias sulphurescens	Central and South America
	Orange-eyed flatbill	Tolmomyias traylori	south-eastern Colombia, eastern Ecuador, and north-eastern Peru.
	Yellow-margined flatbill	Tolmomyias assimilis	southern Central America, and the Chocó and Amazon in South America.
	Yellow-winged flatbill	Tolmomyias flavotectus	north west Ecuador, Colombia, Panama and Costa Rica.
	Grey-crowned flatbill	Tolmomyias poliocephalus	Amazon and Atlantic forests
	Ochre-lored flatbill	Tolmomyias flaviventris	Colombia and Venezuela, south to Peru, Peru, Bolivia, and Brazil, and on both Trinidad and Tobago.
	Olive-faced flatbill	Tolmomyias viridiceps	Western Amazonia.
