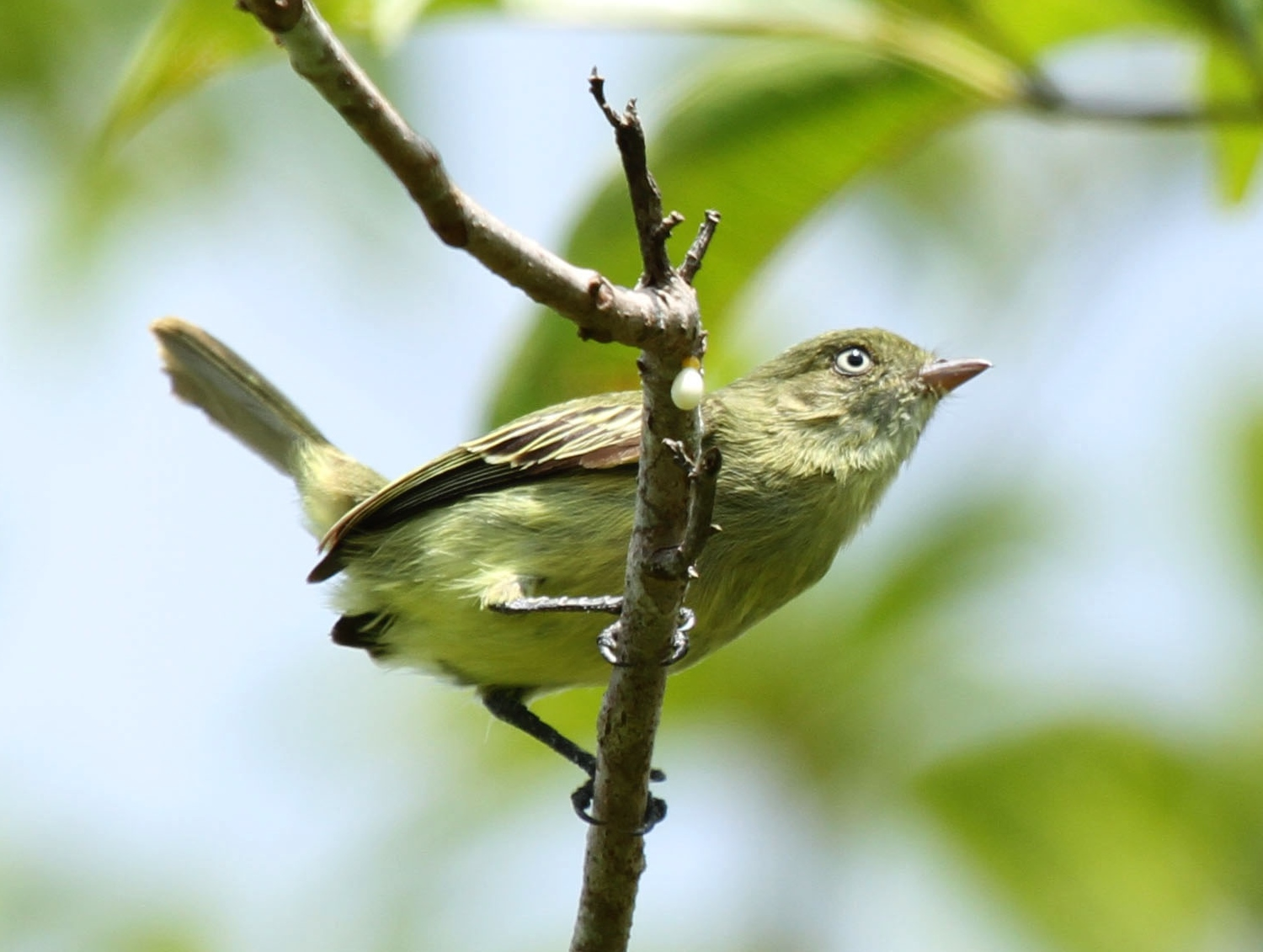

Conservation status
- Near Threatened (IUCN 3.1)

Scientific classification
- Kingdom: Animalia
- Phylum: Chordata
- Class: Aves
- Order: Passeriformes
- Family: Tyrannidae
- Genus: Zimmerius
- Species: Z. chicomendesi

Binomial name
- Zimmerius chicomendesi Whitney, Schunck, Rêgo, MA & Silveira, 2013

= Chico's tyrannulet =

Species of bird

Chico's tyrannulet (Zimmerius chicomendesi) is a Near Threatened species of passerine bird in the family Tyrannidae, the tyrant flycatchers. It is endemic to the area of Rio Madeirinha in Brazil.

== Taxonomy and systematics ==
Chico's tyrannulet was first described by the ornithologists Bret Whitney and colleagues in 2013 and given the binomial name Zimmerius chicomendesi. Its common name and specific epithet honor the Brazilian environmentalist Chico Mendes. Taxonomic systems began recognizing the new species in 2016.

Chico's tyrannulet is monotypic. It appears to be most closely related to the Mishana tyrannulet (Zimmerius villarejoi).

== Description ==
Chico's tyrannulet is about 10 cm (3.9 in) long; one male weighed 5.5 g (0.19 oz). The sexes have the same plumage; males are larger than females. Adults have an olive-green crown, back, and rump. Their face is slightly paler and more green. Their wings are dull blackish with a faint olive cast. The wing coverts have yellow edges and the secondaries and outer primaries have thinner yellow edges. Their tail is dull blackish with a faint olive cast. Their throat is pale green, their breast green washed with yellow, and their belly and undertail coverts bright yellow. They have a white iris, a brownish red maxilla, a reddish pink mandible, and blackish legs and feet.

== Distribution and habitat ==
Chico's tyrannulet is a bird of Amazonian Brazil. It is found in southeastern Amazonas state from east of the Madeira River to the Aripuanã and Madeirinha rivers. Its range might also extend further south into northeastern Rondônia and northwestern Mato Grosso. It inhabits campina woodland and scrubland, a biome characterized by poor, often sandy or rocky, soils and generally low vegetation. The canopy is usually lower than about 6 m (20 ft) but has scattered trees as tall as 10 m (33 ft).

== Behavior ==
=== Movement ===
Chico's tyrannulet is believed to be a year-round resident.

=== Feeding ===
As far as is known, Chico's tyrannulet feeds mostly if not exclusively on fruits, especially those of mistletoes (Loranthaceae). Others of its genus also feed on arthropods so it is assumed that Chico's tyrannulet does so as well. It appears to forage mainly in pairs.

=== Breeding ===
Nothing is known about the breeding biology of Chico's tyrannulet.

=== Vocalization ===
Chico's tyrannulet has at least four vocalizations, all made by both sexes, though recordings are sparse. The most commonly heard is a call, "a distinctly double-noted 'tweep-tweep' (occasionally single- or triple-noted), with variants and different inflections". What is thought to be its dawn song is a single "tweep" note repeated at intervals of three to five seconds. It also makes a "call series" and a "snarl"; the latter is "probably only used in agonistic interactions".

== Status ==
The IUCN has assessed Chico's tyrannulet as Near Threatened. It has a small range; its population size is not known and is believed to be decreasing. A principal threat is "[t]he development of the BR-230 road which goes through much of the campina habitat in this species's range, threatening this habitat. Development of this road may also involve quarrying for sand within the campina habitat, and once complete it will make the area more accessible for logging and agriculture." "Although part of the species' range is already nominally protected within the newly gazetted Campos Amazônicos National Park and some of the rest lie within indigenous territories, further protected areas should be declared within the distribution of both species, free from disturbance by road-building and other associated settlement activities."
