= Jair Candor =

Brazilian human rights activist (born 1960)

Jair Candor (born c. 1960) is a Brazilian human rights activist. A field agent for the Fundação Nacional dos Povos Indígenas (FUNAI), he is known for his work protecting uncontacted peoples living in the Amazon rainforest.

== Personal life ==
Candor's family moved to the Amazon during the 1960s after the Brazilian government offered plots of land to families to colonise the rainforest. After his mother died, Candor was adopted by a family of rubber tappers.

Candor was engaged in 1992, but did not attend the wedding due to an expedition running late. He later married and had two children.

== Activism ==
Candor first formed relationships with indigenous people when working on a farm in Ji-Paraná, Rondônia, where he met members of the Gavião community, with whom he provided with items like coffee and sugar. They later introduced Candor to agents from FUNAI, who employed him as a boat pilot.

Candor began working as a field agent for FUNAI in 1988, identifying isolated and uncontacted communities living in northwestern Mato Grosso. Through the role, Candor monitors groups to check whether they can carry out substinence activities such as hunting without interference. In 1988, he successfully made contact with the three surviving members of the Piripkura people, Tamandua, Pakyî, and Rita, who were living between Rondolândia and Colniza. Candor subsequently became the coordinator of the Madeirinha-Juruena Ethno-Environmental Protection Front, which annually carries out expeditions to verify that the Piripkura remain alive due to Brazilian law requiring proof that isolated and uncontacted groups exist before granting legal protections to the land they inhabit. In 2011, Candor made contact with a Cinta Larga family that had moved away from its group and began living in Mato Grosso. In 2018, Candor supported Paykî to access medical care for gallbladder issues. In 2019, alongside Bruno Pereira, Candor made successful contact with members of the Korubo people.

Candor has also campaigned against illegal logging and farming on land known to be used by uncontacted peoples, and has called on the Brazilian government to officially recognise demarcation of indigenous land. In 2007, FUNAI ordered Candor make contact with the Kawahiva people due to increasing risks from logging and farming; Candor's attempts were unsuccessful, with the group pelting him with rocks and chasing him from the footage. In 2011, Candor was able to record a Kawahiva family walking in the forest to prove their existence; in 2016, the Ministry of Justice and Public Security declared the area to be an indigenous territory. In June and July 2026, Candor officially demarcated 1 million acres of land as the Rio Pardo Kawahiva Territory; as of August 2026, the demarcation is yet to be signed into law by the President of Brazil, Luiz Inácio Lula da Silva.

In 2018, a group of men connected with loggers attacked the government base Candor was working in in the Amazon. During the shootout, one of the loggers was killed. Their leader was later arrested.

== Recognition ==
Candor's work with the Piripkura people was featured in the 2017 documentary Piripkura, directed by Mariana Oliva, Renata Terra, and Bruno Jorge. The film won the Human Rights Award at International Documentary Film Festival Amsterdam, and best documentary at Rio de Janeiro International Film Festival.

A radio documentary about Candor, entitled Searching for the Last Man in the Forest, aired on the BBC World Service in 2018.

Candor was recognised at the Brazil Conference in Cambridge, United States, for his work protecting indigenous communities and preserving the Amazon.

Candor was nominated for the Golden Butterfly human rights activism award by Amnesty International.
