= Kawahiva =

Brazilian uncontacted indigenous tribe

The Kawahiva, formerly called the Rio Pardo Indians, are an uncontacted Indigenous tribe who live near the city of Colniza in Mato Grosso, close to the Rio Pardo in the north of Mato Grosso, Brazil. They are usually on the move and have little contact with outsiders. Thus, they are known primarily from physical evidence they have left behind – arrows, baskets, hammocks, and communal houses.

Knowledge of the Kawahiva's modern existence dates to 1999, but it is possible the group dates back to the 1700s. Their survival has been threatened by deforestation, illegal logging, and attempts to kill or enslave them. In 2005, the Brazilian government launched an investigation into possible genocide of the Kawahiva, but ultimately no one was put on trial. The tribe's land has been under local protection since 2001, but the protection has periodically been removed by the courts only to be later reinstated. In 2012, the land was turned into an official reservation. In 2013, the government released video of the Kawahiva filmed in 2011, generating headlines around the world. This led to calls for the Kawahiva's lands to be marked out and protected. In 2016, following a campaign by Survival International, Brazil's Justice Minister signed a decree to protect the Kawahiva's territory but the demarcation stalled for many years. In 2024, Brazil’s Supreme Court ordered FUNAI, the Brazilian government’s Indigenous affairs department, to present a timetable for demarcation of the Kawahiva do Rio Pardo territory, and in March 2025, FUNAI confirmed that the demarcation will happen by the end of 2025.

== Culture ==
The Kawahiva people are an uncontacted Indigenous tribe of Brazil. They live in the area of the Rio Pardo of Mato Grosso, Brazil but because of constant threats from the outside world they are usually on the move. They have little contact with other indigenous groups and have rarely been seen by non-indigenous people. As such, the Kawahiva are known primarily from physical evidence they have left behind – arrows, baskets, hammocks, and sleeping mats. They live in communal shelters. They use a primitive spinning wheel to make string and make nets of tree bark. Neighboring tribes call the Kawahiva "Baixinhos" (tiny people) or "Cabeças vermelhas" (red heads).

The Kawahiva are a hunting and gathering society. They rely on temporary hunting camps, not staying in one place for very long. It is believed that loggers have intentionally tried to keep the Kawahiva on the run. Survival International, a group that campaigns for the rights of indigenous tribal peoples, speculates that women of the tribe have stopped giving birth. They appear to speak a version of Kagwahiva that varies in several ways from known versions.

== History ==
References to the Kawahiva date back to 1750, but it is unknown if the living Kawahiva people are their descendants, or if the modern Kawahiva are instead related to neighboring tribes. Regardless, they are believed to be descended from the Tupí. According to James S. Olson,"The Munduruku expansion (in the 18th century) dislocated and displaced the Kawahíb, breaking the tribe down into much smaller groups ". Rumors of a modern Kawahiva tribe date back as far as the 1980s, but the first definitive report of their existence came from loggers working in the area in 1999. Their continued existence has been threatened by deforestation, illegal logging, and attempts to kill or enslave them ever since.

In 2001, the National Indian Foundation of Brazil (FUNAI) secured legal protection for a 410,000-acre area designated the Rio Pardo Indigenous Area. The protection forbids anyone to enter the area, but was often ignored by logging and mining operations. The order was overturned in court only to be reinstated several times between 2001 and 2005. In March 2005, a judge again overturned the order protecting the Rio Pardo territory. Subsequently, FUNAI found abandoned villages believed to belong to the Kawahiva, complete with food, supplies, and hunting tools. Survival International said it received reports of heavily armed loggers attempting to track down and kill the Kawahiva. A high-profile campaign by FUNAI and Survival International was launched and attracted international attention. The judge overturned himself after an appeal by FUNAI in May.

In December 2005, 29 people were arrested by the Brazilian government for illegally encroaching on Kawahiva land. Those arrested included businessmen, loggers, and squatters, and were believed to be allied with local farmers. A federal investigation into the possible genocide of the Kawahiva was launched. Ninety arrest warrants were issued as part of the investigation, but ultimately no one was tried. The territory's legal protection later removed again, but was reinstated late in 2007. In 2012, the land was turned into an official reservation granting additional protection for the Kawahiva, but farmers and loggers wishing to develop the region remained hostile toward the tribe.

In August 2013, the Kawahiva made international headlines when the Brazilian government released video of the tribe filmed in 2011. It was recorded by Jair Candor, an employee of FUNAI for the past 20 years. In the video, a group of nine tribe members is talking while walking through the forest. They are all naked and the men carry bows and arrows. A woman with two children spots the camera, yells "tapuim" (enemy), and runs away. One man leaves the group to investigate, returning to the others when he is sure the cameraman poses no threat. According to linguist Ana Suely Arruda Cabral, the conversation is about finding a place to stop for the evening. It was the first time the Kawahiva had ever been seen on tape. Previously, they were known from pictures released in 2005 which showed members of the tribe cutting a tree.

According to the FUNAI, there exist at least four different bands of uncontacted Kawahiva. In 2016 the population for Kawahiva of the Rio Pardo was estimated at 15 individuals, and in 2024 at 35–40.
