= Pseudopaludicola hyleaustralis =

Conservation status
- Least Concern (IUCN 3.1)

Scientific classification
- Kingdom: Animalia
- Phylum: Chordata
- Class: Amphibia
- Order: Anura
- Family: Leptodactylidae
- Genus: Pseudopaludicola
- Species: P. hyleaustralis

Binomial name
- Pseudopaludicola hyleaustralis Pansonato, Morais, Ávila, Kawashita-Ribeiro, Strussmann, and Martins, 2012

Species of frog

Pseudopaludicola hyleaustralis is a species of frog in the family Leptodactylidae. It is endemic to Brazil.

== Habitat ==
This frog lives in dry savannah within primary rainforest. Scientists have seen these frogs in protected areas, including ESEC do Rio Roosevelt.

== Reproduction ==
The male frog perches on the ground or in shallow water and calls to the female frogs. The female frog deposits eggs in the water, in which the tadpoles develop.

== Threats ==
The IUCN classifies this species as least concern of extinction.

== Original description ==
- Pansonato A; Morais DH; Avila RW; Kawashita-Ribeiro RA; Struessmann, Martins IA (2012). "A new species of Pseudopaludicola Miranda-Ribeiro, 1926 (Anura: Leiperidae) from the state of Mato Grosso, Brazil, with comments on the geographic distribution of Pseudopaludicola canga Giaretta & Kokubum, 2003". Zootaxa. 3523: 49–58.
