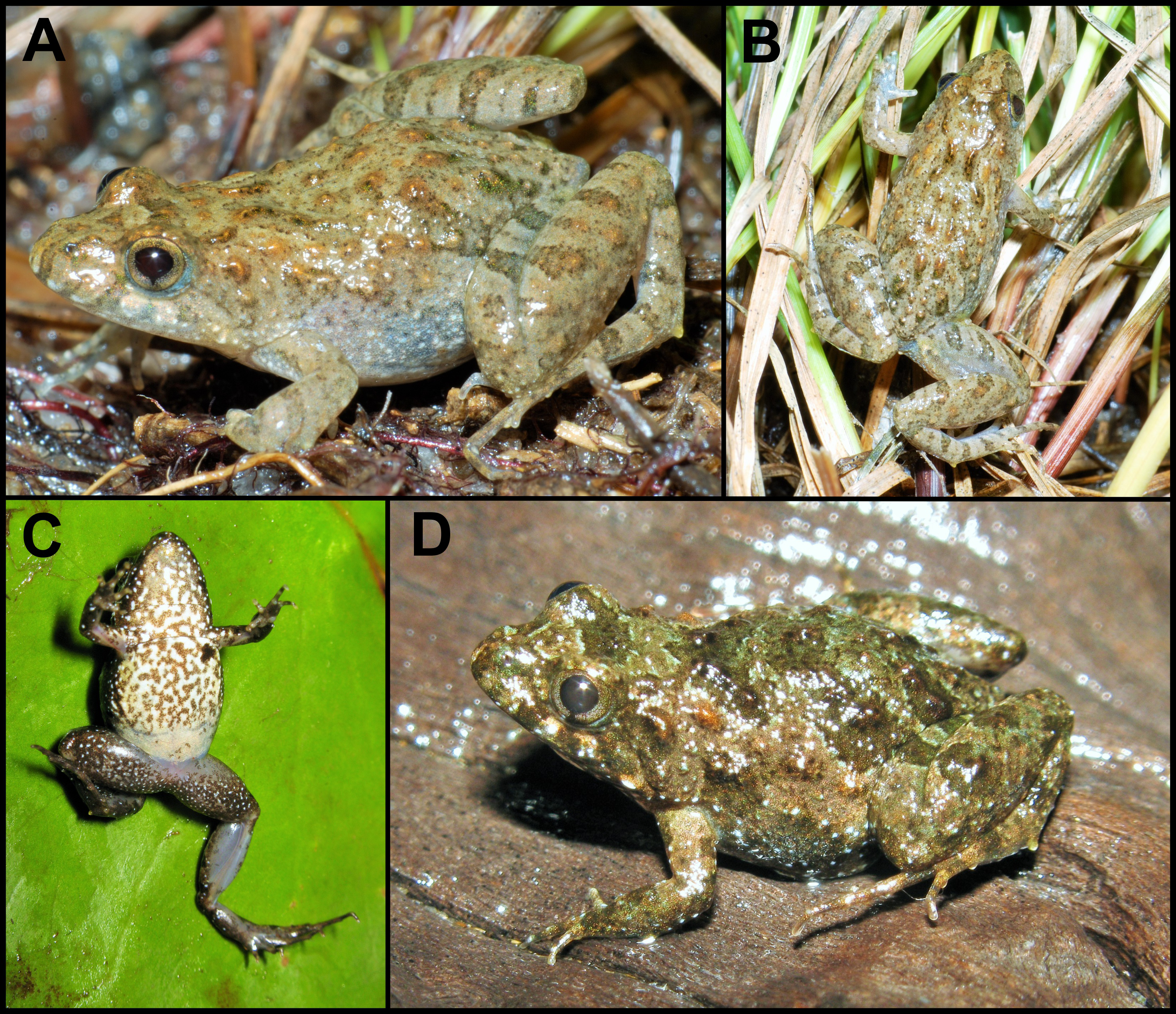
- Individuals found in Serra (A and B) and in Presidente Kennedy (C and D).

Conservation status
- Vulnerable (IUCN 3.1)

Scientific classification
- Kingdom: Animalia
- Phylum: Chordata
- Class: Amphibia
- Order: Anura
- Family: Leptodactylidae
- Genus: Pseudopaludicola
- Species: P. restinga

Binomial name
- Pseudopaludicola restinga Cardozo, Baldo, Pupin, Gasparini & Haddad, 2018
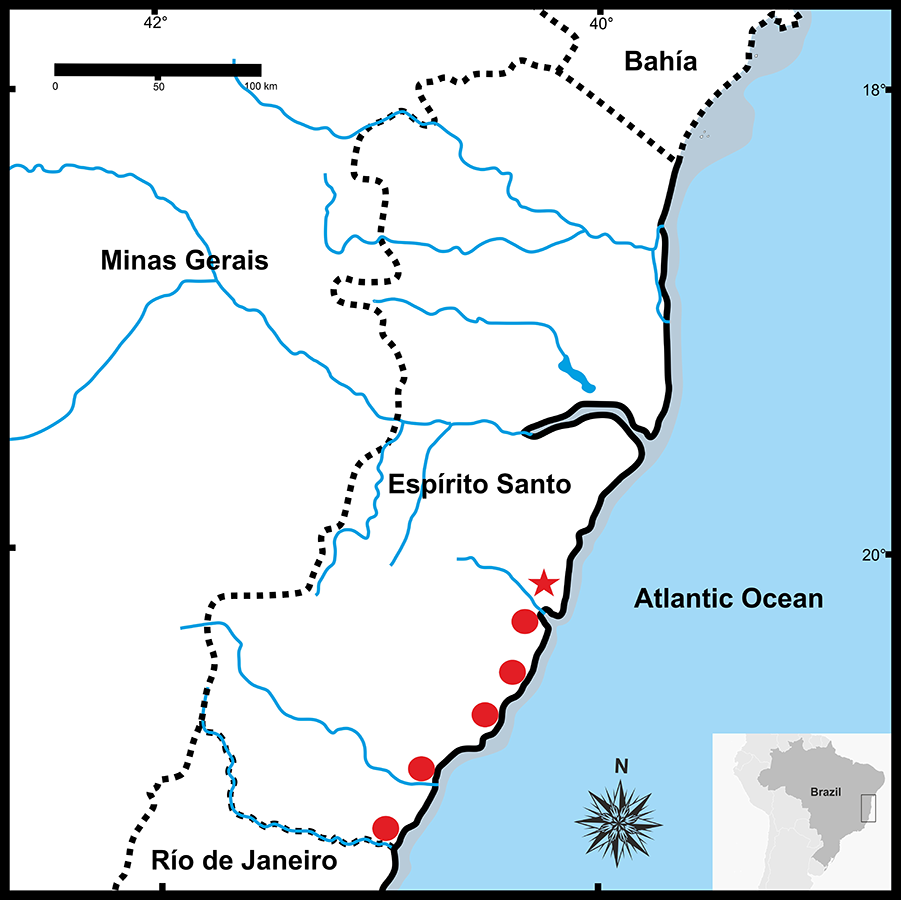
- The circles in red correspond to the cities where it is found and the star corresponds to the place where the holotype was found, in Espírito Santo.

= Pseudopaludicola restinga =

Species of frog

Pseudopaludicola restinga is a species of amphibian in the family Leptodactylidae, which is found in the coastal region of Espírito Santo, Brazil.

It can be differentiated from the other species of the genus Pseudopaludicola by a number of factors, such as its size, body shape, vocalization pattern, and number of chromosomes. Males have an average length between 11 and 14 millimeters, and females between 14 and 16 millimeters. Males vocalize during the night, right after long rains, with calls consisting of two pulses.

It was described on May 16, 2018, by a group of five researchers in the scientific journal PeerJ. Although it is only being described now, there were already reports of the species since 2011, where it was treated as Pseudopaludicola falcipes species affinis. Its specific epithet derives from the Portuguese word restinga, which designates the biome where it is found. It may be threatened by the creation of ports and by oil and natural gas exploration in the region and by general coastal development, including farms, pasturage, tourism infrastructure, and military installations.

== Taxonomy ==
The species was described in the scientific journal PeerJ on May 16, 2018, by researchers Dario Cardozo, Diego Baldo, Nadya Pupin, João Luiz Gasparin, and Célio Haddad. It is treated as belonging to the genus Pseudopaludicola due to its phylogenetic position and the presence of tubercles in the forearm, the absence of apophyses in the anterolateral region of the hyoid, but having them in a reduced form in the posterolateral region, and the presence of slightly overlapping cartilages in the epicoracoid. Speciation can be determined by a number of morphological factors, such as its size, behavioral factors, the frequency of its vocalization, and genetic factors, such as the number of diploid chromosomes. Analyses were also made of the 16S mitochondrial gene, which confirmed that this was indeed a new species.

The holotype, which was an adult male, was found on 17 February 2009 in the city of Serra, Espírito Santo, Brazil, at an altitude of 2 meters from sea level. More than 50 paratypes, including males, females and juveniles, were found and collected and observed in December 2017 in surrounding cities.

There had already been reports of the species since 2011, when a scientific article that sought to list the amphibians of Espírito Santo (Frogs of the state of Espírito Santo, southeastern Brazil - The need for looking at the 'coldspots'), treated it as a species affinis of Pseudopaludicola falcipes, being named by the authors of the article, Antonio de Padua Almeida, João Luiz Gasparini and Pedro Luiz Vieira Peloso, as Pseudopaludicola aff. falcipes. In 2012, Gasparini used the same nomenclature in his other article, Amphibians and Reptiles of Vitória and Greater Vitória, Espírito Santo.

Its specific epithet derives from the Portuguese word restinga, of uncertain origin, which designates a type of vegetation found near the coast that is used as habitat by the species.

== Distribution and conservation ==
Currently, there are only reports of the species in six cities in Espírito Santo: Serra, Guarapari, Vitória, Presidente Kennedy, Vila Velha, and Itapemirim. The local biome is restinga, and individuals can be found among dunes or on the edge of wet or flooded lagoons. The restingas, which are composed of herbaceous and marshy vegetation, are suffering destruction from anthropic actions, caused mainly by economic expansions, such as the use of the site for the creation of ports and exploration of oil and natural gas, which may endanger the local fauna. However, with the discovery of this new species, it is possible that environmental laws will be created to protect the sandbanks of Espírito Santo. It has not yet been evaluated by the International Union for Conservation of Nature (IUCN).

== Description ==
Its average length varies between 11.7 and 14.6 millimeters in males and between 14 and 16.7 in females. The length of its head is longer than its width, its snout is tapered when viewed dorsally and more prominent than the jaw when viewed laterally. The distance between the nostrils is slightly smaller than the eyes, and the eardrum is not visible. It has a developed vocal sac with a central fold, its loreal region is flat and its canthus rostralis is not noticeable. Its tongue is complete, oval, with a loose front part and a base without pigment. It has maxillary and premaxillary teeth. Its body is slender, with smooth skin and small flattened warts on the side of the body. Its belly is whitish, with black spots on the abdomen, throat, and thighs. Its upper limbs have 4 fingers, the last being the longest, and its lower limbs have 5 fingers, the fourth being the longest.

It can be differentiated from Pseudopaludicola falcipes by having an incomplete abdominal fold, and from P. hyleaustralis by the presence of protuberances on the eyebrow. It can also be differentiated from P. atragula by the fact that the latter has a reticulate vocal sac with a dark tone and no central folds. Some individuals may have variations in the coloration of the back, which can vary from brownish to dark brown. Another possible variation is in the amount of spots on the belly and their density, which can change from specimen to specimen. Despite these differences, there are usually not so many differences between different individuals.

== Vocalization ==
Males vocalize both during the day and at night, croaking at the edge of puddles after heavy rains. Their vocalization consists of a sequence of a single musical note with a double pulse without modulation, where each call lasts approximately 47 milliseconds and has an interval of 83.26 milliseconds, making 21.3 calls per second at a frequency of 4,592.32 hertz. Its vocalization can be differentiated from any other species because it is composed of doubly pulsed and separated notes.
