= Monte Santo =

Monte Santo may refer to the following places:

- Monte Santo, Bahia, a municipality in Bahia, Brazil
- Monte Santo de Minas, a municipality in Minas Gerais, Brazil
- Monte Santo do Tocantins, a municipality in Tocantins, Brazil
- Monte Santo (Siligo), a mountain in the region of Siligo, Sardinia, Italy
