= Pseudopaludicola ibisoroca =

Conservation status
- Vulnerable (IUCN 3.1)

Scientific classification
- Kingdom: Animalia
- Phylum: Chordata
- Class: Amphibia
- Order: Anura
- Family: Leptodactylidae
- Genus: Pseudopaludicola
- Species: P. ibisoroca

Binomial name
- Pseudopaludicola ibisoroca Pansonato, Veiga-Menoncello, Mudrek, Jansen, Recco-Pimentel, Martins, and Strüssmann, 2016

Species of frog

Pseudopaludicola ibisoroca is a species of frog in the family Leptodactylidae. It is endemic to Brazil.

== Habitat ==
This frog lives solely in wetlands dominated by shrub vegetation and clear water within Cerrado places.

Scientists have reported the frog from a protected place, Parque Nacional das Emas.

== Reproduction ==
This frog is an explosive breeder. The female frog deposits eggs in water, in which the free-swimming tadpoles develop. Unlike other frogs in Pseudopaludicola, this frog does not breed in many different types of water and requires its own specific habitat.

== Threats ==
The IUCN classifies this frog as vulnerable to extinction. It is subject to habitat loss and habitat fragmentation. People convert the Cerrado to farmland, including soybean monoculture, and livestock pasturage. When Cerrado is converted to farmland, the animals drink the water in the wetlands and cause erosion that creates gullies and ravines. When Cerrado is converted to farmland, the farmers use pesticides and fertilizers that can affect the frog. People also set fires to facilitate land conversion.

== Original description ==
- Pansonato A. Veiga-Menoncello; Mudrek JR; Jansen M; Recco-Pimentel SM; Mrtins IA; Struessmann C (2016). "Two new species of Pseudopaludicola Miranda-Ribeiro, 1926 (Anura: Leptodactylidae: :eiuperinae) from eastern Bolivia and western Brazil". Herpetologica. 72: 235–255.
