= Pseudopaludicola pocoto =

Conservation status
- Least Concern (IUCN 3.1)

Scientific classification
- Kingdom: Animalia
- Phylum: Chordata
- Class: Amphibia
- Order: Anura
- Family: Leptodactylidae
- Genus: Pseudopaludicola
- Species: P. pocoto

Binomial name
- Pseudopaludicola pocoto Magalhães, Loebmann, Kokubum, Haddad, and Garda, 2014

Species of frog

Pseudopaludicola pocoto is a species of frog in the family Leptodactylidae. It is endemic to Brazil.

== Habitat ==
This frog lives in Caatinga biomes, in dry savannah, dry shrubland, and shallow bodies of water with grassy vegetation. It can also live in cow pasture and has shown some tolerance to anthropogenic disturbance.

The frog's known range overlaps with some protected areas: Estação Ecológica de Seridó, Parque Municipal da Serra das Almas, and Reserva Particular do Patrimônio Natural (RPPN) Maurício Dantas.

== Reproduction ==
The male frog sits near shallow, pools of water that are not there all year. He calls to the female frogs at dusk and at night. The tadpoles live near the edges of shallow ponds with only a few plants. They hide in the mud.

== Threats ==
The IUCN classifies this species as least concern.

== Original description ==
- Magalhaes FDM; Loebmann D; Kokubum MNDC; Haddad CFB; Garda AA (2014). "A new species of Pseudopaludicola (Anura: Leptodactylicae: Leiuperinae) from northeastern Brazil". Herpetologica. 70: 77–88.
