= Pseudopaludicola atragula =

Conservation status
- Least Concern (IUCN 3.1)

Scientific classification
- Kingdom: Animalia
- Phylum: Chordata
- Class: Amphibia
- Order: Anura
- Family: Leptodactylidae
- Genus: Pseudopaludicola
- Species: P. atragula

Binomial name
- Pseudopaludicola atragula Pansonato, Mudrek, Veiga-Menoncello, Rossa-Feres, Martins, and Strüssmann, 2014

Species of frog

Pseudopaludicola atragula is a species of frog in the family Leptodactylidae. It is endemic to Brazil.

== Habitat ==
This frog is found in humid habitats within the Cerrado biome, near places where groundwater upwelling creates temporary and permanent ponds and in swamps with many herbaceous plants. It has shown some tolerance to anthropogenic disturbance, often found in pastures, watering holes, and cattle footprints. Scientists have seen it between 400 and 600 m (1,300 and 2,000 ft) above sea level.

== Reproduction ==
The male frog sits and calls to the female frogs. The female frog deposits her eggs in still water. The tadpoles swim in the water.

== Threats ==
The IUCN classifies this frog as least concern of extinction. In some areas, it is subject to habitat loss associated with large-scale agriculture, dam construction, and fires.

== Original description ==
- Pasonato A; Mudrek JR; Veiga-Menoncello ACP; Rossa-Feres DdC; Martins IA; Struessmann C. (2014). "A new specides of Pseudopaludicola Miranda-Ribeiro, 1926 (Anura: Leptodactylidae: Leiuperinae) from northwestern state of Sao Paulo, Brazil". Zootaxa. 3861: 249–264.
