= Pseudopaludicola florencei =

Conservation status
- Least Concern (IUCN 3.1)

Scientific classification
- Kingdom: Animalia
- Phylum: Chordata
- Class: Amphibia
- Order: Anura
- Family: Leptodactylidae
- Genus: Pseudopaludicola
- Species: P. florencei

Binomial name
- Pseudopaludicola florencei Andrade, Haga, Lyra, Leite, Kwet, Haddad, Toledo, and Giaretta, 2018

Species of frog

Pseudopaludicola florencei is a species of frog in the family Leptodactylidae. It is endemic to Brazil in Minas Gerais.

== Habitat ==
This frog is found on the leaf litter in Caatinga and Atlantic forest habitats. It can live in grassy areas, shrubland, and forests. It has shown some tolerance to anthropogenic disturbance and has been seen in altered areas, such as open forests and pasture. Scientists have seen it between 0 and 10 m (0 and 33 ft) above sea level.

There are protected places within the frog's range, such as Área de Preservação Ambiental Marimbus-Iraquara.

== Reproduction ==
This species breeds through larval development.

== Threats ==
Scientists from the IUCN say this frog is vulnerable to extinction.

== Original description ==
- Andrade FS; Haga IA; Lyra ML; Leite FSF; Kwet A; Haddad CFB; Toledo LF; Giaretta AA (2018). "A new species of Pseudopaludicola Miranda-Ribeiro (Anura: Leptodactylidae: Leiuperinae) from eastern Brazil, with novel data on the advertisement call of Pseudopaludicola falcipes (Hensel)". Zootaxa. 4433: 71–100. doi:10.11646/zootaxa.4433.1.4. PMID 30313239.
