= Pseudopaludicola ceratophyes =

Leticia swamp frog

Conservation status
- Least Concern (IUCN 3.1)

Scientific classification
- Kingdom: Animalia
- Phylum: Chordata
- Class: Amphibia
- Order: Anura
- Family: Leptodactylidae
- Genus: Pseudopaludicola
- Species: P. ceratophyes

Binomial name
- Pseudopaludicola ceratophyes Rivero and Serna, 1985

Synonyms
- Pseudopaludicola ceratophryes (misspelling)

Species of frog

Pseudopaludicola ceratophyes is a species of frog in the family Leptodactylidae. The common name Leticia swamp frog has been coined for it, after its type locality, Leticia in Amazonas, Colombia. It is found in extreme southernmost Colombia (the type locality), northeastern Peru (Loreto Region), and adjacent western Brazil.

== Description ==
The holotype, a gravid female, measured 13 mm (0.51 in) in snout–vent length. The upper eyelids carry horn-like, elongate tubercles. The toes are approximately ⅓ webbed; the unwebbed portions bear lateral fringes.

== Habitat and conservation ==
Pseudopaludicola ceratophyes is a locally abundant leaf-litter species inhabiting primary flooding forest with closed canopy, possibly also more open/edge areas. The altitudinal range is 100–300 m (330–980 ft) above sea level. The eggs are deposited in shallow pools. It is locally affected by habitat loss.
