= Mata do Bacurizal e do Lago Caraparu Ecological Reserve =

- Reserva Ecológica da Mata do Bacurizal e do Lago Caraparu
- Location within Brazil
- Nearest city: Salvaterra, Pará
- Coordinates: 0°46′19″S 48°31′03″W
- Designation: Ecological reserve
- Administrator: Municipality of Salvaterra, Pará

The Mata do Bacurizal e do Lago Caraparu Ecological Reserve (Portuguese: Reserva Ecológica da Mata do Bacurizal e do Lago Caraparu) is a municipal ecological reserve in the state of Pará, Brazil.

== Location ==
The Mata do Bacurizal e do Lago Caraparu Ecological Reserve is in the municipality of Salvaterra, in the northeastern portion of the island of Marajó in the state of Pará. The reserve is just 2 kilometres (1.2 mi) from the municipal seat, and includes the Bacurizal Forest and Lake Caraparu on the shore of the Bay of Marajó. The lake has dark waters, and empties into Marajó Bay. It was created to protect the coastal environment, to preserve natural resources, support scientific research, environmental education and ecotourism, while allowing the traditional fishing communities to make sustainable use of the resources. The ecological reserve is managed by technicians and environmentalists of the municipal prefecture of Salvaterra. The municipality is contained in the 59,985 square kilometres (23,160 sq mi) Marajó Archipelago Environmental Protection Area, a sustainable use conservation unit established in 1989 to protect the environment of the delta region.

== Environment ==
The forest has a well-preserved environment that includes many examples of local flora and fauna, including the bacurizeiro tree, after which it is named. This tree is of considerable economic value for its fruit and its fine wood used in furniture making. The forest has many trails giving access to the mangroves, the Tapera Campina fishing port and the São João beach. The interior of the forest, with its many tall trees, is dark, cool and damp. The local people extract seeds, roots and sap for medicinal purposes. There are diverse fauna including various types of primate, many birds, and fish and crabs in the mangrove waters. The reserve is important as an area for feeding and reproduction of many migratory birds, including the endangered scarlet ibis (Eudocimus ruber).

== Sources ==
- APA Arquipélago do Marajó (in Portuguese), ISA: Instituto Socioambiental
- Giovanni Salera Júnior (24 August 2012), "Reserva Ecológica da Mata do Bacurizal e do Lago Caraparu", Mesa de Bar News (476), Gurupi – Estado do Tocantins.
