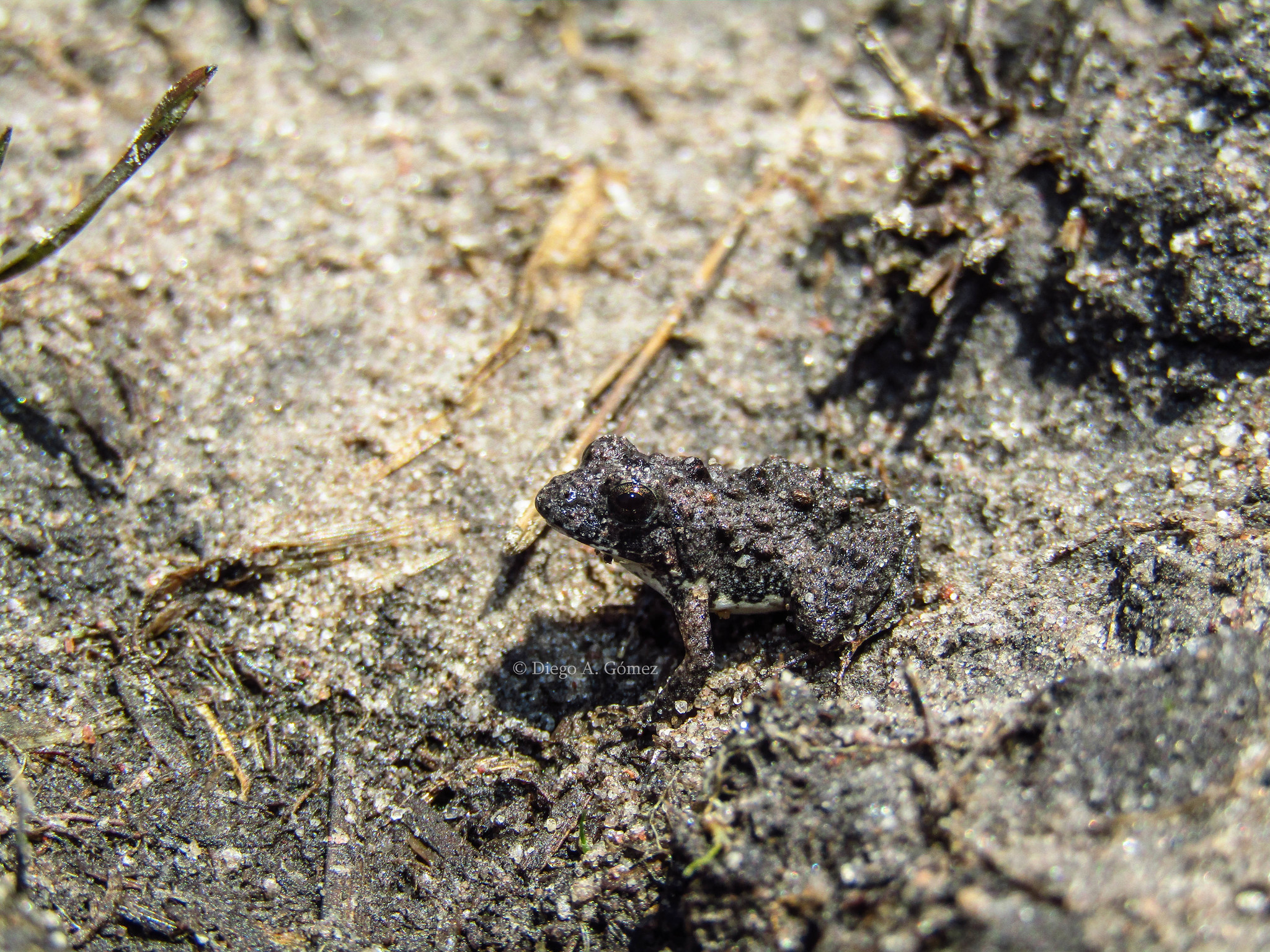

Conservation status
- Least Concern (IUCN 3.1)

Scientific classification
- Kingdom: Animalia
- Phylum: Chordata
- Class: Amphibia
- Order: Anura
- Family: Leptodactylidae
- Genus: Pseudopaludicola
- Species: P. boliviana

Binomial name
- Pseudopaludicola boliviana Parker, 1927
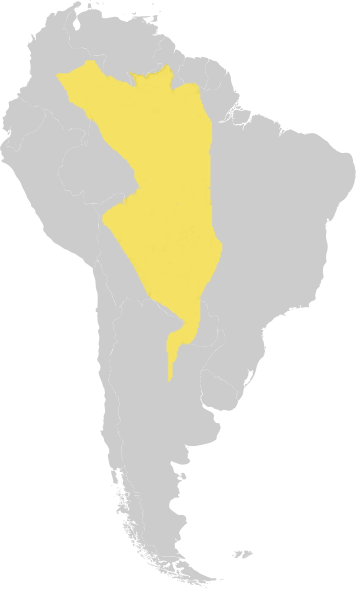

Synonyms
- Pseudopaludicola mirandae Mercadal de Barrio and Barrio, 1994

= Pseudopaludicola boliviana =

Species of frog

Pseudopaludicola boliviana is a species of frog in the family Leptodactylidae. It is found in Argentina, Bolivia, Brazil, Colombia, Guyana, Paraguay, Suriname, and Venezuela.

== Habitat ==
This terrestrial frog lives in several types of habitats: Cerrado, Chiquitano forest, other forest, moist savanna, swamps, and pastureland. Scientists have seen it between 0 and 700 m (0 and 2,297 ft) above sea level. This species has been reported from protected areas.

== Diet ==
Pseudopaludicola boliviana demonstrate a high dietary plasticity with minimal variation between sexes. Their diet consists primarily of Coleoptera, Diptera, and Acari.

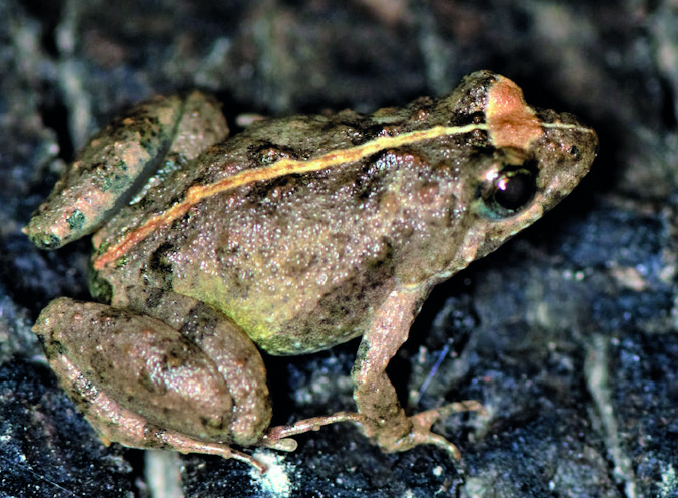
Amapá, Brazil

== Reproduction ==
This frog reproduces in temporary and permanent ponds and moist grasslands. The female frog deposits her eggs in the water, where the tadpoles develop.

== Threats ==
The IUCN classifies this frog as least concern of extinction. In some parts of its range, the frog may be in danger from fires, farms, logging, pollution, and infrastructure development.
