= Pseudopaludicola motorzinho =

Conservation status
- Least Concern (IUCN 3.1)

Scientific classification
- Kingdom: Animalia
- Phylum: Chordata
- Class: Amphibia
- Order: Anura
- Family: Leptodactylidae
- Genus: Pseudopaludicola
- Species: P. motorzinho

Binomial name
- Pseudopaludicola motorzinho Pansonato, Veiga-Menoncello, Mudrek, Jansen, Recco-Pimentel, Martins, and Strüssmann, 2016

Species of frog

Pseudopaludicola motorzinho is a species of frog in the family Leptodactylidae. It is native to Brazil and Bolivia and suspected in Paraguay.

== Habitat ==
This frog is known from Amazonia, Cerrado, and Pantanal biomes, where it is found in occasionally flooded savannah and shrubland and occasionally in urban areas or flooded forest.

The frog's habitat overlaps a few protected places: Parque Nacional Pantanal, Reserva Particular do Patrimônio Natural Acurizal, Área Natural de Manejo Integrado San Matias, and Parque Nacional y Área Natural de Manejo Integrado Otuquis.

== Threats ==
The IUCN classifies this frog as least concern of extinction. In some places, it is subject to habitat loss associated with logging, agriculture, including eucalyptus tree farms, and cattle and other livestock cultivation.

== Original description ==
- Pansonato A. Veiga-Menoncello; Mudrek JR; Jansen M; Recco-Pimentel SM; Mrtins IA; Struessmann C (2016). "Two new species of Pseudopaludicola Miranda-Ribeiro, 1926 (Anura: Leptodactylidae: :eiuperinae) from eastern Bolivia and western Brazil". Herpetologica. 72: 235–255.
