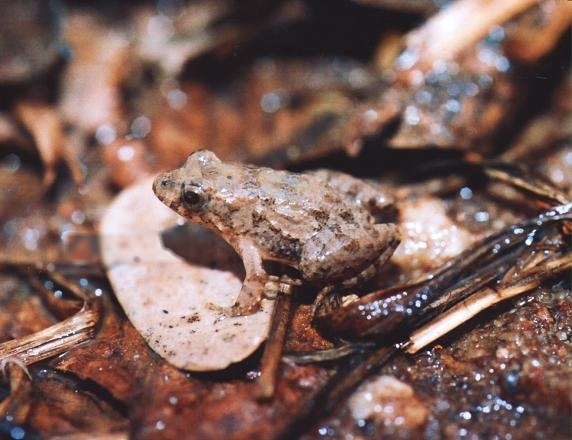

Conservation status
- Least Concern (IUCN 3.1)

Scientific classification
- Kingdom: Animalia
- Phylum: Chordata
- Class: Amphibia
- Order: Anura
- Family: Leptodactylidae
- Genus: Pseudopaludicola
- Species: P. mystacalis

Binomial name
- Pseudopaludicola mystacalis (Cope, 1887)

Synonyms
- Paludicola ameghini Cope, 1887

= Pseudopaludicola mystacalis =

Species of frog

Pseudopaludicola mystacalis is a species of frog in the family Leptodactylidae. It is found in Argentina, Bolivia, Brazil, Paraguay, and possibly Uruguay.

== Habitat ==
This frog is found in Cerrado, Amazônia, Pampa, Pantanal, and Atlantic forest biomes and near cattle watering areas. This frog has shown some tolerance to anthropogenic disturbance. Scientists have seen it between 0 and 1,000 m (0 and 3,281 ft) above sea level.

Scientists have reported these frogs in protected places: APA da Chapada dos Guimaraes, APA da Marituba do Peixe, APA das Nascentes do Rio Vermelho, APA de Murici, APA Delta do Parnaiba, APA do Pratagy, APA Serra da Ibiapaba, ESEC de Murici, ESEC Serra Geral do Tocantins, MONA Ponte de Pedra do Rio Correntes, PARES do Jalapao, PARNA da Chapada dos Veadeiros, RPPN Olavo Egydio Setubal, and RPPN Serra D'agua.

== Threats ==
The IUCN classifies this frog as least concern of extinction. In some parts of its range, parts of the population may be in danger from fires and habitat conversion to farmland.
