= Pseudopaludicola jazmynmcdonaldae =

Conservation status
- Endangered (IUCN 3.1)

Scientific classification
- Kingdom: Animalia
- Phylum: Chordata
- Class: Amphibia
- Order: Anura
- Family: Leptodactylidae
- Genus: Pseudopaludicola
- Species: P. jazmynmcdonaldae

Binomial name
- Pseudopaludicola jazmynmcdonaldae Andrade, Silva, Koroiva, Fadel, and Santana, 2019

Species of frog

Pseudopaludicola jazmynmcdonaldae is a species of frog in the family Leptodactylidae. It is endemic to the state of Tocantins in Brazil.

== Description ==
This frog is small in size. Its back legs are shorter than other frogs' back legs. The male frog's voice skin is dark in color with no warts.

== Habitat ==
This frog is known from the type locality in dry savannah in Cerrado biomes. It lives among plants that grow near small, permanent marshes and pools. Scientists believe the frog could also live in livestock pasture. Scientists saw the frog between 174 and 177 m (571 and 581 ft) above sea level.

There are two protected parks near the type locality. Scientists believe the frog may inhabit one of them, Reserva Particular do Patrimônio Natural (RPPN) Canto do Obrieni.

== Reproduction ==
The female frog deposits eggs in the water. The tadpoles swim in the water.

== Threats ==
The IUCN classifies this frog as endangered. The type locality is surrounded by soybean monoculture farms and cattle pasture. The principal threat is conversion of the Cerrado to farmland and the chemicals used on these farms.
