= Pseudopaludicola murundu =

Conservation status
- Least Concern (IUCN 3.1)

Scientific classification
- Kingdom: Animalia
- Phylum: Chordata
- Class: Amphibia
- Order: Anura
- Family: Leptodactylidae
- Genus: Pseudopaludicola
- Species: P. murundu

Binomial name
- Pseudopaludicola murundu Toledo, Siqueira, Duarte, Veiga-Menoncello, Recco-Pimentel, and Haddad, 2010

Synonyms
- Pseudopaludicola serrana Toledo, 2010

Species of frog

Pseudopaludicola murundu, the long-legged swamp froglet, is a species of frog in the family Leptodactylidae. It is endemic to Brazil.

== Habitat ==
This frog is found in Cerrado and Atlantic forest biome s 600 m (2,000 ft) above sea level. The male frogs call from small, vegetation-covered rises in the ground near shallow bodies of water where the water moves slowly. These rises are called murundus.

Scientists have reported these frogs from some protected places, such as Área de Proteção Ambiental Morro da Pedreira, Área de Proteção Ambiental Piracicaba Juqueri Mirím Área I, Área de Proteção Ambiental Sul RMBH, Área de Proteção Especial Ouro Preto/Mariana, and RPPN Luiz Carlos Jurovsk Tamassia.

== Reproduction ==
The tadpoles are active at night.

== Threats ==
The IUCN classifies this frog as least concern of extinction. In some places, the frogs are in some danger from habitat loss associated with cattle grazing, agriculture, and the resulting soil erosion and stream sedimentation.

== Original description ==
- Toledo LF; Siqueira S; Duarte TC; Veiga-Menoncello ACP; Recco-Pimental SM; Haddad CFB (2010). "Description of a new species of Pseudopaludicola Miranda-Ribeiro, 1926 from the state of Sao Paulo, southeastern Brazil (Anura, Leiuperidae)". Zootaxa. 2496: 38–48.
