= Pseudopaludicola facureae =

Conservation status
- Least Concern (IUCN 3.1)

Scientific classification
- Kingdom: Animalia
- Phylum: Chordata
- Class: Amphibia
- Order: Anura
- Family: Leptodactylidae
- Genus: Pseudopaludicola
- Species: P. facureae

Binomial name
- Pseudopaludicola facureae Andrade and Carvalho, 2013

Species of frog

Pseudopaludicola facureae is a species of frog in the family Leptodactylidae. It is endemic to Brazil.

== Habitat ==
This frog is found in palm tree swamps and savanna within Cerrado biomes. It has also been observed in livestock pasture and artificial lakes. Scientists have seen it between 610 and 860 m (2,000 and 2,820 ft) above sea level.

== Reproduction ==
The male frogs sit near slow flowing, shallow streams with muddy bottoms and call to the female frogs. The female frog deposits her eggs in moving water.

== Threats ==
The IUCN classifies this frog as least concern of extinction. In some places, it is subject to habitat loss in favor of agriculture, urbanization, and livestock pasturage.

== Original description ==
- Andrade FSD; Carvalho TRD (2013). "A new species of Pseudopaludicola Miranda-Ribeiro (Leiuperinae: Leptodactylide: Anura) from the Cerrado of southeastern Brazil". Zootaxa. 3608: 389–397.
