= Dois Irmãos do Tocantins =

Municipality in Tocantins, Brazil

Coordinates: 9°13′S 48°57′W

- Municipality
- Interactive map of Dois Irmãos do Tocantins
- Country: Brazil
- Region: Northern
- State: Tocantins
- Mesoregion: Ocidental do Tocantins

Population (2020)
  - Total: 7,185
- Time zone: UTC−3 (BRT)

Dois Irmãos do Tocantins is a municipality in the state of Tocantins in the Northern region of Brazil.

The municipality contains 13.58% of the 1,678,000-hectare (4,150,000-acre) Ilha do Bananal / Cantão Environmental Protection Area, created in 1997.

== See also ==
- List of municipalities in Tocantins
