= Pseudopaludicola llanera =

Conservation status
- Least Concern (IUCN 3.1)

Scientific classification
- Kingdom: Animalia
- Phylum: Chordata
- Class: Amphibia
- Order: Anura
- Family: Leptodactylidae
- Genus: Pseudopaludicola
- Species: P. llanera

Binomial name
- Pseudopaludicola llanera Lynch, 1989

Species of frog

Pseudopaludicola llanera (common name: Lynch's swamp frog; Spanish: ranita enana llanera) is a species of frog in the family Leptodactylidae. It is found in the Llanos in the Amazon and Orinoco basins in northeastern Colombia and northern Venezuela. It is mostly found at altitudes below 800 m (2,600 ft), but there is one record from Cerro Corocoro (Venezuela) at 1,220 m (4,000 ft) above sea level. The specific name llanera is Spanish word for a female inhabitant of the Llanos.

== Description ==
Males measure 12.5–14.6 mm (0.49–0.57 in) and females 13.8–17.7 mm (0.54–0.70 in) in snout–vent length. The dorsal colour is brown with some slightly darker markings; the skin bears flattened warts of various sizes. The upper arm is dull orange. The groin and concealed surfaces of the thighs are stippled with straw yellow. The flanks have dark olive lower edges. The throat (flecked with grey) and venter are white.

== Habitat and conservation ==
Pseudopaludicola llanera occur in a range of habitats: savannas, grasslands, degraded tropical dry forests, and gallery forests. During the dry season they can occur in dry leaf-litter along the beds of temporary streams. Eggs are laid in temporary or permanent ponds or in temporary streams.

This species can be locally impacted by expanding rice fields and the chemical pollution associated with them.
