= Pseudopaludicola giarettai =

Conservation status
- Least Concern (IUCN 3.1)

Scientific classification
- Kingdom: Animalia
- Phylum: Chordata
- Class: Amphibia
- Order: Anura
- Family: Leptodactylidae
- Genus: Pseudopaludicola
- Species: P. giarettai

Binomial name
- Pseudopaludicola giarettai Carvalho, 2012

Species of frog

Pseudopaludicola giarettai is a frog in the family Leptodactylidae. It is endemic to Brazil.

== Habitat ==
This frog lives in Brazilian Cerrado biomes. Scientists have observed the frogs between 525 and 905 m (1,722 and 2,969 ft) above sea level.

Scientists have reported these frogs from one protected place: Parque Nacional Grande Sertão Veredas.

== Reproduction ==
The male frog perches next to artificial ponds or slow, small streamlets with clear or muddy bottoms and calls to the female frogs, almost exclusively during the day, almost always associated with buriti palm (Mauritia flexuosa) marshes. The free-swimming tadpoles develop in water.

== Threats ==
The IUCN classifies this species as least concern. What threat the frog faces comes from habitat loss associated with agriculture, livestock cultivation, and urbanization. Specifically, many nearby farms use unsustainable practices that involve soil erosion and resulting sedimentation of the streams upon which the frog relies.

== Original description ==
- de Carvalho TR (2012). "A new species of Pseudopaludicola Miranda-Ribeiro (Leiuperinae: Leptodactylidae: Anura) from the Cerrado of southeastern Brazil with a distinctive advertisement call pattern". Zootaxa. 3328: 47–54.
