= Jacarenema Ecological Reserve =

Jacarenema State Ecological Reserve
- Reserva Ecológica Estadual de Jacarenema
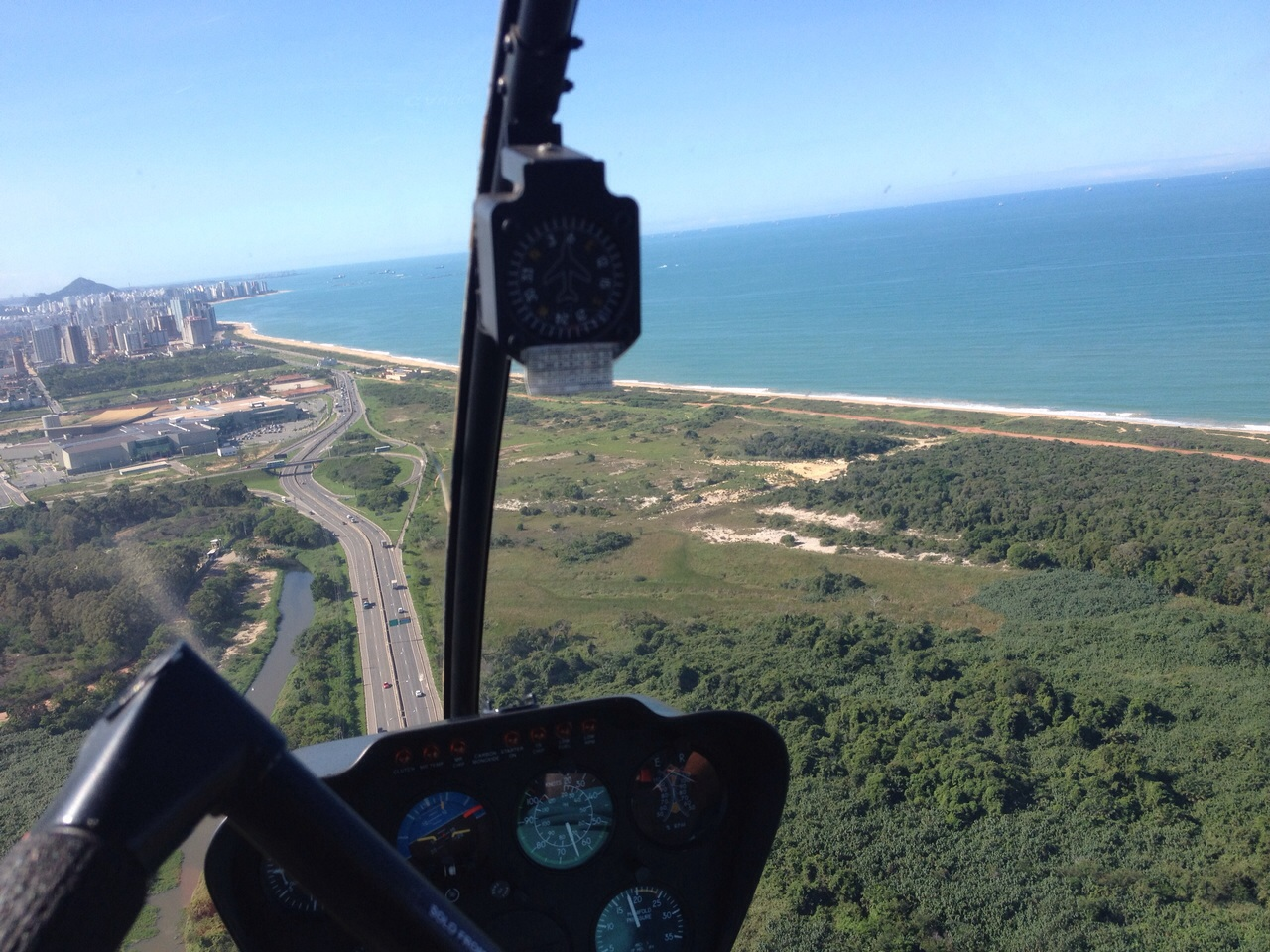
- North of the reserve (right), Vila Velha in background

- Location within Brazil
- Nearest city: Vila Velha, Espírito Santo
- Coordinates: 20.414508°S 40.323044°W
- Area: 307 hectares (760 acres)
- Designation: Ecological reserve
- Created: 1997

Jacarenema Ecological Reserve (Portuguese: Reserva Ecológica de Jacarenema) is an ecological reserve in the state of Espírito Santo, Brazil. It is near the city of Vila Velha, is readily accessible to the public and does not conform to standard Brazilian definitions of environmental units.

== Location ==
The Jacarenema State Ecological Reserve has an area of 307 hectares (760 acres), covering the Morro da Concha sandbar, the estuary of the Jucu River, and a mosaic of areas of Restinga along the Rodovia do Sol. It was created by Municipal decree 056/83. It is accessible for fishing, swimming and boating. The reserve may be reached via the 1896 Madalena bridge from the Barra do Jucu neighbourhood, or by walking along the Itaparica beach from the north. There are ruins of Jesuit buildings in the reserve.

The Jacarenema Ecological Reserve was created by state law 5.427 of 1997 at the initiative of deputy Claudio Vereza, supported by governor Vitor Buaiz. The reserve's definition does not conform to the National System of Nature Conservation Units (SNUC) which does not recognise this type of conservation unit.

== Environment ==
The Jacarenema State Ecological Reserve contains sandbank vegetation of the Atlantic Forest biome that is still in good condition. The mangroves along the river bank include Avicennia germinans (42.26%), Laguncularia racemosa (34.42%), Hibiscus tiliaceus (9.80%) and Rhizophora mangle (4.57%) The river often receives waste water from the municipalities along its course, as well as urban garbage that accumulates around the mangroves at its mouth in the ecological reserve. A 2006 report found that 5.45% of the standing trees were dead, apparently due to the impact of pollution.

== Sources ==
- Carlos Rossi (12 January 2013), "7432 – Planete Verde – Reserva Ecológica de Jacarenema", Mega Arquivo (in Portuguese)
- Cláudia Solares; Ediene Lea Vaccari (December 2002), Zoneamento Ambiental Reserva Ecológica de Jacarenema - ES (PDF) (in Portuguese), Vila Velha: Avidepa: Associação Vila-velhense de Proteção Ambiental, archived from the original (PDF) on 2016-07-06
- Silva, Diego Galvagne da; Gomes, Juliana Lisboa; Martins, Marcio Lacerda Lopes (November 2006), "Caracterização da vegetação do Manguezal na Reserva Ecológica de Jacarenema, Vila Velha, ES" (PDF), 57º Congresso Nacional de Botânica, archived from the original (PDF) on 2016-08-06
- "Visite Reserva Ecológica de Jacarenema", Visite Vila Velha (in Portuguese), 23 February 2011, archived from the original on 30 June 2016
