= Alcobaça Ecological Reserve =

Protected area in Rio de Janeiro, Brazil

- Reserva Ecológica do Alcobaça
- Location within Brazil
- Nearest city: Petrópolis, Rio de Janeiro
- Coordinates: 22.472°S 43.117°W
- Area: 228 hectares (560 acres)
- Designation: Ecological reserve
- Created: 5 May 1988

Alcobaça Ecological Reserve (Portuguese: Reserva Ecológica do Alcobaça) is an ecological reserve in the state of Rio de Janeiro, Brazil.

== History ==
The reserve area was owned in the first decades of the 20th century by Jose Soares Maciel Filho, owner of a large textile mill. After the plant went bankrupt the reserve area was sold in 1982 to the National Housing Bank, which planned to build 2,500 housing units. Concern about the potential impact on water resources resulted in formation of ADMA – Associação em Defesa dos Mananciais do Alcobaça, which took responsibility for preserving the forest and managing water resources. The Ecological Reserve was created by decree on 5 May 1988. In 2005 the reserve was transferred to the Brazilian Institute of Environment and Renewable Natural Resources (Ibama).

== Status ==
The reserve covers an area of 228 hectares (560 acres) and has altitude from about 825 to 1,040 metres (2,707 to 3,412 ft). It lies in parts of the municipalities of Magé and Teresópolis in Rio de Janeiro. The reserve is representative of the Atlantic Forest biome, and has primary forest tracts in excellent condition.

== Sources ==
- "Reserva Ecológica de Alcobaça", Folha do Meio Ambiente (in Portuguese), 20 December 2005, archived from the original on 28 April 2016
- Reserva Ecológica do Alcobaça (in Portuguese), Instituto IDEIAS
