= Chapada de Areia =

Municipality in Tocantins, Brazil

- Municipality
- Location in Tocantins state

- Location in Brazil
- Coordinates: 10°08′31″S 49°10′46″W
- Country: Brazil
- Region: North
- State: Tocantins

Area
  - Total: 659 km^{2} (254 sq mi)

Population (2020)
  - Total: 1,410
  - Density: 2.14/km^{2} (5.54/sq mi)
- Time zone: UTC−3 (BRT)

Chapada de Areia is a municipality located in the Brazilian state of Tocantins. Its population was 1,410 (2020) and its area is 659 km^{2}.

The municipality contains 2% of the 1,678,000-hectare (4,150,000-acre) Ilha do Bananal / Cantão Environmental Protection Area, created in 1997.

== See also ==
- List of municipalities in Tocantins
