= Pseudopaludicola matuta =

Conservation status
- Least Concern (IUCN 3.1)

Scientific classification
- Kingdom: Animalia
- Phylum: Chordata
- Class: Amphibia
- Order: Anura
- Family: Leptodactylidae
- Genus: Pseudopaludicola
- Species: P. matuta

Binomial name
- Pseudopaludicola matuta Andrade, Haga, Lyra, Carvalho, Haddad, Giaretta, and Toledo, 2018

Species of frog

Pseudopaludicola matuta is a species of frog in the family Leptodactylidae. It is endemic to the state of Minas Gerais in Brazil.

== Habitat ==
This frog is found in savannah and shrubland in Cerrado biomes. People see the frog in marshes, pools, groundwater seepages, and marshes in gallery forest. It has shown some tolerance to anthropogenic disturbance: people see it in livestock pasture and in cows' footprints. Scientists have seen it between 500 and 800 m (1,600 and 2,600 ft) above sea level.

Scientists have reported this frog from a protected place, Serra do Cipó National Park.

== Reproduction ==
The female frog deposits her eggs in still water, where the free-swimming tadpoles develop.

== Threats ==
The IUCN classifies this frog as least concern of extinction. In some places, it is subject to habitat loss associated with agriculture. The city of Belo Horizonte has also expanded into the frog's range.

== Original description ==
- Andrade FS; Haga IA; Lyra ML; Carvalho TR; Haddad CFB; Giaretta AA; Toledo LF (2018). "A new species of Pseudopaludicola (Anura, Leptodactylidae, Leiuperinae) from the state of Minas Gerais, Brazil". European Journal of Taxonomy (Abstract and references). 480: 1–25.
