= Ecological reserve (Brazil) =

Type of protected area in Brazil

The term ecological reserve (Portuguese: Reserva Ecológica) is used for various protected areas of Brazil administered by the federal government, states and municipalities of Brazil that provide some degree of protection of the environment, although they do not conform to IUCN protected area categories. They include:

Name	State	Level	Created	Area (ha)
Alcobaça Ecological Reserve	Rio de Janeiro	Federal (Brazilian Institute of Environment and Renewable Natural Resources	1988 (Federal in 2005)	228
Apiacás Ecological Reserve	Mato Grosso	State	1994	100,000
Great Pontal Reserve	São Paulo	State	1942	246,840
IBGE Ecological Reserve	Federal District	Federal	1995	1,300
Ilha dos Lobos Ecological Reserve	Rio Grande do Sul	Federal	1983	1.7
Jacarenema Ecological Reserve	Espírito Santo	State	1997	307
Juatinga Ecological Reserve	Rio de Janeiro	State	1992	9,960
Lagoa São Paulo Reserve	São Paulo	State	1942	937
Mata do Bacurizal e do Lago Caraparu Ecological Reserve	Pará	Municipal and private		
