= South Amazon Ecotones Ecological Corridor =

- Corredor Ecológico dos Ecótonos Sul-Amazônicos
- Location within Brazil
- Coordinates: 9°32′46″S 55°47′38″W
- Area: 27,242,700 hectares (67,318,000 acres)
- Designation: Ecological corridor

The South Amazon Ecotones Ecological Corridor (Portuguese: Corredor Ecológico dos Ecótonos Sul-Amazônicos) is a proposed ecological corridor connecting conservation units and indigenous territories that form an ecotone, or transition between the south of the Amazon rainforest and the north of the cerrado of Brazil.

== Background ==
The first version of the Ecological Corridors of Tropical Forests of Brazil proposal was developed by a group of consultants at the request of the Brazilian Ministry of the Environment and presented in the first half of 1997. Seven major corridors were proposed: the Central Amazon Ecological Corridor, Northern Amazon Ecological Corridor, South Amazon Ecological Corridor, South Amazon Ecotones Ecological Corridor, Western Amazon Ecological Corridor, Central Atlantic Forest Ecological Corridor and Serra do Mar Ecological Corridor. These corresponded to about 25% of the rainforests of Brazil. Priority was given to the Central Amazon Corridor and the Central Atlantic Forest Corridor, which would test and develop the concepts for use with the subsequent corridors.

== Proposed scope ==
The South Amazon Ecotones Ecological Corridor was one of five Amazon region corridors identified. It covers the ecotones in the interconnection between the south of the Amazon rainforest and the cerrado of Central Brazil. It is located in the most threatened Amazon region due to the advance of agriculture and ranching in the north of Mato Grosso and south of Pará. The corridor was identified as vulnerable but relatively stable, regionally relevant in biological importance and moderate to high priority on a regional scale. It included six priority areas in three main Amazon ecoregions.

The most common forms of vegetation are open rainforest and seasonal semi-deciduous forest. It is threatened by unsustainable logging and continued expansion of monocultures. The corridor has great biodiversity, with an estimated 700 species of birds and 29 primate species. Many species are considered endangered. The conservation units and indigenous territories form four large blocks, which require some form of interconnection.

Conservation units in the original proposal included the Jaru Biological Reserve, Cristalino State Park, Araguaia National Park, Cantão State Park (south part) and Ilha do Bananal / Cantão Environmental Protection Area (southwest part). It would also include the Iquê Ecological Station, Serra do Cachimbo State Park and Rio Roosevelt State Forest. The proposed corridor was later expanded to include the Rio Ronuro Ecological Station, Rio Roosevelt Ecological Station, Rio Madeirinha Ecological Station and Apiacás Ecological Reserve. This brought its area up to 761,576 square kilometres (294,046 sq mi), including parts of the states of Amazonas, Rondônia, Pará, Mato Grosso and Tocantins.

== Sources ==
- Ayres, José Márcio; Da Fonseca, Gustavo A. B.; Rylands, Anthony B.; Queiroz, Helder L.; Pinto, Luiz Paulo; Masterson, Donald; Cavalcanti, Roberto B. (2005), Os Corredores Ecológicos das Florestas Tropicais do Brasil (PDF) (in Portuguese), Sociedade Civil Mamirauá
- Corredores Ecológicos na Mata Atlântica (in Portuguese), RBMA: Atlantic Forest Biosphere Reserve
- O Corredor Central Da Mata Atlãntica (PDF) (in Portuguese), MMA: Ministry of the Environment (Brazil)
