= Abreulândia =

Municipality in Tocantins, Brazil

- Municipality
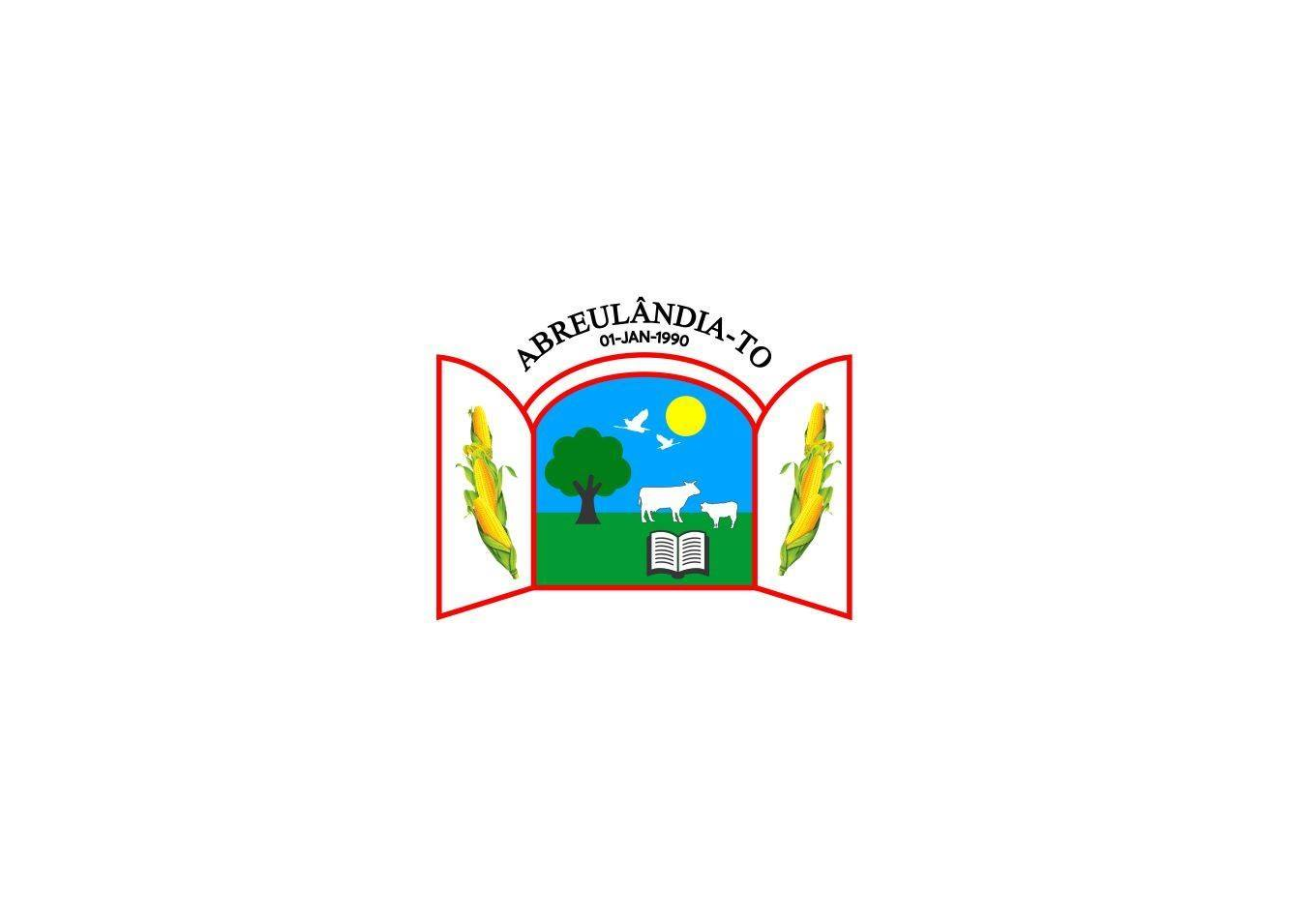
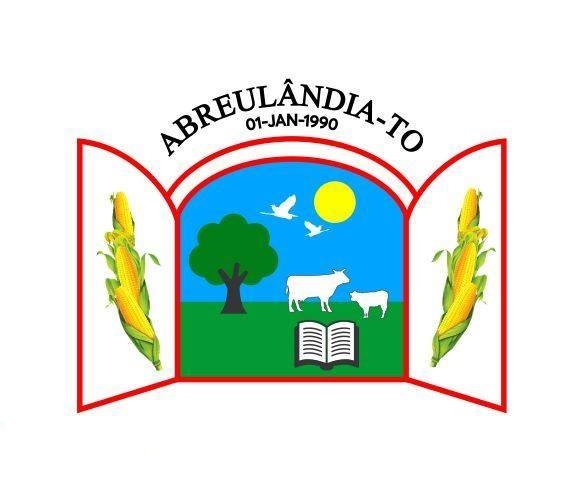
- Flag Coat of arms

- Location in Tocantins state

- Location in Brazil
- Coordinates: 9°37′15″S 49°9′3″W
- Country: Brazil
- Region: North
- State: Tocantins

Area
  - Total: 1,895 km^{2} (732 sq mi)

Population (2020)
  - Total: 2,594
  - Density: 1.369/km^{2} (3.545/sq mi)
- Time zone: UTC−3 (BRT)

Abreulândia is a municipality located in the Brazilian state of Tocantins. Its population was 2,594 (2020) and its area is 1,895 square kilometres (732 sq mi).

The municipality contains 9.44% of the 1,678,000-hectare (4,150,000-acre) Ilha do Bananal / Cantão Environmental Protection Area, created in 1997.

== See also ==
- List of municipalities in Tocantins
