= Apiacás Ecological Reserve =

- IUCN category Ia (strict nature reserve)
- Location within Brazil
- Coordinates: 9.544°S 57.451°W
- Area: 100,000 hectares (250,000 acres)
- Designation: Ecological reserve
- Created: 22 June 1994
- Administrator: Mato Grosso state environmental foundation

Apiacás Ecological Reserve is a State ecological reserve in the State of Mato Grosso, in Brazil.

== History ==
Many expeditions passed through the Apiacás territory, notably the "paranistas" in the 18th and 19th centuries. The ecological reserve was created by state law 6.464 of 22 June 1994 in the area named Arrecadação da Gleba Pontal. The objective was to protect and research the flora, fauna and natural beauty of the location. The state environmental foundation was responsible for administration.

== Location ==
The reserve lies in the municipality of Apiacás and has an area of about 100,000 hectares (250,000 acres) The Teles Pires River bounds it to the east and the Juruena River to the west. It extends to the confluence of these rivers in the north. The reserve is one of the least-studied areas of the Amazon biome. It is laced with an intricate network of streams in the basins of the Juruena and Teles Pires. The reserve would be in the proposed South Amazon Ecotones Ecological Corridor.

== Fauna ==
The reserve is home to several endangered species including the giant anteater (Myrmecophaga tridactyla), bush dog (Speothos venaticus) and swallow-tailed kite (Elanoides forficatus). A total of 193 bird species have been recorded, including the endangered Kawall's amazon (Amazona kawalli), golden parakeet (Guaruba guarouba), orange-cheeked parrot (Pyrilia barrabandi), vulturine parrot (Pyrilia vulturina) and golden-crowned manakin (Lepidothrix vilasboasi).

== Sources ==
- Ayres, José Márcio; Da Fonseca, Gustavo A. B.; Rylands, Anthony B.; Queiroz, Helder L.; Pinto, Luiz Paulo; Masterson, Donald; Cavalcanti, Roberto B. (2005), Os Corredores Ecológicos das Florestas Tropicais do Brasil (PDF) (in Portuguese), Sociedade Civil Mamirauá, archived from the original (PDF) on 2016-07-31
- Jayme Verissimo de Campos (22 June 1994), LEI Nº 6.464, DE 22 DE JUNHO DE 1994 - D.O. 22.06.94, archived from the original on 9 August 2016
- Pitaluga Costa e Silva, Paulo; Vicente Ferreira, João Carlos (1994), Breve história de Mato Grosso e de seus municípios (in Portuguese), Texaská univerzita
- Reserva Ecológica de Apiacás (in Portuguese), Via Rural, archived from the original on 2016-04-24
