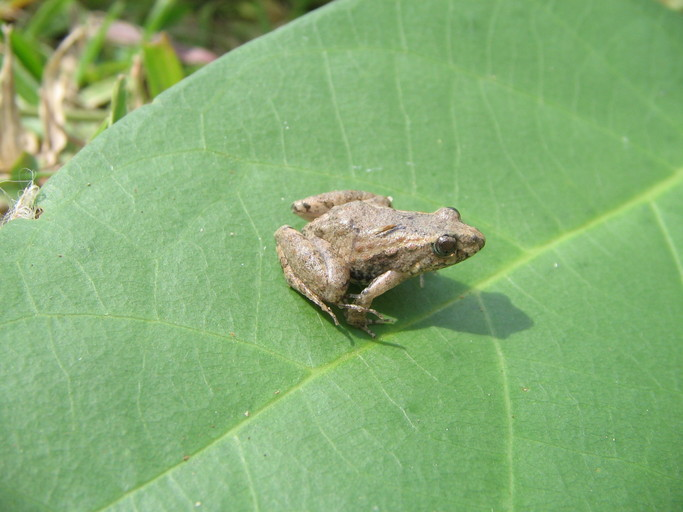

Conservation status
- Least Concern (IUCN 3.1)

Scientific classification
- Kingdom: Animalia
- Phylum: Chordata
- Class: Amphibia
- Order: Anura
- Family: Leptodactylidae
- Genus: Pseudopaludicola
- Species: P. pusilla

Binomial name
- Pseudopaludicola pusilla (Ruthven, 1916)

= Pseudopaludicola pusilla =

Species of frog

The Colombian swamp frog (Pseudopaludicola pusilla) is a species of frog in the family Leptodactylidae. It is found in Colombia and Venezuela. Its natural habitats are subtropical or tropical dry forests, subtropical or tropical moist lowland forests, dry savanna, moist savanna, subtropical or tropical dry shrubland, subtropical or tropical dry lowland grassland, intermittent rivers, freshwater marshes, intermittent freshwater marshes, coast and pastureland. It has been observed between 0 and 150 m (0 and 492 ft) above sea level.
