= Pseudopaludicola ameghini =

Conservation status
- Least Concern (IUCN 3.1)

Scientific classification
- Kingdom: Animalia
- Phylum: Chordata
- Class: Amphibia
- Order: Anura
- Family: Leptodactylidae
- Genus: Pseudopaludicola
- Species: P. ameghini

Binomial name
- Pseudopaludicola ameghini (Cope, 1887)

Synonyms
- Paludicola ameghini Cope, 1887

Species of frog

Pseudopaludicola ameghini, the dwarf swamp frog, is a species of frog. It is known from Brazil.

== Description ==
The adult male frog measures 19 mm in snout-vent length and the adult female frog 22 mm. The skin of the dorsum and flanks can be light or dark lead-gray. There is a dark band across both eyes and some light marks on the upper lip. There are some bars on the back legs. The ventrum is white with some black marks on the throat.

== Habitat ==
This frog is known from Cerrado, Amazônia, and Pantanal places and in transition areas near other biomes, such as Atlantic forest. The frogs appear in seepages near streams, where groundwater emerges. Scientists have observed this frog between 165 and 793 m (541 and 2,602 ft) above sea level.

Scientists have reported these frogs from several protected places: Parque Nacional Cerro Corá, Parque Nacional Serranía San Luis, Reserva Natural Cerrado del Tagatiyá, ESEC da Serra das Araras, and PARNA da Chapada dos Guimaraes.

== Reproduction ==
The male frog calls to the female frogs at dusk. The female frog deposits her eggs in shallow water, sometimes on underwater plants. There is a jelly on the eggs to keep them from moving. The tadpoles are dark in color with translucent tissue in their fins. Their teeth are dark in color.

== Threats ==
The IUCN classifies this frog as least concern of extinction. In some parts of the species' range, some subpopulations may be in danger from farms and cattle grazing.

== Formal description ==
- Pansonato A.; Strüssmann C.; Mudrek J.R.; Martins I.A. (2013). ""Morphometric and bioacoustic data on three species of Pseudopaludicola Miranda-Ribeiro, 1926 (Anura: Leptodactylidae: Leiuperinae) described from Chapada dos Guimaraes, Mato Grosso, Brazil, with the revalidation of Pseudopaludicola ameghini (Cope, 1887)."". Zootaxa (Revalidation). 3620: 147–162.
