= Tucumã State Park =

State park in Mato Grosso, Brazil

- Parque Estadual Tucumã
- IUCN category II (national park)
- Location within Brazil
- Nearest city: Colniza, Mato Grosso
- Coordinates: 8.851974°S 61.177999°W
- Area: 80,945 hectares (200,020 acres)
- Designation: State park
- Created: 12 November 2002
- Administrator: Coordenadoria de Unidades de Conservação (MT)

The Tucumã State Park (Portuguese: Parque Estadual Tucumã) is a state park in the state of Mato Grosso, Brazil.

== Location ==
The Tucumã State Park is in the Colniza municipality of Mato Grosso. It has an area of 80,945 hectares (200,020 acres). The park is bounded by the border with the state of Amazonas to the north, and adjoins the Manicoré State Forest and the Campos Amazônicos National Park in Amazonas. To the east it borders the Rio Roosevelt Ecological Station. It surrounds the Rio Madeirinha Ecological Station on the west, north and east. The Madeirinha River forms the western boundary between the state park and the Rio Madeirinha Ecological Station, then runs northwest into the Manicoré State Forest. The MT-418 runs to the south of the park.

== History ==
The park was created by decree 5.439 of the Mato Grosso state governor on 12 November 2002 with an area of 66,475 hectares (164,260 acres). On 23 February 2005 the limits were expanded to contain an area of 80,944.71 hectares (200,018.7 acres). The consultative council was created on 15 December 2014.

== Sources ==
- PES Tucumã (in Portuguese), ISA:Instituto Socioambiental
