= Ilha do Bananal / Cantão Environmental Protection Area =

Protected area in Tocantins, Brazil

- Área de Proteção Ambiental Ilha do Bananal/Cantão
- IUCN category V (protected landscape/seascape)
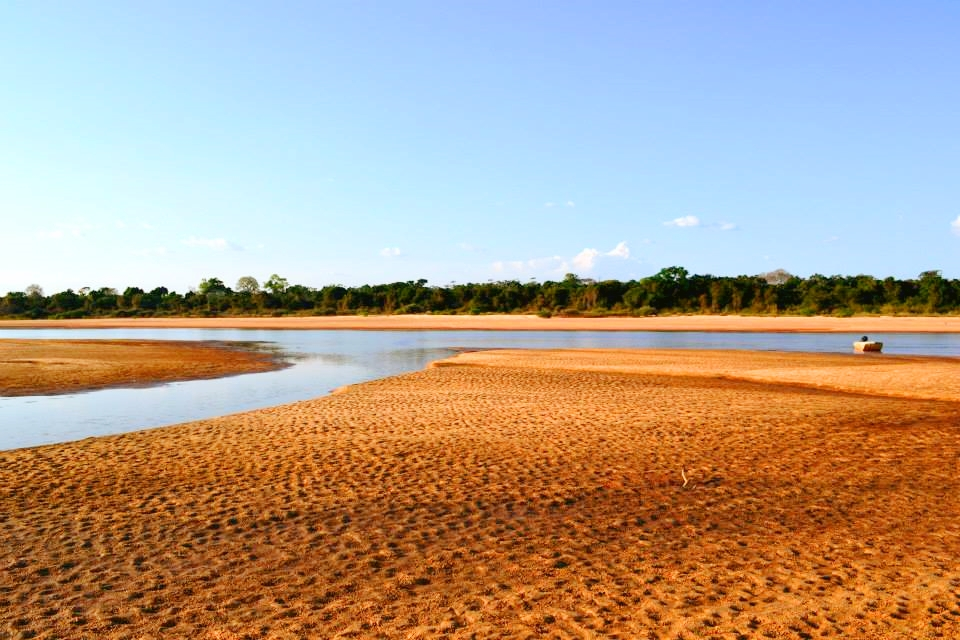
- Bananal Island, Javaés River, 2015

- Location within Brazil
- Nearest city: Pium. Tocantins
- Coordinates: 9.655774°S 49.527835°W
- Area: 1,678,000 hectares (4,150,000 acres)
- Designation: Environmental protection area
- Created: 20 May 1997
- Administrator: Instituto Natureza do Tocantins

The Ilha do Bananal / Cantão Environmental Protection Area (Portuguese: Área de Proteção Ambiental Ilha do Bananal/Cantão or Leandro Environmental Protection Area is an environmental protection area in the state of Tocantins, Brazil.

== Location ==
The Ilha do Bananal / Cantão Environmental Protection Area (APA) is divided between the municipalities of Pium (21.56%), Monte Santo do Tocantins (1.2%), Marianópolis do Tocantins (13.38%), Dois Irmãos do Tocantins (13.58%), Divinópolis do Tocantins (11.03%), Chapada de Areia (2.01%), Caseara (10.66%), Araguacema (17.15%) and Abreulândia (9.44%) in Tocantins. It has an area of 1,678,000 hectares (4,150,000 acres). It is the largest protected area in the state. The APA adjoins the Cantão State Park and the Araguaia National Park to the west. It contains the buffer zone of the state park. The boundary with the state park is defined by the Coco River, and the boundary with the national park by the Javaés River. The APA would be included in the planned South Amazon Ecotones Ecological Corridor.

== Environment ==
The Cantão State Park is one of the most important protected areas in the Brazilian Amazon. The Cantão has great biological diversity, including some species at risk of extinction, and is in a good state of preservation. The park covers the inland delta of the Javaés River, with more than 800 lakes and channels, subject to annual flooding. It holds a complex ecotone with elements of Amazon rainforest, cerrado, pantanal and Atlantic Forest. The APA serves as a buffer zone for the state park. Vegetation in the APA is 12% open rainforest, 8% dense rainforest and 27% savanna contact rainforest.

== History ==
The Ilha do Bananal / Cantão Environmental Protection Area was created by state law 907 of 20 May 1997. This law also created the co-management council. The management board of the APA is deliberative. The name was altered to the Leandro APA by law 1.013 of 29 October 1998, but subsequent documents continue to call it the Ilha do Bananal / Cantão APA.

In 2003 the state governor approved a project to survey organizations in the APA and discuss how they could help improve sustainable development of the APA. The project was cut short before completing its work, but resulted in formation of COAFA, the organization of agricultural families of the APA. In 2004 the state government presented a bill to the legislature to reduce the APA by over 80% to make way for agricultural expansion. The proposal was approved, but a campaign was launched against it by university students, teachers and NGOs. They developed a manifesto that said the APA is a place with hundreds of families, traditional communities and rich biodiversity with many species still unknown to science. In response, the federal court in Tocantins suspended the proposed law.

The members of the council took office of 22 April 2008. Management rules related to turtle conservation were issued on 22 July 2008. In December 2013 the management plan was being revised by the Instituto Natureza do Tocantins (Naturatins) with the participation of local rural producers.

== Economy ==
The objectives are to improve the quality of life of the residents and to protect regional ecosystems. Exploitation and direct economic use of natural resources is allowed, but in a planned and regulated manner. The APA is divided into zones with four types of land use:

- Special uses zones (1.27%) are totally modified landscapes containing housing or the urban periphery
- Economic development zones (65.10%) are used for agriculture and livestock raising following rational and sustainable practices
- Wildlife conservation zones (17.46%) have special environmental conservation needs, with more stringent protective measures and environmental recovery projects where needed.
- Wildlife preservation zones (16.22%) have minimal interference with the fauna and flora a little or no human pressure on the environment.

== Sources ==
- APA Leandro (Ilha do Bananal/Cantão) (in Portuguese), ISA: Instituto Socioambiental
- Área de Proteção Ambiental Ilha do Bananal Cantão (in Portuguese), SEMA: Secretaria do Meio Ambiente e Recursos Hidricos
- Área de Proteção Ambiental Leandro ( Ilha do Bananal - Cantão ) (in Portuguese), Via Rural, archived from the original on November 3, 2016
- Ayres, José Márcio; Da Fonseca, Gustavo A. B.; Rylands, Anthony B.; Queiroz, Helder L.; Pinto, Luiz Paulo; Masterson, Donald; Cavalcanti, Roberto B. (2005), Os Corredores Ecológicos das Florestas Tropicais do Brasil (PDF) (in Portuguese), Sociedade Civil Mamirauá, archived from the original (PDF) on 2016-07-31
- Carvalho, Maria Do Socorro Normanha de; Rocha, Maria Regina T. da; Chaves, Augustinho de Oliveira (November 2006), Plano territorial de desenvolvimento rural sustentável – território rural da APA do Cantão – Estado do Tocantins (PDF) (in Portuguese), Fundação Cândido Rondon
- Plano de manejo da APA Ilha do Bananal Cantão será revisado (in Portuguese), SEMARH, 6 December 2013
