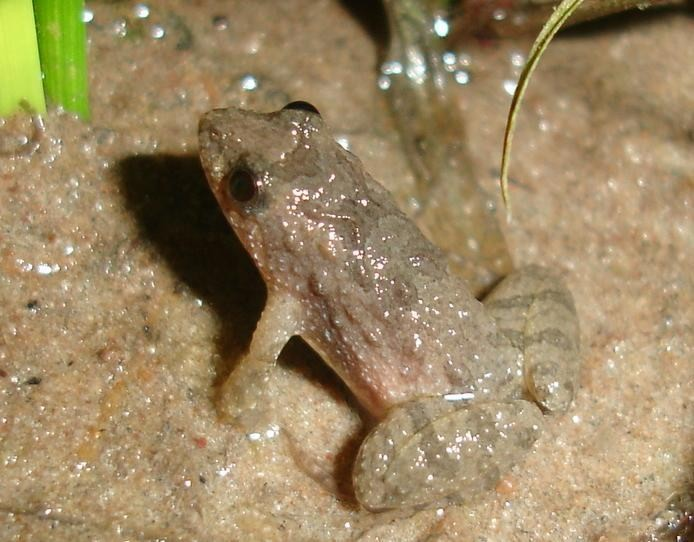
- Pseudopaludicola falcipes

Scientific classification
- Domain: Eukaryota
- Kingdom: Animalia
- Phylum: Chordata
- Class: Amphibia
- Order: Anura
- Family: Leptodactylidae
- Subfamily: Leiuperinae
- Genus: Pseudopaludicola; Miranda-Ribeiro, 1926

Type species
- Liuperus falcipes Hensel, 1867

Species
- About 25, see text

= Pseudopaludicola =

Genus of amphibians

Pseudopaludicola is a genus of leptodactylid frogs from lowland northern and central South America. They are known under the common name dwarf swamp frogs or swamp frogs.

== Systematics ==
Pseudopaludicola are small frogs, growing maximally to 22 mm (0.87 in) in snout–vent length. The synapomorphy defining this genus is the greatly enlarged tubercle on the outer edge of the forearm (i.e., hypertrophied antebrachial tubercle). Genetic analyses have recovered this genus as monophyletic, in accordance with earlier studies using morphological characters. Genetic data suggest four major clades within the genus.

== Species ==
Following the Amphibian Species of the World, there are currently 25 species in this genus:

- Pseudopaludicola ameghini (Cope, 1887)
- Pseudopaludicola atragula Pansonato, Mudrek, Veiga-Menoncello, Rossa-Feres, Martins, and Strüssmann, 2014
- Pseudopaludicola boliviana Parker, 1927
- Pseudopaludicola canga Giaretta and Kokubum, 2003
- Pseudopaludicola ceratophyes Rivero and Serna, 1985
- Pseudopaludicola facureae Andrade and Carvalho, 2013
- Pseudopaludicola falcipes (Hensel, 1867)
- Pseudopaludicola florencei Andrade, Haga, Lyra, Leite, Kwet, Haddad, Toledo, and Giaretta, 2018
- Pseudopaludicola giarettai Carvalho, 2012
- Pseudopaludicola hyleaustralis Pansonato, Morais, Ávila, Kawashita-Ribeiro, Strussmann, and Martins, 2012
- Pseudopaludicola ibisoroca Pansonato, Veiga-Menoncello, Mudrek, Jansen, Recco-Pimentel, Martins, and Strüssmann, 2016
- Pseudopaludicola jaredi Andrade, Magalhães, Nunes-de-Almeida, Veiga-Menoncello, Santana, Garda, Loebmann, Recco-Pimentel, Giaretta, and Toledo, 2016
- Pseudopaludicola jazmynmcdonaldae Andrade, Silva, Koroiva, Fadel, and Santana, 2019
- Pseudopaludicola llanera Lynch, 1989
- Pseudopaludicola matuta Andrade, Haga, Lyra, Carvalho, Haddad, Giaretta, and Toledo, 2018
- Pseudopaludicola mineira Lobo, 1994
- Pseudopaludicola motorzinho Pansonato, Veiga-Menoncello, Mudrek, Jansen, Recco-Pimentel, Martins, and Strüssmann, 2016
- Pseudopaludicola murundu Toledo, Siqueira, Duarte, Veiga-Menoncello, Recco-Pimentel, and Haddad, 2010
- Pseudopaludicola mystacalis (Cope, 1887)
- Pseudopaludicola parnaiba Robert, Cardozo, and Ávila, 2013
- Pseudopaludicola pocoto Magalhães, Loebmann, Kokubum, Haddad, and Garda, 2014
- Pseudopaludicola pusilla (Ruthven, 1916)
- Pseudopaludicola restinga Cardozo, Baldo, Pupin, Gasparini, and Haddad, 2018
- Pseudopaludicola saltica (Cope, 1887)
- Pseudopaludicola ternetzi Miranda-Ribeiro, 1937

AmphibiaWeb also lists Pseudopaludicola serrana, whereas the Amphibian Species of the World considers it synonym of Pseudopaludicola murundu.
