= Pseudopaludicola jaredi =

Conservation status
- Least Concern (IUCN 3.1)

Scientific classification
- Kingdom: Animalia
- Phylum: Chordata
- Class: Amphibia
- Order: Anura
- Family: Leptodactylidae
- Genus: Pseudopaludicola
- Species: P. jaredi

Binomial name
- Pseudopaludicola jaredi Andrade, Magalhães, Nunes-de-Almeida, Veiga-Menoncello, Santana, Garda, Loebmann, Recco-Pimentel, Giaretta, and Toledo, 2016

Species of frog

Pseudopaludicola jaredi is a species of frog in the family Leptodactylidae. It is endemic to Brazil.

== Description ==
The adult male frog measures about 14.5 - 16.3 mm in snout-vent length and the adult female frog about 14.3 - 16.2 mm.

== Etymology ==
Scientists named this frog for herpetologist Carlos Alberto Goncalves Silva Jared, who worked in Brazil.

== Habitat ==
This nocturnal frog is found in savannah, dry forest, and shrubland within Cerrado, Caatinga, and Atlantic forest biomes. It has shown some tolerance to anthropogenic disturbance and has been seen in agricultural areas. Scientists have seen it between 51 and 700 m (167 and 2,297 ft) above sea level.

The study area overlaps or abuts specific protected areas: Área de Preservação Ambiental Serra da Ibiapaba and Floresta Nacional de Nisia Floresta.

== Reproduction ==
The male frogs call to the females in a chorus. The male and female frog engage in amplexus as she deposits her eggs in water, in which the free-swimming tadpoles develop. The tadpoles have an oval-shaped face when viewed from above. The nostrils are nearer to the eyes than to the end of the nose. The ventrum is transparent.

== Threats ==
The IUCN classifies this species as least concern of extinction.
