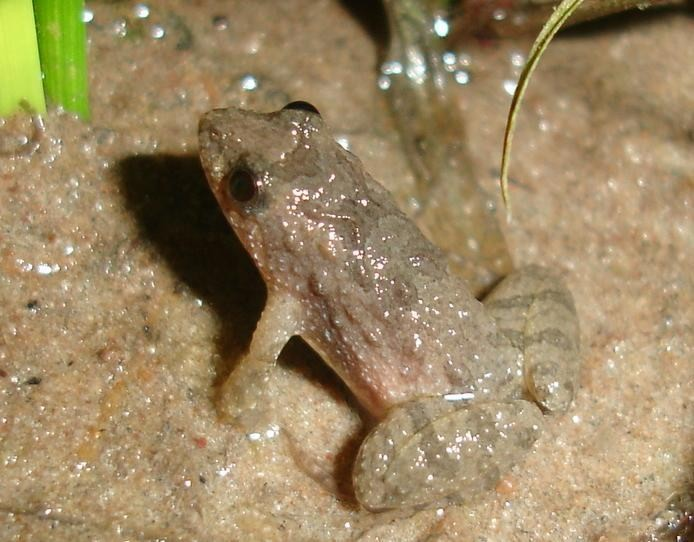

Conservation status
- Least Concern (IUCN 3.1)

Scientific classification
- Kingdom: Animalia
- Phylum: Chordata
- Class: Amphibia
- Order: Anura
- Family: Leptodactylidae
- Genus: Pseudopaludicola
- Species: P. falcipes

Binomial name
- Pseudopaludicola falcipes (Hensel, 1867)

Synonyms
- Liuperus falcipes Hensel, 1867; Paludicola falcipes (Hensel, 1867)

= Pseudopaludicola falcipes =

Species of frog

Pseudopaludicola falcipes (Hensel's swamp frog) is a species of frog in the family Leptodactylidae. It is found in the Pampas of northeastern Argentina, Uruguay, and southern Brazil.

== Description ==
Males measure 13.5–16.0 mm (0.53–0.63 in) and females 14.7–18.1 mm (0.58–0.71 in) in snout–vent length. It shows extensive variation in patterns of dorsal coloration and in morphology.

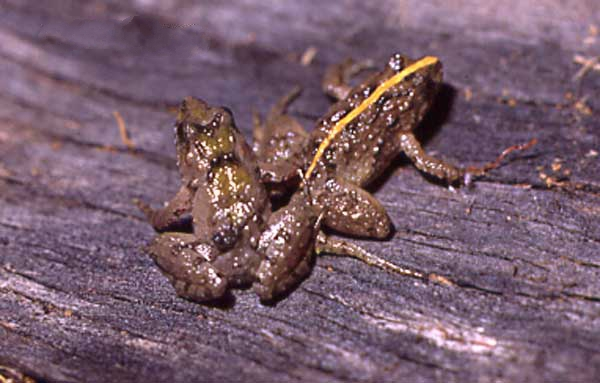
Pseudopaludicola falcipes shows variable dorsal coloration

== Phylogeography ==
Pseudopaludicola falcipes shows a high level of genetic diversity but, contrary to what might expected for a small frog, no significant differentiation across its distribution range. This situation is probably possible because of the homogeneity of its habitat, the Pampean grasslands, large population sizes, and passive mechanisms of dispersal (hydrochory). Molecular data nevertheless suggest that Pseudopaludicola falcipes is divided into two populations, the larger one in Argentina and Uruguay, and the smaller one in Brazil. These populations are estimated to have separated some 1 million years ago, and become into contact again some 260 thousand years ago, permitting gene flow and leading to genetic admixture.

== Habitat and conservation ==
Pseudopaludicola falcipes is a common and abundant species. It is found in grasslands, and also in rice plantations. It breeds in temporary pools and ditches. It adapts well to disturbed habitats and, given its wide distribution, is not considered threatened.

Scientists have seen it between 0 and 1,000 m (0 and 3,281 ft) above sea level. They have reported the frog in many protected areas, including Parque Nacional el Palmar, Parque Nacional Cabo Polonio, Paisaje Protegido Laguna de Rocha, and APA do Ibirapuita.

== See also ==
- Pseudopaludicola restinga
