= Monte Santo do Tocantins =

Municipality in Tocantins, Brazil

- Municipality
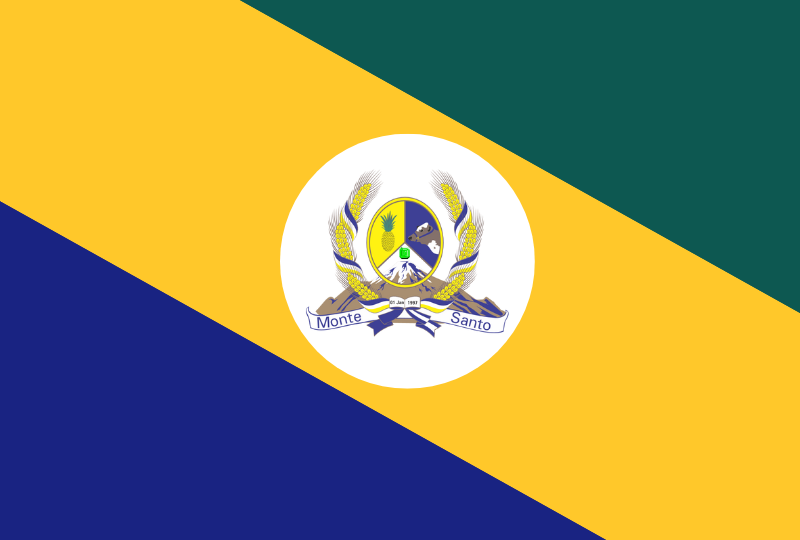
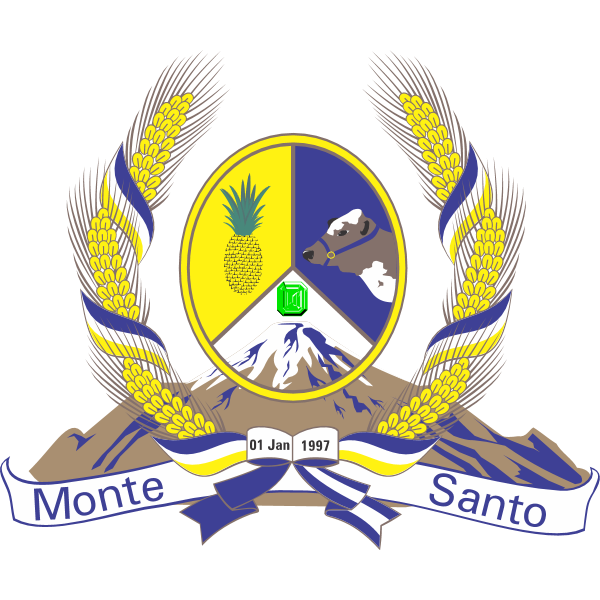
- Flag Coat of arms

- Location in Brazil
- Coordinates: 10°00′21″S 48°59′37″W
- Country: Brazil
- Region: Northern
- State: Tocantins
- Mesoregion: Ocidental do Tocantins

Population (2020)
  - Total: 2,295
- Time zone: UTC−3 (BRT)

Monte Santo do Tocantins is a municipality in the state of Tocantins in the Northern region of Brazil.

The municipality contains 1.2% of the 1,678,000-hectare (4,150,000-acre) Ilha do Bananal / Cantão Environmental Protection Area, created in 1997.

== See also ==
- List of municipalities in Tocantins
