= Rondolândia =

Coordinates: 14°30′S 55°25′W

- Municipality
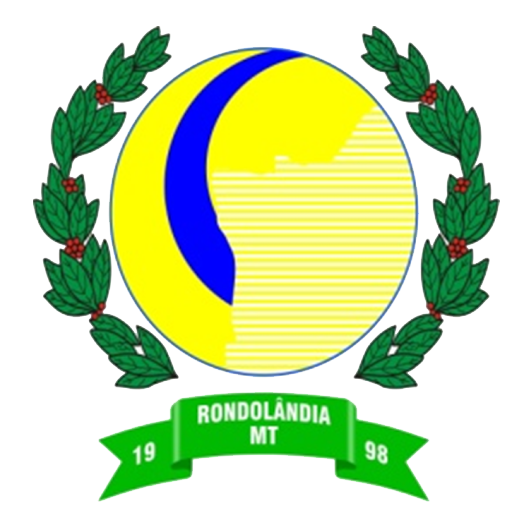
- Coat of arms

- Location in Mao Grosso
- Country: Brazil
- Region: Center-West
- State: Mato Grosso
- Mesoregion: Norte Mato-Grossense

Population (2010)
  - Total: 3,604
- Time zone: UTC−3 (BRT)

Rondolândia is a municipality in the state of Mato Grosso in the Central-West Region of Brazil.

== Location ==
Rondolandia was created in 1998. Rondolândia received status of municipality and district by state law No. 6984 of January 28, 1998, with territory taken from Aripuanã. The municipality of Rondolândia is geographically located in Mato Grosso, but historically the majority of the population has a greater connection with Ji-Paraná and Rondônia Cacoal belonging to, because it is too far from the cities of Mato Grosso. Access the state capital and other cities usually occurs through Rondônia, and follows the time zone RO. In this city every year in May the city mobilizes to the Feast of the Patroness Our Lady Help of Christians, which attracts people from various other locations.

The municipality holds part of the 164,224 hectares (405,810 acres) Guariba-Roosevelt Extractive Reserve, a sustainable use unit created in 1996.

== Political history ==
The First Mayor of Rondolândia was Jose Luis da Silva, elected in municipal elections in 2000 the first Chamber of councilors elected in the same year, was composed of the following councilors: Alony Christian Eller; Agnaldo Rodrigues de Carvalho; Armindo Moreira Magalhaes; Orlando Nunes Maciel, Osmar Appeared Frame; Roldão Oliveira Monteiro Neto, Mauro Keller, Sebastian Castro Gomes and Therese Temponi.

In 2007 the municipality, will count with the Peace and Notary Notes, installed on August 7, 2007, before the notary and registry services was made in the State of Rondônia, such as birth registration, deaths, marriages, having no official statistics the municipality. Having as Designated Official Mr. Evandro Ribeiro Campos, appointed by the County Juína In November of the same year was installed Outpost Special Court, subordinate to the Forum of the District of Juína.

In 2009 Bertilho Buss became mayor of Rondolândia, who remained in office until 2012. In 2013 a woman, Bett Sabah, became the Mayor and she is going to be responsible for the city from 2013 to 2016. It seems a change for the city. A new view became.

== See also ==
- List of municipalities in Mato Grosso
