= Madeirinha River =

River in Brazil

- Location within Brazil
- Native name: Rio Madeirinha (Portuguese)

Location
- Country: Brazil

Physical characteristics
- Source
  - location: Mato Grosso state
- Mouth
  - location: Roosevelt River, Amazonas state
  - coordinates: 8.518710°S 60.958048°W

Basin features
- River system: Roosevelt River

Madeirinha River is a river of Mato Grosso and Amazonas states in north-western Brazil, a left tributary of the Roosevelt River.

== Course ==
In Mato Grosso the river forms the western boundary of the 13,683 hectares (33,810 acres) Rio Madeirinha Ecological Station, a fully protected environmental unit created in 1997. It then flows north east through the Tucumã State Park in Mato Grosso and the 83,381 hectares (206,040 acres) Manicoré State Forest in Amazonas, a sustainable use conservation unit created in 2005. It continues north east from the state forest before joining the Roosevelt river.

== See also ==
- List of rivers of Amazonas
- List of rivers of Mato Grosso

== Sources ==
- ESEC do Rio Madeirinha (in Portuguese), ISA: Instituto Socioambiental
- FES de Manicoré (in Portuguese), ISA: Instituto Socioambiental
