= Presidente Kennedy, Espírito Santo =

- Municipality
- The Municipality of Presidente Kennedy
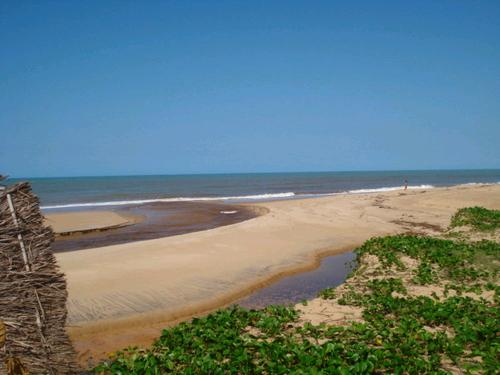
- Marobá Beach

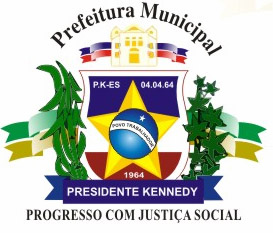
- Flag Coat of arms
- Nickname: "terra do extremo sul" (extremy south land)
- Motto: "Antes sonho agora realidade" (Before, a dream, now, a reality)
- Location of Presidente Kennedy in the State of Espírito Santo
- Coordinates: 21°05′56″S 41°02′48″W
- Country: Brazil
- State: Espírito Santo
- Region: Southeast
- Founded: December 11, 1953

Government
  - Mayor: Amanda Quinta Rangel (SDD, 2013-2016)

Area
  - Total: 583.9 km^{2} (225.4 sq mi)
- Elevation: 55 m (180 ft)

Population (2020)
  - Total: 11,658
  - Density: 19.97/km^{2} (51.71/sq mi)
- Time zone: UTC−3 (BRT)
- HDI (2000): 0.674 – medium
- Website: presidentekennedy.es.gov.br

Presidente Kennedy is a coastal municipality located in the southernmost portion Brazilian state of Espírito Santo. It covers 583.9 km^{2} (225.4 mi^{2}), and has a population of 11,658 with a population density of 19 inhabitants per square kilometer. It is located at 55 meters above sea level. It was named after U.S. president John F. Kennedy, in a tribute to his persona. The city received donations from Alliance for Progress plan.

In recent years, an oil well was discovered in the ocean just in front of the city who was awarded with a heat economy. The oil is under the pre-salt layer. Companies such as the Chinese Baosteel operate in the city, and a new seaport is under construction.

== See also ==
- Alliance for Progress
- Presidente Kennedy, Tocantins
- List of memorials to John F. Kennedy
