= Rio Roosevelt Ecological Station =

Ecological station in Mato Grosso, Brazil

- Estação Ecológica do Rio Roosevelt
- IUCN category Ia (strict nature reserve)
- Location within Brazil
- Nearest city: Machadinho d'Oeste, Rondônia
- Coordinates: 8°56′38″S 60°53′49″W
- Area: 96,925 hectares (239,510 acres)
- Designation: Ecological station
- Created: 4 November 1997

The Rio Roosevelt Ecological Station (Portuguese: Estação Ecológica do Rio Roosevelt) is an ecological station in the state of Mato Grosso, Brazil.

== Location ==
The Rio Roosevelt Ecological Station (ESEC) has an area of 96,925 hectares (239,510 acres). It is in the municipality of Colniza in the state of Mato Grosso. It is bordered by the Tucumã State Park to the west, by the Roosevelt River to the east, and by the border between the states of Mato Grosso and Amazonas to the north. It adjoins the 83,381 hectares (206,040 acres) Manicoré State Forest in Amazonas, a sustainable use conservation unit created in 2005. The MT-206 road runs through the southern part of the ESEC. The ESEC is home to 30 people from one family, living in three communities. There are two archaeological sites in the unit.

The Rio Roosevelt Ecological Station is a unit of the Southern Amazon Mosaic of conservation units. The ESEC would be in the proposed South Amazon Ecotones Ecological Corridor. It is the responsibility of the Conservation Units Coordinator (CUCO) of the Mato Grosso Secretariat of State for the Environment. The ESEC is supported by the Amazon Region Protected Areas Program.

== History ==
A series of executive decrees and state laws have defined and redefined the area of the Rio Roosevelt Ecological Station. The ecological station was created by decree 1.798 of 4 November 1997 with an area of about 80,915 hectares (199,950 acres) with the purpose of conserving samples of the ecological systems in their natural state, ensuring biological diversity and providing controlled opportunities for education and scientific research. Law 7162 of 23 August 1999 created the ecological station with an area of about 53,000 hectares (130,000 acres) in the municipality of Aripuanã.

Law 8.680 of 13 July 2007 expanded the ecological station to an area of about 96,168 hectares (237,640 acres), and also expanded the Guariba-Roosevelt extractive reserve to about 138,092 hectares (341,230 acres) in the Colniza municipality. The expansion was to compensate for settlements in the "4 Reservas" area of the municipalities of Terra Nova do Norte and Nova Guarita. The extractive reserve was later occupied by illegal squatters, and was revoked by a judicial order in 2013, confirmed by the state legislature in January 2015. The judge stated that the lack of environmental protection in the extractive reserve was causing it to be devastated, and it could not be considered compensation for the loss of the "4 Reservas".

Law 10261 of 22 January 2015 repealed Law 8.680 of 13 July 2007, returning the ecological reserve to an area of 53,000 hectares (130,000 acres). Decree 58 of 13 April 2015 redefined the area of the ecological station as about 96,925 hectares (239,510 acres) with a perimeter of 150 kilometres (93 mi) in the municipality of Colniza.

== Environment ==
The Rio Roosevelt Ecological Station is in the Amazon biome. The ecological station is in one of the most pristine areas of Amazon rainforest in Mato Grosso, away from the zone of agricultural expansion, with sparse population and little deforestation. The land in the south of the unit has low fertility and contains large areas of flooded land, helping to protect the unit. Altitudes generally range from 90 to 140 metres (300 to 460 ft), but the Serra da Fortaleza rises to 340 metres (1,120 ft) and the Serra do Pirangueiro rises to 300 metres (980 ft). The terrain contains plateaus with steep edges, hills, valleys and plains. Vegetation is mainly rainforest with tall trees of varying density in the wetter areas. Higher up the vegetation is mainly cerrado.

The main problem in the reserve is predatory fishing, which is estimated to take at least three tons of fish annually. The main threats in the region are logging and illegal mining.

== Sources ==
- Amazon Biome: protected areas: Coordinated audit, Brasília: Federal Court of Accounts of Brazil, 2014
- Ayres, José Márcio; Da Fonseca, Gustavo A. B.; Rylands, Anthony B.; Queiroz, Helder L.; Pinto, Luiz Paulo; Masterson, Donald; Cavalcanti, Roberto B. (2005), Os Corredores Ecológicos das Florestas Tropicais do Brasil (PDF) (in Portuguese), Sociedade Civil Mamirauá, archived from the original (PDF) on 2016-07-31
- Desenvolvimento sustentavel no noroeste de Mato Grosso (PDF) (in Portuguese), WWF Brasil, February 2012
- ESEC do Rio Roosevelt (in Portuguese), ISA: Instituto Socioambiental
- FES de Manicoré (in Portuguese), ISA: Instituto Socioambiental
- Full list: PAs supported by ARPA, ARPA
- Sai portaria que cria o Mosaico da Amazônia Meridional (in Portuguese), ICMBio, 26 August 2011
- Unidades de Conservação - Mosaico da Amazônia Meridional, ICMBio
