= Rio Madeirinha Ecological Station =

Ecological station in Mato Grosso, Brazil

- Estação Ecológica do Rio Madeirinha
- IUCN category Ia (strict nature reserve)
- Location within Brazil
- Nearest city: Aripuanã, Mato Grosso
- Coordinates: 8°57′41″S 61°15′36″W
- Area: 13,682.96 hectares (33,811.3 acres)
- Designation: Ecological station
- Created: 4 November 1997

Rio Madeirinha Ecological Station (Portuguese: Estação Ecológica do Rio Madeirinha) is an ecological station (ESEC) in the state of Mato Grosso, Brazil.

== Location ==
The Rio Madeirinha Ecological Station has an area of about 13,682.96 hectares (33,811.3 acres) in the municipality of Colniza (Note: The municipality of Colniza was created from part of the municipality of Aripuanã in 1998.), Mato Grosso. It is in the north west of the state, and is bordered on the east, north and west by the Tucumã State Park. The Madeirinha River, which runs in the roughly north east direction, defines the border with the west part of the state park.

The ESEC is in the Amazon biome. The predominant vegetation is open tropical rainforest, with trees over 25 metres (82 ft) high. It is a natural refuge for wildlife. The dissected relief forms a variety of habitats for diverse fauna and flora.

== Conservation ==
The Rio Madeirinha Ecological Station (ESEC) was created by the governor of Mato Grosso in decree 1.799 of 4 November 1997. At that time it was in the municipality of Aripuanã, Mato Grosso. The purpose was to conserve samples of the ecosystem, conserve bioldiversity and provide opportunities for education and scientific research. Law 7163 of 23 August 1999 confirmed this creation. An advisory council was appointed on 18 December 2014.

The ESEC is in a sparsely populated area of the state outside the agro-pastoral expansion area of northern Mato Grosso and north west Rondônia, but may be vulnerable to logging and mining, which takes place in the surrounding region. At time of creation just 0.2% of the unit was deforested. This had risen to 0.5% in 2002 and 2% in 2005. The ESEC would be in the proposed South Amazon Ecotones Ecological Corridor.

== Sources ==
- Amazon Biome: protected areas: Coordinated audit, Brasília: Federal Court of Accounts of Brazil, 2014
- Ayres, José Márcio; Da Fonseca, Gustavo A. B.; Rylands, Anthony B.; Queiroz, Helder L.; Pinto, Luiz Paulo; Masterson, Donald; Cavalcanti, Roberto B. (2005), Os Corredores Ecológicos das Florestas Tropicais do Brasil (PDF) (in Portuguese), Sociedade Civil Mamirauá, archived from the original (PDF) on 2016-07-31
- ESEC do Rio Madeirinha (in Portuguese), ISA: Instituto Socioambiental
- Roberta dos Santos; Laurent Micol; Gustavo Irgang; Jane Vasconcellos (September 2006), O desmatamento nas Unidades de Conservação em Mato Grosso (PDF) (in Portuguese), Instituto Centro de Vida - ICV, archived from the original (PDF) on 2016-09-24
