= Colniza =

- Municipality
- The Municipality of Colniza
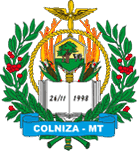
- Coat of arms

- Location of Colniza
- Coordinates: 09°32′38″S 57°26′56″W
- Country: Brazil
- Region: Central-West
- State: Mato Grosso
- Founded: November 26, 1998

Government
  - Mayor: Sergio Bastos Dos Santos (PMBD)

Area
  - Total: 27,947.646 km^{2} (10,790.646 sq mi)
- Elevation: 0 m (0 ft)

Population (2020)
  - Total: 39,861
  - Density: 0.5/km^{2} (1.3/sq mi)
- Time zone: UTC−3 (BRT)

Colniza is a municipality in the state of Mato Grosso, Brazil.

== Demographics ==
Colniza has the highest homicide rate in Brazil with 165 deaths per year per 100 thousand inhabitants. It is the westernmost and largest (by area) municipality of the state.

== Conservation ==
The municipality of Colniza has a mosaic of conservation units consisting of the Rio Madeirinha Ecological Station, the Rio Roosevelt Ecological Station, the Tucumã State Park and the Guariba-Roosevelt Extractive Reserve.

Satellite monitoring showed that Colniza had the highest level of deforestation in Mato Grosso in the six years from 2010 to 2016, with 78,556 hectares (194,120 acres) cleared, most of it illegally. Rates of deforestation rose successively in 2013, 2014 and 2015.

The 13,683-hectare (33,810-acre) Rio Madeirinha Ecological Station is a fully protected environmental unit created in 1997. The 96,925-hectare (239,510-acre) Rio Roosevelt Ecological Station is a strictly protected conservation unit created in 1997. The 164,224-hectare (405,810-acre) Guariba-Roosevelt Extractive Reserve is a sustainable use unit created in 1996. The municipality also contains 3,641-hectare (9,000-acre) of the Campos Amazônicos National Park, a 961,318-hectare (2,375,470-acre) protected area created in 2006 that protects an unusual enclave of cerrado vegetation in the Amazon rainforest. It contains 44% of the 227,817-hectare (562,950-acre) Igarapés do Juruena State Park, created in 2002.

== Sources ==
- "Câmara Setorial mantém área da Resex Guariba-Roosevelt, em Colniza", Portal Amazonia (in Portuguese), 17 March 2016, archived from the original on 25 June 2016
- ESEC do Rio Madeirinha (in Portuguese), ISA: Instituto Socioambiental
- ESEC do Rio Roosevelt (in Portuguese), ISA: Instituto Socioambiental
- Lisandra Paraguassú (2007-02-28), Pequenas cidades, muitos crimes (in Portuguese), O Estado de S. Paulo
- PARNA dos Campos Amazônicos (in Portuguese), ISA: Instituto Socioambiental
- PES Igarapés do Juruena (in Portuguese), ISA: Instituto Socioambiental
- RESEX Guariba-Roosevelt (in Portuguese), ISA: Instituto Socioambiental
- Tom Phillips (2008-01-25), Amazon's rescue reversed, The Guardian
