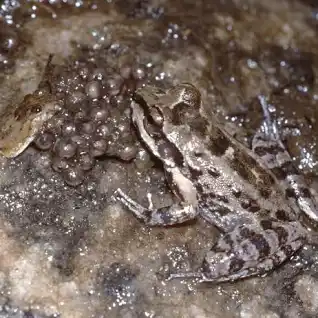

Scientific classification
- Kingdom: Animalia
- Phylum: Chordata
- Class: Amphibia
- Order: Anura
- Family: Cycloramphidae
- Genus: Thoropa
- Species: T. taophora

Binomial name
- Thoropa taophora (Miranda-Ribeiro, 1923)

Synonyms
- Ololigon abbreviatus subsp. taophora Miranda-Ribeiro, 1923

= Thoropa taophora =

Species of frog

Thoropa taophora, also known as the rock frog, is a species of frog in the family Cycloramphidae. These frogs are native to Brazil and Paraguay, where they inhabit the mountains and coastal areas within the State of São Paulo. They are also one of many species to live in the great global diversity hotspot of the Brazilian-Paraguayan Tropical Atlantic Forest.

Territoriality is an important behavior for adult T. taophora males. Male individuals compete to monopolize breeding sites, which ultimately defines their reproductive success. Rates of survival for T. taophora offspring depend heavily on choosing the correct egg laying site. Egg clutches are typically laid in an environment containing flowing freshwater on a rocky surface, giving the frog its general name.

An interesting characteristic of T. taophora tadpoles is their cannibalistic behavior towards clutches laid by other females apart from their mother's. This comes as a result of the lack of adequate breeding sites that males choose from likely due to the increasing biome fragmentation, such as that of the Brazilian Atlantic Forest. Hence, males primarily participate in egg guarding to ensure the greatest survival rate for their offspring.

== Description ==
Thoropa taophora tadpoles are dorsoventrally flat with a tail reaching a max length that makes up 70 percent of the animals total body length. The end of metamorphosis is marked with the total reabsorption of the individual's tail. T. taophora frogs, like many other anurans, have highly permeable skin which greatly increases their risk of dehydration and may restrict locomotor performance.

Thoropa taophora fall under the T. Miliaris group, and differ from their sibling groups in their restrictive habitat preferences including the eastern mountains and costal areas in the State of São Paulo. The T. miliaris subgroup differs from the T. petropolitana group in their medium to large (more than 35 mm) adult body sizes. Moreover, their males have nuptial spines on their second, third and fourth fingers and tadpoles have reduced abdominal discs.

== Habitat and distribution ==
=== Geographical distribution ===
This species is primarily found scattered along the coast of the State of São Paulo, Brazil. They have been found in costal places such as Mongaguá, São Sebastião, Ubatuba, Caraguatatuba, Paranapiacaba and Anchieta, and the Vitória and Búzios islands. They also reside in slightly more inland places in the State of Paraná, such as the Biological Station of Boracéia (Salesópolis) and Cubatão.

=== Habitat ===
Their geographical location on the coast of Brazil places them primarily within the Brazilian Atlantic Forest—a global biodiversity hotspot with assorted habitats primarily due to its great latitudinal range and complex topography. This forest houses more than 500 frog species, which is almost ten percent of the world's anuran species. More specifically, Thoropa taophora choose eastern mountains and coastal areas in São Paulo.

== Conservation ==
=== Habitat loss ===
The Brazilian Atlantic Forest, where this species primarily lives, is one of the most fragmented biomes in the world. Fragmentation of natural habitats is one of the top threats of biodiversity, greatly harming the species within this forest due to the decrease in overall habitat availability and quality in addition to changes in spatial configuration. This can lead to erosion of neutral and adaptive genetic diversity populations because of decreasing population size and inter-population interactions. Due to this, there is a higher chance of genetic drift, more inbreeding, lower evolutionary potential, and an overall higher risk of extinction.

== Reproduction and life cycle ==
Thoropa taophora tadpoles feed and develop in freshwater seeps as semiterrestrial animals.

== Mating ==
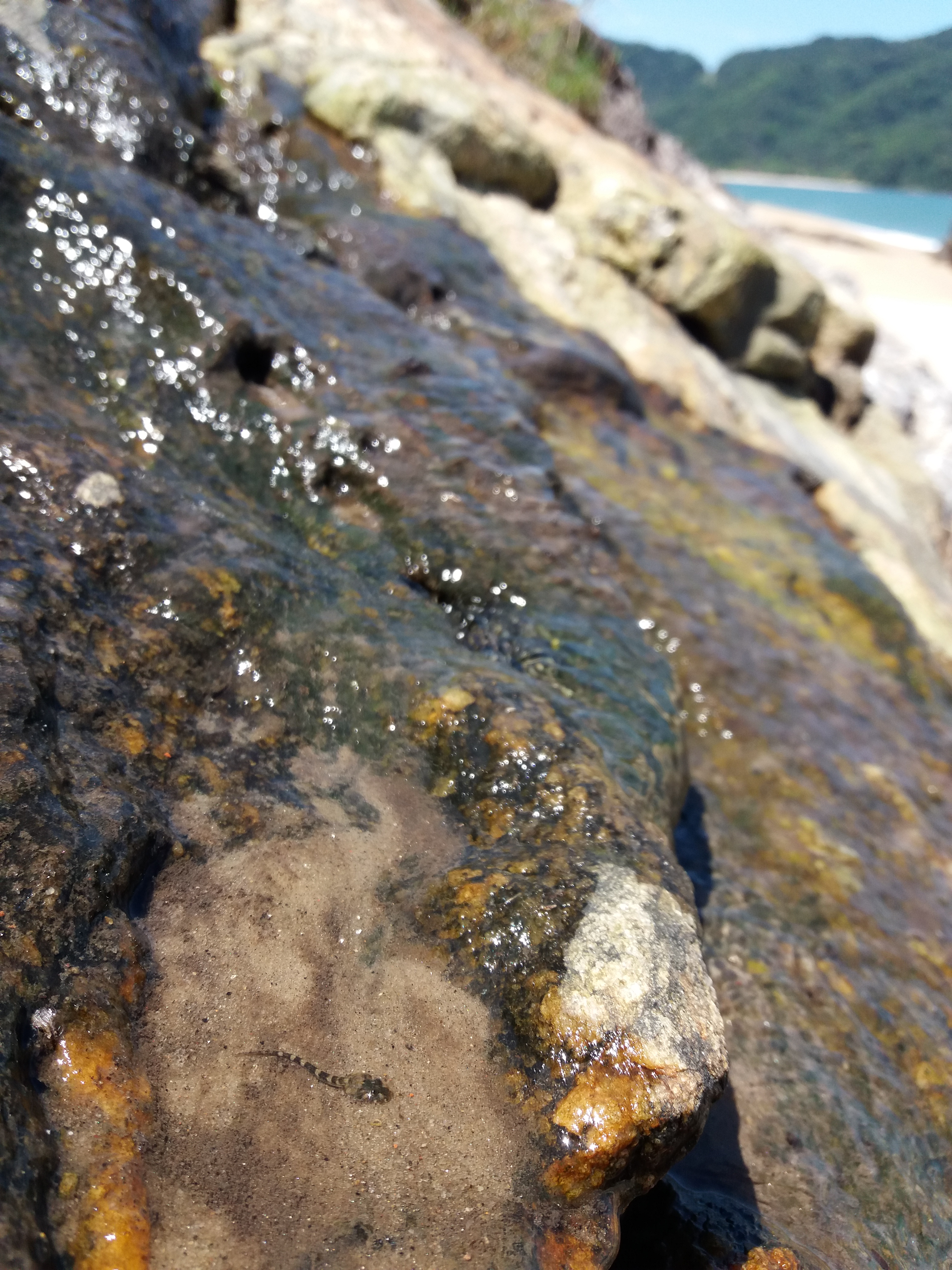
A typical breeding site of the species Thoropa taophora

=== Male/male interactions ===
Thoropa taophora males exhibit a strong competitive nature and great territoriality. Mating is heavily dependent on the aggressive defense displayed by male individuals due to scarce breeding sites. Monopolization of breeding sites comes as a result, thus leading to few, highly fit males dominating the reproductive scene.

=== Mate searching behavior ===
Males attract females with a mating call. Females search for males that have claimed territoriality over an environment that contains damp rock walls, such as freshwater seeps. This is because the semi-terrestrial tadpoles require both water in addition to rock substrate to be able to develop.

=== Female/male interactions ===
There have been three observed tactics that display Thoropa taophora courtship. The first is that the female approaches and positions herself under the male with her back towards him. The second is that the male approaches the female and amplects her. The third is the situation in which the female begins cannibalizing already laid eggs, therefore pushing the male to either chase her off or amplecting her.

== Parental care ==
=== Oviposition ===
Oviposition of these egg clutches usually occurs in flowing freshwater on a rocky surface of outcrops and rocky shores. This location is chosen because of its moist nature needed to keep eggs alive but is also a harsh environment for parents to survive in due to its direct sunlight exposure which can cause severe physiological strains.

=== Egg guarding ===
Males guard egg clutches after mating with females. Males typically abandon the egg clutches during the day to hide away in rock crevices that can protect against dehydration, since amphibians have very permeable skin and are highly susceptible to becoming dehydrated.

=== Site selection for egg laying ===
Females often mate with males in a polygynous relationship. This is primarily due to the scarcity of adequate breeding sites, therefore forcing females to mate and deposit clutches with a singular male. Once hatched, Thoropa taophora tadpoles will feed on clutches from other females (excluding their own clutch) in a cannibalistic manner. Alternatively, females may mate with a male on a slightly worse breeding site, yet run the risk of higher offspring mortality.

Site selection for egg laying therefore becomes a difficult decision since both egg-laying sites have potential detrimental effects on a female's reproductive success.

== Phylogeny ==
Rock frogs are anurans in the genus Thoropa, and part of the Cycloramphidae family. There are six species native to Brazil: Thoropa miliaris, T. petropolitana, T. taophora, T. lutzi, T. megatympanum, and T. saxatilis. All but T. megatympanum reside in primarily rocky areas, giving them their name. T. taophora are classified as monophyletic, meaning this species likely descended from one ancestor.

T. taophora has three sub lineages—tao-1, tao-2, and tao-3. Tao-1 primarily exists in the northern coastal region of the State of São Paulo, while tao-2 inhabits the southern coastal region. The tao-3 sub lineage is found in the Estação Ecológica Juréia-Itatins in the south of the State of São Paulo.

== Physiology ==
=== Locomotion ===
==== Tadpole locomotion ====
T. taophora tadpoles are able to survive in close to maximal critical temperatures reported for all anurans, but still stay below values reported for other species' tadpoles. The highest recorded temperature of activity reached was 36.4 degrees Celsius, which falls in the higher end for subtropical species. Tadpoles of smaller size can sustain higher temperatures than their larger counterparts. This potentially explains lower locomotive performance coming from larger tadpoles in natural conditions.

Smaller tadpoles likely experience greater locomotor activity because their muscle performance and energy metabolism does not sensitively fluctuate due to environmental temperature changes. This adaptation to thermal changes has many ecological advantages, including increasing physiological processes such as digestion and growth for tadpoles. Because larger tadpoles may not have this locomotor performance advantage in higher temperatures, jumping might be an alternative to escape predation.

== Diet ==
Although adult, juvenile and froglet T. taophora inhabit the same environments, their diets slightly differ due to size and age of the frog at the time. A reason behind the differing diets could be the individual's mouth opening range. Furthermore, adults tend to be more stationary compared to juveniles and froglets, which might explain these differences.

=== Adults vs juveniles vs froglets ===
The diet of adults is primarily dominated by the consumption of ants. Adult T. taophora also prey on beetles and grasshoppers. Juveniles ate much of the same diet as adults. Froglets consume a wide variety of prey, such as ants, springtails, flies and mites. Springtails are typically consumed in the wet season, while mites are more often preyed upon in the dry season.

=== Females vs males ===
Females were reported to eat more marine isopods, trichopteran nymphs, and orthopterans. Males followed the general trend of primarily eating ants. These differences might be due to males searching for prey on land, while females actively search for prey by wandering close to the seashore.

=== Seasonal effects ===
During the dry season, males were observed to eat more ants. During the wet season, males were observed to eat more marine isopods while females ate more ants and grasshoppers. While males are more stationary during the wet season since it coincides with the breeding period of this species, their increased consumption of marine species might be explained by the higher tides and more extreme weather conditions during this time of year.

== Enemies ==
=== Predators ===
Trap-jaw ants (O. haematodus) prey on the semi-terrestrial tadpoles of the rock frog T. taophora. These ants have enlarged mandibles that can quickly strike a prey to immobilize them. This causes the tadpole to be unable to move away and ultimately die at the hands of this insect. Physical contact with this ant species is the only thing that causes tadpoles to attempt to flee through jumping, therefore showing that this species has no specialized way to avoid this predation.
