= Tinguá Biological Reserve =

Protected area in Brazil

- Reserva Biológica do Tinguá
- IUCN category Ia (strict nature reserve)
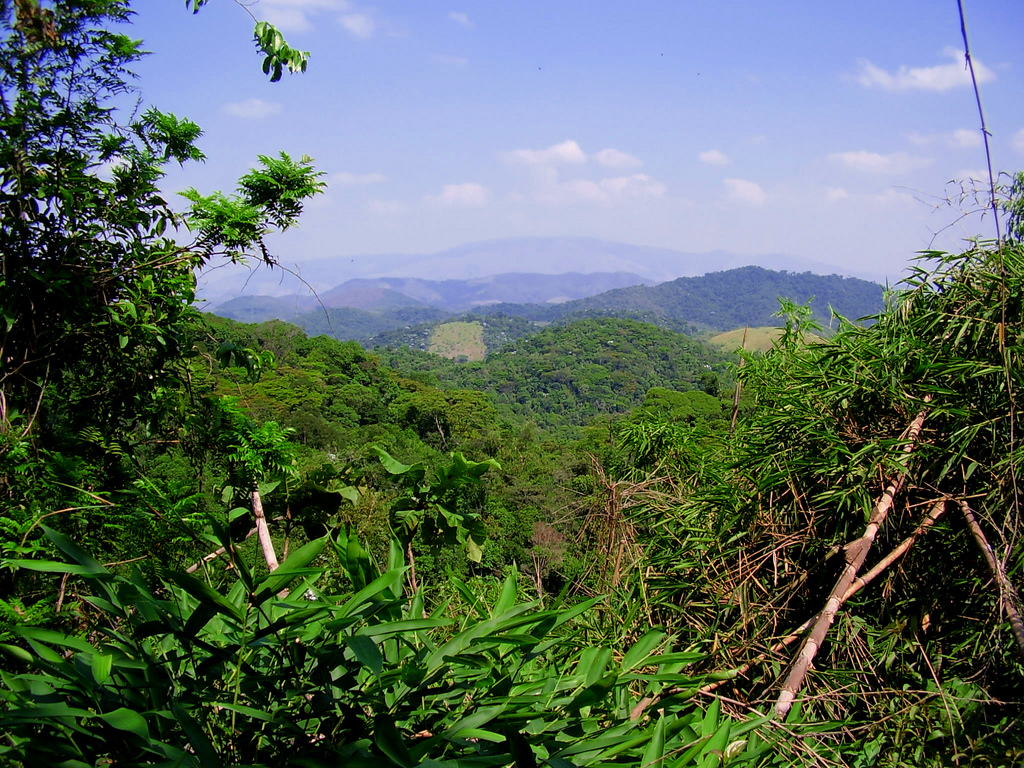
- Serra do Tinguá mountains

- Location within Brazil
- Location: Rio de Janeiro State
- Nearest city: Rio de Janeiro
- Coordinates: 22.545°S 43.385°W
- Area: 26,260 hectares (64,900 acres)
- Designation: Biological reserve
- Created: 23 May 1989

Tinguá Biological Reserve (Portuguese: Reserva Biológica do Tinguá) is a biological reserve in the Serra do Tinguá mountains, Rio de Janeiro state, eastern Brazil.

== Location ==
The reserve, which covers 26,260 hectares (64,900 acres), was created on 23 May 1989. It is administered by the Chico Mendes Institute for Biodiversity Conservation. The reserve lies in the municipalities of Duque de Caxias, Nova Iguaçu and Petrópolis in Rio de Janeiro State. It adjoins the 2,353 hectares (5,810 acres) Jaceruba Environmental Protection Area, created in 2002, to the west. The biome is Atlantic Forest and includes submontane, montane and upper montane rain forest. The reserve is in the Central Rio de Janeiro Atlantic Forest Mosaic, created in 2006.

== Conservation ==
The biological reserve is a "strict nature reserve" under the IUCN protected area category Ia. The purpose is to fully protect the area’s biodiversity and other natural resources without direct human interference.

Protected species in the reserve include the southern muriqui (Brachyteles arachnoides), red myotis (Myotis ruber), Recife broad-nosed bat (Platyrrhinus recifinus), South American ocelot (Leopardus pardalis mitis), South American puma (Puma c. concolor), and rare frogs such as Thoropa petropolitana and T. lutzi. Bird species include the Chaco eagle (Harpyhaliaetus coronatus), grey-winged cotinga (Tijuca condita), Salvadori's antwren (Myrmotherula minor), white-necked hawk (Leucopternis lacernulatus) and the white-eared parakeet (Pyrrhura leucotis).

== Sources ==
- APA Jaceruba (in Portuguese), Biblioteca Virtual do Meio Ambiente da Baixada Fluminense
- Costa, Cláudia; Lamas, Ivana; Fernandes, Rosan (December 2010), Planejamento Estratégico do Mosaico Central Fluminense (PDF) (in Portuguese), Reserva da Biosfera da Mata Atlântica
- Rebio do Tinguá (in Portuguese), Chico Mendes Institute for Biodiversity Conservation
- Unidade de Conservação: Reserva Biológica do Tinguá (in Portuguese), MMA: Ministério do Meio Ambiente
