= Cycloramphus cedrensis =

Conservation status
- Data Deficient (IUCN 3.1)

Scientific classification
- Kingdom: Animalia
- Phylum: Chordata
- Class: Amphibia
- Order: Anura
- Family: Cycloramphidae
- Genus: Cycloramphus
- Species: C. cedrensis

Binomial name
- Cycloramphus cedrensis Heyer, 1983

Species of frog

Cycloramphus cedrensis is a species of frog in the family Cycloramphidae. It is endemic to southern Brazil and is only known from its type locality near Rio dos Cedros, Santa Catarina. Common name Cedros button frog has been coined for it.

== Description ==
Adult males measure 40–44 mm (1.6–1.7 in) and adult females 42–50 mm (1.7–2.0 in) in snout–vent length. The snout is rounded. The tympanum is hidden. The toes have relatively well-developed webbing. The dorsum is brown with indistinct mottling. The sides of body and posterior surface of thighs bear distinctive small yellow dots. The chin and chest have small white dots on a maroon background. The iris is very dark brown.

The male advertisement call consists of sporadic, single notes. The call is short, lasting about 0.1 seconds. The maximum energy is at 1100–1400 Hz.

== Habitat and conservation ==
Cycloramphus cedrensis is known from fast-flowing rocky streams in rainforest at elevations of 300–350 m (980–1,150 ft) above sea level. The tadpole are found on rocks in the splash zone.

The type series was collected in 1982. As of 2004, later surveys had not found the species. It is threatened by habitat loss caused by logging and development of hydroelectricity infrastructure. It is not known to occur in any protected areas

Cycloramphus cedrensis is only known from near Rio dos Cedros, Santa Catarina.
