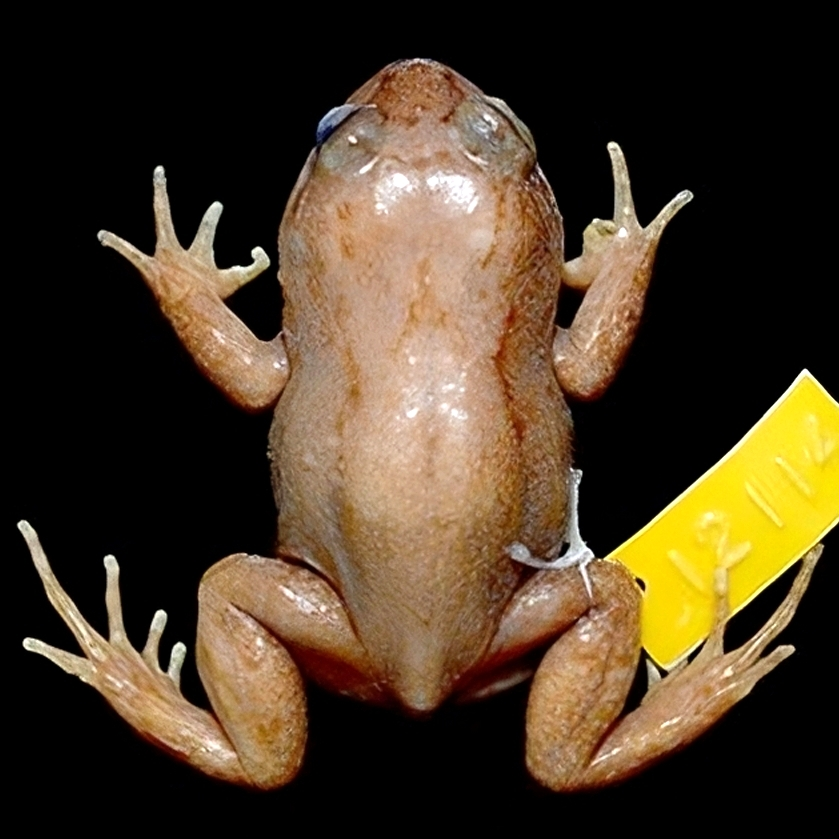

Conservation status
- Critically endangered, possibly extinct (IUCN 3.1)

Scientific classification
- Kingdom: Animalia
- Phylum: Chordata
- Class: Amphibia
- Order: Anura
- Family: Cycloramphidae
- Genus: Cycloramphus
- Species: C. stejnegeri

Binomial name
- Cycloramphus stejnegeri (Noble, 1924)

Synonyms
- Borborocoetes stejnegeri Noble, 1924; Craspedoglossa stejnegeri (Noble, 1924); Zachaenus stejnegeri (Noble, 1924)

= Cycloramphus stejnegeri =

Species of frog

Cycloramphus stejnegeri is a species of frog in the family Cycloramphidae. It is endemic to the Serra dos Órgãos in southeastern Brazil. The specific name stejnegeri honors Leonhard Stejneger, a Norwegian–American herpetologist and ornithologist. Common name Stejneger's button frog has been coined for this species.

== Description ==
Adult males measure 45–47 mm (1.8–1.9 in) and adult females 45–56 mm (1.8–2.2 in) in snout–vent length. The snout is rounded or vertically sloping in profile. The toes have no webbing nor fringes. The dorsum is smooth or granular, usually having regular dorsal ridges. Coloration is non-distinctive and the dorsum may be uniform or have chevron-like markings. The posterior surface of the thigh has small or larger distinct light spots.

== Habitat ==
Cycloramphus stejnegeri is a terrestrial species. It occurs in Atlantic forest; the holotype was collected from 1,500 m (4,900 ft) above sea level. It is not associated with bodies of water. It is usually found under leaf litter but sometimes also in burrows. The eggs are deposited under leaf litter in burrows or under logs; the tadpoles are terrestrial and live away from water. This species has not been found in disturbed habitats.

The frog's range is within Serra dos Órgãos National Park.

== Threats ==
The IUCN classifies Cycloramphus stejnegeri as critically endangered and possibly extinct, with no more than 50 mature adults alive at any one time. Few humans, primarily hikers, visit its habitat. Scientists suspect chytridiomycosis, but they have yet to confirm this.
