= Cycloramphus asper =

Conservation status
- Data Deficient (IUCN 3.1)

Scientific classification
- Kingdom: Animalia
- Phylum: Chordata
- Class: Amphibia
- Order: Anura
- Family: Cycloramphidae
- Genus: Cycloramphus
- Species: C. asper

Binomial name
- Cycloramphus asper Werner, 1899

Species of frog

Cycloramphus asper is a species of frog in the family Cycloramphidae. It is endemic to Brazil.

== Habitat ==
This frog is found in fragments of Atlantic Forest, in and near fast-flowing streams. Scientists have seen this frog between 300 m (980 ft) and 800 m (2,600 ft) above sea level.

Scientists have reported this frog in a protected place, Reserva Particular Do Patrimônio Natural Parque Ecologico Artex.

== Reproduction ==
The tadpoles are found on rocks in the splash zones of the same streams where the adults live.

== Threats ==
The IUCN classifies this frog as data deficient. They do not know what caused so many of the frogs to disappear from their range. Overtourism is one possibility.
