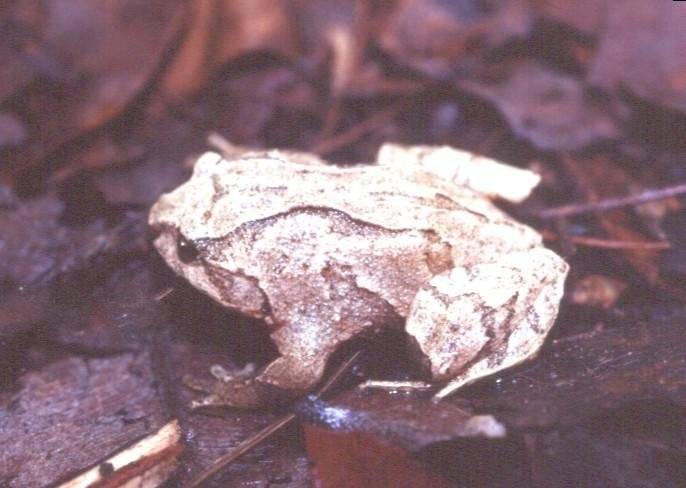

Conservation status
- Least Concern (IUCN 3.1)

Scientific classification
- Kingdom: Animalia
- Phylum: Chordata
- Class: Amphibia
- Order: Anura
- Family: Cycloramphidae
- Genus: Zachaenus
- Species: Z. parvulus

Binomial name
- Zachaenus parvulus (Girard, 1853)

Synonyms
- Cystignathus parvulus Girard, 1853; Oocormus microps Boulenger, 1905; Ceratophrys fusciventris Lutz, 1926; Leptodactylus parvulus (Girard, 1853)

= Zachaenus parvulus =

Species of frog

Zachaenus parvulus (common names: Girard's frog, Rio bug-eyed frog) is a species of frog in the family Cycloramphidae. It is endemic to southeastern Brazil and is known from the eastern São Paulo, Rio de Janeiro, and Espírito Santo states.

Its natural habitats primary and secondary forests where it lives in the leaf-litter on the forest floor. It is a common species. Habitat loss might pose some threat to it.
