= Cycloramphus fuliginosus =

Conservation status
- Least Concern (IUCN 3.1)

Scientific classification
- Kingdom: Animalia
- Phylum: Chordata
- Class: Amphibia
- Order: Anura
- Family: Cycloramphidae
- Genus: Cycloramphus
- Species: C. fuliginosus

Binomial name
- Cycloramphus fuliginosus Tschudi, 1838

Synonyms
- Cycloramphus fulginosus Tschudi, 1838

Species of amphibian

Cycloramphus fuliginosus is a species of frog in the family Cycloramphidae. It is endemic to southeastern Brazil and known from the Atlantic coastal forest between southeastern Bahia and Rio de Janeiro. Its common name is Tschudi's button frog. The specific name was originally spelled as fulginosus, but the incorrect subsequent spelling fuliginosus by André Marie Constant Duméril and Gabriel Bibron (1841) was followed by later authors and is now preserved on the basis of prevailing usage.

== Habitat ==
This nocturnal frog is found in primary and secondary forest but not in open areas. People find it on rocks and next to forest streams. Scientists have seen this frog between 0 m (0 ft) and 1,000 m (3,300 ft) above sea level.

Scientists have reported this frog in protected places, including APA de Mangaratiba and PARNA da Tijuca.

== Reproduction ==
The tadpoles develop in or on splash-zone rocks next to the same streams in which the adults live.

== Threats ==
The IUCN classifies this frog as least concern of extinction. In some parts of their range, the frogs are in some danger from habitat loss in favor of urbanization, agriculture, silviculture, and cattle.
