= Cycloramphus faustoi =

Conservation status
- Vulnerable (IUCN 3.1)

Scientific classification
- Kingdom: Animalia
- Phylum: Chordata
- Class: Amphibia
- Order: Anura
- Family: Cycloramphidae
- Genus: Cycloramphus
- Species: C. faustoi

Binomial name
- Cycloramphus faustoi Brasileiro, Haddad, Sawaya, and Sazima, 2007

Species of frog

Cycloramphus faustoi is a species of frog in the family Cycloramphidae. It is endemic to Ilha dos Alcatrazes, a small island about 35 km off the coast of São Paulo state, Brazil.

== Description ==
Adult males measure 31–38 mm (1.2–1.5 in) and adult females 42–44 mm (1.7–1.7 in) in snout–vent length. The body is robust. The head is wider than it is long. The snout is truncate and the eyes are protruding. The tympanum is not visible externally (but becomes visible if skin is removed); the supra-tympanic fold is distinct. The fingers and the toes have no webbing nor lateral fringes. The dorsum is dark brown and has a few yellowish or white spots. A narrow light yellow inter-orbital bar is present. The limbs have few white to light yellow bars. The throat is white and has a few brown spots. The belly is immaculate whitish, but some individuals have a few brown spots.

== Habitat and reproduction ==
Cycloramphus faustoi are known from a small valley in a dry stream bed at elevations of 20–100 m (66–328 ft) above sea level. The stream is bordered by Atlantic forest. During the rainy season, the water trickles through this valley. Both males and females were spotted in rock crevices; they were wary and went into hiding when disturbed.

Reproduction seems to occur in August when, following a rainy afternoon, males were heard calling at night and a females found guarding an egg clutch consisting of 31 eggs; the female did not leave even when disturbed.

== Conservation ==
This species appears to be rare within its small range: it is known from an area of about 0.6 km^{2} (0.23 sq mi), while the island itself is not much larger, 1.8 km^{2} (0.69 sq mi); during a single night, at most 11 individuals could be found. This is less than for similar mainland species.

In the past, its habitat was threatened by fires caused by artillery training activities. This practice has now ceased, but climate change, in particular changes in rainfall, could threaten its habitat in the future. Also collection for illegal pet trade is a potential threat.
