= Cycloramphus duseni =

Conservation status
- Data Deficient (IUCN 3.1)

Scientific classification
- Kingdom: Animalia
- Phylum: Chordata
- Class: Amphibia
- Order: Anura
- Family: Cycloramphidae
- Genus: Cycloramphus
- Species: C. duseni

Binomial name
- Cycloramphus duseni (Andersson, 1914)

Synonyms
- Telmatobius duseni Andersson, 1914

Species of frog

Cycloramphus duseni is a species of frog in the family Cycloramphidae. It is endemic to southern Brazil and only known from its type series collected in 1911 from near Casa Ypiranga (or Ipiranga) along the Curitiba–Paranaguá railway, in the Serra do Mar, Paraná state. Prior to naming of Cycloramphus izecksohni in 1983, it was confused with this species. The specific name duseni honors Per Dusén, Swedish naturalist who collected the type series. Common name Ypiranga button frog has been coined for this species.

== Description ==
The type series consists of five specimens, two of which appear to be lost. Two male syntypes at the Swedish Museum of Natural History measure 31–33 mm (1.2–1.3 in) in snout–vent length. The snout is sloping in profile. The toes have reduced webbing. The dorsum bears warts and tubercles; the large warts are sometimes arranged in regular rows. The posterior surface of the thigh has distinct light spots. The belly is yellowish dirty white, although it is unknown whether this refers to living or preserved specimens.

== Habitat and conservation ==
The type series was collected from crevices and cracks in the vertical cliffs at about 600 m (2,000 ft) above sea level. As of 2004, later searches had failed to find the species again. Larval ecology is unknown, but if similar to other Cycloramphus, the larvae live on rocks in the splash zones of streams in rocky areas in and around forest.

Cycloramphus duseni is reported in Pico do Marumbi State Park.
