= Cycloramphus acangatan =

Conservation status
- Vulnerable (IUCN 3.1)

Scientific classification
- Kingdom: Animalia
- Phylum: Chordata
- Class: Amphibia
- Order: Anura
- Family: Cycloramphidae
- Genus: Cycloramphus
- Species: C. acangatan

Binomial name
- Cycloramphus acangatan Verdade and Rodrigues, 2003

Species of amphibian

Cycloramphus acangatan is a species of frog in the family Cycloramphidae. It is endemic to the Serra de Paranapiacaba, the state of São Paulo state, Brazil. The specific name acangatan is derived from the Tupi language words acanga ("head") and atan ("strong") and refers to the strong and massive jaw adductor muscles in this species.

== Description ==
Adult males measure 33–43 mm (1.3–1.7 in) and adult females 44–48 mm (1.7–1.9 in) in snout–vent length. The body is elliptical with short and robust limbs. The eyes are small. No tympanum is externally visible. The supratympanic fold is evident and extends from the back of the eye to the shoulder. Digital tips are not expanded and webbing is absent. Skin is mostly smooth but becomes slightly granular along flanks and in the vicinity of the head; the eyelids have small tubercles. The dorsum is uniformly red brown and has irregular white spots, primarily along the flanks and the dorsal surfaces of thighs. The belly is also uniformly red brown and has irregular white spots. There are light stripes at tip of fingers and toes when viewed from above. Some specimens are lighter (especially juveniles) and have a light bar between the eyelids. Males have conspicuous, rounded, and flattened inguinal gland.

== Habitat and conservation ==
Cycloramphus acangatan lives in Atlantic Forest remnants. These frogs are usually found on the forest floor, far from water bodies. They are abundant in suitable habitat. The larvae are terrestrial.

The Atlantic Forest has suffered from substantial deforestation and fragmentation caused by logging in the past as well as ongoing large-scale clearance for agricultural purposes. The species is known from the Intervales State Park and from the Paranapiacaba and Morro Grande Biological Reserves.
