= Cycloramphus semipalmatus =

Conservation status
- Critically endangered, possibly extinct (IUCN 3.1)

Scientific classification
- Kingdom: Animalia
- Phylum: Chordata
- Class: Amphibia
- Order: Anura
- Family: Cycloramphidae
- Genus: Cycloramphus
- Species: C. semipalmatus

Binomial name
- Cycloramphus semipalmatus (Miranda-Ribeiro, 1920)

Species of frog

Cycloramphus semipalmatus is a species of frog in the family Cycloramphidae.

== Habitat ==
This terrestrial frog in primary and secondary Atlantic forest biomes. Adults and juveniles are both found near water. This frog is found on and under rocks and next to streams. Scientists saw this frog between 0 and 780 m (0 and 2,559 ft) above sea level.

The frog's range overlaps that of a protected area, Parque Estadual Serra do Mar.

== Reproduction ==
Scientists infer that this frog has the same reproductive strategy as many of its congeners: The tadpoles live on rocks covered in water.

== Threats ==
The IUCN classifies this species as critically endangered and possibly extinct, with no more than 50 mature adults project to be alive at any one time. Scientists believe the fungus Batrachochytrium dendrobatidis may have been responsible for the population decline. B. dendrobatidis causes the disease chytridiomycosis, which has killed many other amphibians in South America. Scientists also believe air pollution from nearby cities in the 1970s have killed the frogs through acid rain and other atmospheric effects.
