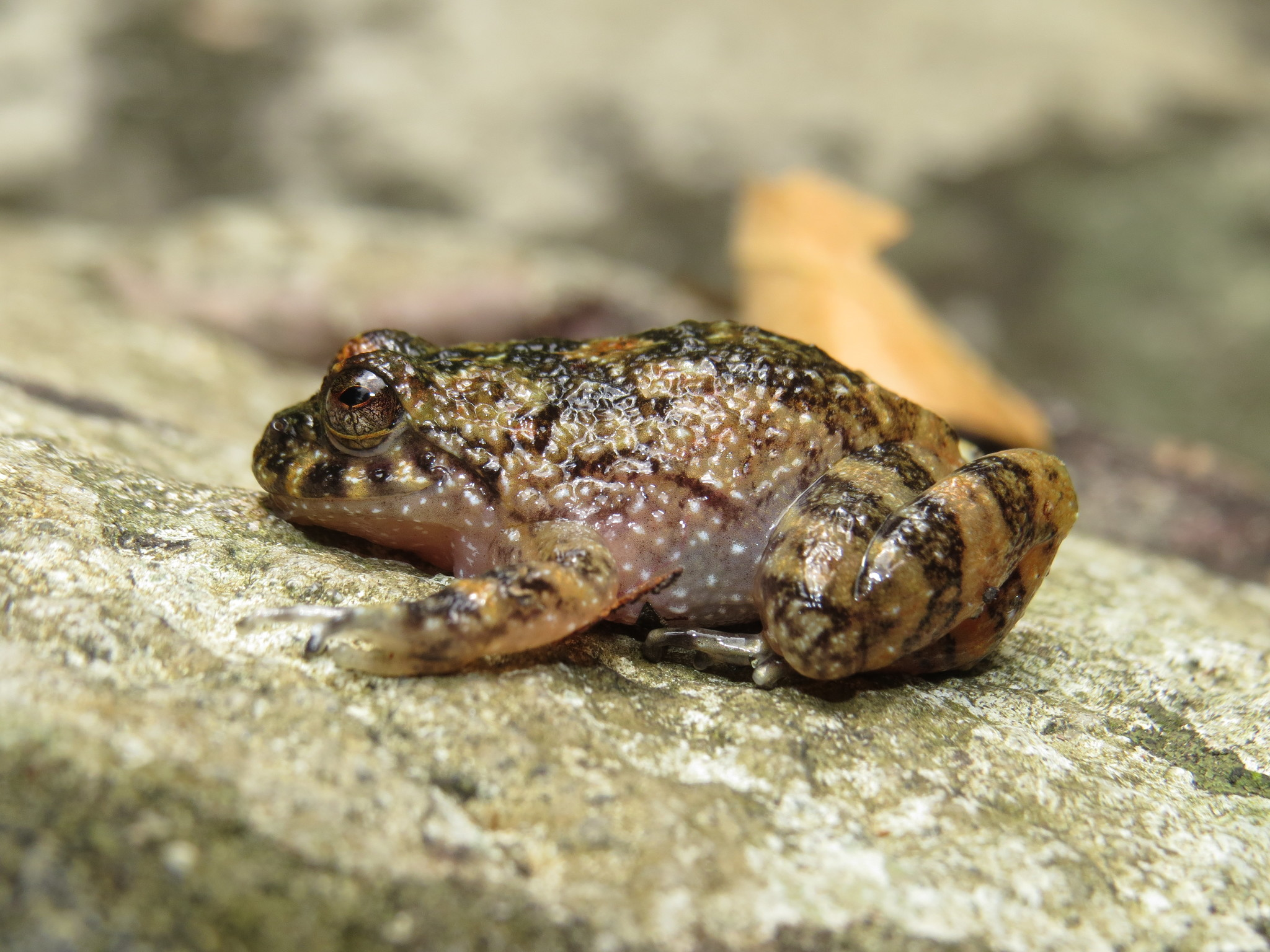

Conservation status
- Endangered (IUCN 3.1)

Scientific classification
- Kingdom: Animalia
- Phylum: Chordata
- Class: Amphibia
- Order: Anura
- Family: Cycloramphidae
- Genus: Cycloramphus
- Species: C. brasiliensis

Binomial name
- Cycloramphus brasiliensis (Steindachner, 1864)

= Cycloramphus brasiliensis =

Species of frog

Cycloramphus brasiliensis is a species of frog in the family Cycloramphidae. It is endemic to Brazil's Rio de Janeiro state.

== Habitat ==
This terrestrial frog is found in primary and strong secondary Atlantic Forests. Both adults and young live near water. Scientists have seen this frog between 800 m (2,600 ft) and 1,200 m (3,900 ft) above sea level.

Scientists have reported this frog in protected places.

== Reproduction ==
The tadpoles are found on rocks that are either covered in a film of water or within the stream's spray zone.

== Threats ==
The IUCN classifies this as endangered. There is not as much suitable forest habitat remaining in Rio de Janeiro as in some other parts of Brazil, and what forest remains is heavily fragmented. The frogs face further habitat loss in favor of urbanization, both cash-crop and small-scale agriculture, silviculture, and cattle. The area was historically subject to wide-scale logging, but this has mostly subsided.
