= Cycloramphus valae =

Conservation status
- Data Deficient (IUCN 3.1)

Scientific classification
- Kingdom: Animalia
- Phylum: Chordata
- Class: Amphibia
- Order: Anura
- Family: Cycloramphidae
- Genus: Cycloramphus
- Species: C. valae

Binomial name
- Cycloramphus valae Heyer, 1983

Species of frog

Cycloramphus valae is a species of frog in the family Cycloramphidae. It is endemic to Brazil. Its natural habitats are subtropical or tropical moist lowland forest and rivers. It is threatened by habitat loss.
