= Cycloramphus ohausi =

Conservation status
- Critically Endangered (IUCN 3.1)

Scientific classification
- Kingdom: Animalia
- Phylum: Chordata
- Class: Amphibia
- Order: Anura
- Family: Cycloramphidae
- Genus: Cycloramphus
- Species: C. ohausi

Binomial name
- Cycloramphus ohausi (Wandolleck, 1907)

Synonyms
- Ceratophrys ohausi Wandolleck, 1907; Cyclorhamphus distinctus Lutz, 1932

Species of frog

Cycloramphus ohausi is a species of frog in the family Cycloramphidae. It is endemic to Serra dos Órgãos in southeastern Brazil. The specific name ohausi honors Friedrich Ohaus, a German physicist and herpetologist. Common name Wandolleck's button frog has been proposed for this species.

== Habitat ==
Cycloramphus ohausi is a forest species associated with streams. It occurs at elevations of 800–1,200 m (2,600–3,900 ft) above sea level. Scientists know it exclusively from two protected areas, Parque Nacional Serra dos Órgãos and Petrópolis Environmental Protection Area.

== Threats ==
The IUCN classifies this frog as critically endangered, with no more than 50 adult frogs alive at the same time. Its range has been subject to considerable habitat conversion in favor of forestry, agriculture, and livestock cultivation. People use fires to both clear forest and maintain farmland, so fires are a threat even within protected parkland. Scientists also suspect the fungus Batrachochytrium dendrobatidis, which has been responsible for many amphibian deaths via the fungal disease chytridiomycosis.
