= Cycloramphus bolitoglossus =

Conservation status
- Least Concern (IUCN 3.1)

Scientific classification
- Kingdom: Animalia
- Phylum: Chordata
- Class: Amphibia
- Order: Anura
- Family: Cycloramphidae
- Genus: Cycloramphus
- Species: C. bolitoglossus

Binomial name
- Cycloramphus bolitoglossus (Werner, 1897)

Species of frog

The Blumenau button frog (Cycloramphus bolitoglossus) is a species of frog in the family Cycloramphidae. It is endemic to Brazil.

== Habitat ==
This frog is found in the states of Paraná and Santa Catarina. It is found in primary and secondary forest but it requires at least some canopy cover and cannot live in non-forest habitats. Scientists have seen this frog between 800 m (2,600 ft) and 1,000 m (3,300 ft) above sea level.

This frog has been reported in protected places.

== Reproduction ==
This animal reproduces through larval development. The larvae are terrestrial.

== Threats ==
The IUCN classifies this frog as least concern of extinction. There is significantly less forest in Paraná and Santa Catarina than in other parts of Brazil, and what is present is heavily fragmented. Portions of the population are in some danger when humans alter the forest further in favor of urbanization, agriculture, silviculture, and cattle. The frog's range was historically subject to extensive deforestation through logging, but this has largely subsided.
