= Cycloramphus granulosus =

Conservation status
- Critically endangered, possibly extinct (IUCN 3.1)

Scientific classification
- Kingdom: Animalia
- Phylum: Chordata
- Class: Amphibia
- Order: Anura
- Family: Cycloramphidae
- Genus: Cycloramphus
- Species: C. granulosus

Binomial name
- Cycloramphus granulosus Lutz, 1929

Species of frog

Cycloramphus granulosus is a species of frog in the family Cycloramphidae. It is endemic to Brazil.

== Habitat ==
This terrestrial frog is found in Atlantic forest biomes. Adults and juveniles live near and in water, especially rocky streams. Adult frogs hide in cracks in rock at night. Scientists have found this frog between 800 and 1,600 m (2,600 and 5,200 ft) above sea level.

This frog has been reported in protected parks.

== Reproduction ==
The tadpoles live on rocks covered in a film of moving water.

== Threats ==
The IUCN classifies this species As criticially endangered and possibly extinct with no more than 50 adult frogs alive at any one time. Outside protected parks, the frogs suffer from habitat loss associated with urbanization, both cash-crop and subsistence agriculture, and cattle cultivation. Its range was once subject to large-scale deforestation, but this has largely subsisded. Scientists believe the fungus Batrachochytrium dendrobatidis may be responsible for the population decline through the disease chytridiomycosis, but this has yet to be confirmed.
