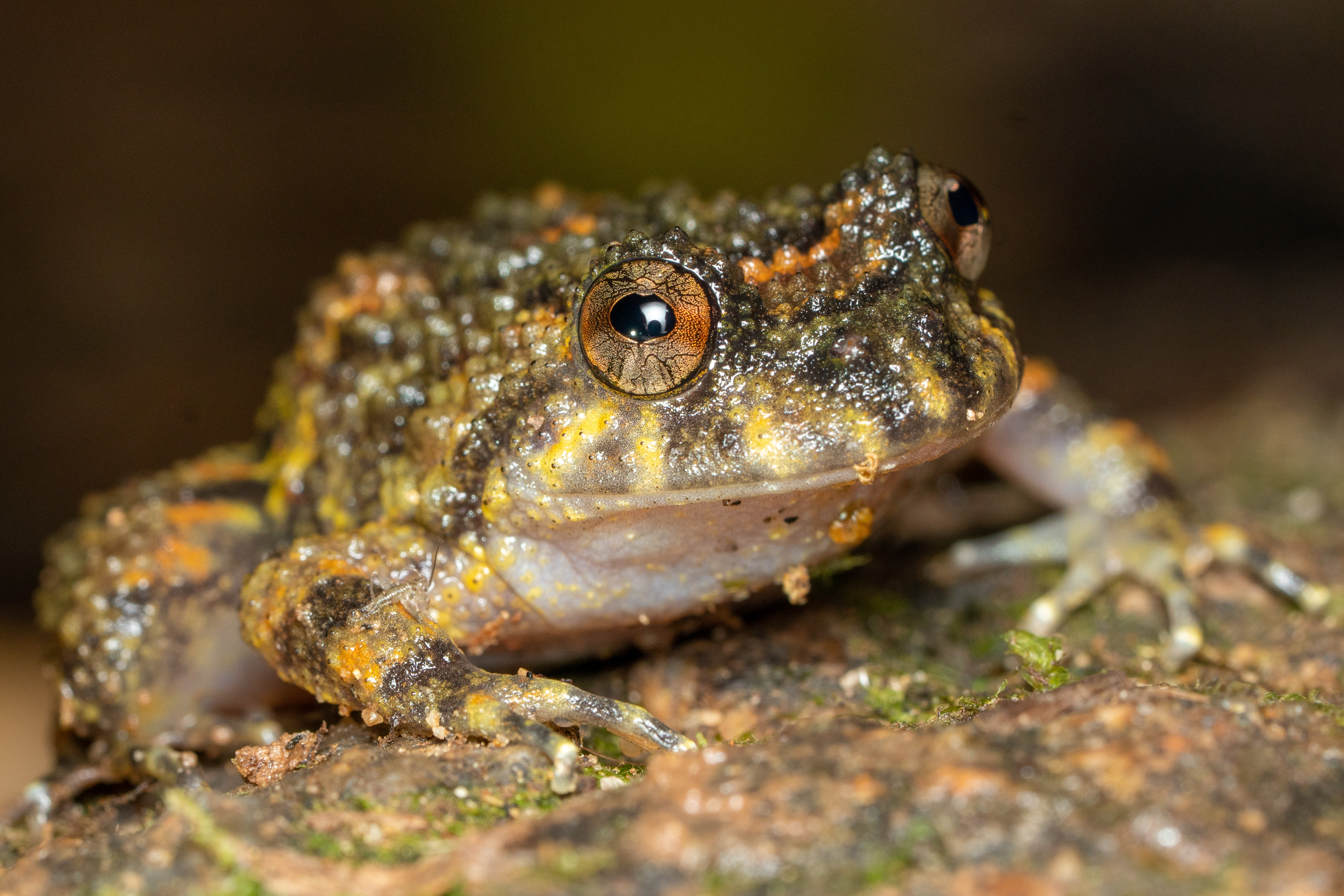
- Cycloramphus lutzorum at Carlos Botelho State Park

Conservation status
- Least Concern (IUCN 3.1)

Scientific classification
- Kingdom: Animalia
- Phylum: Chordata
- Class: Amphibia
- Order: Anura
- Family: Cycloramphidae
- Genus: Cycloramphus
- Species: C. lutzorum

Binomial name
- Cycloramphus lutzorum Heyer, 1983

= Cycloramphus lutzorum =

Species of frog

Lutz's button frog (Cycloramphus lutzorum) is a species of frog in the family Cycloramphidae. It is found in Brazil.

== Habitat ==
This terrestrial frog inhabits Atlantic Forest biomes. Both adults frogs and juveniles are found near water, especially rocky, fast-flowing streams. Scientists have seen this frog between 500 and 900 m (1,640 and 2,950 ft) above sea level.

Scientists have reported this frog in several protected areas.

== Reproduction ==
The tadpoles adhere to rocks in streams.

== Threats ==
The IUCN classifies this species as least concern of extinction. Although the area was historically subject to extensive deforestation, there is currently a large swath of Atlantic Forest in the frog's range. In some areas, the frogs may be in some danger from habitat loss in favor of urbanization, both cash-crop and subsistence farming, cattle cultivation, and silviculture.
