= Cycloramphus juimirim =

Conservation status
- Data Deficient (IUCN 3.1)

Scientific classification
- Kingdom: Animalia
- Phylum: Chordata
- Class: Amphibia
- Order: Anura
- Family: Cycloramphidae
- Genus: Cycloramphus
- Species: C. juimirim

Binomial name
- Cycloramphus juimirim Haddad & Sazima, 1989

Species of frog

Cycloramphus juimirim is a species of frog in the family Cycloramphidae. It is endemic to Brazil. Its natural habitats are subtropical or tropical moist lowland forest and rivers.
