= Cycloramphus diringshofeni =

Conservation status
- Critically endangered, possibly extinct (IUCN 3.1)

Scientific classification
- Kingdom: Animalia
- Phylum: Chordata
- Class: Amphibia
- Order: Anura
- Family: Cycloramphidae
- Genus: Cycloramphus
- Species: C. diringshofeni

Binomial name
- Cycloramphus diringshofeni Bokermann, 1957

Species of frog

Cycloramphus diringshofeni is a species of frog in the family Cycloramphidae. It is endemic to Brazil.

== Habitat ==
This terrestrial frog is found in Atlantic forest biomes. It has been found on the leaf litter.

Scientists found the frog near two protected places, but have yet to report it inside either: Serra da Itajaí National Park and Parque Estadual da Serra do Tabuleiro.

== Reproduction ==
Scientists have been uncertain about this frog's association with water. Recent research suggests that the tadpoles live in the moist leaf litter rather than in water or on water-covered rocks.

== Danger ==
The IUCN classifies this species as criticially endangered and possibly extinct with no more than 50 mature adults alive at any one time. The forests in São Bento do Sul are diminishing in size and quality due to urbanization, cattle rearing, and agriculture, including banana and pine tree farms. Scientists believe the decline in this species' population may have been caused by the dangerous fungus Batrachochytrium dendrobatidis. B. dendrobatidis causes chytridiomycosis, which has killed many frogs in South America.
