= Cycloramphus izecksohni =

Conservation status
- Endangered (IUCN 3.1)

Scientific classification
- Kingdom: Animalia
- Phylum: Chordata
- Class: Amphibia
- Order: Anura
- Family: Cycloramphidae
- Genus: Cycloramphus
- Species: C. izecksohni

Binomial name
- Cycloramphus izecksohni Heyer, 1983

Species of frog

Cycloramphus izecksohni is a species of frog in the family Cycloramphidae. It is endemic to southern Brazil and occurs in the Serra do Mar in the states of Santa Catarina, Paraná, and São Paulo. Prior to its description in 1983, it was confused with Cycloramphus duseni. Common name Izecksohn's button frog has been coined for this species.

== Etymology ==
The specific name izecksohni honours Eugênio Izecksohn, a Brazilian herpetologist.

== Description ==
Adult males measure 29–38 mm (1.1–1.5 in) and adult females 31–44 mm (1.2–1.7 in) in snout–vent length. The snout is rounded. The tympanum is hidden. The toes have moderate webbing. The dorsum is brown without distinctive colors. The texture is dorsal shagreen with small to large warts.

The male advertisement call consists of individual notes emitted sporadically. The call is short, lasting about 0.03 seconds. The maximum energy is at 2200–2400 Hz.

== Habitat and conservation ==
Cycloramphus izecksohniast-flowing streams in primary and old secondary forests at elevations up to 1,000 m (3,300 ft) above sea level. The tadpole develop in the splash zone of waterfalls, out of the water.

This species is locally common in Santa Catarina. Recent data from São Paulo are lacking and records from Paraná require confirmation. It is threatened by habitat loss caused by tourism, dam construction and human settlement. It occurs in some protected areas, but these lack adequate protection.
