= Cycloramphus dubius =

Conservation status
- Least Concern (IUCN 3.1)

Scientific classification
- Kingdom: Animalia
- Phylum: Chordata
- Class: Amphibia
- Order: Anura
- Family: Cycloramphidae
- Genus: Cycloramphus
- Species: C. dubius

Binomial name
- Cycloramphus dubius (Miranda-Ribeiro, 1920)

Synonyms
- Iliodiscus dubius Miranda-Ribeiro, 1920; Grypiscus dubius (Miranda-Ribeiro, 1920)

Species of frog

Cycloramphus dubius is a species of frog in the family Cycloramphidae. It is endemic to the state of São Paulo, Brazil. Common name São Paulo button frog has been coined for it.

== Description ==
Males can grow to 54 mm (2.1 in) and females to 60 mm (2.4 in) in snout–vent length; the mean adult size for males and females is 46–48 mm (1.8–1.9 in) and 52 mm (2.0 in), respectively. The body is dorso-ventrally flattened. The snout is rounded or has a flared lip. The toes are moderately webbed. Dorsal skin is granular-rugose and overlain with shagreen. Dorsal coloration is uniform or rarely blotched but without distinctive colors.

== Reproduction ==
Reproduction takes place near small waterfalls and continues throughout the year. Males call at night from rock crevices near the waterfalls. Average clutch size is 60 eggs (range 30–80 eggs). The eggs are deposited as a single layer outside water, but where they receive constant moisture from water droplets or spray. Males guard egg clutches and can defend them aggressively.

The eggs are 3 mm (0.1 in) in diameter. They hatch as Gosner stage 25 tadpoles measuring about 60 mm (2.4 in) in length. The tadpoles stay outside water, feeding above wet rocks.

== Habitat and conservation ==
Cycloramphus dubius occurs in primary and good quality secondary forest streams at elevations of 800–1,000 m (2,600–3,300 ft) above sea level. Adults are found on rocks and stones and the tadpoles on rocks covered with a film of running water, either in or next to streams.

Cycloramphus dubius is a reasonably common species. Major threats to it is air and water pollution from industry as well as disturbance of its habitat by touristic activities. Much of its range occurs within the well managed Parque Estadual da Serra do Mar. It is classified as of "least concern" by the International Union for Conservation of Nature (IUCN).
