= Cycloramphus migueli =

Conservation status
- Data Deficient (IUCN 3.1)

Scientific classification
- Kingdom: Animalia
- Phylum: Chordata
- Class: Amphibia
- Order: Anura
- Family: Cycloramphidae
- Genus: Cycloramphus
- Species: C. migueli

Binomial name
- Cycloramphus migueli Heyer, 1988

Species of frog

Cycloramphus migueli is a species of frog in the family Cycloramphidae. It is endemic to Brazil. Its natural habitat is subtropical or tropical moist lowland forest. It is threatened by habitat loss.
