= Lontras Shale Lagerstätte =

Geological formation in Brazil

- Stratigraphic range: Gzhelian; ~303–298 Ma
- Type: Fossil site
- Unit of: Campo Mourão Formation, Paraná Basin
- Thickness: 1.15 m (3.8 ft)

Lithology
- Primary: Black Shale

Location
- Coordinates: 26°9′30″S 49°48′52″W
- Region: Mafra, Santa Catarina
- Country: Brazil
- Lontras Shale Lagerstätte (Brazil)

The Lontras Shale Lagerstätte is a Konservat-Lagerstätte in the Late Carboniferous Campo Mourão Formation of the Paraná Basin, Southern Brazil. The deposition of this site occurred in a fjord estuary with an anoxic seafloor, during a deglaciation sequence of the Late Paleozoic Ice Age and the subsequent flooding to the surrounding paleovalleys. The shale is also known for its exceptional preservation of soft- and hard-bodied organisms such as insects, fishes, ammonoids, brachiopods, sponges and driftwood. Anoxia (which could sometimes reach the upper levels of the water column), lack of scavengers, rapid burial and the low water temperatures seem to be the main causes for such fossilisation.

The vast majority of the fossil content of this lagerstätte originates from the Campáleo outcrop, which is dated to the Permian-Carboniferous boundary.

== History ==
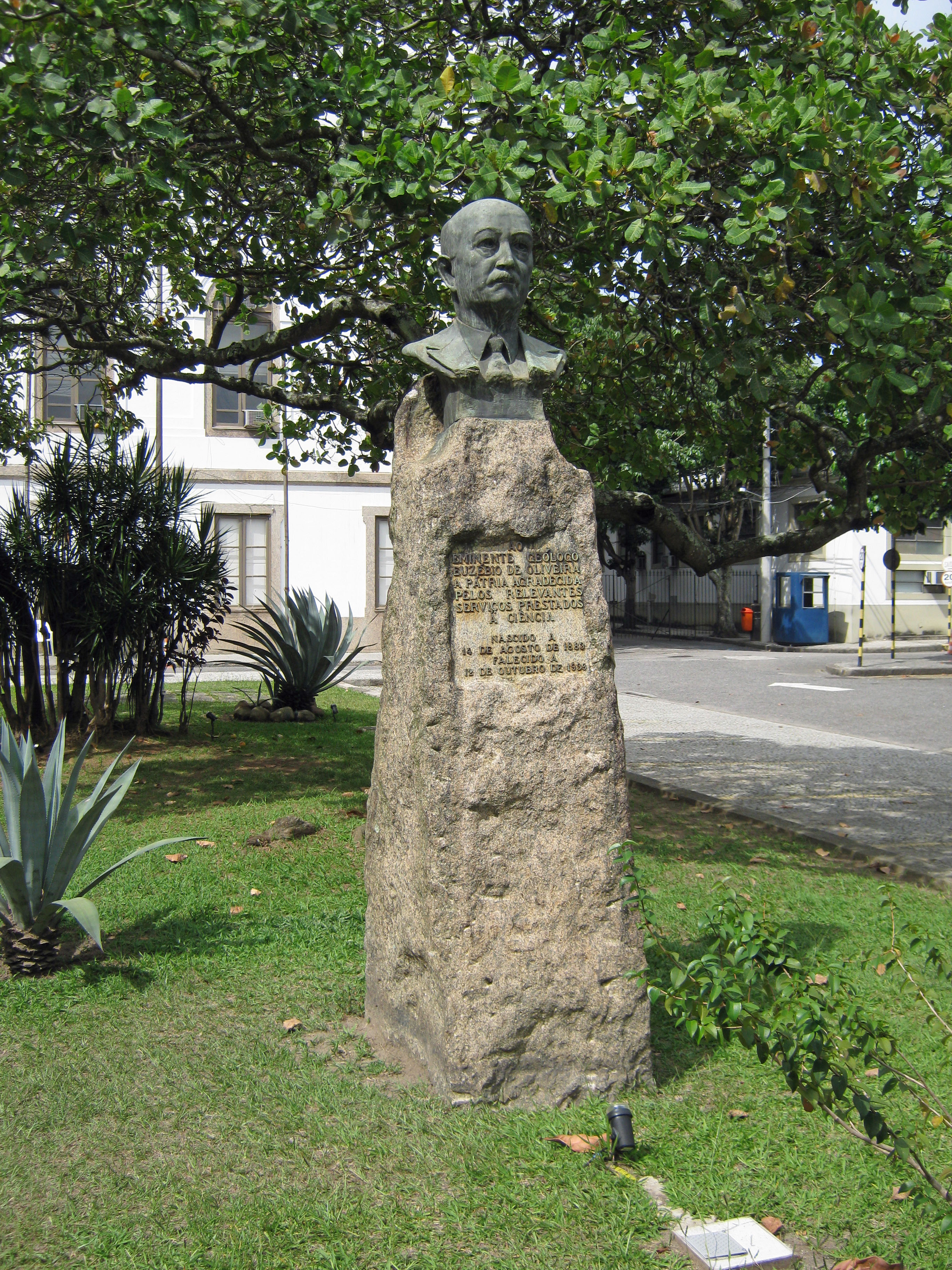
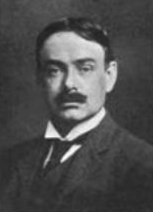
Oliveira and Woodworth.

The Lontras Shale was discovered by Jay Backus Woodworth and Euzébio Paulo de Oliveira in a 1908 expedition researching glacial beds in Southern Brazil, funded by the Shaler Memorial Fund.

While researching beds of glacial till between the municipalities of Rio Negro and São Bento do Sul, they discovered layers of marine fossiliferous black shale 6 km south of Rio Negro, where the municipality of Mafra would be later formed. In a 1912 letter to Woodworth, which would later be published, Oliveira describes finding brachiopods, fish scales, poriferans, as well as insect wing and bivalve molluscs in Teixeira Soares.

The fossils were taken to the Serviço Geológico e Mineralógico in Rio de Janeiro, where Orville A. Derby, director of agency, send part of the collection to John M. Clarke for study. Clarke, in turn, handed them to Rudolf Ruedemann who gave a quick analysis before handing them back. It would not be until 1929 that the fossils had a deeper examination, after Ruedemann encountered similar fossils in the Ouachita Mountains of Arkansas and Oklahoma. He identified the brachiopods Lingula and Obirculoidea, molds of hexactinellid sponges, fish scales (identified by William L. Bryant as paleoniscids) and fish coprolites. These coprolites where later re-examined and identified as caddisfly larval cases.

For the next few decades, research on the Lontras Shale site would be sparse. Oliveira (1930) described three new species of brachiopod, while Carvalho et al. (1942) collected new material. In the 1980s, Oscar Rösler started collection and research on the site. Meanwhile, two species of fish found in the site were described.

In 1997, the fossil site made controversial headlines when the multinacional company BANDAG (now owned by Bridgestone) attempted to construct a factory on the site of the Lontras Shale. While looking for business in the MERCOSUL, the company sought the municipality of Mafra for various strategic purposes. However, while during construction the engineers excavated fossiliferous rock and attempted to remove the obstacle with explosives. Despite the destruction of much of the outcrop, 60 tonnes of fossiliferous shale were left to the elements for months. News quickly spread across the scientific community about the vandalisation of the natural heritage site, and after a complaint, the responsible government agencies embargoed the construction. After a period of discussion, which involved several public agencies, universities, and scientific societies, as well as the local population, it was decided that the University of Contestado would take responsibility for displaced rock.

It was further agreed that the recently retired Professor Oscar Rösler would be made in charge of studying them at the CENPALEO Project (Paleontological Centre of the University of Contestado). Afterwards, the municipality of Mafra elected to make the surrounding lands of public utility and later donating it to the Frei Miguel Foundation, which was created to help maintain the CENPALEO. Thus, ever since the creation Paleontological Centre, the number of scientific works centred around the site has grown exponentially.

== Description ==
=== Geology ===
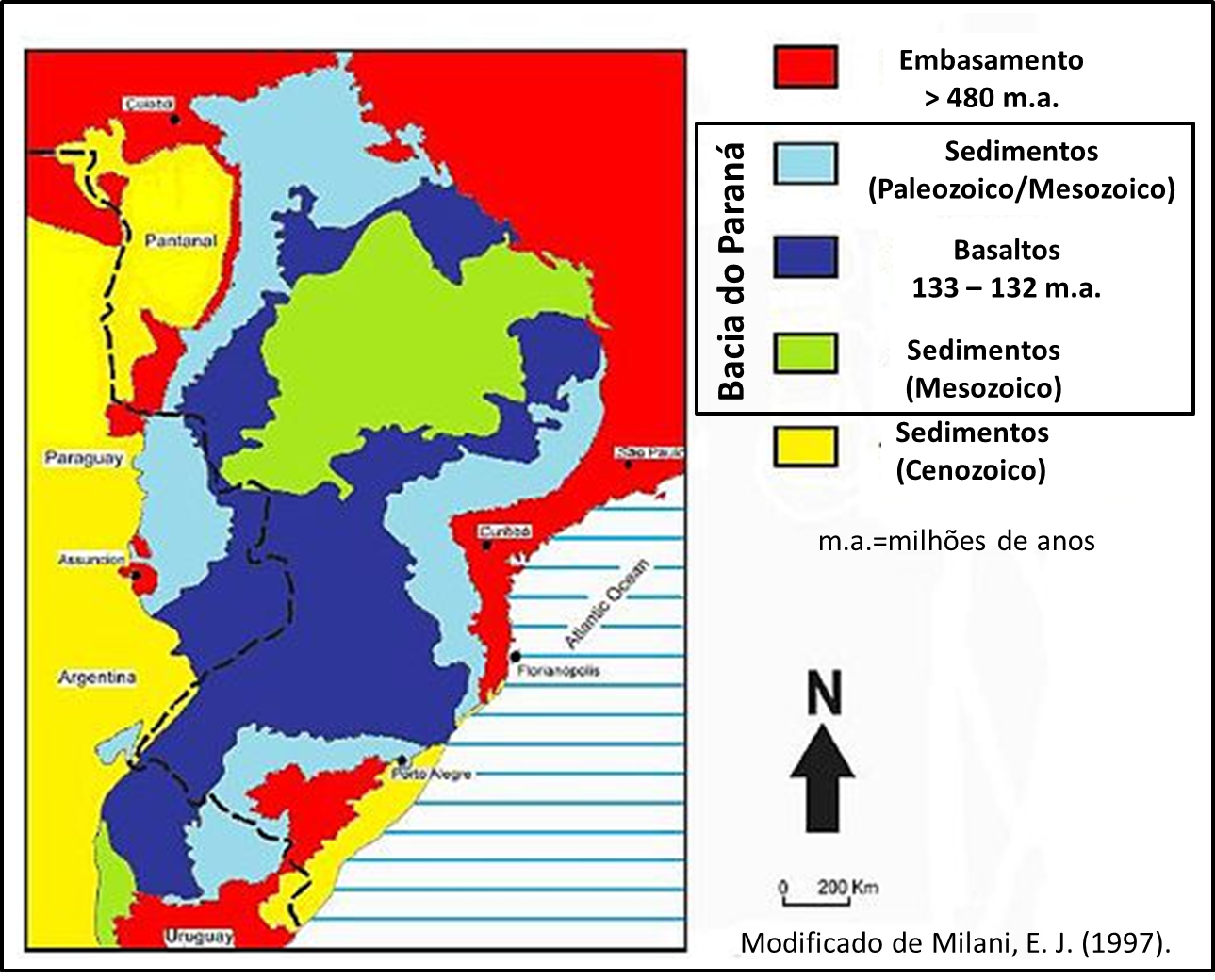
Map of the Paraná Basin. The Lontras Shale is located in paleozoic deposits (cyan).

The Lontras Shale is part of the Campo Mourão Formation, located on the Paraná Basin of Southern Brazil. Deposited during the Late Paleozoic Ice Age, the Campo Mourão Formation represents at least three deglaciation cycles. It is divided into two members: the lower Lapas Member, composed of sandstones, interpreted to have originated in tunnel valleys carved and deposited by the advance of glaciers; and the upper Lontras Member, which harbours the Lontras Shale Lagerstätte.

It varies between 50 metres thick at the surface to 101 metres thick at the subsurface, and consists of an interbedding of organic-rich black shale, mudstone and siltstone, with varve-like bedding and striated dropstones (stones carried by icebergs) evidencing that this member was deposited during a deglaciation and consequent rise of sea level. The Lontras Shale itself represents the maximum flood surface, a point in time at which the sea level was at its highest. Of the total 101 metre-thick member, only 1.15 metres are the Lontras Shale Lagerstätte, defined by both the high quality and diversity of its fossiliferous material. The shale itself is also subdivided, with each subdivision being based on its pyrite composition.

The majority of its fossils originate from the Campáleo outcrop, in the municipality of Mafra, Santa Catarina, while most other localities only yield trace fossils and palynomorphs. However, at least two other fossiliferous outcrops have been suggested for the Campo Mourão Formation; the Guaraúna shale, located 105 km from the Lontras Shale at the city of Teixeira Soares, which provides fossils of brachiopods, and a shale deposit less than a metre thick located 85 km from the Lontras Shale in Rio dos Cedros. The latter site has a fossil assemblage similar to the Campáleo outcrop, with larval cases, coprolites, brachiopods, sponges, and fishes. Because of a lack of studies on this locality, it is not clear whether it is part of the Lontras Shale Lagerstätte or a separate bed.

The age of the Campo Mourão Formation has been debated in literature. Although initially dated to the Early Permian, during the Sakmarian-Artinskian interval (294-275 Ma), recent biostratigraphic and chronostratigraphic analysis place the formation at the Middle Pennsylvanian, during the Bashkirian-Moscovian interval (315-307 Ma), while the CAMPÁLEO section is dated to the boundary between the Carboniferous and Permian periods.

==== Preservation ====
The fossils of the Lontras Shale have been preserved in a multitude of forms, such as carbonisation, phosphatisation, silicification, pyritisation, concretions and tridimensional preservation. Some examples of these are; the preserved leg muscles of blattodea insects, completely articulated sponges, tridimensionally preserved fishes and silky larval cases of trichopteran insects.

Organisms with a siliceous skeleton, such as glass sponges, are mostly preserved by recrystalisation with their original mineralogy intact, occasionally being permineralised by phosphate. Ammonoids, malacostracans and ostracods, animals with carbonate carapaces or shells, are often fossilised as carbonaceous film or by pyritisation, without any of their original calcium carbonate. Insects, brachiopods, fish remains, conodonts and scolecodonts tend to preserve their original composition, because animal remains with chitin and phosphate in their bodies are more likely to preserve when compared to carbonate remains. However, some of these organisms can also undergo carbonisation, phosphatisation, and less often pyritisation, as seen with some fish and insect soft tissue. Plant remains normally preserve as carbonaceous compressions.

Other forms of preservation include possible polychaete annelids being preserved in concretions, with chaeta (brittles) and body outline visible alongside its jaws, fish coprolites preserved by phosphatisation or kerogenisation, and insect larval cases preserved by kerogenisation with partial pyritisation. Both processes of phosphatisation and pyritisation have been linked to sulfate-reducing bacterias, with possible microbial mats being associated to specific levels of the Lontras Shale, supporting a preservation similar to other lagerstätten such as the Soom Shale of South Africa.

Despite the Lontras Member being horizontally extensive and relatively thick, the Lontras Shale Lagerstätte and an other fossiliferous outcrops are situated in a very narrow horizon. The question of why only these layers of the member exhibit fossiliferous strata has been explained in the literature by some factors, such as; the restricted fjord-estuary environment in which the shale was deposited being a hotspot for organic diversity, whereas the other environments within the Lontra Member did not exhibit such favourable conditions for colonisation; the period in which the shale was deposited being of a maximum flood (highest sea level), with optimal climate conditions and input of continental flows carrying nutrients; the presence of anoxic bottoms and anoxic events, which would periodically kill the community and prevent microorganisms from decomposing them until burial. Once these conditions changed with the drop of sea level, it coincided with a decreasing flow of nutrients and the environment becoming increasingly inhospitable. This culminated in the following 40 metres of the Lontras Member being afossiliferous.

Another factor for the lack of fossil finds in the region can also be attributed to collection bias, which extends beyond this locality, such as geological surveys in Brazil normally not having a paleontological focus and the subtropical climate quickly weathering most outcrops before their fossils can be salvaged.

Although much of the evidence explaining this organic abundance relies on the fact that the shale was deposited on a fjord-like environment, another paleovalley has been proposed in the Alfredo Wagner municipality in which no fossils have been discovered. However, this is likely because the Lontras Shale was deposited at the base of the Lontras Member during a period of deglaciation, and specifically at a time when all the previously mentioned factors favoured the colonisation of the fjord, while the Alfredo Wagner paleovalley was deposited much later during a period of glacial advance, when conditions where not as ideal.

=== Paleoenvironment ===
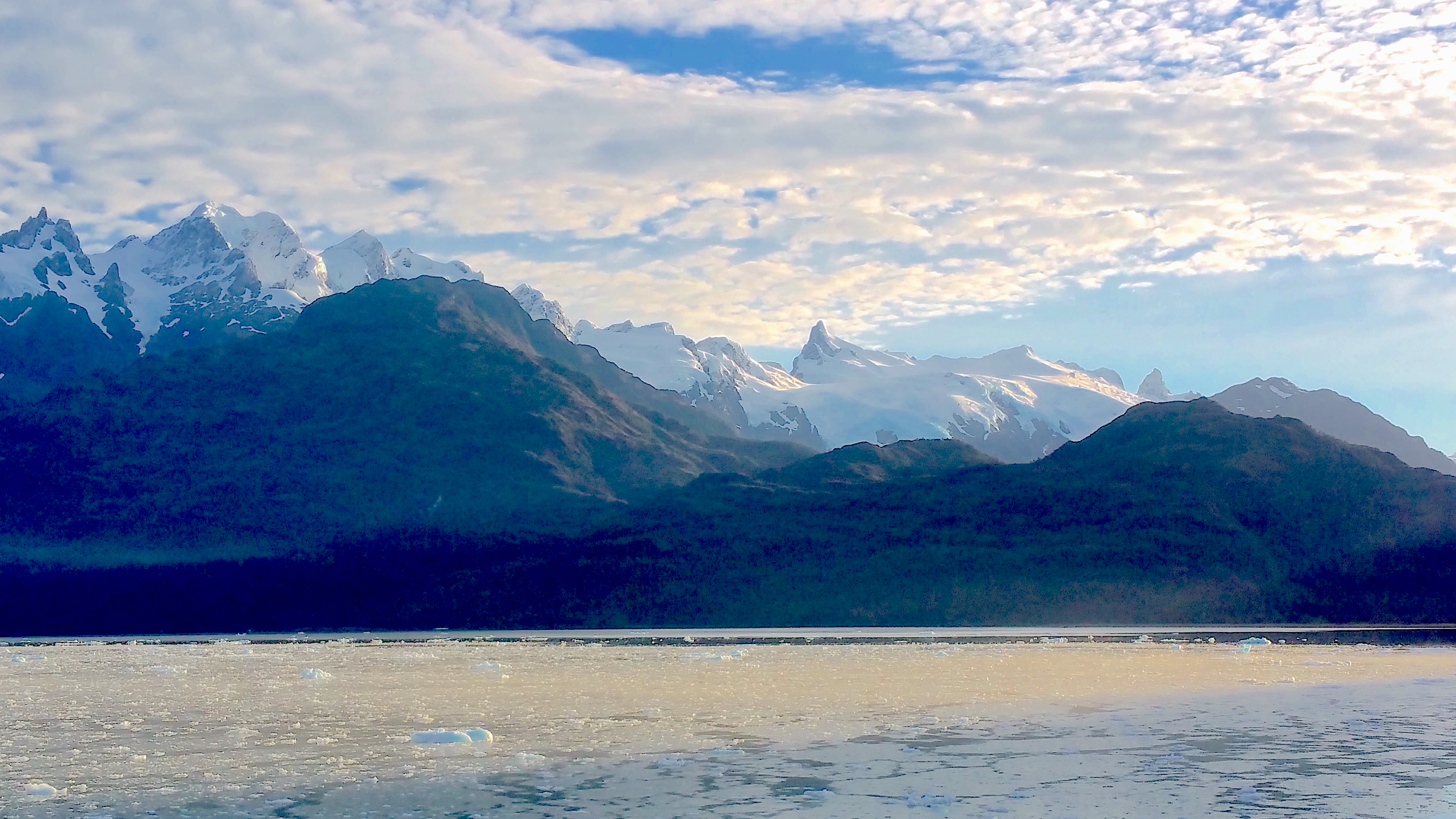
Serrano Fjord, Chile. The Mafra Paleofjord was a temperate fjord, much like this one.

The most accepted interpretation as to the depositional environment of this lagerstätte was that of a distal fjord estuary, formally known as the Mafras Paleofjord, though some authors have suggest a shallow marine environment instead. Based on the reorientation of the intact fossil material by water currents, a north/northeastern direction has been proposed for the mouth of the Mafras Paleofjord in relation to the fossil site.

Continental flows of melted water carrying nutrients would have resulted in high ecological productivity. The marine substrate was anoxic or euxinic (an environment with no oxygen and high amounts of hydrogen sulfide) and periodical events occurred where the bottom anoxia would ascend to the upper levels of the water column. Based on this, the water column was estimated to be no deeper than ~200-400 metres. The Mafra Paleofjord would thus be comparable to modern temperate fjords, such as the Framvaren Fjord in Norway or the Chilean fjords, with the rich mixing of both marine and terrestrial biotas and the high stratification of the water column.

==== Paleoecology ====
When the sea level was at its highest during the deglaciation, the temperate Mafra Fjord was a diversity hotspot, harbouring a lively community of both aquatic and terrestrial biotas, flourishing because of the high availability of food, optimal climate, moderate marine circulation and low sedimentation rate. At deeper waters, which had at least a low level of oxygenation, the environment was dominated by colonies of glass sponges and insect larvae. Given the proximity to the continent, this meant that insect eggs could be easily deposited on the coast and carried to deeper waters by currents, with similar behavior being noted from trichopteran insects from fjords in New Zealand.

The anoxic conditions of the sea floor prevented its colonisation by organisms living inside or on top of sediment (infaunal and epifaunal organisms). Nevertheless, sporadic oxygenation events at the bottom may have helped the proliferation of sponges and larvae. The diversity of bottom-dwelling organisms was overall low. Above the sea floor, swimming organisms like fishes, conodonts, ammonites, and probably polychaete worms and ostracods inhabited the water column, although organisms such as ammonites and conodonts preferred shallower waters.

In the shallower, more oxygenated waters, the marine substrate was inhabited by brachiopods such as lingulids and orbiculoids, whose shells could be parasitised by gastropods and, after death, be made available for colonisation by polychaete worms. In the upmost section of the water column, continental currents would carry remains of leaves, stems and insects into deeper waters. A pattern of increasing and decreasing diversity has been observed in the strata of the shale, probably related to environmental changes (such as storms, ice melting or tides), which, in cycles of seasons, decades or millennia, would alter the rates of sedimentation, turbidity and remobilisation, thus influencing the biota. Sporadic periods of anoxia would, on occasion, kill the entire assemblage.

== Fossil Content ==
Color key: Taxon / Reclassified taxon / Taxon falsely reported as present / Dubious taxon or junior synonym / Ichnotaxon / Ootaxon / Morphotaxon	Notes; Uncertain or tentative taxa are in small text; ~~crossed out~~ taxa are discredited.

=== Flora ===
Well preserved wood remains have been found scarttered through the Lontras shale, mainly Agathoxylon and Abietopitys, and small fragments occur commonly. Amber-like structures were also found.

Genus	Species	Presence	Description	Images
Abietopitys	A. sp.	Campáleo outcrop.	A Gymnosperm.	
Agathoxylon	A. sp.	Campáleo outcrop.	An Araucariaceae tree.	

=== Poriferans ===
Hexactinellid sponges make up the majority of the poriferan fossil remains, having been found almost a hundred complete and articulated remains, as well as soft tissue remains. A possible demospongid was also reported from the Lontras Shale. The fossils found in the Lontras Shale are the best preserved poriferan fossils of Brazil.

Genus	Species	Presence	Description
Demospongiae indet.		Campáleo outcrop.	A single unidentified common sponge fossil.
Microhemidiscia	M. greinerti	Campáleo outcrop.	A hexactinellid sponge, also known as a glass sponges.
Reticulosa indet.		Campáleo outcrop	Extinct order of sponges.

=== Insects ===
More than one hundred fossils uncovered from the Lontras Shale have been assigned to either the orders Blattodea or Grylloblattodea, given that approximately 54% of these fossils represent the phyloblattid Anthracoblattina mendesi preserved in exquisit detail. Likewise, hundreds of delicate larval cases of trichopterans have also been found, extenting their fossil record to the Late Carboniferous, as well as the remains of other insects orders.

Genus	Species	Presence	Description	Images
Anthracoblattina	A. mendesi	Campáleo outcrop.	A phyloblattid cockroach.	
Coleoptera indet.		Campáleo outcrop	Order of insects commonly called bettles.	
Diaphanopterodea indet.		Campáleo outcrop	Extinct order of flying insects.	
Ephemeroptera indet.		Campáleo outcrop	Order of insects commonly called mayflies.	
Grylloblattida indet.		Campáleo outcrop	Group of wingless insects.	
Hemiptera indet.		Campáleo outcrop	Order of insects commonly called true bugs.	
Mecoptera indet.		Campáleo outcrop	Order of insects commonly called scorpionflies.	
Orthoptera indet.		Campáleo outcrop	Order of insects comprising grasshopper, crickets and their relatives.	
Trichoptera indet.		Campáleo outcrop.	A silky larval case. This is the oldest ever found for the group.	

=== Annelids ===
More than 20 articulated scolecodonts (jaws of polychaete worms) have been discovered inside concretions, as well as possible preservation of the body outline with chaeta (bristles) visible.

Taxon	Presence	Description
Annelida indet.	Campáleo outcrop	Scolecodonts and possible soft tissue remains.
Paulinitidae indet.	Campáleo outcrop.	A family of polychaete annelids. Specimens found in the shale have affinities to the genus Paulinites.
Polychaetaspidae indet.	Campáleo outcrop	A family of polychaete annelids.

=== Crustaceans ===
Malacostracan crustaceans are very fragmentary, with rare complete remains. Ostracods have also been found in small clusters.

Taxon	Presence	Description
Eumalacostraca indet.	Campáleo outcrop	Sublass of crustaceans. Mostly fragmentary.
Ostracoda indet.	Campáleo outcrop	Class of crustaceans. Size of 175 μm in length.

=== Molluscs ===
At least one ammonoid and one gastropod have been found in the shale.

Taxon	Presence	Description	Images
Ammonoidea indet.	Campáleo outcrop.	At least two compressed unidentified ammonoid shells. Analysis show affinity to the genus Uraloceras.	Uraloceras.
Gastropoda indet.	Campáleo outcrop		

=== Brachiopods ===
Brachiopods were one of the first fossils discovered from the Lontras Shale, being noted for their diminutive size. At least 40 or so specimens were found, isolated and parallel to the bedding. Specimens found in the shale are usually small.

Genus	Species	Presence	Description	Images
Beecheria	B. sp.	Campáleo outcrop	A beecheriid brachiopod.	
Biconvexiella	B. sp.	Campáleo outcrop	An amboceoliid brachiopod.	
Chonetes	C. rionegrensis	Campáleo outcrop	A chonetid brachiopod.	
Discinidae indet.		Campáleo outcrop	A family of brachiopods.	
Langella	L. imbituvensis	Campáleo outcrop	A lingulid brachiopod.	
Orbiculoidea	O. guaraunensis	Campáleo outcrop	A discinid brachiopod.	
Quinquenella	Q. sp.	Campáleo outcrop	A rugosochonetid brachiopod.	

=== Conodonts ===
Several dozen conodont specimens have been found articulated, with hundreds more pertaining to isolated specimens.

Genus	Species	Presence	Description
Gondolella	G. sp.	Campáleo outcrop	A gondolellid conodont.
Mesogondolella	M. spp.	Campáleo outcrop	A gondolellid conodont.

=== Fishes ===
Possibly up to two hundred actinopterygian fish specimens have been discovered, either tridimensionally preserved in concretions or flattened on shale slabs. Chondrichthyes, however, are only represented by teeth, and too date no complete body fossils have been found.

Genus	Species	Presence	Description	Images
Coelacanthus	C. sp.	Campáleo outcrop	A lobe-finned fish. Known from scales.	
Crioselache	C. wittigi	Campáleo outcrop	A symmoriiform shark.	
Daphnaechelus	D. sp.	Campáleo outcrop	A ray-finned fish.	
Irajapintoseidon	I. uruguayensis	Campáleo outcrop	A ray-finned fish.	
Roslerichthyies	R. riomafrensis	Campáleo outcrop	A ray-finned fish.	
Santosichtyes	S. mafrensis	Campáleo outcrop	A ray-finned fish.	

=== Ichnofossils ===
Coprolite and enterospira (intestinal material) remains have long been reported from the shale. One of the first puported instances of coprolites, as identified by Ruedemann (1929), was later identified as an insect larval case. Perforations in brachiopod shells have also been noted, indicating possible predation, as well as burrows that indicated colonisation by polychaete worms.

Ichnogenus	Ichnopecies	Presence	Description	Images
Amber		Campáleo outcrop.	Fossilised tree resin.	
Arachnostega	A. isp.	Campáleo outcrop.	Burrowing traces inside of shells, indicative of polychaete colonisation. Diametre of the burrows range between 0.08 and 0.09 mm.	
Coprolite remains		Campáleo outcrop, Rio dos Cedros outcrop.	Fossilised faeces. The coprolites found are rounded and cylindrical, mostly having ~24 mm of length and ~13 mm in width.	
Enterospire		Campáleo outcrop.	Fossilised gut contents of sharks. They are cylindrical, with ~22 mm in length, ~11 mm of width and ~5 mm in diameter.	
Oichnus	O. paraboloides O. simplex	Campáleo outcrop	Boring holes, likely evidence of predation.	
