= Jaceruba Environmental Protection Area =

- Área de Proteção Ambiental Jaceruba
- IUCN category V (protected landscape/seascape)
- Location within Brazil
- Nearest city: Nova Iguaçu, Rio de Janeiro
- Coordinates: 22.627016°S 43.555324°W
- Area: 2,353 hectares (5,810 acres)
- Designation: Environmental protection area
- Created: 6 June 2002
- Administrator: Secretaria Municipal de Urbanismo e Meio Ambiente - SEMUAM

The Jaceruba Environmental Protection Area (Portuguese: Área de Proteção Ambiental Jaceruba, formerly the Rio São Pedro de Jaceruba Environmental Protection Area) is a municipal environmental protection area in the state of Rio de Janeiro, Brazil.

== Location ==
The Jaceruba Environmental Protection Area (APA Jaceruba) is in the northwest of the municipality of Nova Iguaçu, Rio de Janeiro, on the border with the municipalities of Miguel Pereira and Japeri. It is in an inaccessible region adjoining the Tinguá Biological Reserve to the east. It is accessed by RJ-119, a dirt road in poor condition. It has an area of about 2,353 hectares (5,810 acres). The APA contains remnants of Atlantic Forest. Threats include deforestation, burning and irregular occupation.

== History ==
Before the APA was created the area was used for hunting, capture of wild animals for sale and extraction of hearts of palm. Restaurants by the roadside freely advertised the sale of bush meat. The area was also under pressure from real estate speculators due to the expansion of the metropolitan arc of Rio de Janeiro.

The Rio São Pedro de Jaceruba Environmental Protection Area was created by municipal decree 6.492 of 6 June 2002. On 5 November 2002 by municipal decree 6.547 it was renamed the APA Jaceruba (Jaceruba Environmental Protection Area). Law 3.592 of 7 July 2004 confirmed creation of the APA with an area of about 2,353 hectares (5,810 acres) with the purpose of protecting natural resources considered essential to the local residents, encouraging environmental education and preserving the natural landscape with emphasis on protection and preservation of the forests, springs and headwaters of the São Pedro River basin.

The APA is part of the Central Rio de Janeiro Atlantic Forest Mosaic, created in 2006. On 20 January 2010 Maria Emilia Nascimento wrote to Carlos Minc, federal Minister of the Environment, asking for help in ensuring the safety of representatives of the APA on the council of the mosaic. They had been suffering from threats and attacks in the isolated APA.

== Sources ==
- APA Jaceruba (in Portuguese), Biblioteca Virtual do Meio Ambiente da Baixada Fluminense
- Costa, Cláudia; Lamas, Ivana; Fernandes, Rosan (December 2010), Planejamento Estratégico do Mosaico Central Fluminense (PDF) (in Portuguese), Reserva da Biosfera da Mata Atlântica, archived from the original (PDF) on 2016-10-07
- Lindberg Farias (22 December 2008), Nova Iguaçu – da cidade que temos, à cidade que queremos (PDF) (in Portuguese), Prefeitura da Cidade de Nova Iguaçu, archived from the original (PDF) on 2016-10-12
- Nascimento, Maria Emilia (20 January 2010), "Crimes ambientais em Nova Iguaçu equipara-se ao que acontece no Norte do Brasil", Agenda 21 Guapimirim (in Portuguese)
- Pereira Marques, Mario Filho (5 November 2002), Decreto nº 6.547 de 05 de Novembro de 2002 (in Portuguese), Municipality of Nova Iguaçu
