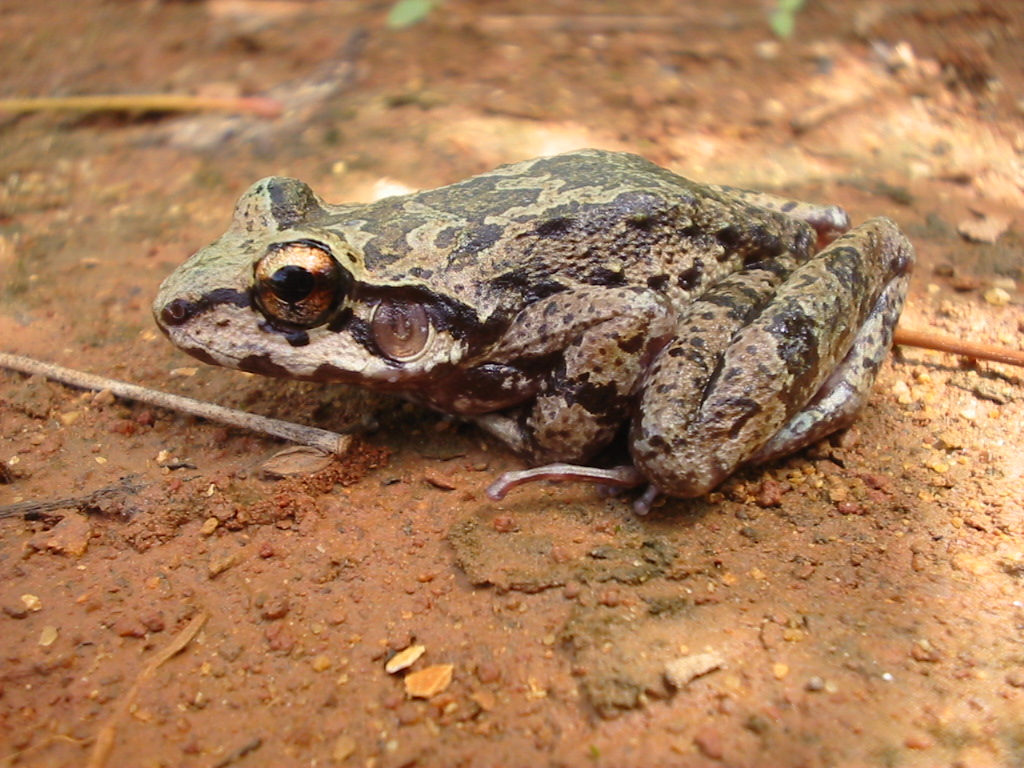

Conservation status
- Least Concern (IUCN 3.1)

Scientific classification
- Kingdom: Animalia
- Phylum: Chordata
- Class: Amphibia
- Order: Anura
- Family: Cycloramphidae
- Genus: Thoropa
- Species: T. miliaris

Binomial name
- Thoropa miliaris (Spix, 1824)

= Thoropa miliaris =

Species of frog

Thoropa miliaris is a species of frog in the family Cycloramphidae. It is endemic to Brazil. Its natural habitats are subtropical or tropical moist lowland forest, subtropical or tropical moist montane forest, rivers, rocky areas, and rocky shores. It is threatened by habitat loss.
