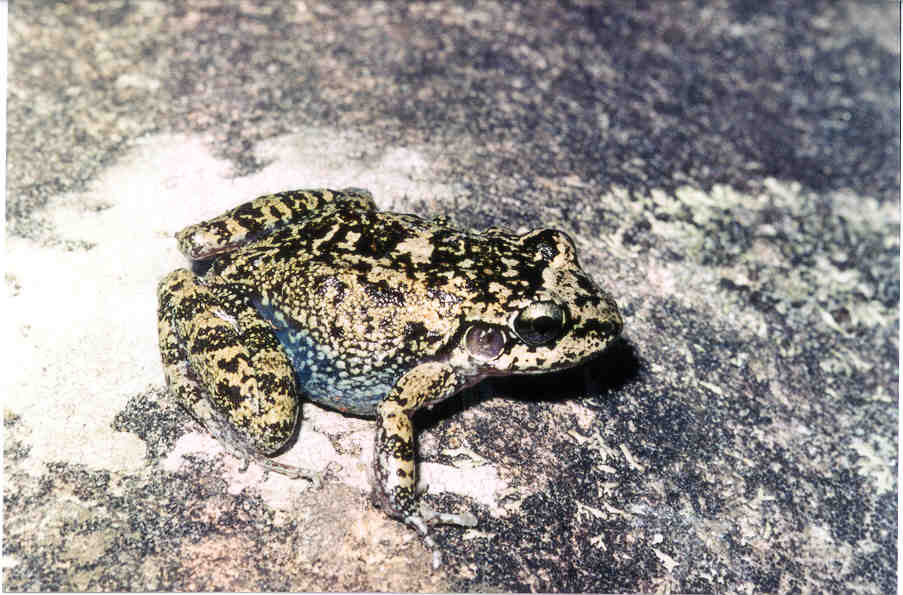

Conservation status
- Least Concern (IUCN 3.1)

Scientific classification
- Kingdom: Animalia
- Phylum: Chordata
- Class: Amphibia
- Order: Anura
- Family: Cycloramphidae
- Genus: Thoropa
- Species: T. megatympanum

Binomial name
- Thoropa megatympanum (Caramaschi & Sazima, 1984)

= Thoropa megatympanum =

Species of frog

Thoropa megatympanum is a species of frog in the family Cycloramphidae. It is endemic to Brazil. Its natural habitats are subtropical or tropical seasonally wet or flooded lowland grassland, rivers, and rocky areas. It is threatened by habitat loss.
