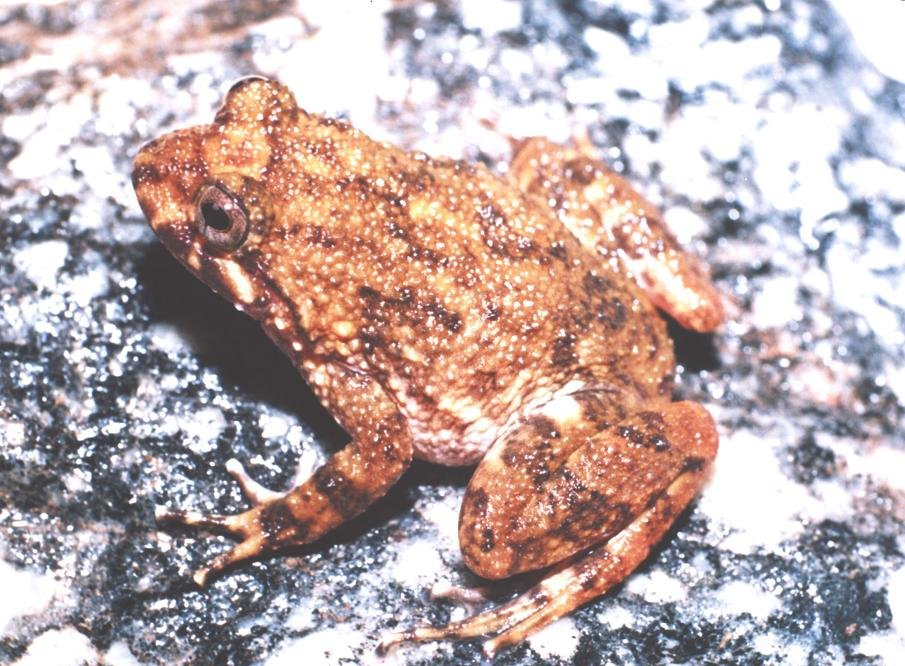
- Cycloramphus boraceiensis

Scientific classification
- Kingdom: Animalia
- Phylum: Chordata
- Class: Amphibia
- Order: Anura
- Family: Cycloramphidae
- Genus: Cycloramphus; Tschudi, 1838

Type species
- Cycloramphos fulginosus Tschudi, 1838

Diversity
- 28 species (see text)

Synonyms
- Cycloramphos Tschudi, 1838 (alternative spelling); Cyclorhamphus Agassiz, 1845 (unjustified emendation); Pithecopsis Günther, 1859; Zachaenus Cope, 1866; Grypiscus Cope, 1867; Oocormus Boulenger, 1905; Iliodiscus Miranda-Ribeiro, 1920; Craspedoglossa Müller, 1922; Niedenia Ahl, 1924

= Cycloramphus =

Genus of amphibians

Cycloramphus is a genus of frogs in the family Cycloramphidae. The genus is endemic to the southeastern Brazil. They are sometimes known as the button frogs.

== Species ==
There are 28 species:

- Cycloramphus acangatan Verdade and Rodrigues, 2003
- Cycloramphus asper Werner, 1899
- Cycloramphus bandeirensis Heyer, 1983
- Cycloramphus bolitoglossus (Werner, 1897)
- Cycloramphus boraceiensis Heyer, 1983
- Cycloramphus brasiliensis (Steindachner, 1864)
- Cycloramphus carvalhoi Heyer, 1983
- Cycloramphus catarinensis Heyer, 1983
- Cycloramphus cedrensis Heyer, 1983
- Cycloramphus diringshofeni Bokermann, 1957
- Cycloramphus dubius (Miranda-Ribeiro, 1920)
- Cycloramphus duseni (Andersson, 1914)
- Cycloramphus eleutherodactylus (Miranda-Ribeiro, 1920)
- Cycloramphus faustoi Brasileiro, Haddad, Sawaya, and Sazima, 2007
- Cycloramphus fuliginosus Tschudi, 1838
- Cycloramphus granulosus Lutz, 1929
- Cycloramphus izecksohni Heyer, 1983
- Cycloramphus juimirim Haddad and Sazima, 1989
- Cycloramphus lithomimeticus Silva and Ouvernay, 2012
- Cycloramphus lutzorum Heyer, 1983
- Cycloramphus migueli Heyer, 1988
- Cycloramphus mirandaribeiroi Heyer, 1983
- Cycloramphus ohausi (Wandolleck, 1907)
- Cycloramphus organensis Weber, Verdade, Salles, Fouquet, and Carvalho-e-Silva, 2011
- Cycloramphus rhyakonastes Heyer, 1983
- Cycloramphus semipalmatus (Miranda-Ribeiro, 1920)
- Cycloramphus stejnegeri (Noble, 1924)
- Cycloramphus valae Heyer, 1983
