= Nova Iguaçu =

- Municipality
- Município de Nova Iguaçu; Municipality of Nova Iguaçu
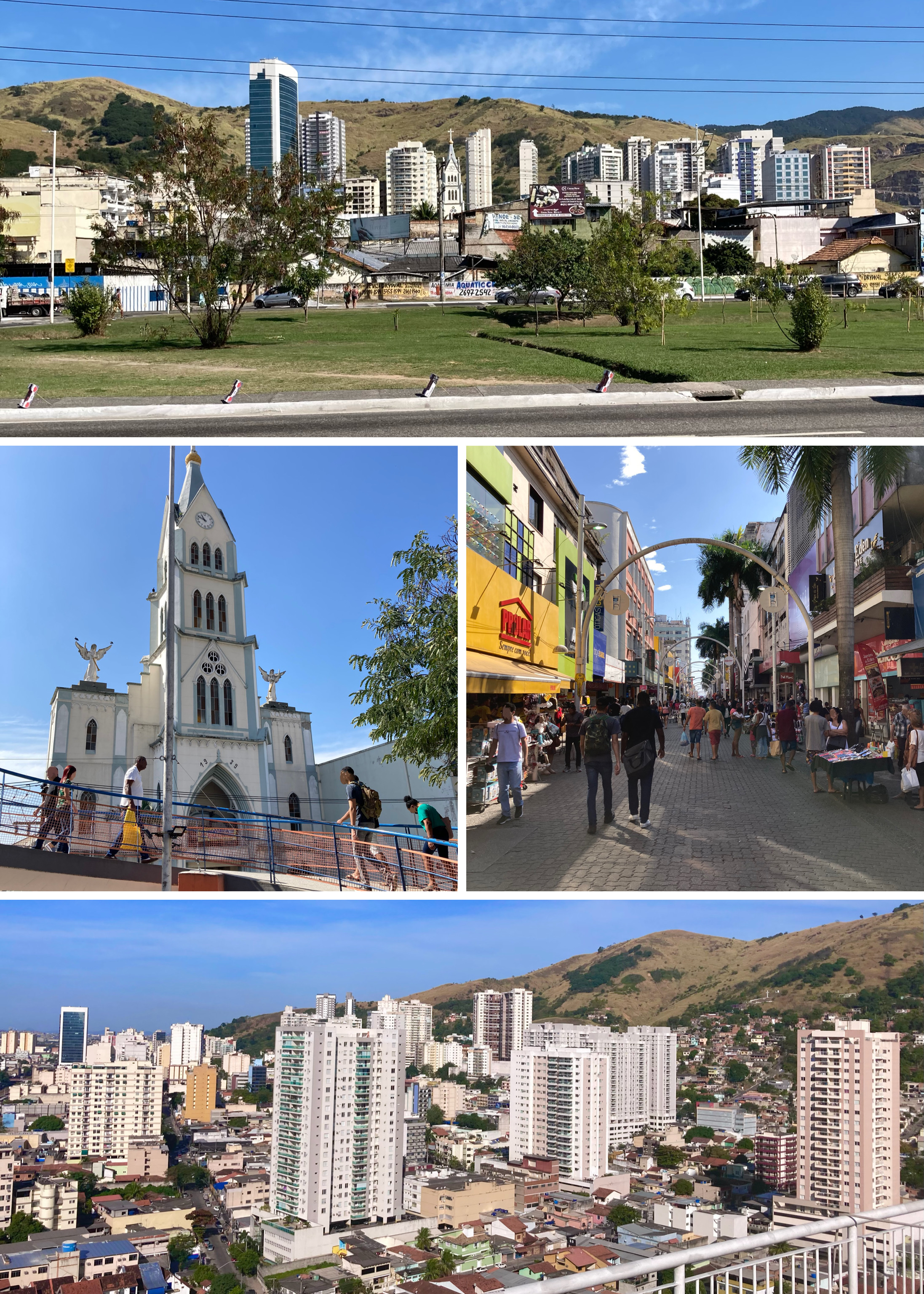

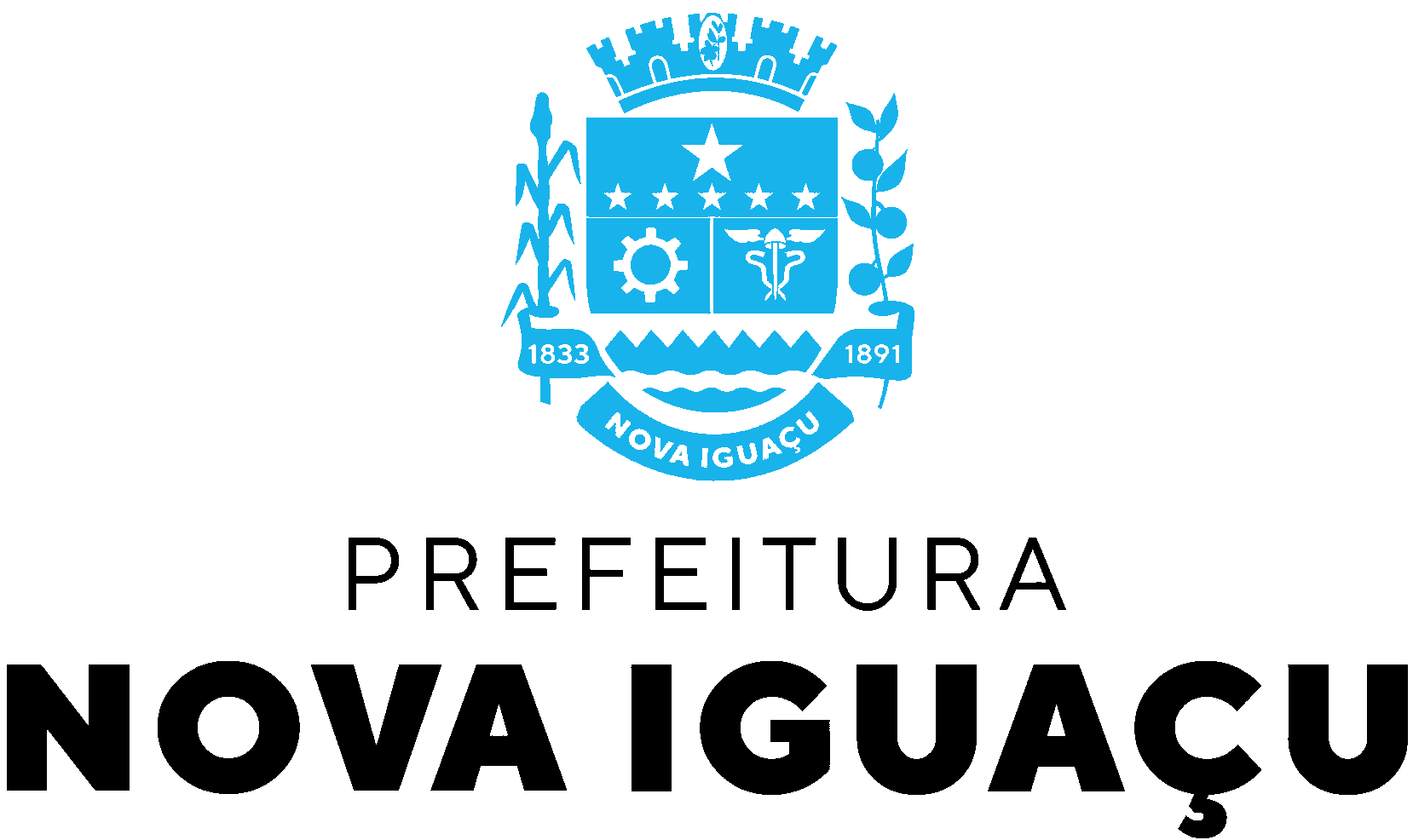
- Flag Coat of arms Logo

- Location of Nova Iguaçu

- Location within Brazil
- Coordinates: 22°45′32″S 43°27′03″W
- Country: Brazil
- Region: Southeast
- State: Rio de Janeiro
- Founded: 15 January 1833

Government
  - Mayor: Dudu Reina (PP)

Area
  - Total: 520.807 km^{2} (201.085 sq mi)
- Elevation: 25 m (82 ft)

Population (2024)
  - Total: 843,046
  - Density: 1,618.73/km^{2} (4,192.49/sq mi)
- Time zone: UTC−3 (BRT)
- Postal Code: 26000-000
- Area code: +55 21
- Website: www.novaiguacu.rj.gov.br

Nova Iguaçu (Brazilian Portuguese pronunciation: [ˈnɔvɐ iɡwɐˈsu]; 'New Iguaçu') is a municipality in Rio de Janeiro state in Brazil.

== Geography ==
=== Location ===
The city is named after the Iguaçu River that runs through it and empties into Guanabara Bay (not to be confused with the Iguaçu River in Paraná state, which forms the Iguaçu Falls). It is part of the Greater Rio de Janeiro metropolitan area. It was the state's second largest city in population until Mesquita was split off, and now it is the fourth largest behind São Gonçalo, Duque de Caxias and the state capital, Rio de Janeiro. It lies northwest of Rio de Janeiro, in the centre of the northern part of its metropolitan area, Baixada Fluminense. The current mayor is Rogério Lisboa (PR). The city is the seat of the Roman Catholic Diocese of Nova Iguaçu.

Nova Iguaçu has an estimated population of around 800,000 people. Although not best defined as a commuter town, it is a suburb of Rio de Janeiro under the influence of the capital – to which tens of thousands of workers and students commute daily, or visit regularly for options in culture, entertainment, goods, health care, etc. It is a city of average, lower middle income. There are a few historical and ecotouristical attractions in the municipality.

The municipality contains part of the Central Rio de Janeiro Atlantic Forest Mosaic of conservation units, created in 2006. It contains part of the 26,260-hectare (64,900-acre) Tinguá Biological Reserve, a strictly protected Atlantic Forest conservation unit created in 1989. It also contains the 2,353-hectare (5,810-acre) Jaceruba Environmental Protection Area, created in 2002. The municipality contains part of the 4,398-hectare (10,870-acre) Mendanha State Park, created in 2013.

== History ==
=== Colonial Brazil ===
Before the Portuguese arrived in Rio de Janeiro (in 1503), the Jacutinga Indians already inhabited the western bank of the Iguaçu River. This Indigenous tribe helped the French when they arrived in the region. Around 1565, after the expulsion of the French from Guanabara Bay, the village of São Sebastião do Rio de Janeiro was founded. There was at that time intense piracy promoted by French, British and Dutch privateers on the coast of the new Portuguese colony.

In 1575, the then governor of the captaincy of Rio de Janeiro, Antônio Salema, joined a Portuguese army supported by a troop of Amerindians indoctrinated with the purpose of exterminating the French and Tamoio area that had lasted for twenty years on the eastern coast of the captaincy. Fearful of losing their lands, the Tamoios still allied with the French, but were virtually wiped out because of the uprising, called the War of Cabo Frio. The victorious troops wiped out about 500 natives, enslaving other 1500. There were sentenced to be hanged two French, one English and one tupinambá shaman. Nevertheless, the troops entered the interior, burning villages and killing thousands of Tamoios. The War of Cabo Frio resulted, apart from the massacre, in the complete expulsion of the French in the region.

However, other European pirates, mainly British and Dutch, continued to steal Brazil wood, showing the War mostly useless, since the absence of colonization on the coast of Rio de Janeiro continued to provide profit to European privateers. There was no interest in colonizing the region of Cabo Frio after this massacre, but the settlers decided to populate the Recôncavo Fluminense (area around Guanabara Bay). They began to settle on the banks of major rivers in the region, especially the rivers Iguaçu, Meriti, Saratoga, Saracuruna, Jaguaré, Pilar, Marapicu, Jacutinga, Mantiqueira and Inhomirim.

Also in 1575, the Captain General Belchior Azeredo built a chapel in honor of St. Anthony, at the foot of a hill 750 meters from the greater curve of the Santo Antônio River, now River Saratoga, on the land of Jacutinga. The building, erected with mud, was crucial for Belchior Azeredo conquer the lands of the Jacutinga Indians in the form of land grants by Governor Cristóvão de Barros, baptizing them as Engenho Santo Antônio da Aldeia dos Jacutingas. The Captain General has granted himself an allotment near the Rio Magé, where he built a mill (coordinates: 22 º 45'38 "S, 43 º 23'23" W). In subsequent decades, the small chapel was raised in level of importance, ascending to other major designations in the church hierarchy of the region.

Since the occupation of the Iguaçu, Saratoga and Meriti river basin came into effect, which occurred from the late 16th century, the traditional Indian trade routes became roads. One, the long trail of the Jacutingas, was transformed into the Estrada Geral, which connected the Freguesia de Nossa Senhora da Conceição de Marapicu (current Marapicu) to the Freguesia de Santo Antônio da Aldeia dos Jacutingas (now Belford Roxo). The roadbed is currently occupied by the RJ-105 highway. The old bridge over the Saratoga River was the point of junction of the Estrada Geral with the Estrada Real (now Avenue Pastor Martin Luther King Jr.). The Royal Road went toward the Church of Nossa Senhora da Candelária, in downtown Rio de Janeiro, before passing over the Freguesia de São João do Orago do Rio Merity, by the port of Pavuna, by Inhaúma and the Freguesia de Nossa Senhora da Apresentação do Irajá.

These paths formed for a long time the best option to enter the land of the Recôncavo Fluminense, as access was difficult due to the large amount of wetlands and rivers of considerable width. To establish the route of the Estrada Real, were considered the best spots for transposition of the Saratoga and Meriti, noting where these rivers formed bars.

The colonization of the area required to route the flow of production of the mills. Initially, this was possible thanks to the waterways, when the rivers served as highways, once the Indian trade routes (and roads derived from them) were rough and the rivers were the easiest way to enter the Recôncavo region for its colonization.

=== Contraction ===
Nova Iguaçu was a much larger city in the past than its present form. The history of the city is marked by the emancipation of several districts that sought administrative independence.

The first break occurred on December 31, 1943, when the City Council ratified the emancipation of Duque de Caxias. In 1947, Nilópolis took their turn at emancipation. However, the most significant emancipations occurred in the 1990s.

Prior to the industrialization of Nova Iguaçu in the 1990s, it was a bedroom community for Rio de Janeiro. The city itself had practically no urban infrastructure, as its prior focus had been on citrus farming. By 1989, the city had grown to a population of 1.7 million, making it the sixth most populous city in Brazil at the time. In 1990, the district of Belford Roxo was emancipated, followed by Queimados, which had encompassed most of Nova Iguaçu's industrial district. In 1991, Japeri was emancipated, and in 1999, Mesquita.

These emancipations represented an economic blow to Nova Iguaçu, whose population (and hence, whose revenue) was greatly reduced, without a concomitant reduction in public spending.

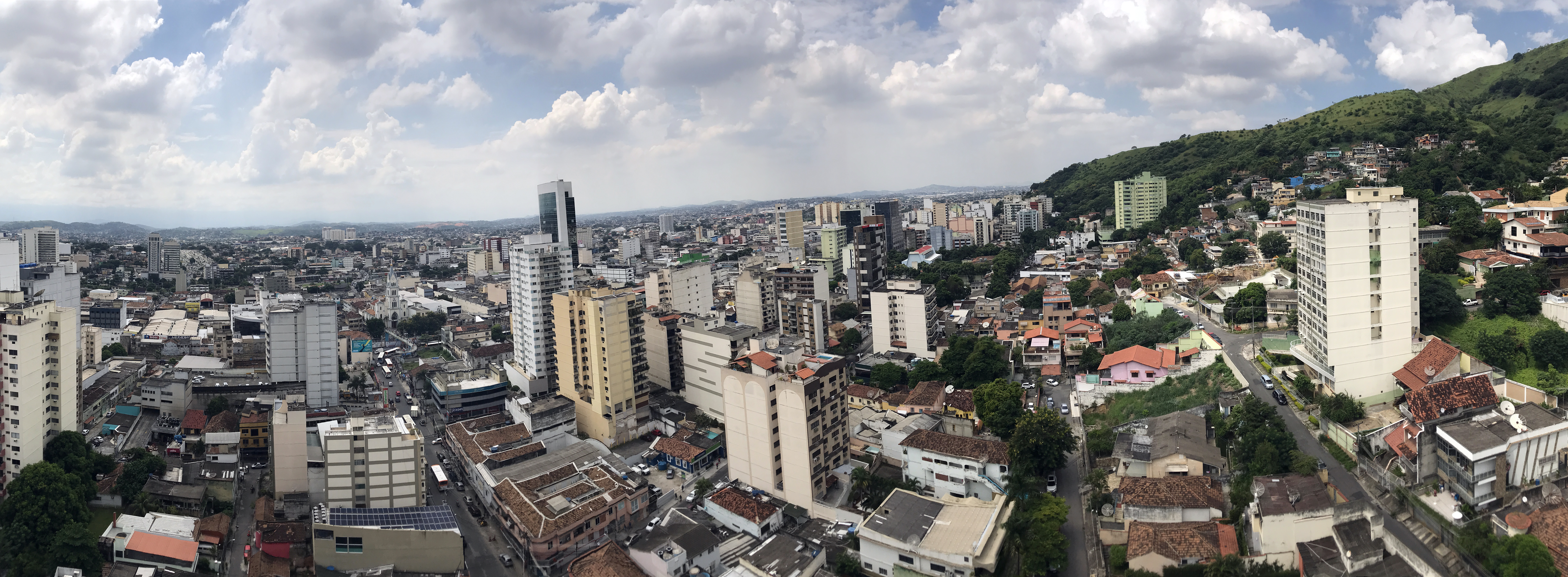

== Territorial organization ==
Nova Iguaçu is administratively divided into 5 sectors named Setores de Planejamento Integrado ("Integrated Planning Sectors"), 9 distritos (districts) named Unidades Regionais de Governo ("Regional Government Units") and 68 bairros (neighborhoods).

=== Sectors and districts ===
- Setor de Planejamento Integrado Centro: Unidade Regional de Governo Centro (URG I), Unidade Regional de Governo da Posse (URG II) and Unidade Regional de Governo de Comendador Soares (URG III).
- Setor de Planejamento Integrado Sudoeste: Unidade Regional de Governo de Cabuçu (URG IV) and Unidade Regional de Governo do KM 32 (URG V).
- Setor de Planejamento Integrado Noroeste: Unidade Regional de Governo de Austin (URG VI).
- Setor de Planejamento Integrado Nordeste: Unidade Regional de Governo de Vila de Cava (URG VII) and Unidade Regional de Governo de Miguel Couto (URG VIII).
- Setor de Planejamento Integrado Norte: Unidade Regional de Governo de Tinguá (URG IX).

=== Neighborhoods ===
- URG Centro (URG I): Bairro da Luz, Califórnia, Caonze, Centro, Chacrinha, Engenho Pequeno, Jardim Iguaçu, Jardim Tropical, Moquetá, Prata, Rancho Novo, Santa Eugênia, Viga, Vila Nova and Vila Operária.
- URG Posse (URG II): Ambaí, Bairro Botafogo, Carmary, Cerâmica, Kennedy, Nova América, Parque Flora, Ponto Chic, Posse and Três Corações.
- URG Comendador Soares (URG III): Comendador Soares, Danon, Jardim Alvorada, Jardim Nova Era, Jardim Palmares, Jardim Pernambuco, Ouro Verde and Rosa dos Ventos.
- URG Cabuçu (URG IV): Cabuçu, Campo Alegre, Ipiranga, Lagoinha, Marapicu, Palhada and Valverde.
- URG KM 32 (URG V): Jardim Guandu, KM 32, Paraíso and Prados Verdes.
- URG Austin (URG VI): Austin, Cacuia, Carlos Sampaio, Inconfidência, Riachão, Rodilândia, Tinguazinho and Vila Guimarães.
- URG Vila de Cava (URG VII): Corumbá, Figueiras, Iguaçu Velho, Rancho Fundo, Santa Rita and Vila de Cava.
- URG Miguel Couto (URG VIII): Boa Esperança, Geneciano, Grama, Miguel Couto and Parque Ambaí.
- URG Tinguá (URG IX): Adrianópolis, Jaceruba, Montevidéu, Rio d'Ouro and Tinguá.

== Demographics ==
Populational growth of Nova Iguaçu
Year	Population
1970	727 300
1980	843 987
1990	904 771
1995	800 043
2006	844 583
2011	795 212

The population of the city suffered a reduction after the enfranchisement of Mesquita in 1993. Today, the population is 795,212, up from the 727,300 in 1970, but down from the 844,583 in 2006. The racial makeup of the city in 2022 was 32.6% White, 48.7% Pardo (Multiracial), 18.6% Black, and 0.07% Amerindian.

When it comes to socioeconomic stratification, Class A population were 10.5%, Class B 55%, Class C 33.1% and Class D 2.4% of the population in 2011. These were according to income and property cohorts that take into account a Brazil-wide classification, rather than one specific to the metropolitan region of Rio de Janeiro.

== Sports ==
Nova Iguaçu Futebol Clube is the main football club from the city, with local rivals Artsul Futebol Clube.

There is also Maxambomba Rugby Club, the first rugby team formed in the Baixada Fluminense area.

== Notable people ==
- Allan dos Santos, journalist
- Deivid, football player
- Emerson Sheik, football player
- Zinho, football player
- Cassiane, gospel singer
- Ana Paula Maia, writer and screenwriter

== Rail accidents ==
- On June 7, 1951, the city was the site of a level crossing disaster in which 54 people were killed when a train struck a gasoline truck.
- On 30 August 2007, two trains collided in the city, killing at least eight people.
