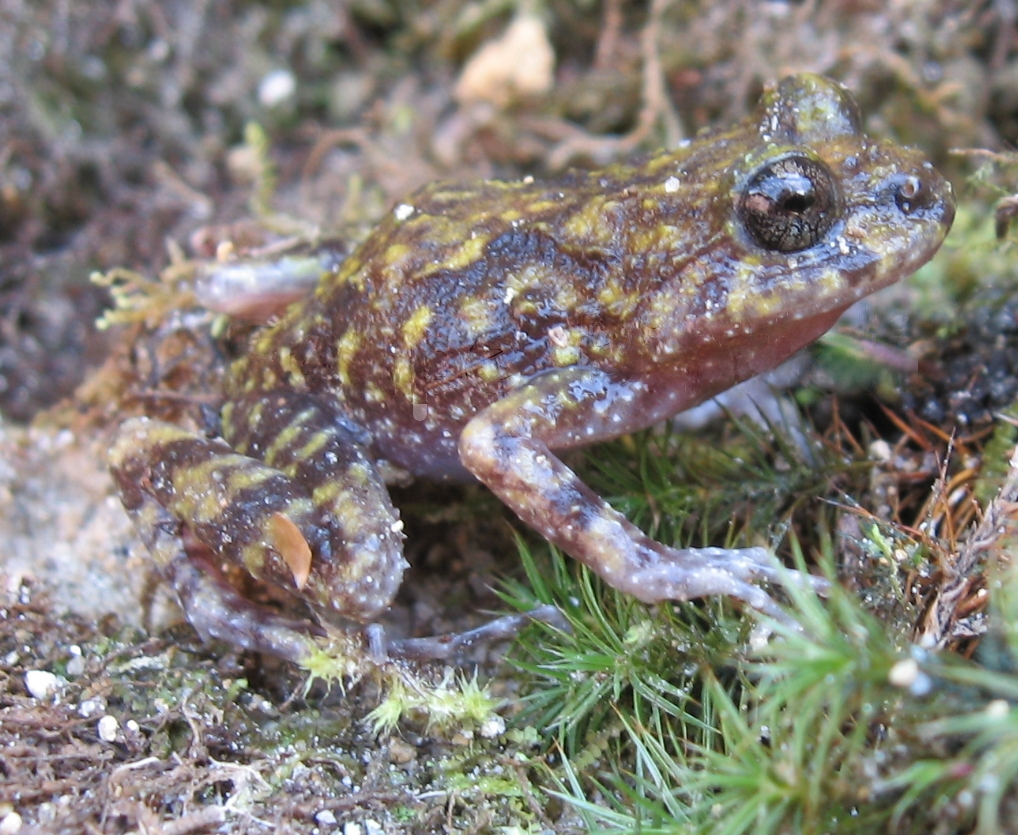

Conservation status
- Least Concern (IUCN 3.1)

Scientific classification
- Kingdom: Animalia
- Phylum: Chordata
- Class: Amphibia
- Order: Anura
- Family: Cycloramphidae
- Genus: Cycloramphus
- Species: C. eleutherodactylus

Binomial name
- Cycloramphus eleutherodactylus (Miranda-Ribeiro, 1920)

Synonyms
- Iliodiscus eleutherodactylus Miranda-Ribeiro, 1920; Grypiscus eleutherodactylus (Miranda-Ribeiro, 1920)

= Cycloramphus eleutherodactylus =

Species of frog

Cycloramphus eleutherodactylus is a species of frog in the family Cycloramphidae. It is endemic to the Serra do Mar in southeastern Brazil, including the Serra dos Órgãos, Serra da Mantiqueira, and Serra da Bocaina. Common name Alto button frog has been coined for it.

== Description ==
Adult males measure 36–38 mm (1.4–1.5 in) and adult females 35–42 mm (1.4–1.7 in) in snout–vent length. The snout is almost semicircular from above and rounded in profile. No tympanum is externally visible. The supratympanic fold is weak. The finger and toe tips are slightly swollen but have no discs. Fingers are without webbing and usually without fringes; the toes have neither. The dorsum is black with small light green spots on the body and bands on limbs. The venter is black with white dots, particularly on the throat and chest. The iris is bronzy brown and has several pale blue-gray areas radiating down below pupil.

== Habitat and conservation ==
Cycloramphus eleutherodactylus is a strict forest inhabitant found at elevations of 100–1,100 m (330–3,610 ft) above sea level. It lives on the ground and is usually not associated with water. It is typically found at night on ground and in tree stumps, but has also been found under stones and logs during daytime. Presumably, reproduction is by terrestrial larval development.

Cycloramphus eleutherodactylus is locally threatened by habitat loss caused by urbanization, agriculture, silviculture, and cattle production. Its range, however, includes many protected areas.
