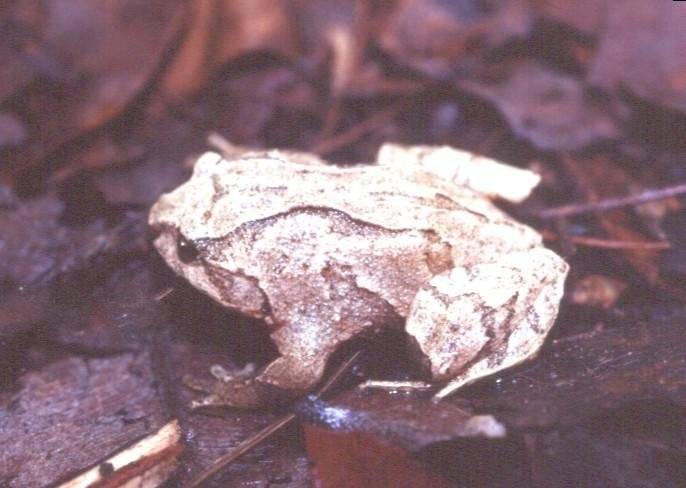
- Zachaenus parvulus

Scientific classification
- Domain: Eukaryota
- Kingdom: Animalia
- Phylum: Chordata
- Class: Amphibia
- Order: Anura
- Family: Cycloramphidae
- Genus: Zachaenus; Cope, 1866

Type species
- Cystignathus parvulus Girard, 1853

Synonyms
- Oocormus Boulenger, 1905

= Zachaenus =

Genus of amphibians

Zachaenus is a genus of frogs in the family Cycloramphidae. There are two species that both are endemic to southeastern Brazil. Common name bug-eyed frogs has been coined for the genus.

== Ecology ==
Zachaenus are leaf-litter inhabitants of the Atlantic rainforest of southeastern Brazil.

== Species ==
The genus contains the following species:

- Zachaenus carvalhoi Izecksohn, 1983
- Zachaenus parvulus (Girard, 1853)
