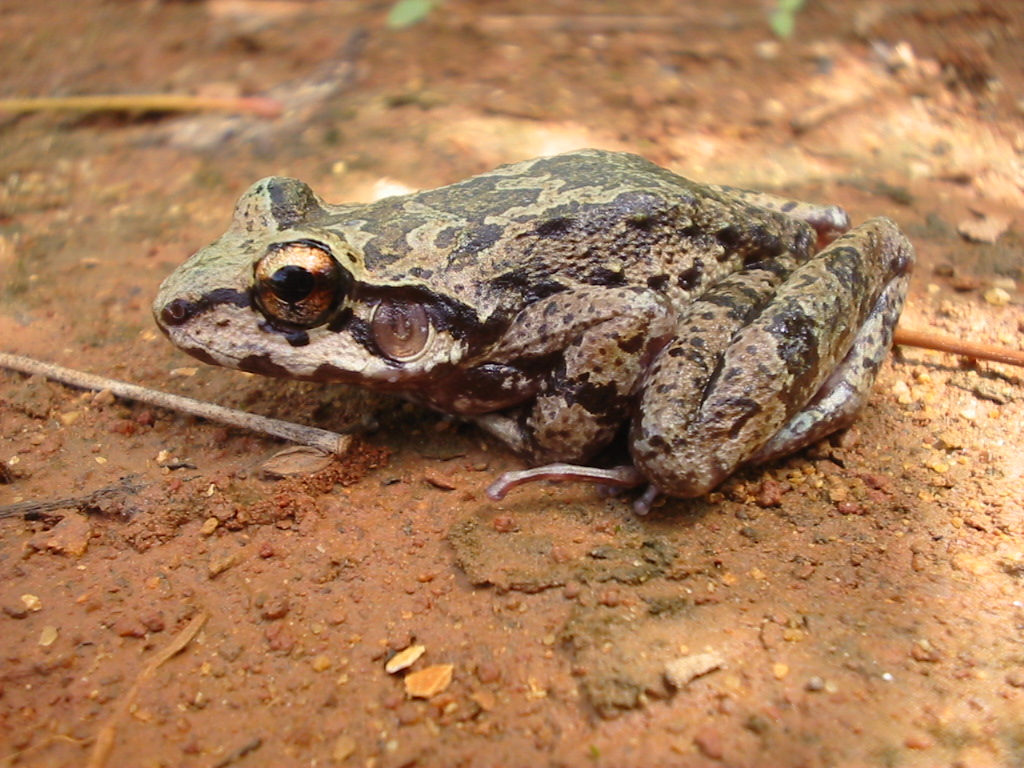
- Thoropa miliaris

Scientific classification
- Kingdom: Animalia
- Phylum: Chordata
- Class: Amphibia
- Order: Anura
- Family: Cycloramphidae
- Genus: Thoropa; Cope, 1865

Type species
- Cystignathus missiessii Eydoux and Souleyet, 1842

Species
- 7 species (see text)

= Thoropa =

Genus of amphibians

Thoropa is a genus of frogs in the family Cycloramphidae. They are endemic to eastern and southeastern Brazil. They are sometimes known as river frogs.

== Description, ecology, and behavior ==
Thoropa are associated with rocks and have cryptic coloration. Their size ranges from small to medium, 28–102 mm (1.1–4.0 in) in snout–vent length. They occur at elevations up to 1,500 m (4,900 ft) above sea level; Thoropa miliaris and Thoropa taophora can even live on rocky marine shores, foraging in the intertidal zone. Male Thoropa are associated with wet rock faces, whereas the females seem to range more widely.

In species where reproduction is known, males are territorial—suitable wet rock faces are a scarce resource. Furthermore, mature male Thoropa feature characteristic clusters of dark spines on the inner portions of the hand. It appears that these are associated with male-male combat, probably in conjunction with territorial disputes. Scratch marks in males, but not in females, support this interpretation.

The eggs are laid on rocks with a thin layer of water. Tadpoles are semiterrestrial and have a depressed shape, long tail, and bulging eyes.

Male T. taophora frogs mate exclusively and repeatedly with two females per season in a polygynous system in which the semiterrestrial tadpoles from both females share the same freshwater seep. The females have a dominance hierarchy, and the males mate more with the dominant female.

== Species ==
The genus contains the following species:

- Thoropa bryomantis Assis, Lacerda, Guimarães, Peixoto, Luna, and Feio, 2021
- Thoropa lutzi Cochran, 1938
- Thoropa megatympanum Caramaschi and Sazima, 1984
- Thoropa miliaris (Spix, 1824)
- Thoropa petropolitana (Wandolleck, 1907)
- Thoropa saxatilis Cocroft and Heyer, 1988
- Thoropa taophora (Miranda-Ribeiro, 1923)
