= Thoropa saxatilis =

Conservation status
- Near Threatened (IUCN 3.1)

Scientific classification
- Kingdom: Animalia
- Phylum: Chordata
- Class: Amphibia
- Order: Anura
- Family: Cycloramphidae
- Genus: Thoropa
- Species: T. saxatilis

Binomial name
- Thoropa saxatilis Cocroft and Heyer, 1988

Species of frog

Thoropa saxatilis is a species of frog in the family Cycloramphidae. It is endemic to southern Brazil and occurs in the Santa Catarina and Rio Grande do Sul states, corresponding to the southernmost extent of the Atlantic Forest biome. The specific name saxatilis refers to its association with rocks. Common name Brazilian river frog has been coined for it.

== Description ==
Adult males measure 41–58 mm (1.6–2.3 in) in snout–vent length. The snout is rounded. The tympanum is distinct and relatively large (about as large as the eye ); the prominent supratympanic fold partly hides the tympanum dorsally. Finger tips have prominent discs; those of the toes are less prominent. The thumbs have a dark cluster of spines, and fingers have II–III rows of spines. Both fingers and toes have lateral ridges but no webbing. Preserved specimens are mottled with dark and light brown or grey. The upper surfaces of the limbs are barred. The venter is cream with some brown wash. No vocal sac is present.

The tadpoles are elongated and have a depressed body and a low tail fin with rounded tip. The largest tadpoles (Gosner stage 39) measure 34 mm (1.3 in) in total length. The body makes about third (29–33%) of the total length.

== Habitat and conservation ==
Thoropa saxatilis occurs on rocky cliffs in forested areas at elevations of 300–1,000 m (980–3,280 ft) above sea level. The holotype was collected on a rock near a small waterfall. Other adult males have been collected along road cuts where water was trickling over steep rock faces; tadpoles were collected from the same habitat. The eggs are laid under waterfalls on rocks.

It is a rarely collected species, and it appears to have disappeared from some localities. It can be threatened by habitat loss and modification (alteration of water causes, sedimentation, forest loss), but it has also vanished from some areas of apparently suitable habitat. Chytridiomycosis is a possible threat. The species is present in the Serra Geral and Aparados da Serra National Parks.
