= Thoropa lutzi =

Conservation status
- Endangered (IUCN 3.1)

Scientific classification
- Kingdom: Animalia
- Phylum: Chordata
- Class: Amphibia
- Order: Anura
- Family: Cycloramphidae
- Genus: Thoropa
- Species: T. lutzi

Binomial name
- Thoropa lutzi Cochran, 1938

Species of frog

Thoropa lutzi is a species of frog in the family Cycloramphidae. The species is endemic to Brazil.

== Etymology ==
The specific name, lutzi, is in honor of Brazilian parasitologist Adolfo Lutz.

== Geographic range ==
Thoropa lutzi is found in southeastern Brazil, in the Brazilian states of Espírito Santo, Minas Gerais, and Rio de Janeiro, at altitudes of 200–800 m (660–2,620 ft).

== Habitat ==
The preferred natural habitats of Thoropa lutzi are subtropical or tropical moist lowland forest, rivers, and rocky areas.

== Behavior ==
Adults and larvae of Thoropa lutzi live on wet rock walls.

== Reproduction ==
The adult female Thoropa lutzi deposits her egg clutch in a rock fissure.

== Conservation status ==
Thoropa lutzi is threatened by habitat loss.
