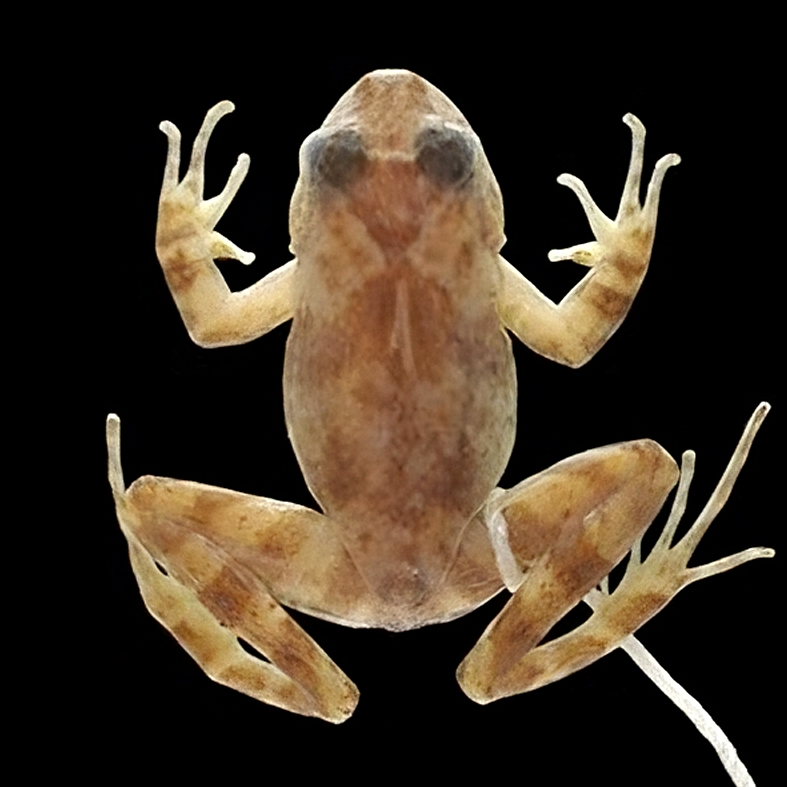

Conservation status
- Critically Endangered (IUCN 3.1)

Scientific classification
- Kingdom: Animalia
- Phylum: Chordata
- Class: Amphibia
- Order: Anura
- Family: Cycloramphidae
- Genus: Thoropa
- Species: T. petropolitana

Binomial name
- Thoropa petropolitana (Wandolleck, 1907)

Synonyms
- Hylodes petropolitanus Wandolleck, 1907; Elosia petropolitanus — Boulenger, 1909; Ololigon abbreviatus petropolitana — Miranda-Ribeiro, 1923; Eleutherodactylus petropolitanus — Müller, 1927; Borborocoetes petropolitanus — Noble, 1927; Thoropa petropolitana — Lutz, 1947; Bokermann, 1965; Lynch, 1972; Eupsophus petropolitanus — Cochran, 1955 "1954"

= Thoropa petropolitana =

Species of frog

Thoropa petropolitana is a species of frog in the family Cycloramphidae. It is endemic to Serra dos Órgãos in the state of Rio de Janeiro, Brazil; there are also unconfirmed records from the neighboring Espírito Santo and São Paulo states.

== Habitat and conservation ==
Thoropa petropolitana occurs at elevations above 800 m (2,600 ft) in rocky areas in forest, or on the forest edge, where it lives on wet rock faces near streams or waterfalls. The eggs are deposited in rock fissures. This formerly common species has undergone significant declines. Threats to it include habitat loss caused by clear-cutting, human settlement, tourism, and fire. However, it has also declined in areas with suitable habitat, suggesting that chytridiomycosis might be a factor. This species occurs in the Serra dos Órgãos National Park, but the park does not protect it from impacts of tourism.
