= Rio dos Cedros =

Coordinates: 26°44′S 49°16′W

- Municipality
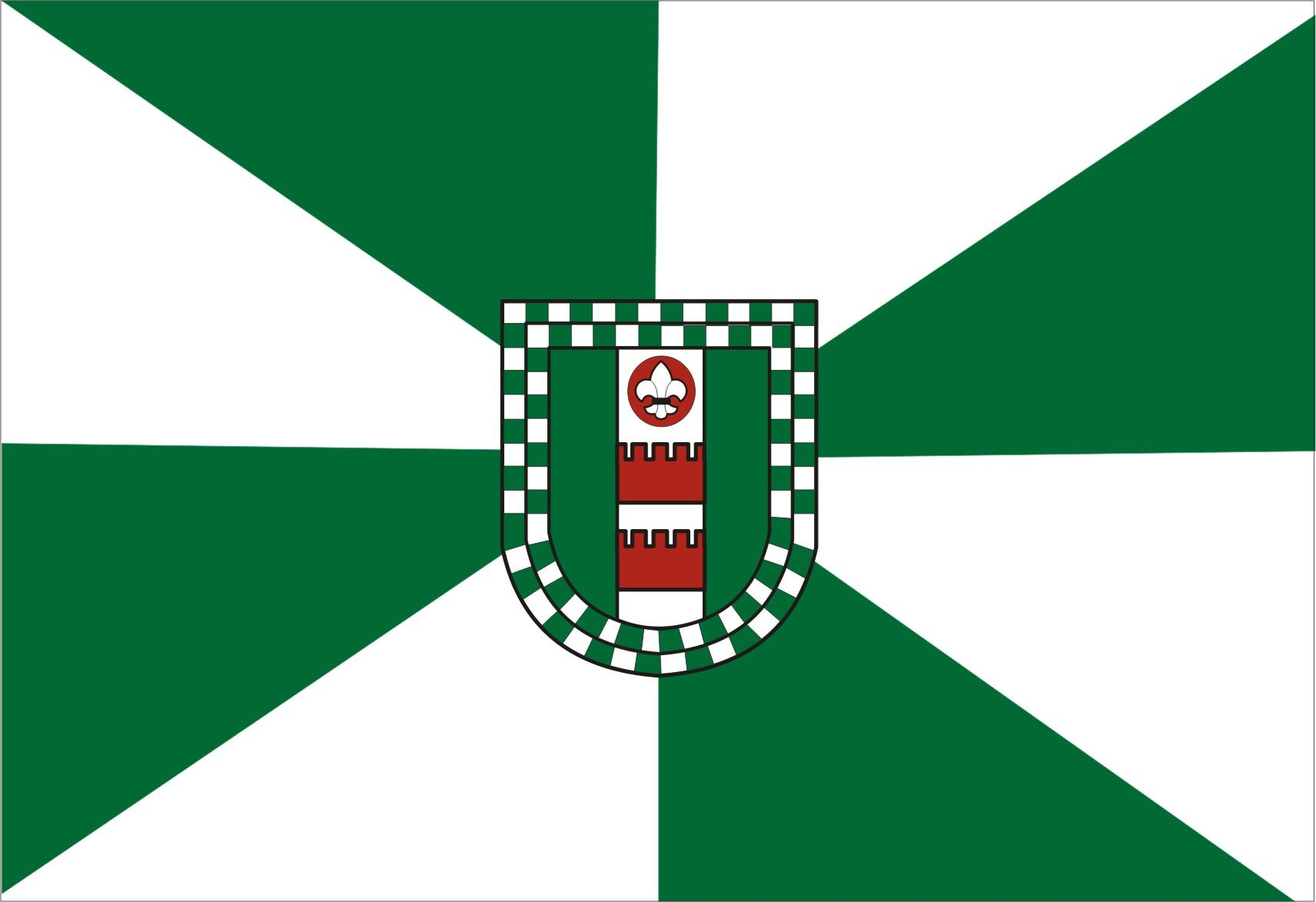
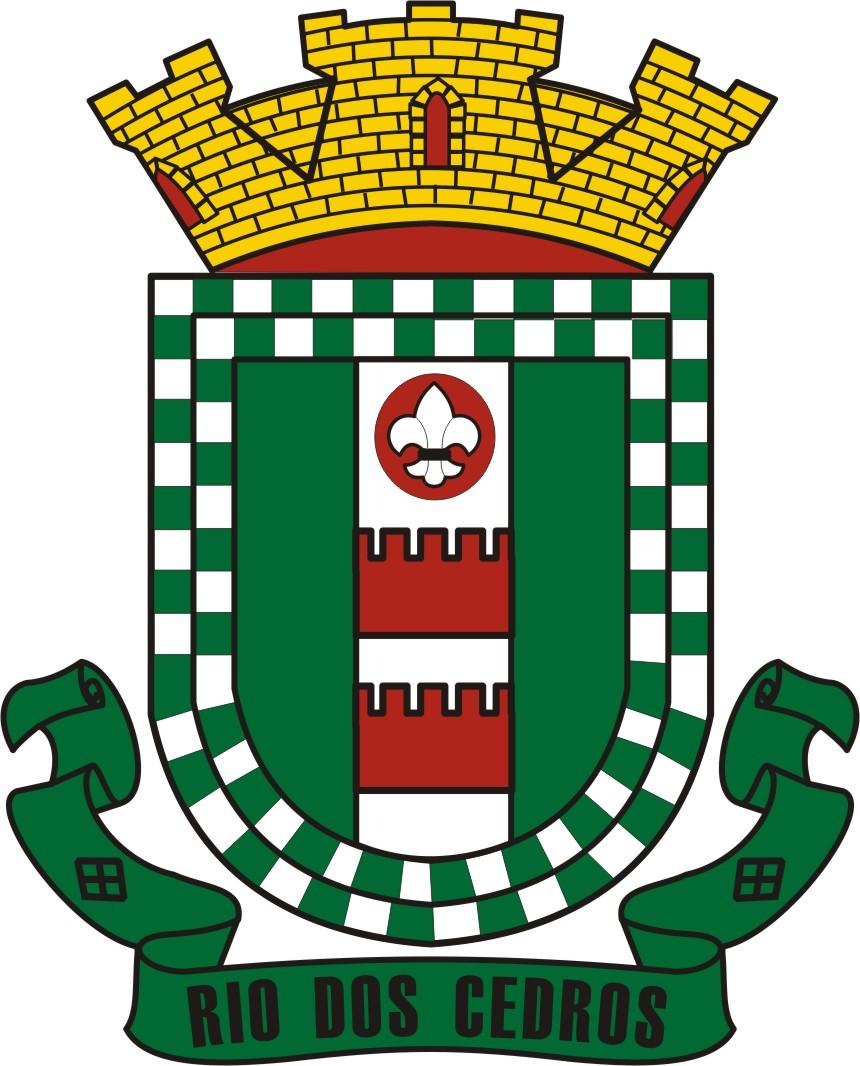
- Flag Coat of arms

- Country: Brazil
- Region: South
- State: Santa Catarina
- Mesoregion: Vale do Itajai

Population (2020)
  - Total: 11,808
- Time zone: UTC -3

Rio dos Cedros is a municipality in the state of Santa Catarina in the South region of Brazil.

== See also ==
- List of municipalities in Santa Catarina
