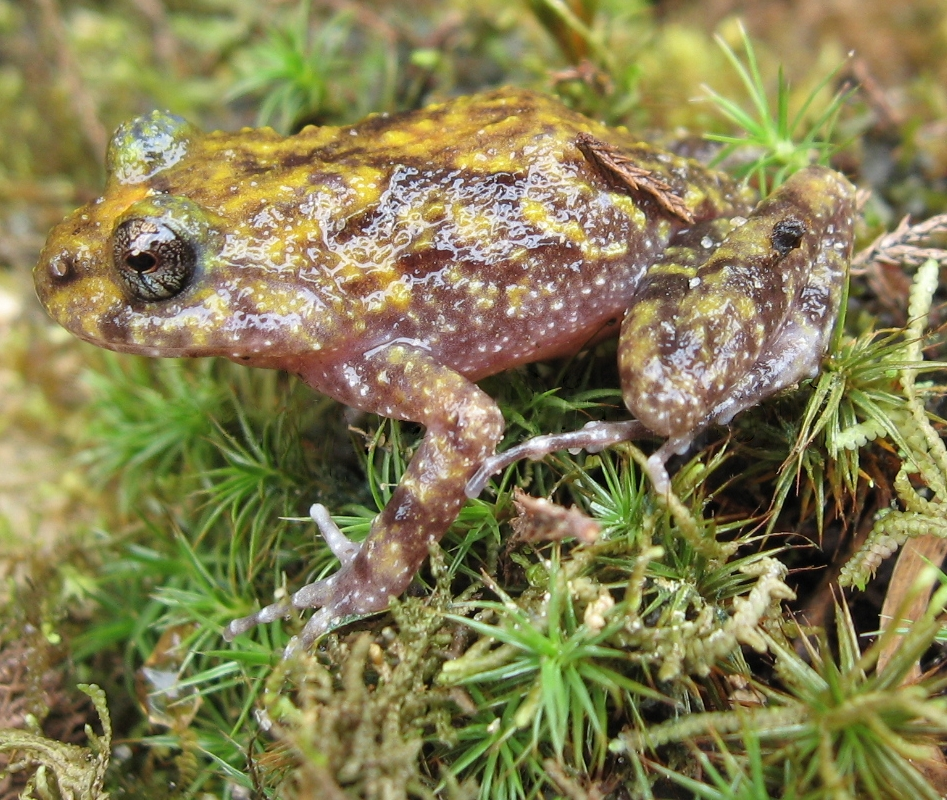
- Cycloramphus eleutherodactylus

Scientific classification
- Domain: Eukaryota
- Kingdom: Animalia
- Phylum: Chordata
- Class: Amphibia
- Order: Anura
- Superfamily: Hyloidea
- Family: Cycloramphidae; Bonaparte, 1850

Type genus
- Cycloramphus Tschudi, 1838

Genera
- Cycloramphus; Thoropa; Zachaenus

= Cycloramphidae =

Family of amphibians

The Cycloramphidae are a family of frogs endemic to southeastern Brazil. This family has seen large changes in its composition. Genera that have at some point been included in the Cycloramphidae are at present placed in the Alsodidae, Hylodidae, Leptodactylidae, and Rhinodermatidae. Of these, the Alsodidae and/or Hylodidae have also been considered as subfamilies of Cycloramphidae (as, respectively, Alsodinae and Hylodinae); the Cycloramphidae, as recognized at present, would be similar to subfamily Cycloramphinae under such system.

== Genera ==
There are 36 species in three genera:

- Cycloramphus Tschudi, 1838
- Thoropa Cope, 1865
- Zachaenus Cope, 1866

The AmphibiaWeb omits Zachaenus from this family, considering its placement within Hyloidea as uncertain.
