= Acari River (Rio de Janeiro) =

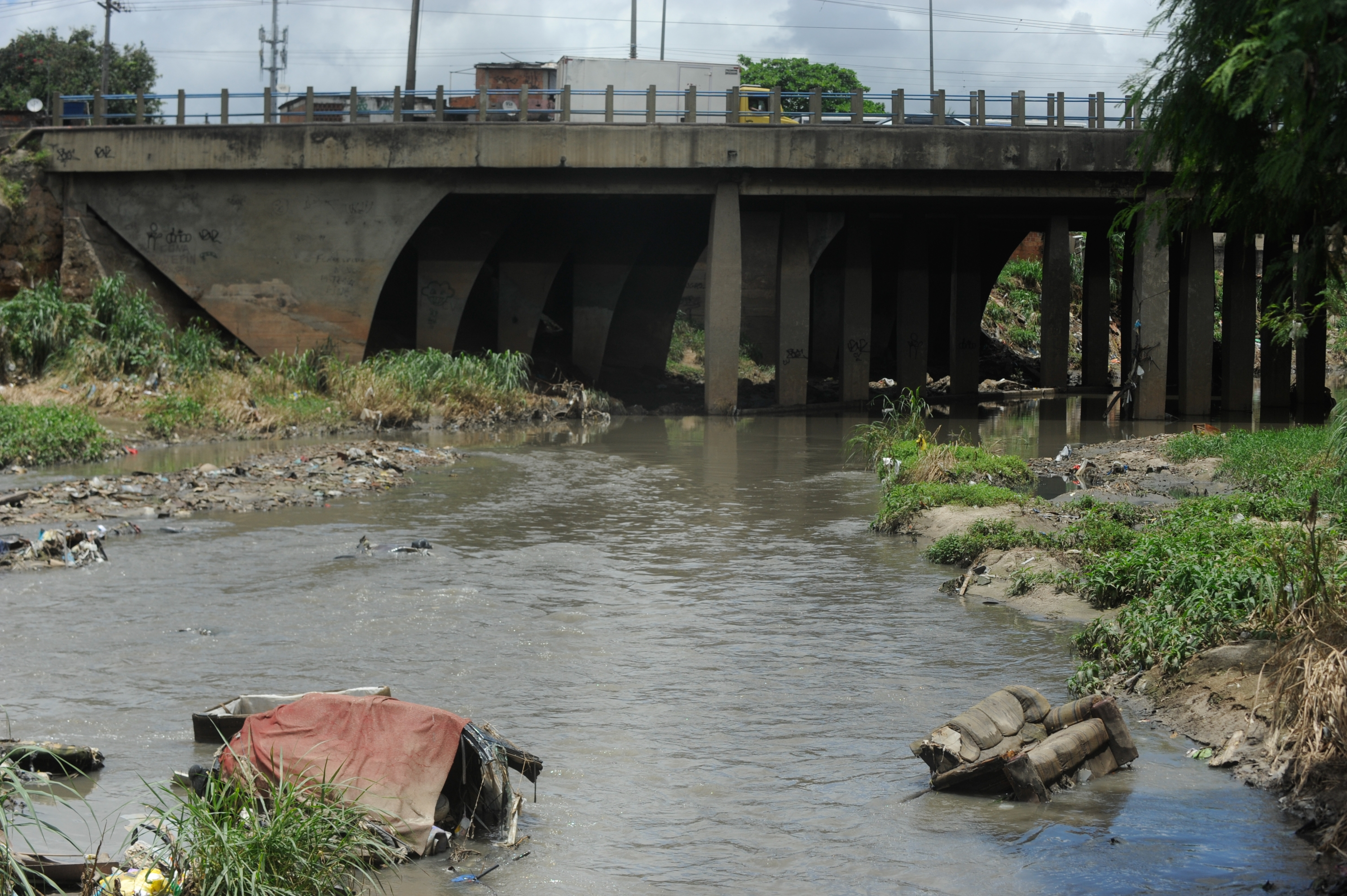

Location
- Country: Brazil

Physical characteristics
- Source
  - location: Serra do Gericinó, Rio de Janeiro state
- Mouth
  - location: Rio Meriti
  - coordinates: 22°48′9″S 43°19′41″W

The Acari River is located in Rio de Janeiro state in southeastern Brazil. It is one of the major watercourses of the city of Rio de Janeiro.

The name is of Guarani origin, a corruption of aqûâ-ára-i, meaning "enduring current". It is not related to the Loricariidae Acari fish.

== Course ==
The Acari River rises in the Serra do Gericinó with its mouth on the Rio Meriti which separates the city of Rio from Duque de Caxias. The Acari flows through the city from the extreme west to the zona norte.

It is navigable but as it traverses the territories of three separate criminal gangs it has ceased to be used as a waterway.

== Ecology ==
The river is not silted up and has a very large flow of water with riparian vegetation in some areas. It was one of the last of the rivers of Rio to suffer from macrobiological death.

Alligators can still be found in the river, but there are no longer any freshwater shrimp present. There is a popular wish for the river to be cleaned up and to become a major source of local income by offering recreation, fishing and transportation.

== See also ==
- Maracanã River in Rio de Janeiro city.
- List of rivers of Rio de Janeiro state
