= Caminhos Language Centre =

Portuguese language learning centre in Ipanema, Rio de Janeiro, Brazil

- Founded: March, 2009
- Founder: Bart Bijen, Jascha Lewkowitz
- Type: Non Profit Organisation
- Location: Rua Farme de Amoedo, 135, Ipanema, Rio de Janeiro, Brazil
- Region served: Rio de Janeiro, Brazil
- Services: Language Learning
- Method: Raising fund through education for charity
- Key people: Director: Jascha Lewkowitz; Founders: Bart Bijen, Jascha Lewkowitz
- Website: www.caminhoslanguages.com

Caminhos Language Centre is a Portuguese language learning centre, situated in Ipanema in Rio de Janeiro state. It was founded in March 2009 by the Association of Friends of Casa do Caminho as a non-profit organization to financially support and assist Casa do Caminho Abrigo Orphanage in Xerém in Rio de Janeiro, which houses about 35 children. All profits from tuition and course fees go directly to the orphanage.
