= Casa do Caminho Abrigo =

Orphan home in Brazil

Casa do Caminho Abrigo is an orphanage that was founded in 1982. It is situated in Xerém, Brazil. Casa do Caminho provides shelter and complementary education to give children and adolescents, living in a risky situation (mainly between 4 and 18 years), a chance for a better future. The children and adolescents arrive at Casa do Caminho through the juvenile court and foster care (Conselho Tutelar). The orphanage home gets its financial support mainly from Casa do Caminho Language Centre, Ipanema, Rio de Janeiro.

Casa do Caminho Abrigo offers a wide variety of learning opportunities for children and adolescents in vulnerable situations while the organization maintains itself by offering products and services.
