= Estádio de Los Larios =

Football stadium in Xerém, Brazil

Coordinates: 22°36′39″S 43°19′50″W

- Interactive map of Estádio de Los Larios
- Former names: CT do Tigres
- Location: Xerém, Duque de Caxias, RJ, Brasil
- Owner: Esporte Clube Tigres do Brasil
- Capacity: 11,000
- Surface: Grass

Construction
- Opened: January 18, 2009

Tenant
- Esporte Clube Tigres do Brasil (2009–)

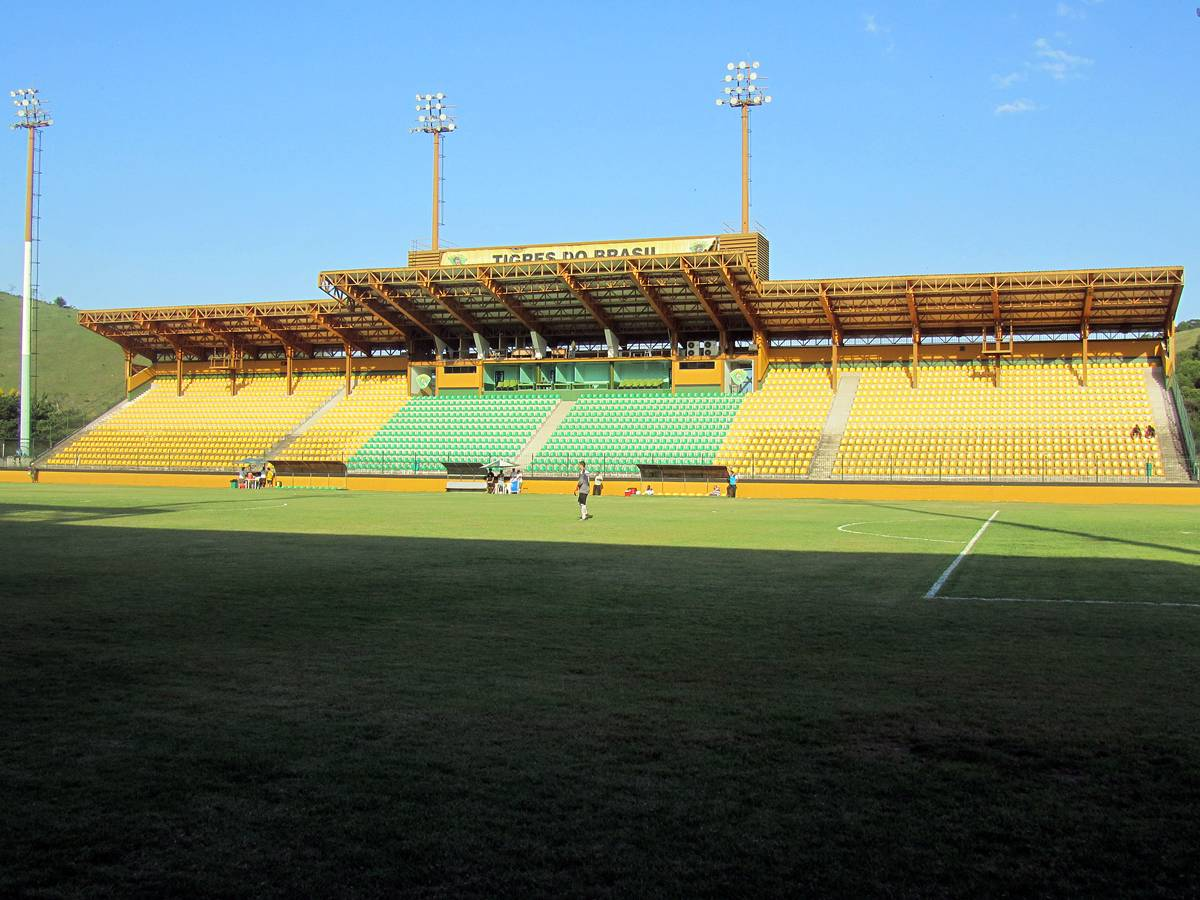

Estádio de Los Larios is a football stadium located in Xerém, a district of Duque de Caxias, Rio de Janeiro, Brazil. The stadium is owned by Tigres do Brasil. It has a maximum capacity of 11,000 people. The stadium is named after the club's founders, the Larios family.

== History ==
Initially, the stadium was used as a training center, named CT do Tigres. It was used as the home ground of Tigres do Brasil in 2008 for the Campeonato Carioca Segunda Divisão, without having an official name at the time.

The stadium was officially inaugurated on January 18, 2009, with two games. The first game was an all-star game, in which players such as Carlos Alberto Torres, Ricardo Rocha, Vampeta, and Adílio participated. The second game was a friendly game between Tigres do Brasil and Danubio of Uruguay. The game ended 4–4. The first official competition game played in the stadium was the Campeonato Carioca game between Tigres do Brasil and Vasco, played on January 28, 2009. Vasco won 4–0.
