= Santa Cruz da Serra =

- Coordinates: 22.6420002°S 43.296453°W
- Country: Brazil
- State: Rio de Janeiro
- City: Duque de Caxias

Santa Cruz da Serra is a neighborhood in the Brazilian state of Rio de Janeiro, located in the 3rd district of the city of Duque de Caxias, 20 km (12 mi) from Petrópolis and 35 km (22 mi) from the city center. To reach the district, one must take the Rodovia Washington Luiz (BR-040) to exit 107, towards Petrópolis or exit 105, towards Rio de Janeiro.

Santa Cruz da Serra is one of the main gateways to the district of Imbariê and serves as a stop for many people who go to Petropolis and throughout the mountain region. It is located near the district of Xerém.
