= Marcelly Morena =

Brazilian singer and samba dancer (born 1986)

- Born: c.1986 Duque de Caxias
- Occupation: Singer
- Known for: Samba dancer

Marcelly Morena (born c.1986) is a Brazilian singer and samba dancer who, in 2016, became the first transgender woman to dance as a passista in Rio de Janeiro's Carnival. Passistas lead a marching band for the entire length of the Carnival parade.

Morena was born in and grew up in Duque de Caxias, a suburb city of Rio de Janeiro, and danced from a young age. By the age of nine, she felt out of place in the male body she was born with. She left home by sixteen and was alienated from her family because her father did not accept her gender identity. Later, she would visit her mother, who provided her with women's clothes and makeup.

As a singer, Morena formerly performed as part of a transgender group named As Peguetes, and more recently performs as half of the funk duo Karlos & Marcelly Morena.

In 2016, she was invited by her Samba school Acadêmicos do Grande Rio to dance as their Carnival passista.

In 2018, she became a spokesperson for Rio Sem Homophobia ("Rio without homophobia"), an education and outreach program by Rio's Centro de Cidadania LGBT ("LGBT Citizenship Centre").
