= Esporte Clube Tigres do Brasil =

Tigres do Brasil
- Full name: Esporte Clube Tigres do Brasil
- Nickname(s): Fera da Baixada
- Founded: January 19, 2004
- Ground: Estádio De Los Larios
- Capacity: 11,000
- Chairman: (Argentina) Aristóteles Larios
- Manager: (Brazil) Emanoel Sacramento
Home colours	Away colours

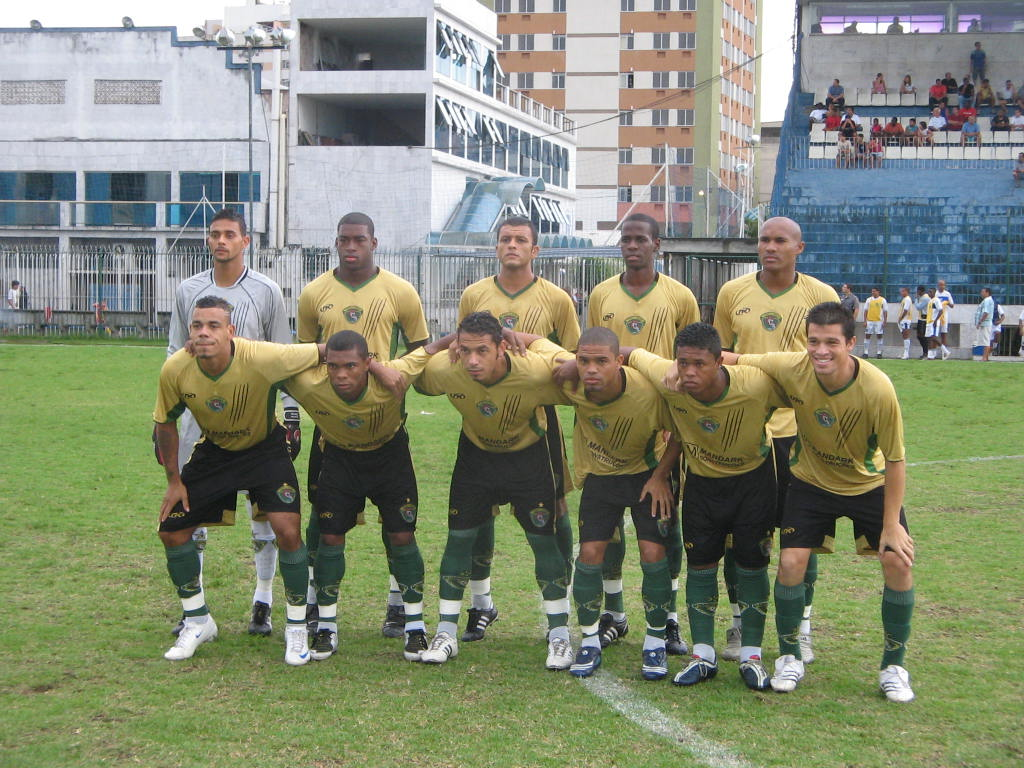
Team photo from the 2008 season

Esporte Clube Tigres do Brasil is a Brazilian football team from the city of Duque de Caxias, Rio de Janeiro state, founded on January 19, 2004.

== History ==
The club was founded on January 19, 2004 as Esporte Clube Poland do Brasil due to a partnership with Poland Química, which is a chemical company. Esporte Clube Poland do Brasil was renamed to is current name, Esporte Clube Tigres do Brasil during the final months of 2004. The club, managed by Flávio Silva, won its first title in 2005, which was the Copa Rio. Tigres do Brasil competed in the Campeonato Carioca 2009 season.

== Honours ==
=== Official tournaments ===
State
Competitions	Titles	Seasons
Copa Rio	2	2005, 2009

=== Others tournaments ===
==== State ====
- Taça Corcovado (1): 2014

=== Runners-up ===
- Campeonato Carioca Série A2 (2): 2008, 2014

== Stadium ==
Tigres do Brasil's home stadium is Estádio De Los Larios, inaugurated in 2009 and located in Xerém district, Duque de Caxias. It has a maximum capacity of 11,000 people. The club previously played at Estádio Giulite Coutinho, also known as Estádio Édson Passos, inaugurated in 2000, with a maximum capacity of 16,000 people.

== Colors ==
The club's official colors are green, white and yellow.

== Current squad ==
Note: Flags indicate national team as defined under FIFA eligibility rules; some limited exceptions apply. Players may hold more than one non-FIFA nationality.

No.	Pos.	Nation	Player
—	GK	(Brazil) BRA	Santiago
—	DF	(Brazil) BRA	Wallace
—	DF	(Brazil) BRA	Paulão
—	DF	(Brazil) BRA	Rony
—	DF	(Brazil) BRA	Vitinho
—	DF	(Brazil) BRA	Rafael Lima
—	DF	(Brazil) BRA	Oliveira
—	DF	(Brazil) BRA	Thiago Gama
—	MF	(Brazil) BRA	Sapo
—	MF	(Brazil) BRA	Xandinho
—	MF	(Brazil) BRA	Chamel
—	MF	(Brazil) BRA	Dudu

No.	Pos.	Nation	Player
