= Maracanã River (Rio de Janeiro) =

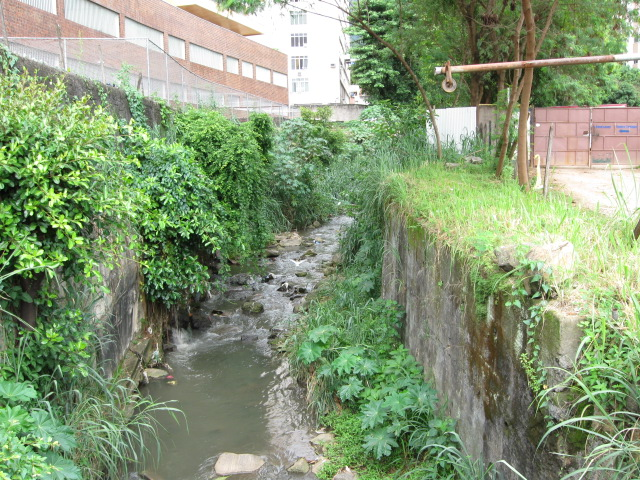

Location
- Country: Brazil
- State: Rio de Janeiro state
- City: Rio de Janeiro

Physical characteristics
- Source
  - location: Maciço do Tijuca/Sumaré Hill
- Mouth
  - location: Guanabara Bay
  - coordinates: 22°54′S 43°13′W
  - elevation: sea level
- Length: 7 km

The Maracanã River of Rio de Janeiro (Portuguese: [mɐɾakɐˈnɐ̃]), which means parrot-like in Tupi–Guarani, is a river located in Rio de Janeiro state in southeastern Brazil.

== Course ==
The Maracanã River flows, now canalized, eastwards through the northern districts and neighbourhoods of the city of Rio de Janeiro to its mouth at the Canal do Mangue, that eventually flows into Guanabara Bay.

== Namesakes ==
The Estádio do Maracanã, one of the largest football stadiums in the world, was named after the Maracanã River. The nearby and smaller Ginásio do Maracanãzinho indoor arena is a derivative name, Maracanãzinho meaning Little Maracanã.

The subsequently developed Maracanã neighbourhood around the stadium and that which the river flows through, took its name from the stadium.

== See also ==
- Acari River in Rio de Janeiro city
- Meriti River in Rio de Janeiro city
- List of rivers of Rio de Janeiro state
- Maracanã River (Amazonas)
