= Maracanã Stadium =

Stadium in Rio de Janeiro, Brazil

Coordinates: 22°54′44″S 43°13′49″W

- Estádio do Maracanã
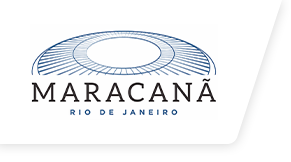

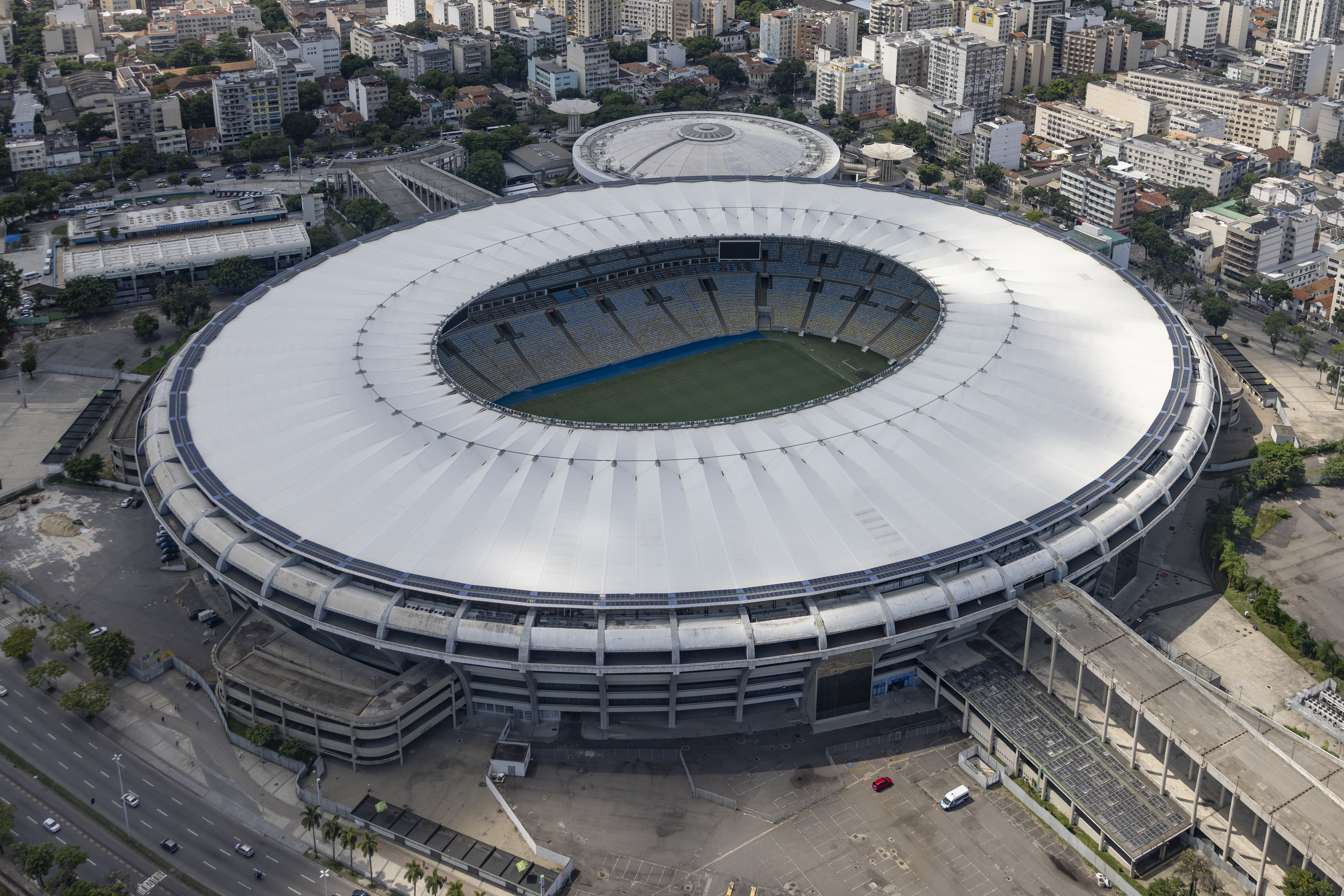
- Sisbrace
- Interactive map of Maracanã Stadium
- Full name: Estádio Jornalista Mário Filho
- Former names: Estádio Municipal (1950–1966)
- Location: Maracanã, Rio de Janeiro, Brazil
- Owner: Rio de Janeiro State Government
- Operator: Flamengo and Fluminense
- Capacity: 73,139
- Surface: Grass
- Record attendance: 173,850 (officially)
- Field size: 105 m × 68 m (344 ft × 223 ft)
- Public transit: Maracanã Station; SuperVia train services Metrô Rio line 2

Construction
- Groundbreaking: 2 July 1948
- Opened: 16 June 1950
- Renovated: 2000, 2006, 2013
- Architects: Waldir Ramos, Raphael Galvão, Miguel Feldman, Oscar Valdetaro, Pedro Paulo B. Bastos, Orlando Azevedo, Antônio Dias Carneiro

Tenants
- Botafogo (1950–2007); Flamengo (1950–present); Fluminense (1950–present); Vasco (1950–present; selected matches) (Note: Although Vasco has its own stadium, São Januário, it hosts the derbies against Flamengo and Fluminense at the Maracanã, due to a report from the Military Police that prohibits derbies in his home due to "security risks".); Other Rio de Janeiro clubs (selected matches); Brazil national football team (selected matches)

Estádio do Maracanã, (Note: Brazilian Portuguese pronunciation: [isˈtadʒ(i)u du maɾakɐˈnɐ̃]; lit. 'Maracanã Stadium', named after the Maracanã River.) officially known as Estádio Jornalista Mário Filho, (Note: Brazilian Portuguese pronunciation: [isˈtadʒ(i)u ʒoʁnaˈlistɐ ˈmaɾi.u ˈfiʎu]; lit. 'Journalist Mário Filho Stadium', named after Mário Filho.) is an association football stadium in Rio de Janeiro, Brazil. Located in the Maracanã neighborhood, it is owned by the Rio de Janeiro state government and managed by the clubs Flamengo and Fluminense. It is part of a complex that includes an arena known by the name of Maracanãzinho, which is mostly used for volleyball events.

The stadium was opened in 1950 to host the FIFA World Cup, in which Brazil was beaten 2–1 by Uruguay in the deciding game, in front of a still standing record attendance of 173,850 spectators, on 16 July 1950. The venue has seen attendances of 150,000 or more at 26 occasions and has seen crowds of more than 100,000 as many as 284 times. But as terraced sections have been replaced with seats over time, and after the renovation following the 2016 Summer Olympics and Paralympics, its original capacity has been reduced to the current 73,139, but it remains the largest stadium in Brazil and the third largest in South America after Estadio Monumental in Argentina and Estadio Monumental in Peru. Fluminense and Flamengo still own the all-time club record attendance, with 194,603 spectators supporting its clubs in the world famous Fla–Flu derby in 1963.

The stadium is mainly used for football matches between the major football clubs in Rio de Janeiro, including Botafogo, Flamengo, Fluminense, and Vasco da Gama. It has also hosted a number of concerts and other sporting events. It was the main venue for the 2007 Pan American Games, hosting the football tournament and the opening and closing ceremonies. The Maracanã was partially rebuilt in preparation for the 2013 FIFA Confederations Cup, and the 2014 World Cup, for which it hosted several matches, including the final. It is also set to host matches during the 2027 FIFA Women's World Cup. It served as the venue for the opening and closing ceremonies of the 2016 Summer Olympics and Paralympics, with the main track and field events taking place at the Estádio Olímpico. It hosted the Final for the 2019 and 2021 Copa America. The stadium was also chosen to host the 2020 and 2023 Copa Libertadores finals.

== Name ==
The stadium was named in 1966 in honor of the recently deceased Mário Filho, a Pernambucan sports journalist, the brother of Nelson Rodrigues, who was a strong vocal supporter of the construction of the Maracanã.

The stadium's popular name is derived from the Maracanã River, which originates in the jungle-covered hills to the west, crossing various bairros (neighborhoods) of Rio's Zona Norte (North Zone), such as Tijuca and São Cristóvão, via a drainage canal which features sloping sides constructed of concrete. Upon flowing into the Canal do Mangue, it empties into Guanabara Bay.

The name "Maracanã" derives from the indigenous Tupi word for a type of parrot which inhabited the region. The stadium construction was prior to the formation of the later Maracanã neighborhood, that was once part of Tijuca.

The stadium of Red Star Belgrade, the Red Star Stadium, is popularly called Marakana in honor of the Brazilian stadium.

In March 2021, the Rio de Janeiro state legislature voted to change the venue's name to the Edson Arantes do Nascimento - Rei Pele stadium. Edson Arantes do Nascimento was the 82-year-old's full name, while Rei means king in Portuguese. The Rio de Janeiro's state governor must approve the name change before it becomes official.

== History ==
=== Construction ===
After winning the right to host the 1950 FIFA World Cup, the Brazilian government sought to build a new stadium for the tournament. The construction of Maracanã was criticized by Carlos Lacerda, then Congressman and political enemy of the mayor of the city, general Ângelo Mendes de Morais, for the expense and for the chosen location of the stadium, arguing that it should be built in the West Zone neighborhood of Jacarepaguá. At the time, a tennis stadium stood in the chosen area. Still it was supported by journalist Mário Filho, and Mendes de Morais was able to move the project forward. The competition for the design and construction was opened by the municipality of Rio de Janeiro in 1947, with the construction contract awarded to engineer Humberto Menescal Michael Feldman, Waldir Ramos, Raphael Galvão, Oscar Valdetaro, Orlando Azevedo, Pedro Paulo Bernardes Bastos, and Antônio Dias Carneiro.

The first cornerstone was laid at the site of the stadium on 2 August 1948. With the first World Cup game scheduled to be played on 24 June 1950, this left a little under two years to finish construction. However, work quickly fell behind schedule, prompting FIFA to send Ottorino Barassi, the head of the Italian FA, who had organized the 1934 World Cup, to help in Rio de Janeiro. A workforce of 1,500 constructed the stadium, with an additional 2,000 working in the final months. Despite the stadium having come into use in 1950, the construction was only fully completed in 1965.

=== Opening and 1950 FIFA World Cup ===
Opening game of the Maracanã Stadium, shortly before the 1950 FIFA World Cup.

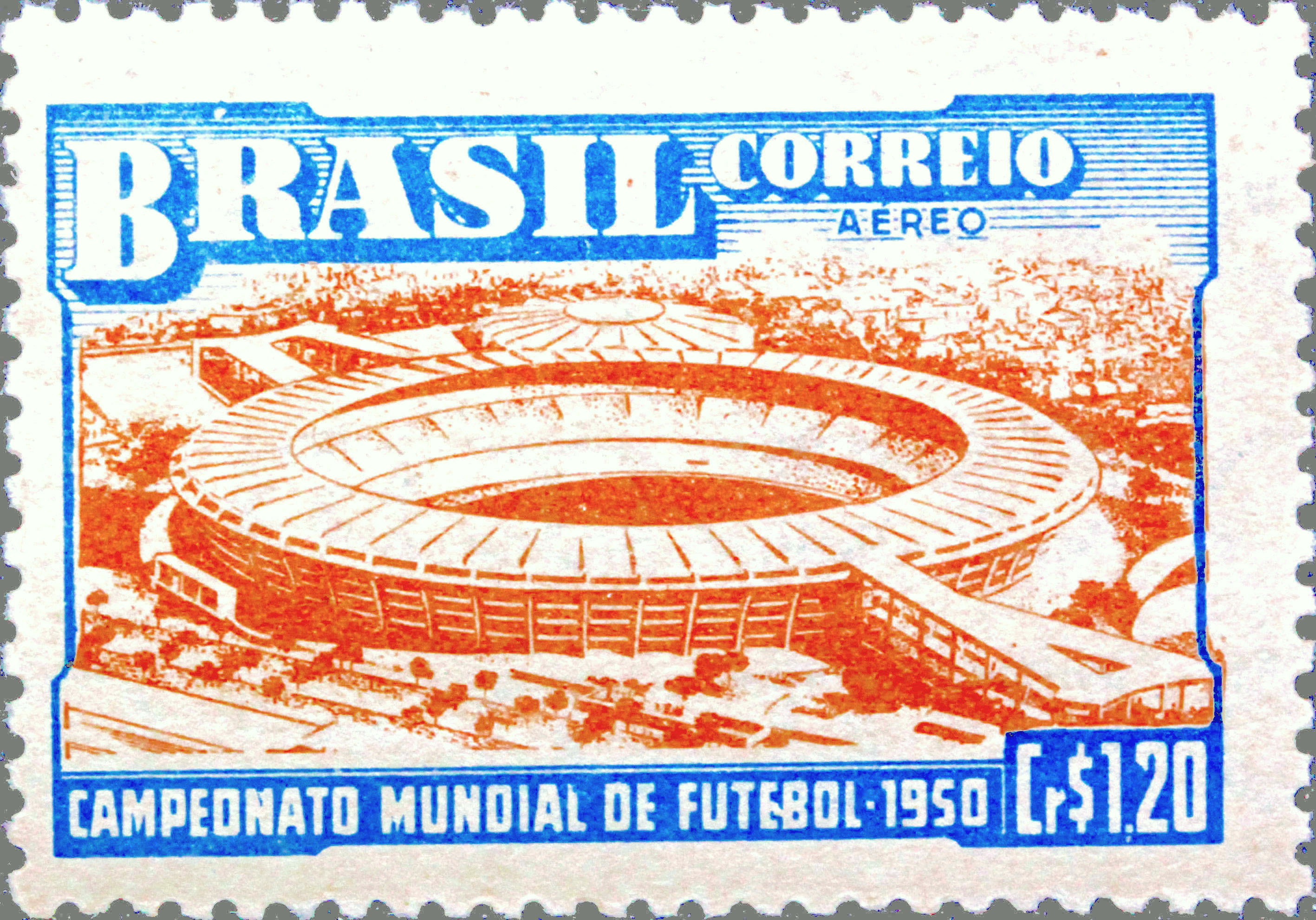
Postage stamp featuring the Maracanã, commemorating the 1950 FIFA World Cup.

The opening match of the stadium took place on 16 June 1950. Rio de Janeiro All-Stars beat São Paulo All-Stars 3–1; Didi became the player to score the first ever goal at the stadium. While the major part of the stadium was finished, it still looked like a construction site; it lacked toilet facilities and a press box. Brazilian officials claimed it could seat over 200,000 people, while the Guinness Book of World Records estimated it could seat 180,000 and other sources pegged capacity at 155,000. What is beyond dispute is that Maracanã overtook Hampden Park as the largest stadium in the world. Despite the stadium's unfinished state, FIFA allowed matches to be played at the venue, and on 24 June 1950, the first World Cup match took place, with 81,000 spectators in attendance.

In that first match for which Maracanã had been built, Brazil beat Mexico with a final score 4–0, with Ademir becoming the first scorer of a competitive goal at the stadium with his 30th-minute strike. Ademir had two goals in total, plus one each from Baltasar and Jair. The match was refereed by Englishman George Reader. Five of Brazil's six games at the tournament were played at Maracanã (the exception being their 2–2 draw with Switzerland in São Paulo). Eventually, Brazil progressed to the final round, facing Uruguay in the match (part of a round-robin final phase) that turned out to be the tournament-deciding match on 16 July 1950. Brazil only needed a draw to finish as champion, but Uruguay won the game 2–1, shocking and silencing the massive crowd. This defeat on home soil instantly became a significant event in Brazilian history, being known popularly as the Maracanazo (roughly translated as "The Maracanã Smash"). The official attendance of the final game was 199,854, with the actual attendance estimated to be about 210,000. In any case, it was the largest crowd ever to see a football game—a record that is highly unlikely to be threatened in an era when most international matches are played in all-seater stadiums. At the time of the World Cup, the stadium was mostly grandstands with no individual seats.

=== Stadium completion and post-World Cup years ===
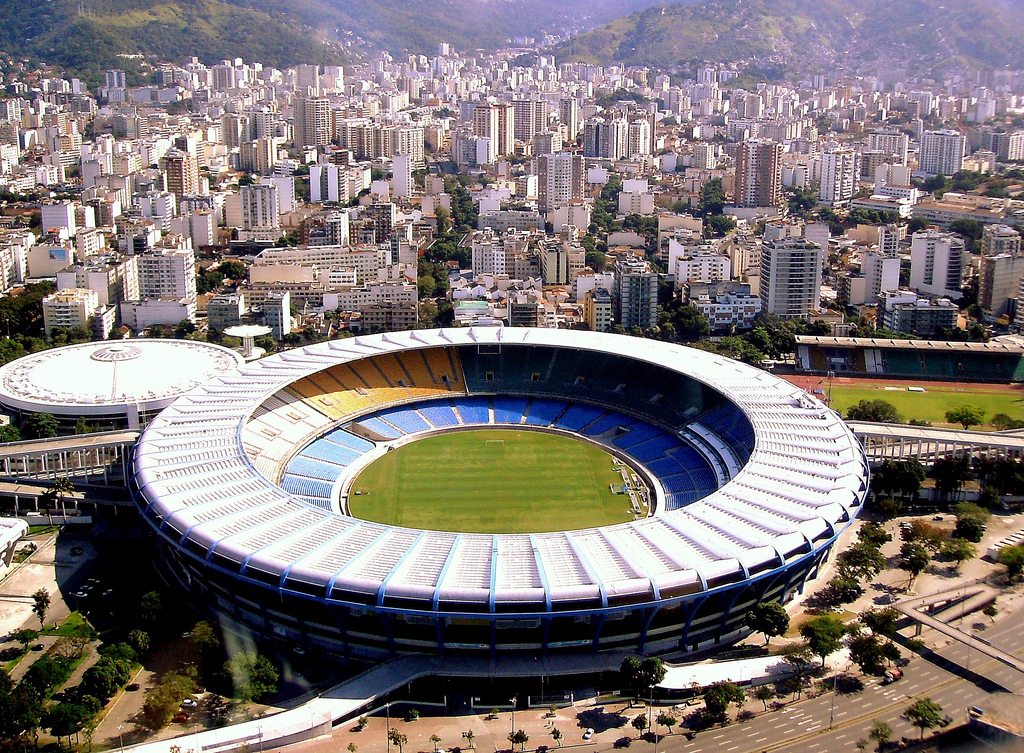
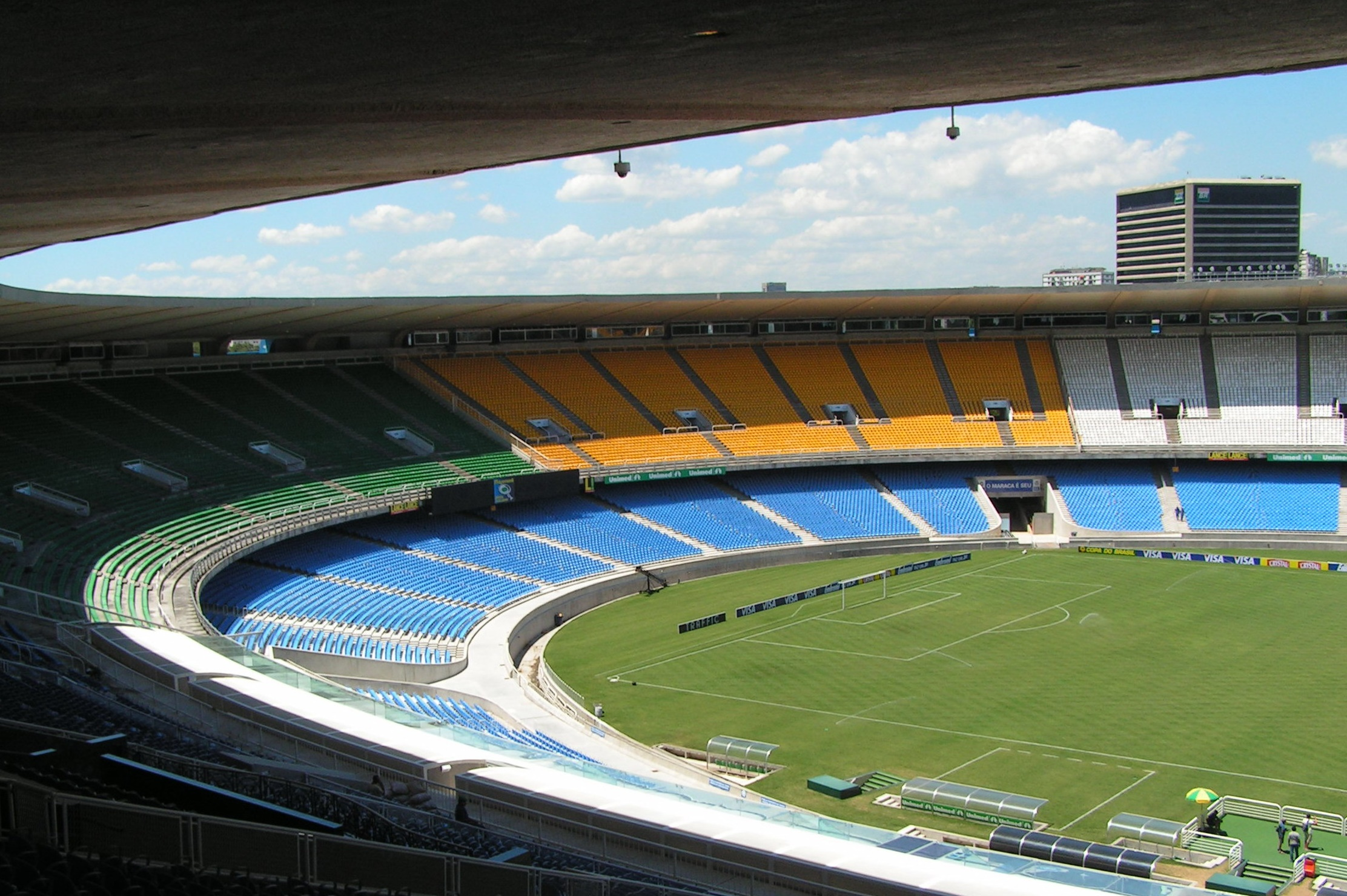
Original configuration of the Maracanã from 1950 to 2010, featuring a two-tier bowl and solid-color seating. (left: Exterior view, 2009. right: interior view looking towards the southern end, 2007.)

Since the World Cup in 1950, Maracanã Stadium has mainly been used for club games involving four major football clubs in Rio—Vasco, Botafogo, Flamengo and Fluminense. The stadium has also hosted numerous domestic football cup finals, most notably the Copa do Brasil and the Campeonato Carioca. On 21 March 1954, a new official attendance record was set in the game between Brazil and Paraguay, after 183,513 spectators entered the stadium with a ticket and 194,603 (177,656 p.) in Fla–Flu (1963). In 1963, stadium authorities replaced the square goal posts with round ones, but it was still two years before the stadium would be fully completed. In 1965, 17 years after construction began, the stadium was finally finished. In September 1966, upon the death of Mário Rodrigues Filho, the Brazilian journalist, columnist, sports figure, and prominent campaigner who was largely responsible for the stadium originally being built, the administrators of the stadium renamed the stadium after him: Estádio Jornalista Mário Rodrigues Filho. However, the nickname of Maracanã has continued to be used as the common referent. In 1969, Pelé scored the 1,000th goal of his career at Maracanã, against CR Vasco da Gama in front of 65,157 spectators.

In 1989, the stadium hosted the games of the final round of the Copa America; in the same year, Zico scored his final goal for Flamengo at the Maracanã, taking his goal tally at the stadium to 333, a record that still stood as of 2021. A railing in front of the stadium's upper tier collapsed on 19 July 1992, in the second game of the finals of 1992 Campeonato Brasileiro Série A, between Botafogo and Flamengo, leading to the death of three spectators and injuring 50 others. Following the disaster, the stadium's capacity was greatly reduced as it was converted to an all-seater stadium in the late 1990s. Meanwhile, the ground was classified as a national landmark in 1998, meaning that it could not be demolished. The stadium hosted the first ever FIFA Club World Cup final match between CR Vasco da Gama and Corinthians, which Corinthians won on penalties.

=== 21st century, renovations and 2014 FIFA World Cup ===
Following its 50th anniversary in 2000, the stadium underwent renovations which would increase its full capacity to around 103,000. After years of planning and nine months of closure between 2005 and 2006, the stadium was reopened in January 2007 with an all-seated capacity of 87,000.

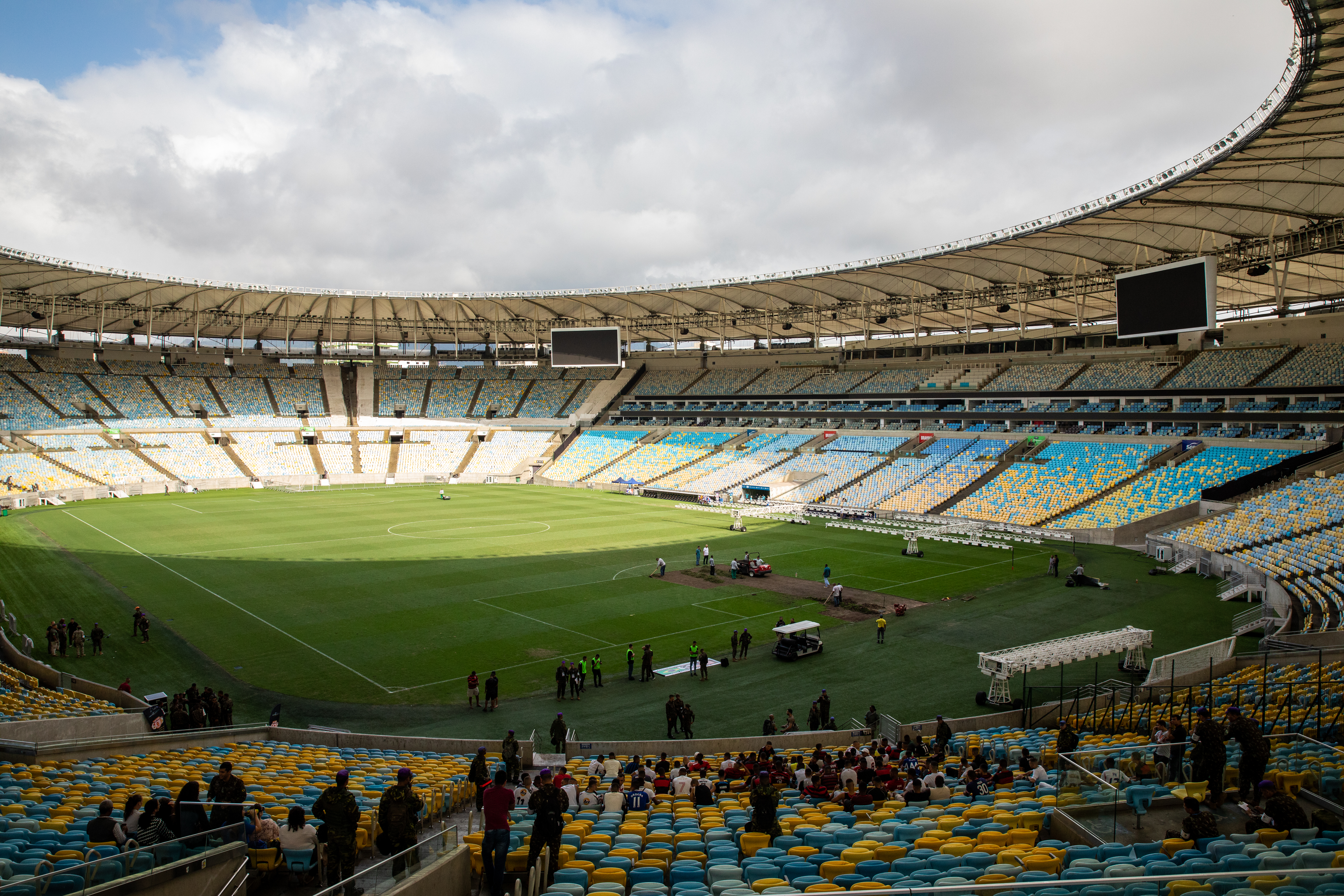
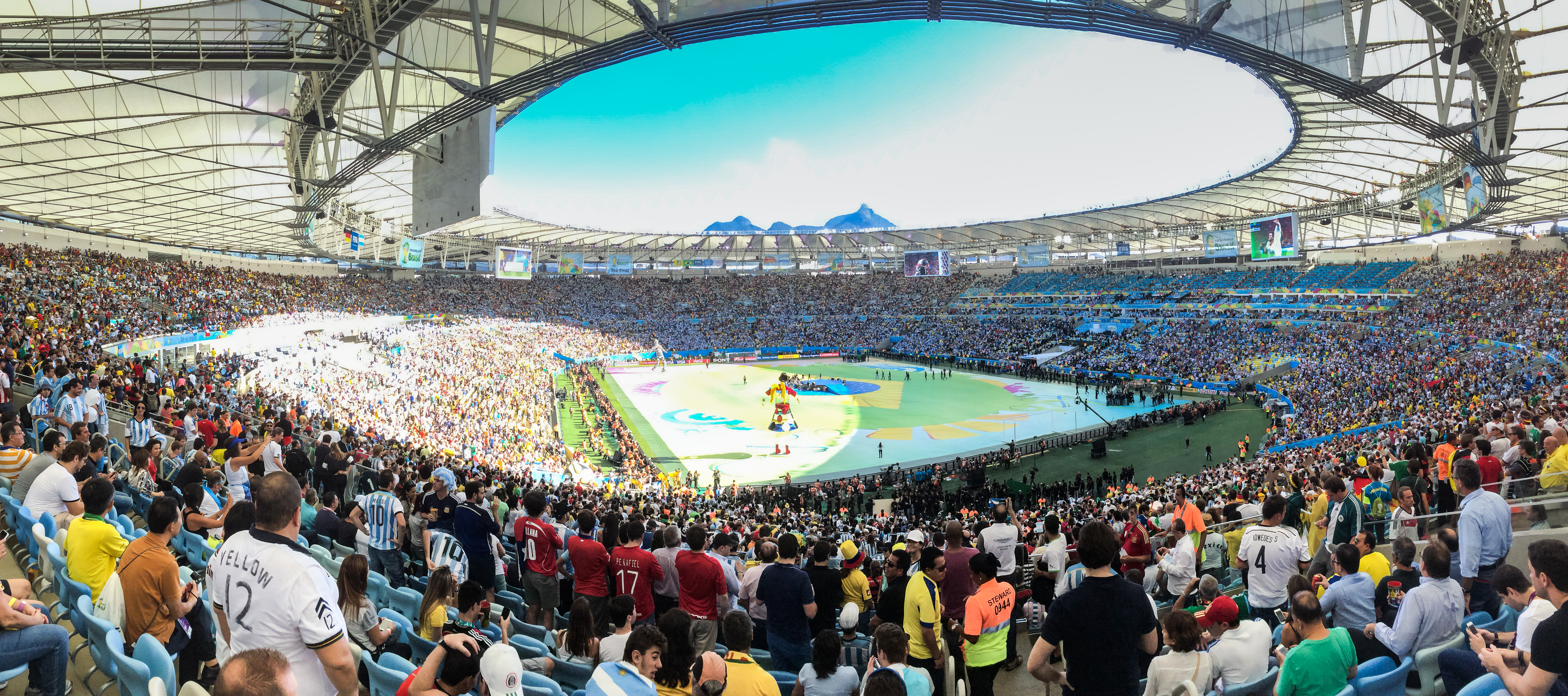
Layout following the 2010s reconstruction of the Maracanã. Used for landmark events, pictured below depicts the closing ceremony of the 2014 FIFA World Cup.

For the 2014 World Cup and 2016 Olympics and Paralympics, a major reconstruction project was initiated in 2010. The original seating bowl, with a two-tier configuration, was demolished, giving way to a new primarily one-tier seating bowl with a space for 78,639 spectators. The old boxes, which were installed at a level above the stands for the 2000 FIFA Club World Championship, were dismantled in the process. The new seats are colored yellow, blue and white, which combined with the green of the playing field form the Brazilian national colors. In addition, the grayish tone has returned as the main façade color of the stadium. The original stadium's roof in concrete was removed and replaced with a fiberglass tensioned membrane coated with polytetra-fluoroethylene. The new roof covers 95% of the seats inside the stadium, unlike the former design, where protection was only afforded to some seats in the upper ring and the bleachers above the gate access of each sector.

On 30 May 2013, a friendly game between Brazil and England scheduled for 2 June was called off by a local judge because of safety concerns related to the stadium. The government of Rio de Janeiro appealed the decision and the game went ahead as originally planned, ended in a 2–2 draw. This match marked the reopening of the new Maracanã.

In April 2013, the Rio de Janeiro state government began evaluating bids to administer the stadium for a 35-year-long concession. Two companies bid – one a combination of Odebrecht, AEG and IMX, a company owned by Brazilian billionaire Eike Batista, and the other Brazilian building company OAS together with French Lagardère Group and Johan Cruyff Arena managing company. The Odebrecht led group were awarded the contract.

On 12 June 2014, the 2014 FIFA World Cup opened with host nation Brazil defeating Croatia 3–1, but that match was held at Arena Corinthians in São Paulo. The first game of the World Cup to be held in Maracanã was a 2–1 victory by Argentina over Bosnia and Herzegovina on 15 June 2014, being the only stadium for the tournament used previously in 1950. Brazil would have played at the Maracanã if they reached the final, but instead they lost 7–1 to Germany in the semi-finals.

=== Disrepair after the 2016 Summer Olympics precipitates new concessionaire ===
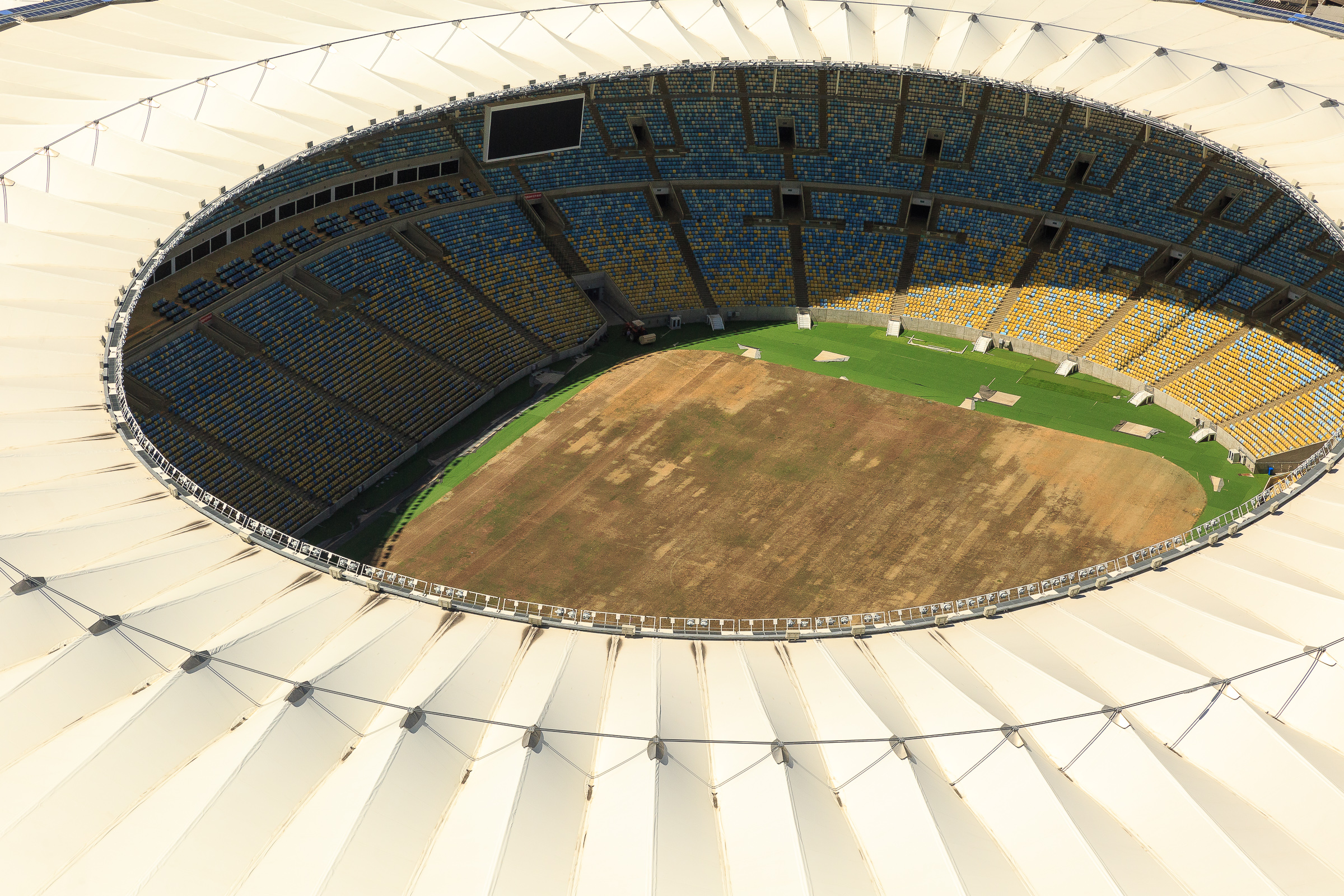
Aerial photograph of Maracanã's playing field in February 2017

The stadium lay dormant in the months after the 2016 Olympics and Paralympics, with photos surfacing in early 2017 of a dried-up playing field covered in brown spots and missing turf, ripped-out seats, and damage to windows and doors. A debt of R$3 million (US$939,937) to the local energy company led to power being shut off at Maracanã. At the heart of the issue was a legal wrangling between the stadium's owner, operator, and the organizing committee for the Rio Olympics over responsibility for maintaining the grounds. Maracanã SA, the operator, charges that the Olympic committee did not return the venue in an acceptable condition, while the committee says the things that they needed to fix should not keep Maracanã from operating.

Within six months of the Olympics, daily tours of the stadium were halted due to vandalism at the stadium and violent robberies in the area. Items of value were looted from the stadium including fire extinguishers, televisions, and a bronze bust of journalist Mário Filho, for whom the stadium was named.

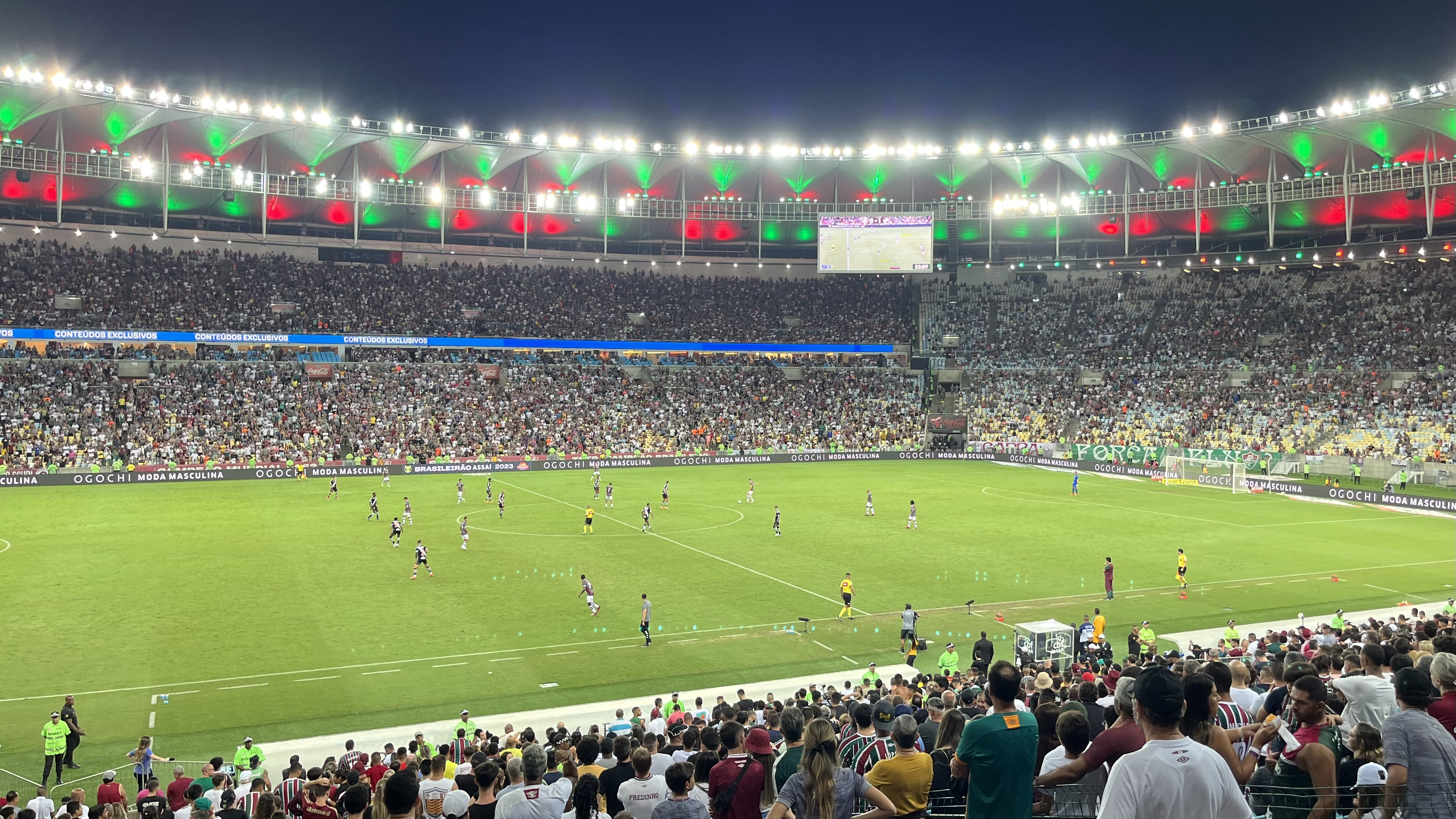
The Maracanã Stadium during a Clássico dos Gigantes between Fluminense and Vasco da Gama in May 2023

On 5 April 2017, the French group Lagardère signed an agreement to take over administration of the Maracanã. In total, Lagardère will invest more than R$500 million by the end of the concession, which they originally lost to Odebrecht in 2013 and which will be valid until 2048. The Folha de São Paulo newspaper informed that the group estimates that it will need to spend about R$15 million on emergency repairs to the stadium.

== Non-football events ==
Game between Ravens and Cowboys at Maracanã, part of the NFL International Series, in September 2026.

The famous vale tudo match between Japanese judoka Masahiko Kimura and Brazilian jiu-jitsu player Hélio Gracie was held at the Maracanã on 23 October 1951. At the time many in Brazil felt that Gracie was unbeatable in martial arts, and that Kimura would not be welcomed back to Japan if he lost the bout. Kimura won via technical submission after breaking Gracie's arm with a gyaku-ude-garami hold, which has since become known as a Kimura lock in BJJ and mixed martial arts. On September 27, 2026 the Baltimore Ravens defeated the Dallas Cowboys 34-31 In the third ever NFL game in Brazil and the first NFL game in Brazil not played in Arena Corinthians (Neo Química Arena).

=== International sports competitions ===
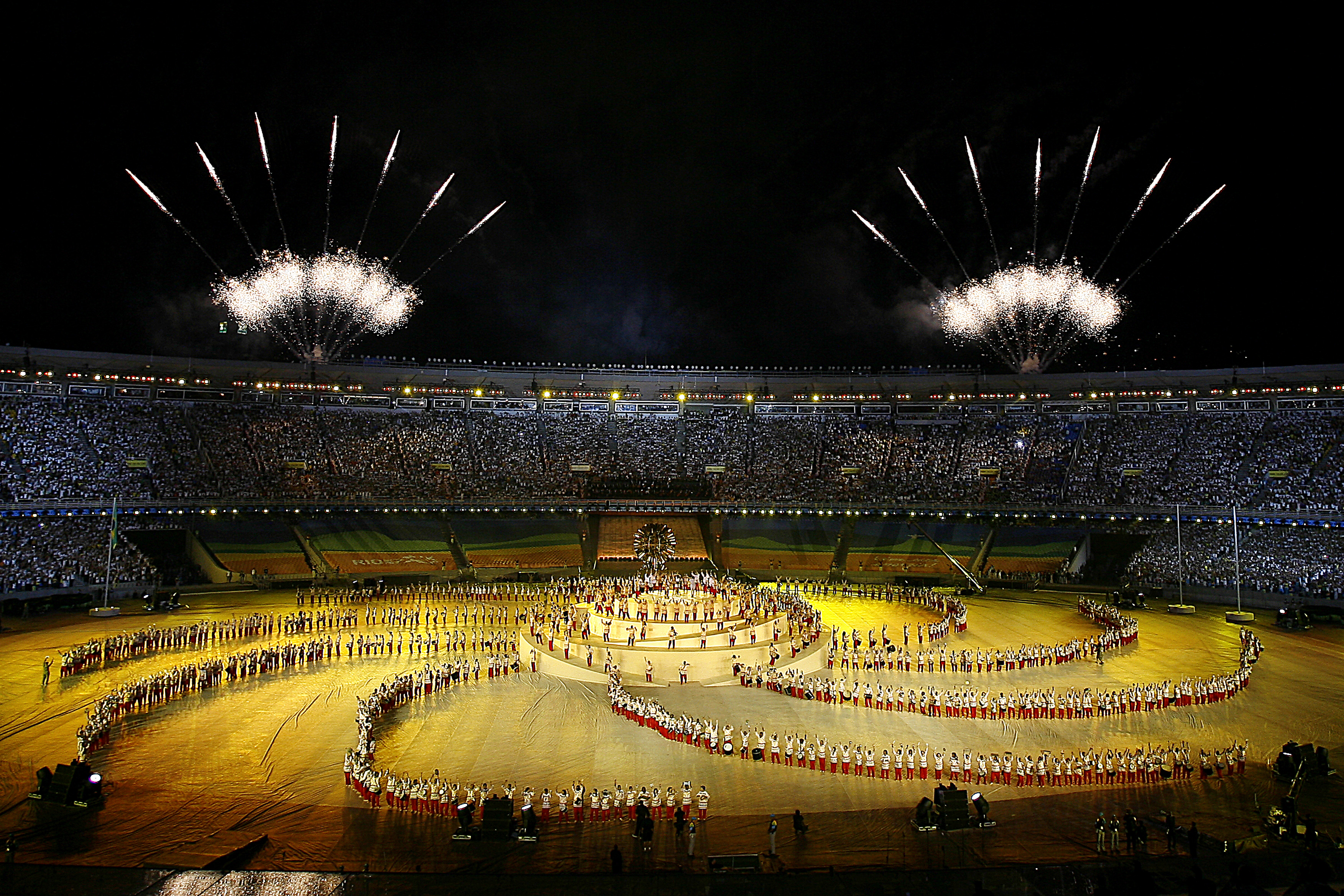
A scene from the opening ceremony of the 2007 Pan American Games

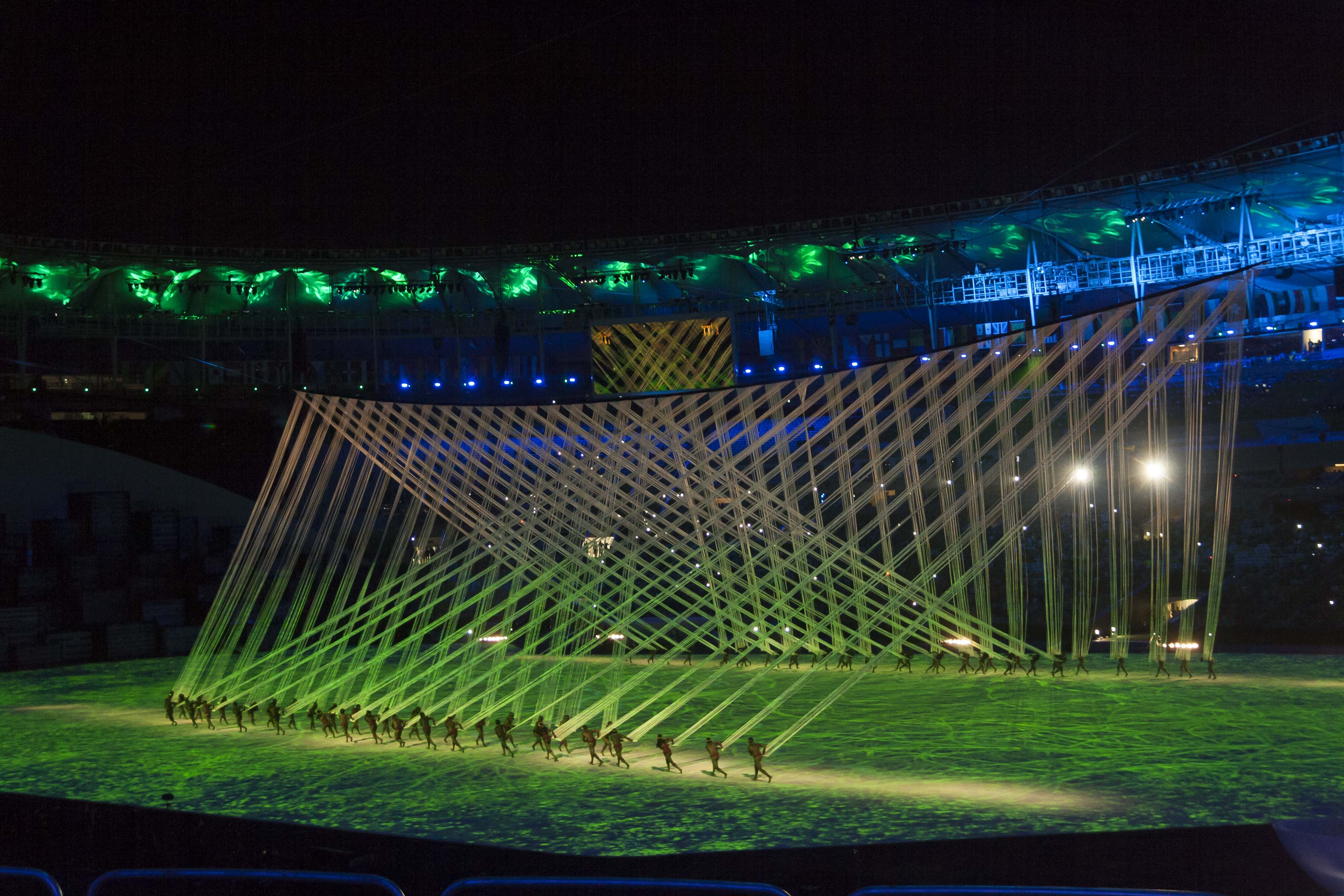
The "Pindorama" segment during the 2016 Summer Olympics opening ceremony

- In 1980 and 1983, volleyball matches between Brazil and the USSR played at the ground. 95,000 people attended one of those volleyball matches, which became a world record.
- The stadium hosted the opening and closing ceremonies of the 2007 Pan American Games.
- The stadium hosted the opening and closing ceremonies of the 2016 Summer Olympics and Paralympics, as well as the semi-finals and gold medal matches of the Olympic football tournaments. It was the first ceremonies venue at the Summer Olympics to not also be the athletics venue.

=== Music ===
- To celebrate the 30th anniversary of the stadium, on 16 January 1980, Frank Sinatra performed to a crowd of 175,000.
- On 18 June 1983, Kiss performed for 137,000 fans at the stadium, which marks the record attendance for the band. This and two other stadium shows in Brazil would be the last time Kiss would perform in their signature makeup until the reunion of the original lineup at their Alive/Worldwide Tour in 1996. Kiss' concert was the first major performance by an international rock band at Maracanã.
- Tina Turner and Paul McCartney made the Guinness Book of World Records with performances at the stadium. Both concerts, in January 1988 (Break Every Rule Tour) and April 1990 (The Paul McCartney World Tour), respectively, attracted crowds of over 180,000 people.
- From 18 to 27 January 1991, the stadium hosted the second edition of Rock in Rio, with Prince, Guns N' Roses, George Michael, INXS, New Kids on the Block and a-ha as headliners.
- American pop-singer Michael Jackson planned to perform here in October 1993 as part of his Dangerous World Tour, but the concert was cancelled due to tour restructuring.
- Sting, Madonna, the Rolling Stones, the Foo Fighters and Paul McCartney are the only international pop stars to have played dates at Maracanã on different occasions. Sting opened his ...Nothing Like the Sun world tour at the stadium on 20 November 1987. Approximately 20 years later, on 8 December 2007, he performed there again with the Police. Madonna played the venue on 6 November 1993, with the Girlie Show in front of 120,000 people, and then again 15 years later on 14 and 15 December 2008, as part of the Sticky & Sweet Tour, selling over 107,000 tickets. The 1995 edition of the Hollywood Rock festival consisted of two concerts by the Rolling Stones at the stadium, in February. The band performed at Maracanã again on 20 February 2016. On 25 January 2015, Foo Fighters played a concert at Maracanã Stadium during their Sonic Highways World Tour in front of 45,000 people. It was the first music concert held at the stadium since it was rebuilt. The group performed at the stadium again on 25 February 2018, during their Concrete and Gold Tour. Paul McCartney played two shows on 20 and 21 April 1990, as part of The Paul McCartney World Tour. Thirty-three years later, McCartney returned to play a show on 16 December 2023, as part of the Got Back tour.
- Rush, Backstreet Boys, Pearl Jam, Coldplay, Phil Collins and Roger Waters also played the venue. Rush's concert in 2002 is documented on their live album and DVD Rush in Rio. Mexican pop group RBD also played its live DVD, Live in Rio. Brazilian artists have also played at the stadium, such as Ivete Sangalo, Sandy & Junior, Diante do Trono, Roberto Carlos and Los Hermanos.

=== Miscellaneous ===
- Pope John Paul II celebrated Masses at the stadium in 1980, 1987 and 1997.
- Billy Graham preached there in 1960 and in 1974 broke the record for attendance on a single day with 225,000.

== Tournament results ==
=== 1950 FIFA World Cup ===
Date	Time (UTC-03)	Team #1	Result	Team #2	Round	Attendance
24 June 1950	15:00	Brazil	4–0	Mexico	Group 1	82,000
25 June 1950	15:00	England	2–0	Chile	Group 2	30,000
29 June 1950	15:00	Spain	2–0	Chile	Group 2	16,000
1 July 1950	15:00	Brazil	2–0	Yugoslavia	Group 1	142,000
2 July 1950	15:00	Spain	1–0	England	Group 2	75,000
9 July 1950	15:00	Brazil	7–1	Sweden	Final round	139,000
13 July 1950	15:00	Brazil	6–1	Spain	Final round	153,000
16 July 1950	15:00	Uruguay	2–1	Brazil	Final round	173,850

=== 1989 Copa América ===
Date	Time (UTC-03)	Team #1	Result	Team #2	Round	Attendance
12 July 1989		Uruguay	3–0	Paraguay	Final round	100,135
12 July 1989		Brazil	2–0	Argentina	Final round	100,135
14 July 1989		Uruguay	2–0	Argentina	Final round	53,909
14 July 1989		Brazil	3–0	Paraguay	Final round	53,909
16 July 1989		Argentina	0–0	Paraguay	Final round	148,068
16 July 1989		Brazil	1–0	Uruguay	Final round	148,068

=== 2013 FIFA Confederations Cup ===
Date	Time (UTC-03)	Team #1	Result	Team #2	Round	Attendance
16 June 2013	16:00	Mexico	1–2	Italy	Group A	73,123
20 June 2013	16:00	Spain	10–0	Tahiti	Group B	71,806
30 June 2013	19:00	Brazil	3–0	Spain	Final	73,531

=== 2014 FIFA World Cup ===
Date	Time (UTC-03)	Team #1	Result	Team #2	Round	Attendance
15 June 2014	19:00	Argentina	2–1	Bosnia and Herzegovina	Group F	74,393
18 June 2014	16:00	Spain	0–2	Chile	Group B	74,101
22 June 2014	13:00	Belgium	1–0	Russia	Group H	73,819
25 June 2014	17:00	Ecuador	0–0	France	Group E	73,750
28 June 2014	17:00	Colombia	2–0	Uruguay	Round of 16	73,804
4 July 2014	13:00	France	0–1	Germany	Quarter-finals	73,965
13 July 2014	16:00	Germany	1–0 (a.e.t.)	Argentina	Final	74,738

=== 2016 Summer Olympics ===
Date	Time (UTC-03)	Team #1	Result	Team #2	Round	Attendance
16 August 2016	13:00	Brazil	0–0 (a.e.t.) (3–4 pen.)	Sweden	Women's semi-finals	70,454
17 August 2016	13:00	Brazil	6–0	Honduras	Men's semi-finals	52,457
19 August 2016	17:30	Sweden	1–2	Germany	Women's gold medal match	52,432
20 August 2016	17:30	Brazil	1–1 (a.e.t.) (5–4 pen.)	Germany	Men's gold medal match	63,707

=== 2019 Copa América ===
Date	Time (UTC-03)	Team #1	Result	Team #2	Round	Attendance
16 June 2019	16:00	Paraguay	2–2	Qatar	Group B	19,196
18 June 2019	18:30	Bolivia	1–3	Peru	Group A	26,346
24 June 2019	20:00	Chile	0–1	Uruguay	Group C	57,442
28 June 2019	16:00	Venezuela	0–2	Argentina	Quarter-finals	50,094
7 July 2019	17:00	Brazil	3–1	Peru	Final	69,968

=== 2021 Copa América ===
On 10 July 2021, the stadium hosted the final of the 2021 Copa América, for the second consecutive time.

Date	Time (UTC-03)	Team #1	Result	Team #2	Round	Attendance
10 July 2021	21:00	Argentina	1–0	Brazil	Final	7,800

=== 2027 FIFA Women's World Cup ===
Date	Time (UTC-03)	Team #1	Result	Team #2	Round	Attendance
24 June 2027	--:--	Brazil	v	A2	Group A	
27 June 2027	--:--	D3	v	D4	Group D	
1 July 2027	--:--	C1	v	C3	Group C	
3 July 2027	--:--	G4	v	G2	Group G	
5 July 2027	--:--	B4	v	B1	Group B	
7 July 2027	--:--	F4	v	F1	Group F	
16 July 2027	--:--	Winner Match 53	v	Winner Match 54	Quarter-finals	
21 July 2027	--:--	Winner Match 59	v	Winner Match 60	Semi-finals	
25 July 2027	--:--	Winner Match 61	v	Winner Match 62	Final	

== See also ==
- All-seater stadium
- List of stadiums by capacity
- List of football (soccer) stadiums by capacity
- Seating assignment
- Lists of stadiums

== Notes ==
Events and tenants
Preceded by Parc des Princes; Paris	FIFA World Cup; Opening venue 1950	Succeeded by 4 venues (Wankdorf Stadium, Charmilles Stadium; Hardturm, Stade olympique de la Pontaise) used for the 1954 FIFA World Cup, matches on the first day were all played at the same time
Preceded by Stade Olympique de Colombes; Paris	FIFA World Cup; Final venue (This match was the tournament-deciding game of a round-robin phase); 1950	Succeeded by Wankdorf Stadium; Bern
Preceded by Estadio Monumental Antonio Vespucio Liberti; Buenos Aires	Copa América; Final round matches 1989	Succeeded by Estadio Nacional de Chile; Santiago
Preceded by first stadium	FIFA Club World Championship; Final venue 2000	Succeeded by International Stadium Yokohama; Yokohama
Preceded by Estadio Olímpico Juan Pablo Duarte; Santo Domingo	Pan American Games; Opening and closing ceremonies venue 2007	Succeeded by Estadio Omnilife; Guadalajara
Preceded by Ellis Park Stadium; Johannesburg	FIFA Confederations Cup; Final venue 2013	Succeeded by Krestovsky Stadium; Saint Petersburg
Preceded by Soccer City; Johannesburg	FIFA World Cup; Final venue 2014	Succeeded by Luzhniki Stadium; Moscow
Preceded by Olympic Stadium; London	Summer Olympics; Opening and closing ceremonies venue (Olympic Stadium); 2016	Succeeded by Japan National Stadium; Tokyo
Preceded by Wembley Stadium; London	Summer Olympics; Men's football gold medal match venue 2016	Succeeded by International Stadium Yokohama; Yokohama
Preceded by Wembley Stadium; London	Summer Olympics; Women's football gold medal match venue 2016	Succeeded by Japan National Stadium; Tokyo
Preceded by Olympic Stadium; London	Summer Paralympics; Opening and closing ceremonies venue 2016	Succeeded by Japan National Stadium; Tokyo
Preceded by MetLife Stadium; East Rutherford	Copa América; Final venue 2019, 2021	Succeeded by Hard Rock Stadium; Miami
Preceded by Stadium Australia; Sydney	FIFA Women's World Cup; Final venue 2027	Succeeded by TBD; TBD
