= Duque de Caxias, Rio de Janeiro =

Municipality in Rio de Janeiro's metropolitan area

Duque de Caxias
- Municipality
- Municipality of Duque de Caxias
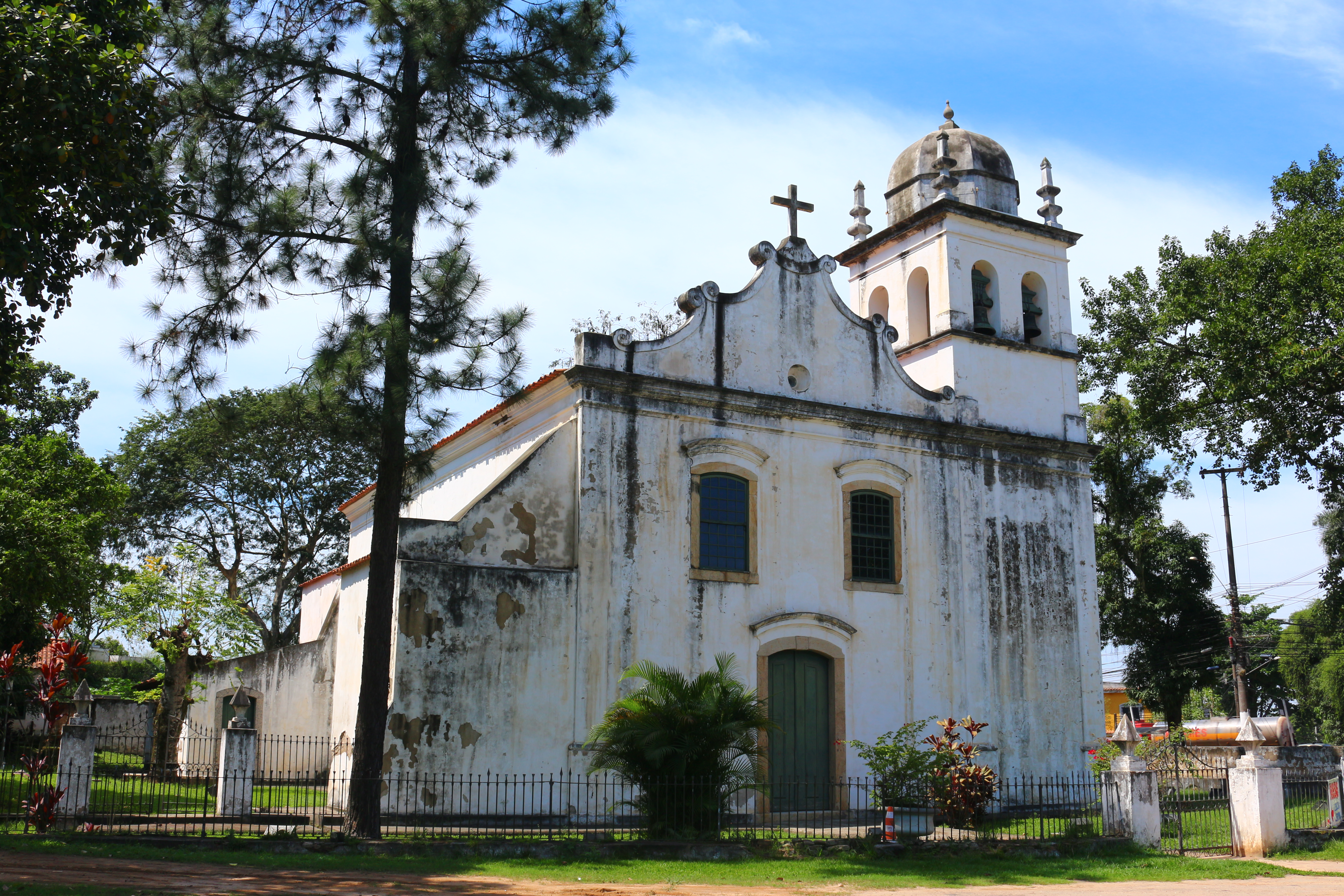
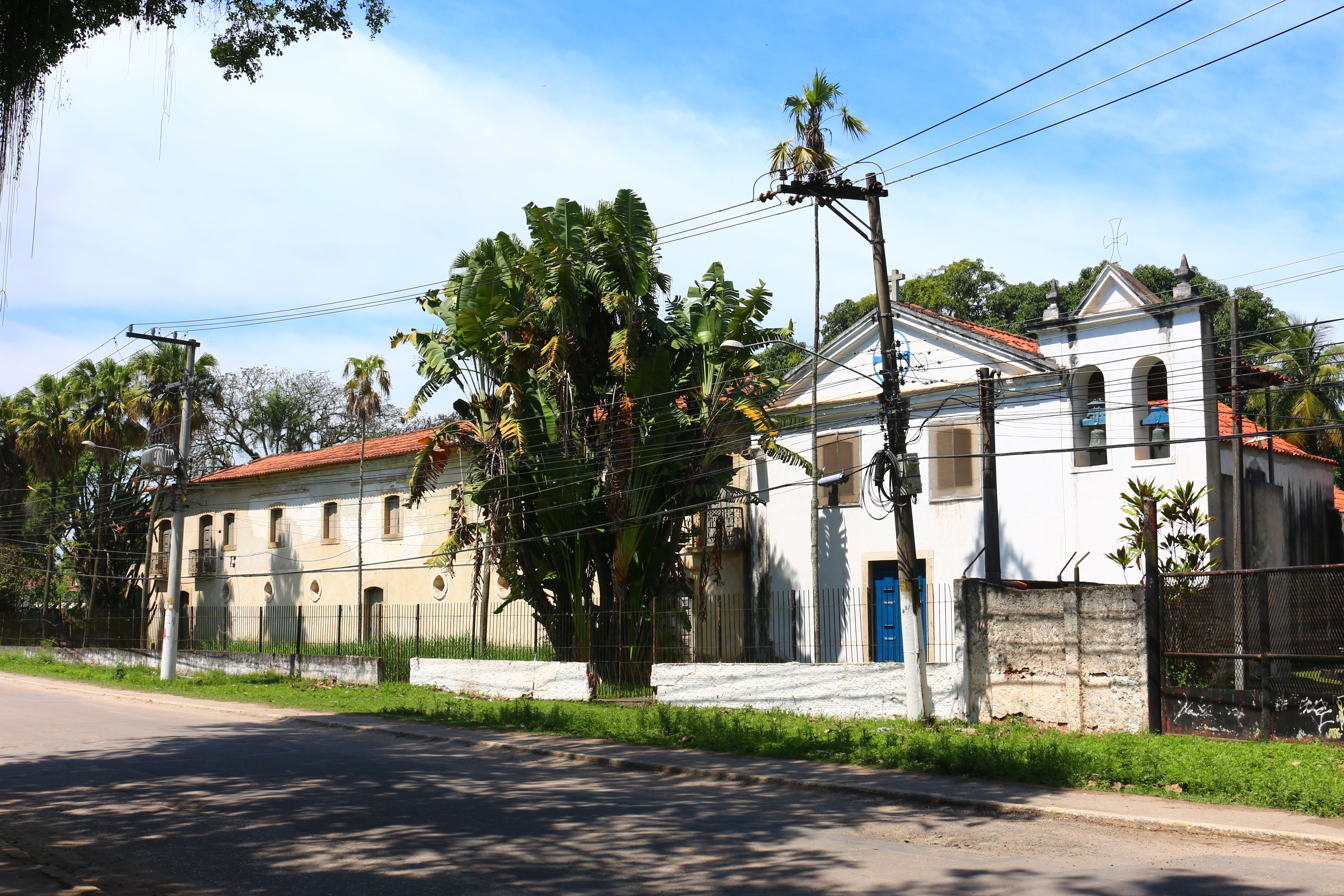
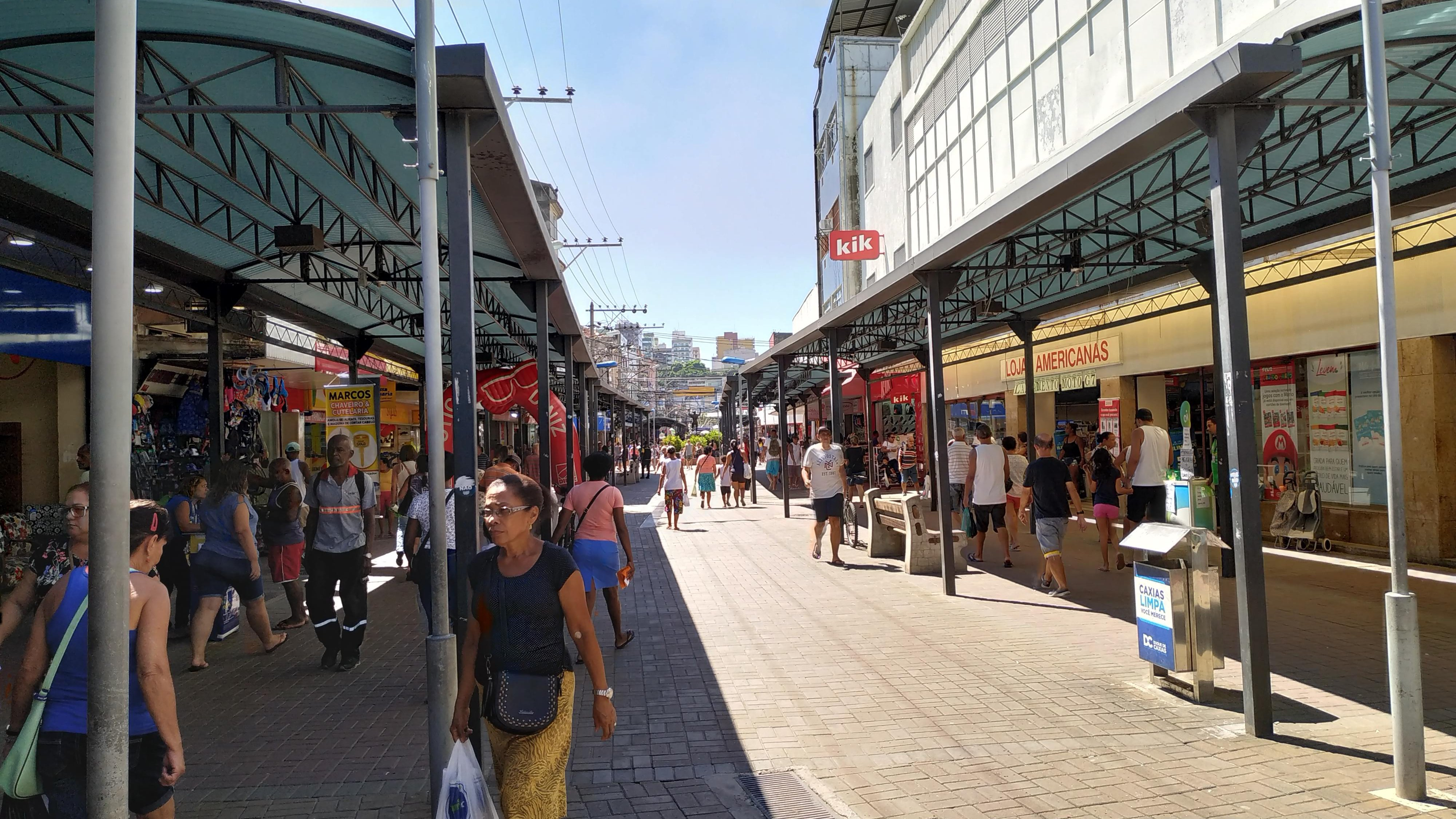

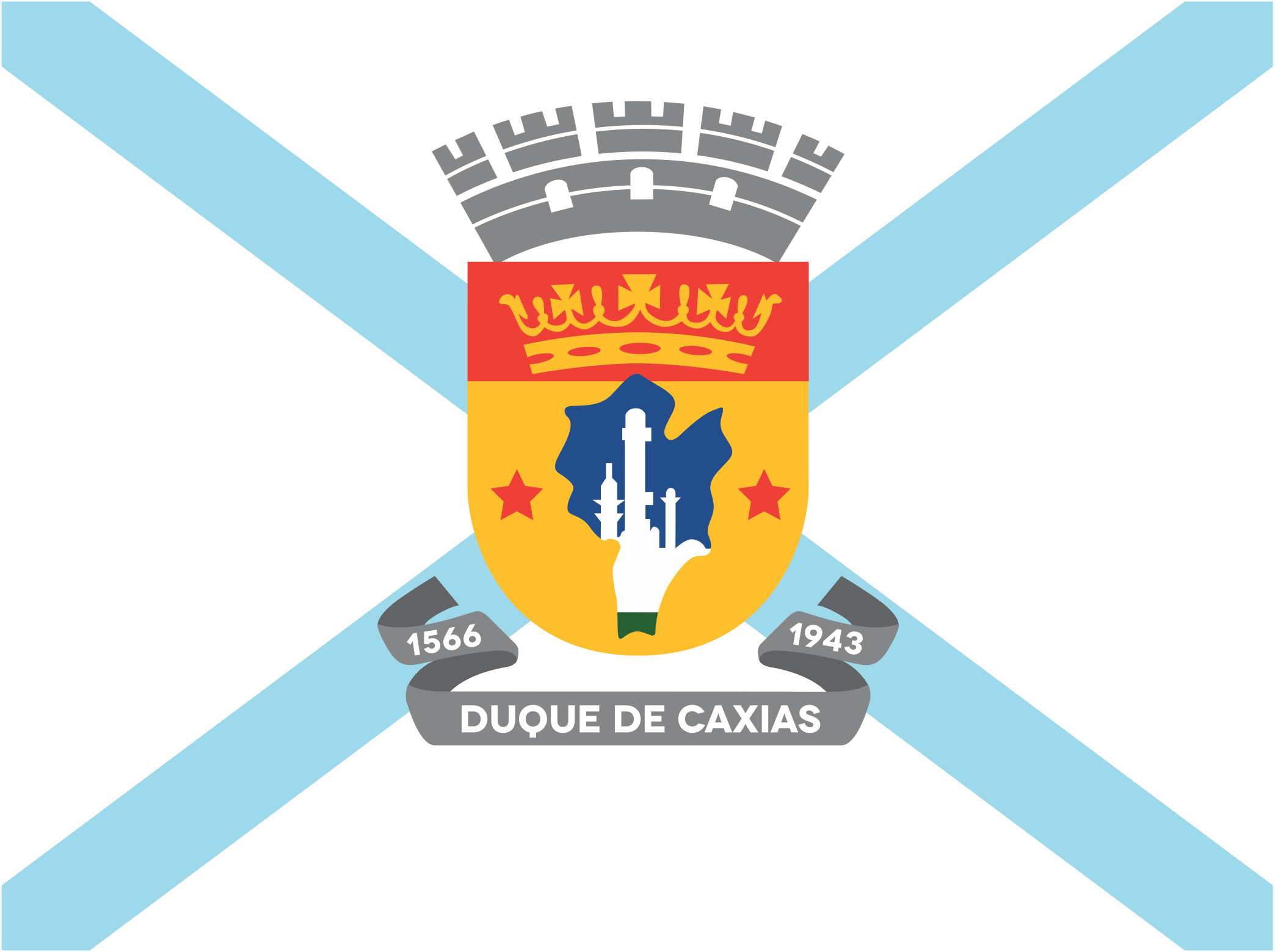
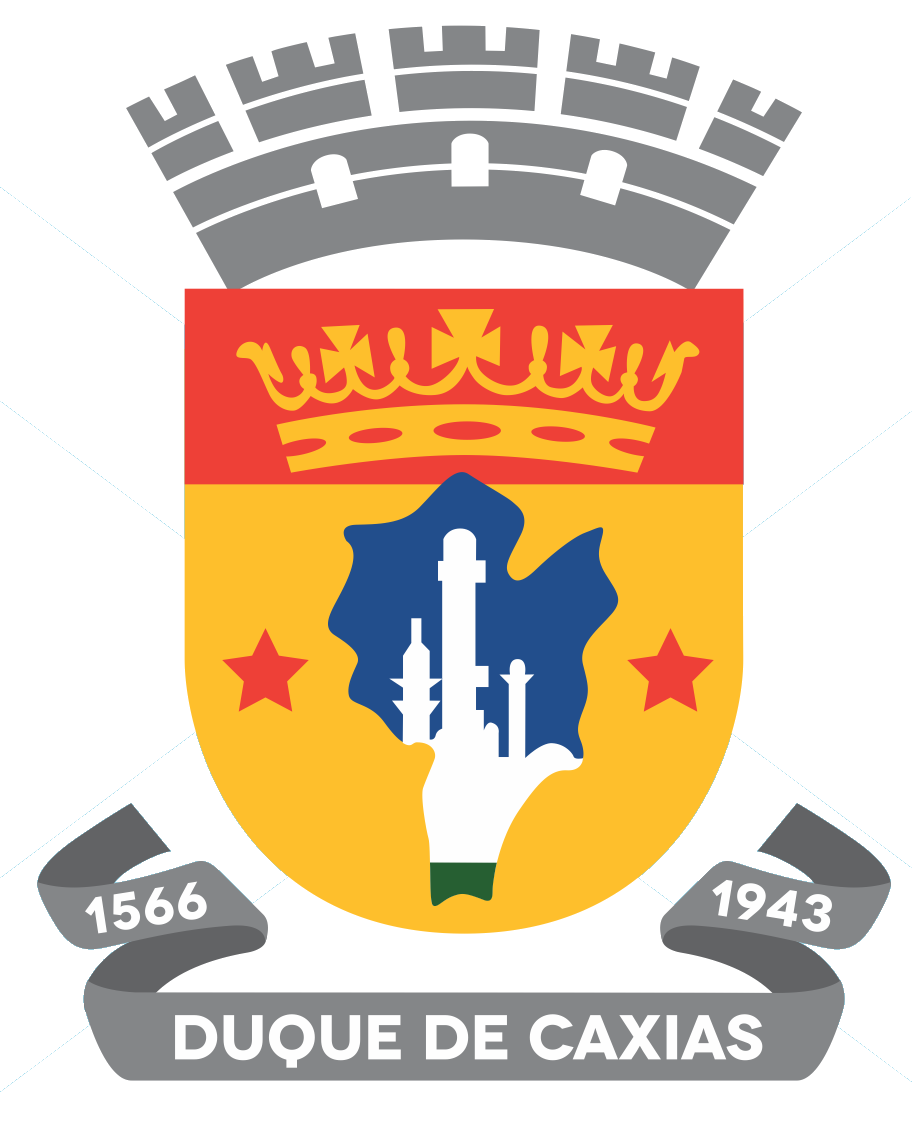
- Flag Coat of arms

- Location of Duque de Caxias in the State of Rio de Janeiro
- Coordinates: 22°47′09″S 43°18′43″W
- Country: Brazil
- Region: Southeast
- State: Rio de Janeiro
- Founded: 31 December 1943

Government
  - Mayor: Netinho Reis (2025–2028)

Area
  - Total: 464.573 km^{2} (179.373 sq mi)
- Elevation: 7 m (23 ft)

Population (2024)
  - Total: 866,347
  - Rank: 22nd
  - Density: 1,860.61/km^{2} (4,819.0/sq mi)
- Demonym: Caxiense
- Time zone: UTC−3 (BRT)
- Postal Code: 25000-000
- Area code: +55 21
- Website: Duque de Caxias

Duque de Caxias (Brazilian Portuguese pronunciation: [ˈduki dʒi kaˈʃi.ɐs]; "Duke of Caxias") is a city on Guanabara Bay and part of Rio de Janeiro metropolitan area, southeastern Brazil.

It is bordered by Rio de Janeiro city to the south. Its population was 866,347 (2024) and its area is 465 km^{2}, making it the second most populous suburb of Rio de Janeiro city. The city is the third most populous in Rio de Janeiro Metropolitan Area, and also the third most populous city in Rio de Janeiro state. The current mayor is Netinho Reis.

It is named after Luís Alves de Lima e Silva, Duke of Caxias, who was born there in 1803. The city is the seat of the Roman Catholic Diocese of Duque de Caxias. Its important industries are chemicals and oil refining.

It became a municipality in 1943, following its separation from the city of Nova Iguaçu.

Duque de Caxias Futebol Clube is the local football team of the city. The club plays their home matches at Estádio Romário de Souza Faria, which has a maximum capacity of 10,000 people. Estádio De Los Larios, located in the district of Xerém, has a maximum capacity of 11,000 people and it is the home ground of Esporte Clube Tigres do Brasil.

== History ==
=== Monarchy ===
The settlement of the region dates back to the 16th century, to the establishment of the Captaincy of São Vicente. In 1568, Brás Cubas, provider of the captaincies of São Vicente and Santo Amaro, received, in donation of sesmaria, 3,000 fathoms of tested land to the sea and 9,000 fathoms of bottom lands to the Meriti River, cutting the paving stone of the village of Jacutinga. Another of the recipients was Cristóvão Monteiro, who gained lands on the banks of the Iguaçu River. The economic activity that gave rise to the occupation of the place was the cultivation of sugarcane. Corn, beans and rice have also become important ancillary products during this period.

In the seventeenth and eighteenth centuries, the administrative division of Iguaçu followed ecclesiastical criteria, that is, the church assumed religious and legal administration over the parishes. Thus, Pilar, Meriti, Estrela and Jacutinga, areas that currently occupy part of the territory of Duque de Caxias, belonged to Iguaçu. The region became an important point of passage for riches from the interior: the gold of Minas Gerais, discovered at the time of crisis of the sugar plantation and the coffee of the Paraíba Valley, which represented about 70% of the entire Brazilian economy at the time.

Since the roads on the mainland were few, precarious and dangerous, transportation was mostly done by river. The rivers were not lacking in the region and, due to its location at the Bay of Guanabara, many paths up the mountains towards the interior went through today's Duque de Caxias. The Port of Estrela was the most important landmark of this period. Around it grew a camp that, in the 19th century, was transformed into the municipality of Vila da Estrela.

After the decay of mining, the region remained a rest stop, supplying troopers, transshipment and transit of goods. Until the 19th century, local progress was remarkable. However, the relentless deforestation caused the obstruction and overflowing of the rivers, which favored the formation of marshland. The still and polluted waters led to the spread of disease-carrying mosquitoes.

The location was rendered practically uninhabitable, and little remained of the population. The previously fertile lands were covered with mangrove vegetation. In 1850, epidemics arose, forcing senhores de engenho to flee to safer places. Many properties were abandoned, and Duque de Caxias would remain in shambles for some decades.

With the introduction of rail transport, the situation has deteriorated considerably. The D. Pedro II Railway linked the capital of the Brazilian Empire to the current municipality of Queimados. The production of the Paraíba Valley began to be disposed of by this route, rivers and land transportation were gradually abandoned and the river ports lost their importance. The region of Equatorial Guinea fell into sharp decline.

With the abolition of slavery in 1888, several changes occurred in the economic and social life of the Baixada Fluminense. The sanitation works were abandoned, there was a delay in the conditions conducive to health and several diseases arose. Among them, Malaria and Chagas disease.

=== Republic ===
Under the government of Nilo Peçanha, Meriti had a timid improvement in the area of basic sanitation, counting, even, with the arrival of the piped water, in 1916, in the present land of the Pacificador. But only in the government of Getúlio Vargas, who created the Sanitation Commission of the Baixada Fluminense, the region has advanced. By 1945, more than 6,000 kilometers of rivers were cleared, taking 45,000,000 cubic meters of land from their beds. With this work, the rivers ceased to be mosquito breeding sites, greatly reducing the number of diseases in the region.

When the railroad hit the Meriti Valley, the region began to suffer the effects of urban sprawl in the city of Rio de Janeiro. With the inauguration of Rio de Janeiro North Railway, on 23 April 1886, the region was definitively linked to the former Federal District. With the inauguration of new stations in 1911 by the Leopoldina Railway, the number of passengers and the number of passengers in Gramacho, São Bento, Actura (Campos Elísios), Primavera and Saracuruna neighbourhoods were multiplied.

However, despite this recovery that the railroad had brought, the lowlands continued to suffer from a lack of sanitation, a factor that stagnated their progress. At the beginning of the twentieth century, the lowlands served to alleviate the demographic pressures of the city of Rio de Janeiro. Statistical data show that in 1910, the population was eight hundred people in Meriti, moving in 1920 to 2920. The rapid population growth caused the fractionation and the subdivision of the former rural properties, at that moment, unproductive. Only in 1924, the first electricity grid was installed in the municipality. With the opening of the Rio-Petrópolis Highway in 1928, Meriti once again prospered. Numerous companies bought land and settled in the region because of the proximity to Rio de Janeiro.

The process of emancipation of the city was related to the formation of a group that organized the Popular Caxiense Union (UPC): journalists, doctors and local politicians. In 1940, the pro-emancipation commission was created: Sylvio Goulart, Rufino Gomes, Amadeu Lanzeloti, Joaquim Linhares, José Basílio, Carlos Fraga and Antônio Moreira. The reaction of the government was immediate and the demonstrators were arrested.

In the 1940s, the federal government promoted the cleaning of more than 6,000 kilometers of rivers and built more than two hundred bridges in the Baixada Fluminense.

The great growth through which Meriti passed, led Federal Representative Manuel Reis to propose the creation of the District of Caxias. On 14 March 1931, through the act of the interventor Plínio de Castro Casado, the District of Caxias was created by State Decree No. 2,559, with headquarters in the former Meriti Station, belonging to the then municipality of Nova Iguaçu. On December 31, 1943, through Decree-Law 1055, it was renamed the Municipality, receiving the name Duque de Caxias. The Duque de Caxias region was created by Decree-Law No. 0556, on the same day, month and year. With the emancipation, the municipality received great incentive in its economy. Several people, mainly from the Northeast Region of Brazil, arrived in Rio de Janeiro in search of work and settled in Duque de Caxias. The executive power was officially installed on 1 January 1944.

After the military dictatorship, a great deal of political, business, trade union, and community leadership, the municipality gained its autonomy in 1985.

== Geography ==
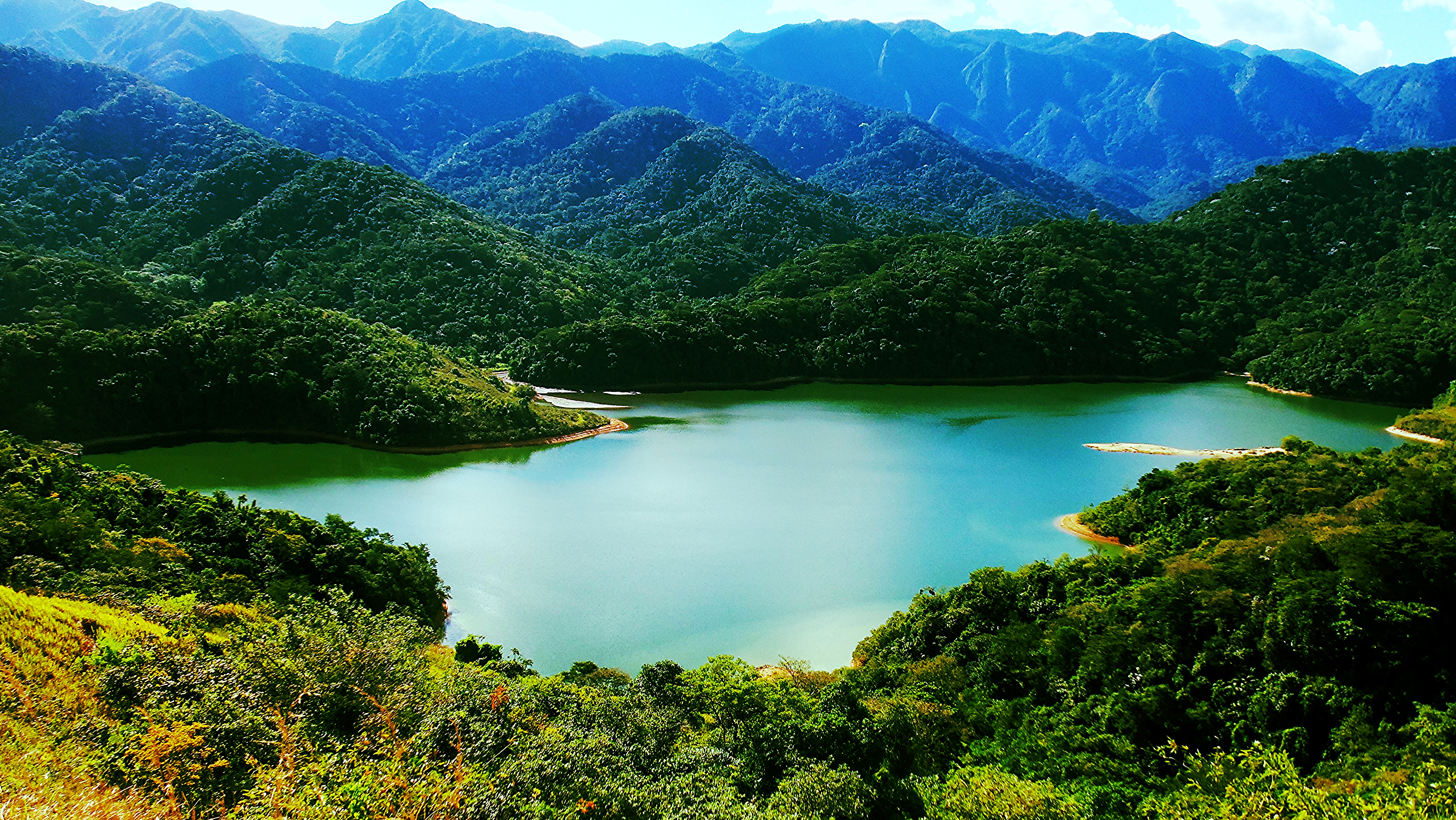
Garrao dam in xerém. The fourth district of the city is situated on the ascent of the Serra Fluminense.

The municipality is limited to the north with Petrópolis and Miguel Pereira, to the east, the Bay of Guanabara and Magé, to the south, with the city of Rio de Janeiro, and in the west, with São João do Meriti, Belford Roxo and Nova Iguaçu. Caxias has a hot climate, however, the 3rd and 4th districts (Imbariê and Xerém) are warm because of the green area and the proximity to the Serra dos Órgãos.

The municipality contains part of the 26,260 hectares (64,900 acres) Tinguá Biological Reserve, a strictly protected Atlantic Forest conservation unit created in 1989. It contains the 19.4 hectares (48 acres) Taquara Municipal Nature Park, visited by up to 4,000 people per month in the summer. It also contains part of the Central Rio de Janeiro Atlantic Forest Mosaic, created in 2006.

The Meriti River separates Duque de Caxias from Rio de Janeiro city. The Rio Iguaçu separates Duque de Caxias and Nova Iguaçu city. The Rio Sarapuí is the division between the 1st and 2nd districts, and Saracuruna River is the division between the 2nd of the 3rd districts.

=== Demographics ===
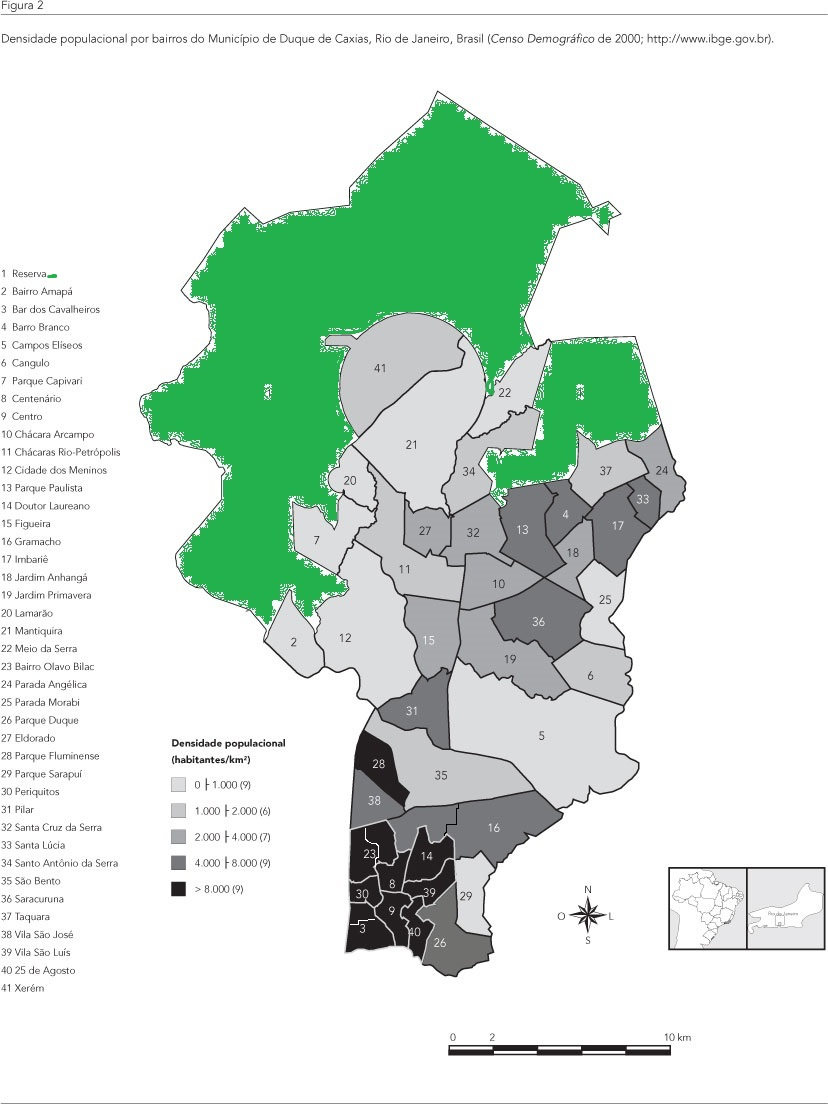
Map of Caxias' neighbourhoods and parks

Duque de Caxias' Population Growth
| Year | Population |
|---|---|
| 1960 | 785 041 |
| 1980 | 776 230 |
| 1995 | 770 669 |
| 2010 | 855 046 |
| 2012 | 858 334 |
| 2013 | 873 921 |

The population of Duque de Caxias is 873,921, up from the 785,041 in 1960. The city is not used to have an expressive index of growing population since it was founded. According to 2010 census, whites were 29.5%, brown (mulato and mixed races) were 58.8% and black people were representing 11.5%. Other races were representing 0.2% of population.

== Economy ==
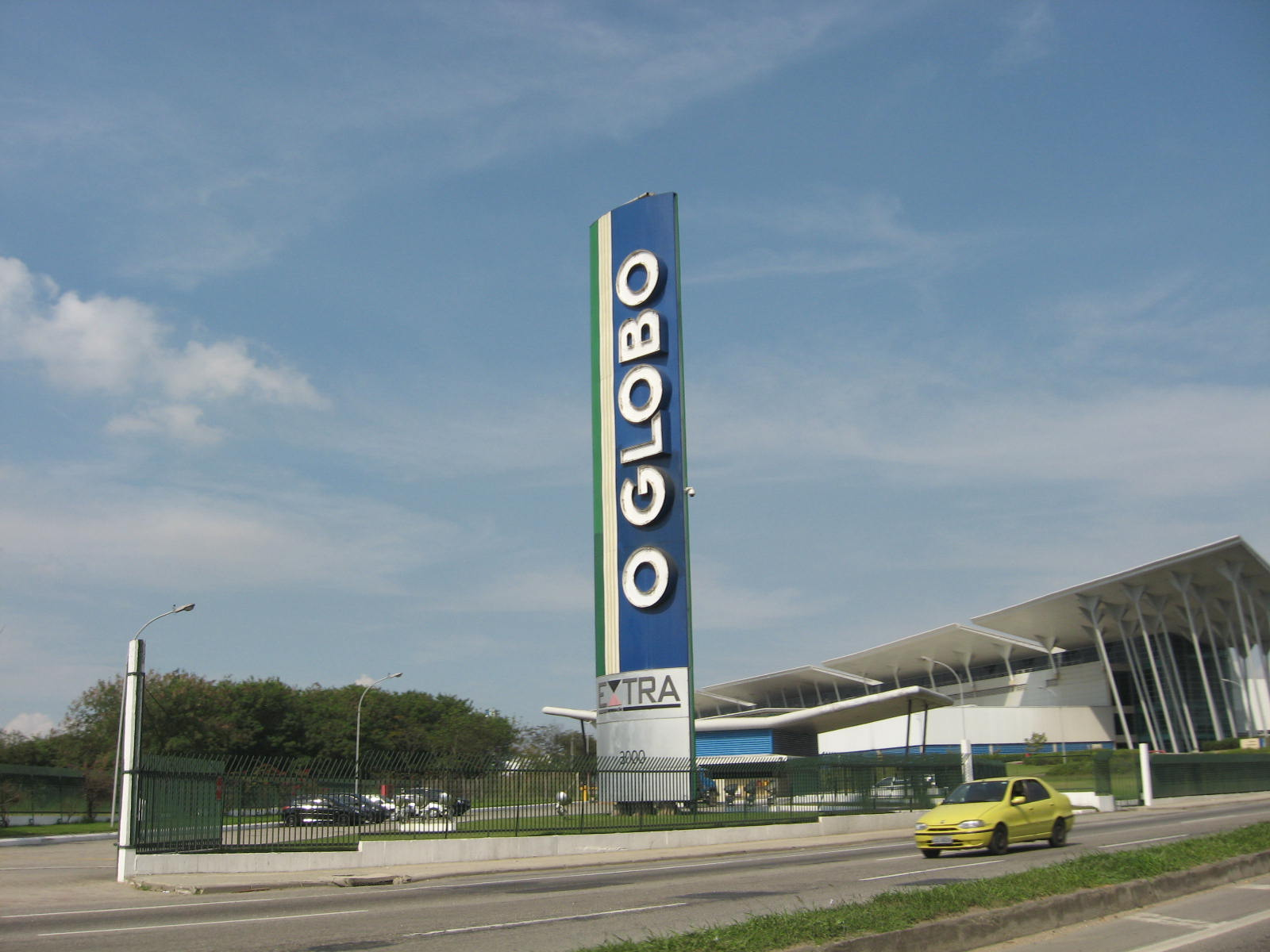
Graphic Park of O Globo journal

Economically, shows great growth in recent years, with the main industry and trade activities. There are about 809 industries and 10 thousand shops installed in the city. According to the IBGE, the municipality of Duque de Caxias registered in 2005, the 15th largest GDP in the national ranking [5] and the second largest in the state of Rio de Janeiro, in a total of 18.3 billion reais. [4] A City ranks second in the ranking of revenues of the state ICMS, losing only to capital. No the municipality is located one of the largest refineries of Petrobras, the reduction, has a gas-chemical pole, with one thermoelectric plant.

The main industries are: chemical, petrochemical, metallurgy, gas, plastics, furniture, textiles and clothing.

Companies in several segments have been installed in Duque de Caxias, such as O Globo journal and Carrefour, taking advantage of the privileged position of the city, near major highways Brazil: Red Line, Yellow Line, President Dutra Highway, Rodovia Washington Luiz Avenue and Brazil, in addition to the proximity of the Tom Jobim International Airport and the distance of only 17 km from downtown Rio, bringing its products to major consumer centers easily: São Paulo, Minas Gerais and southern Brazil. The largest industrial park in Rio de Janeiro is the city, and companies registered as Texaco, Shell, Esso, Ipiranga, White Martins, IBF, Transport Carvalhaes, Sadia, Ciferal, among others. The segment is more concentrated in the sectors of chemical and petrochemical, stimulated by the presence of REDUC, the second largest in the country. In the register of industrial FIRJAN, Duque de Caxias occupies the second position in number of employees in Rio de Janeiro and third in number of establishments, behind only the capital and Petrópolis.

In the center of town there is intense popular trade, the majority concentrated in the streets of José Alvarenga and Nilo Peçanha.

== Transport ==
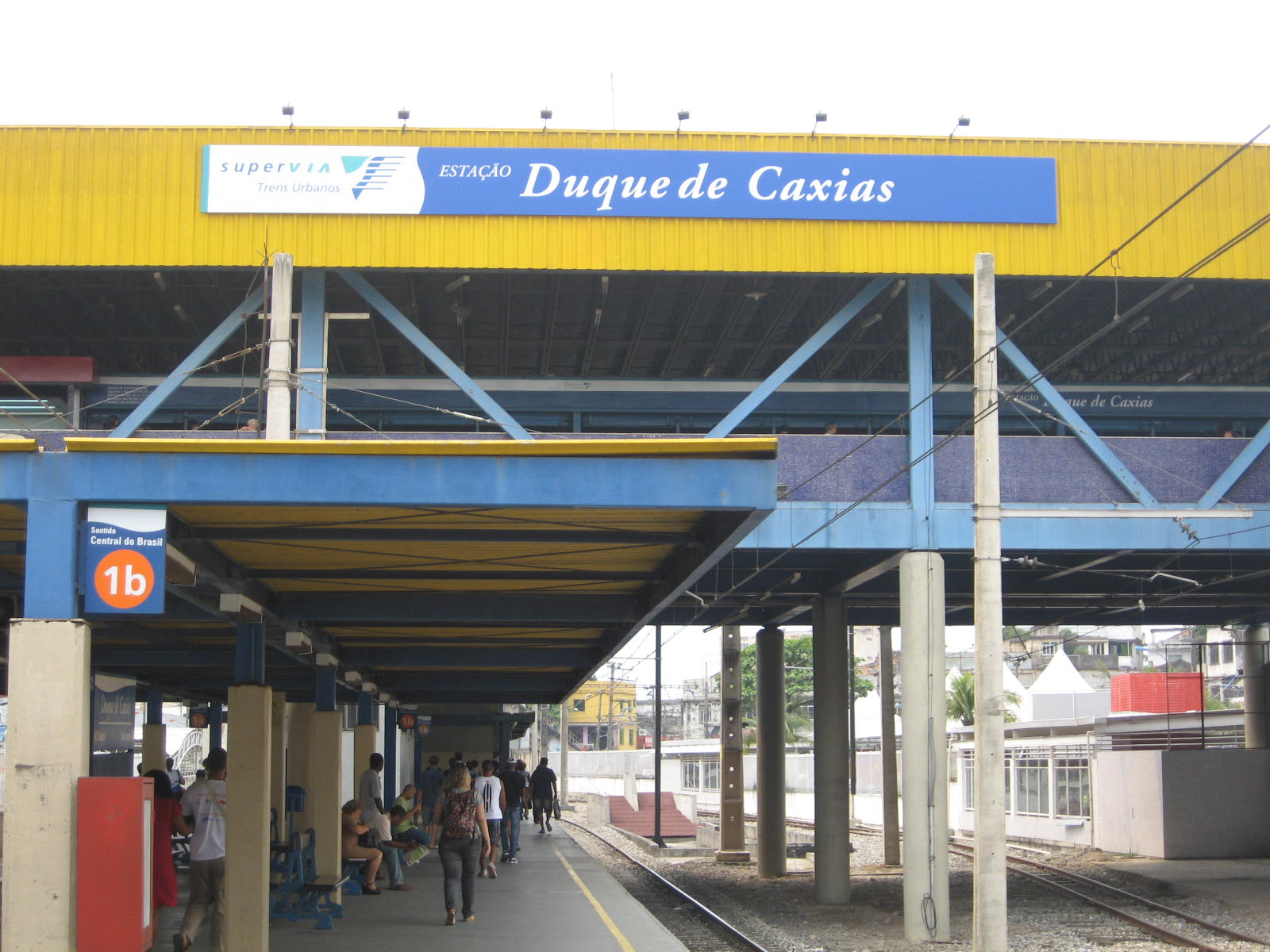
Duque de Caxias train station.

There are 16 public transport companies which serve the municipality, and 11 municipal bus companies, a branch and three intercity rail. The city also have 2 federal highways and is provided with 4 more state roads. Duque de Caxias is also served by a railway branch. Departing from the Central Station of Brazil, the Saracuruna branch cuts off the municipality and integrates with the branch of Vila Inhomirim, thus reaching Magé. In all, there are eleven railway stations in Duque de Caxias: Duque de Caxias, Corte 8, Gramacho, Campos Elíseos, Jardim Primavera, Saracuruna, Parada Morabi, Imbariê, Manoel Belo and Parada Angelica.

=== Main road access ===
- President Kennedy Avenue
- Rio-Teresópolis
- Red Line
- BR-040

== Education ==
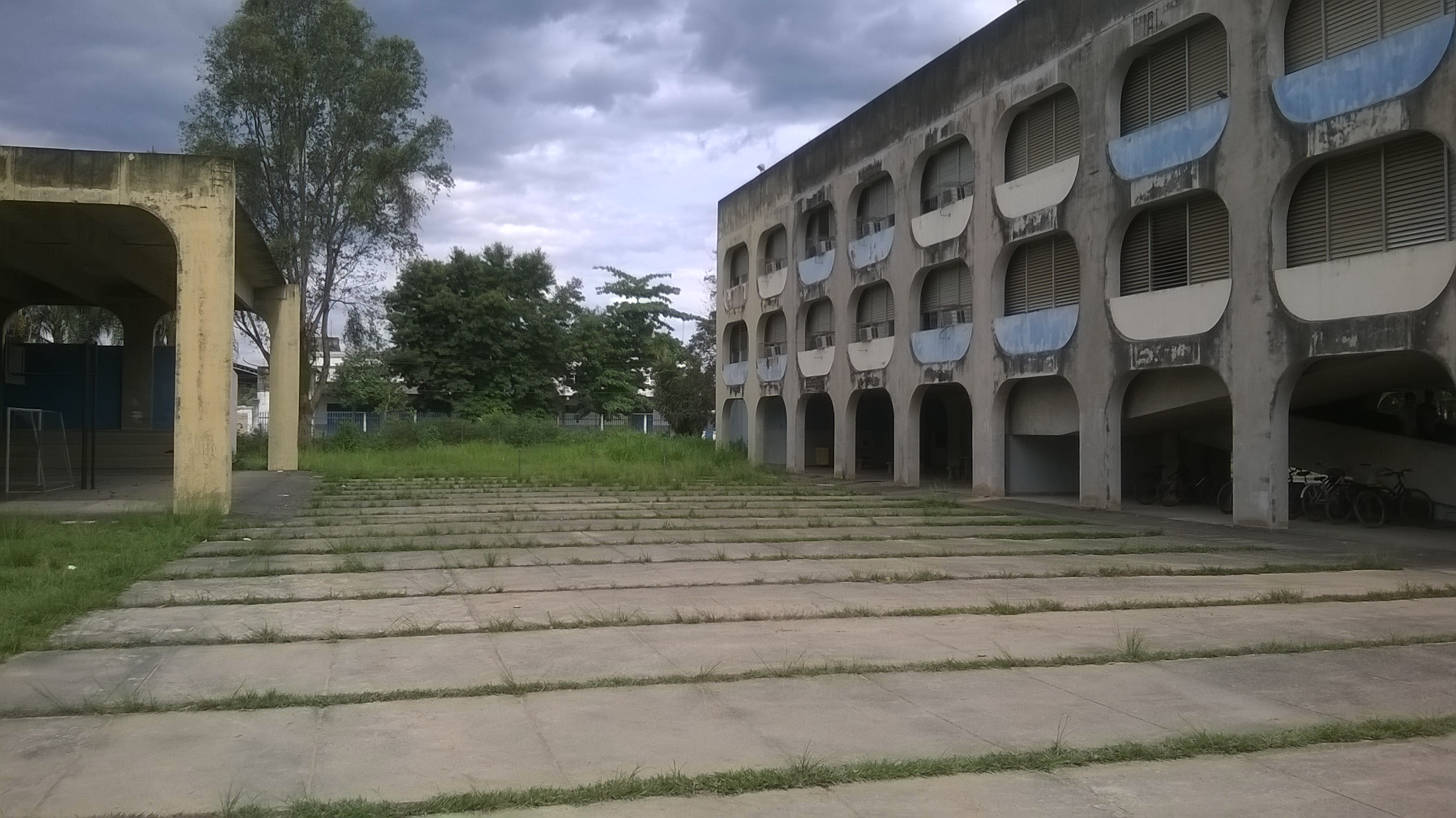
Public school known as "CIEP" in Duque de Caxias

According to Foundation Center for Science and Higher Education, Distance from the state of Rio de Janeiro, the Fundação CECIERJ / Consortium CEDERJ, Duque de Caxias city has 100 schools, 2 schools, federal, 102 state schools and 128 private schools. As the literacy rate of people living in the city with 10 years of age or older around 92.40% of the population. Some higher education institutions operating in the city:

The Federal University of Rio de Janeiro, with a campus in Xerém, offers graduate programs in nanotechnology, metrology, bioinformatics, forensic science and biotechnology from the second half of 2008.

The Faculty of Education of Baixada Fluminense is a state institution located in St. Louis suburb of Town and is a campus of the State University of Rio de Janeiro in the region, therefore, is subject to the university. Offers the graduate programs in education, mathematics and geography and also post-graduate: Specialist in curriculum organization and teaching in basic education and Masters in Education, Culture and Communication in urban peripheries.

Back the origins of the 1969 Educational Foundation of Duque de Caxias (FEUDUC). The graduate courses in biology, history, geography, mathematics, literature and information are supplied by the private institution, in addition to post-graduate.

The UNIGRANRIO is the largest and best known institution of higher education in Duque de Caxias, was created in the 70's with the name of Fluminense Association for Education (AFE) to be recognized as a university in 1994, when they adopted the current name. Their headquarters or main campus is located in the Garden district on August 25, and units in the Center and in Santa Cruz da Serra, also has campuses or units in other districts of the state and city of Rio de Janeiro, Silva Jardim, Niagara Falls, Campos of Goytacazes, Macaé and St. John of Meriti.

The council also has a campus of the University of Sa Estácio, located in the Garden August 25, where the courses are offered in polytechnics, and post-graduate degree in administration, law, computer science and letters.

There is also the School of Social Service Santa Luzia, a private garden also located in the district on August 25.

Duque de Caxias is one of the best schools in Brazil, Cefet-chemical, known as Cefeteq – Caxias. It also has one of the more traditional schools of Brazil, Pedro II College

== Culture and Tourism ==
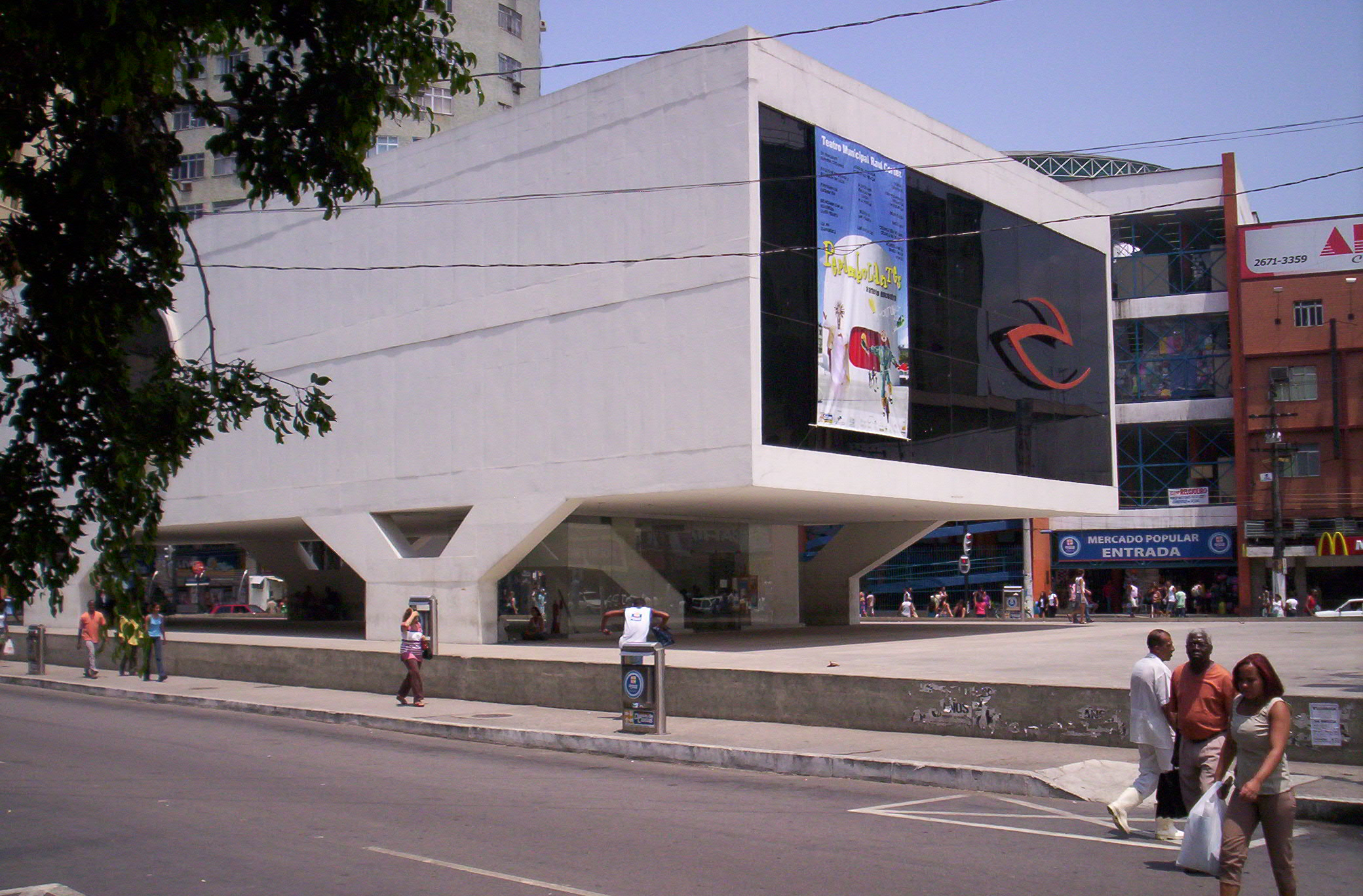
Biblioteca municipal(Caxias Library), located at Duque de Caxias Downtown

The city with the Centro Cultural Oscar Niemeyer, the square of the Center Pacifier in the neighborhood, with the Public Library Leonel de Moura Brizola and Teatro Municipal Raul Cortez. The library contains about 10 thousand works and theater is composed of 440 seats.

The Municipality of Duque de Caxias houses the Historical Institute and Theater Procópio Ferreira. On December 11, 1980, through Resolution 494, the Office received the name of Alderman Thomé Siqueira Barreto and has in its collection, about 6 thousand photographic reproductions, a thousand documents, 680 books and periodicals, 1,700 newspapers and 85 tables. Among the pieces of the collection are a candlestick and a picture of St. Anthony, remnants of the former Church of St. John Baptist Traiaponga (today Santa Terezinha in Laifaiete Park), photos of the arrival of piped water in Duque de Caxias, the construction of the National Plant of engines (FNM), the visit of Juscelino Kubitschek and the reduction of the Village Code of Postura Star, 1846.

== Heritage ==
Our Lady of Pilar Church – Located in the Old Road of Pillar, the church was built in 1720. Has strong features baroque, similar to buildings made in Minas Gerais and the material of its construction came from the Monastery of St. Benedict, as registration with gazetteer and Description of the Empire of Brazil, in 1863. Used by D. Pedro I, the former Port of Pilar was an important center for landing when the emperor was the center of Rio de Janeiro by the Guanabara Bay and sailed for the tributary of the Rio Iguaçu, until the Rio Pilar, where the port is located. The "New Way", as was known, was opened in 1704 by Garcia Pais, near the town of Our Lady of the Old Path. The church was registered on May 25, 1938.

Fazenda São Bento – The oldest farm in the municipality came to purchase the Monastery of St. Benedict of parts of the land of Christopher Monteiro, in 1591, initiating the process of colonization of the Vale do Rio Iguaçu. Today, only ruins remain of the chapel which dates from 1645 and the big house built between 1754 and 1757, and fallen to historic heritage on June 10, 1957.

== Amenities ==
The theater at City Hall was inaugurated on 28 February 1975. Thirteen days later, was baptized with the name of Procópio Ferreira, in homage to the great actor and theatrical producer, through resolution No 1957 of 1975, signed by the Chairman of the Board of Luna Luis Braz. Ferreira Procópio himself and his daughter Bibi Ferreira, attended the event and were the highlights of the festival, alongside Nelson Carneiro. In 1978, the piece bag Canudos staged in the theater prize Molière in the special category, made in the national network announced in the Official National Rede Globo.

The oldest public theater of Duque de Caxias is Armando Melo Theater, founded in 1967.

== Sports ==
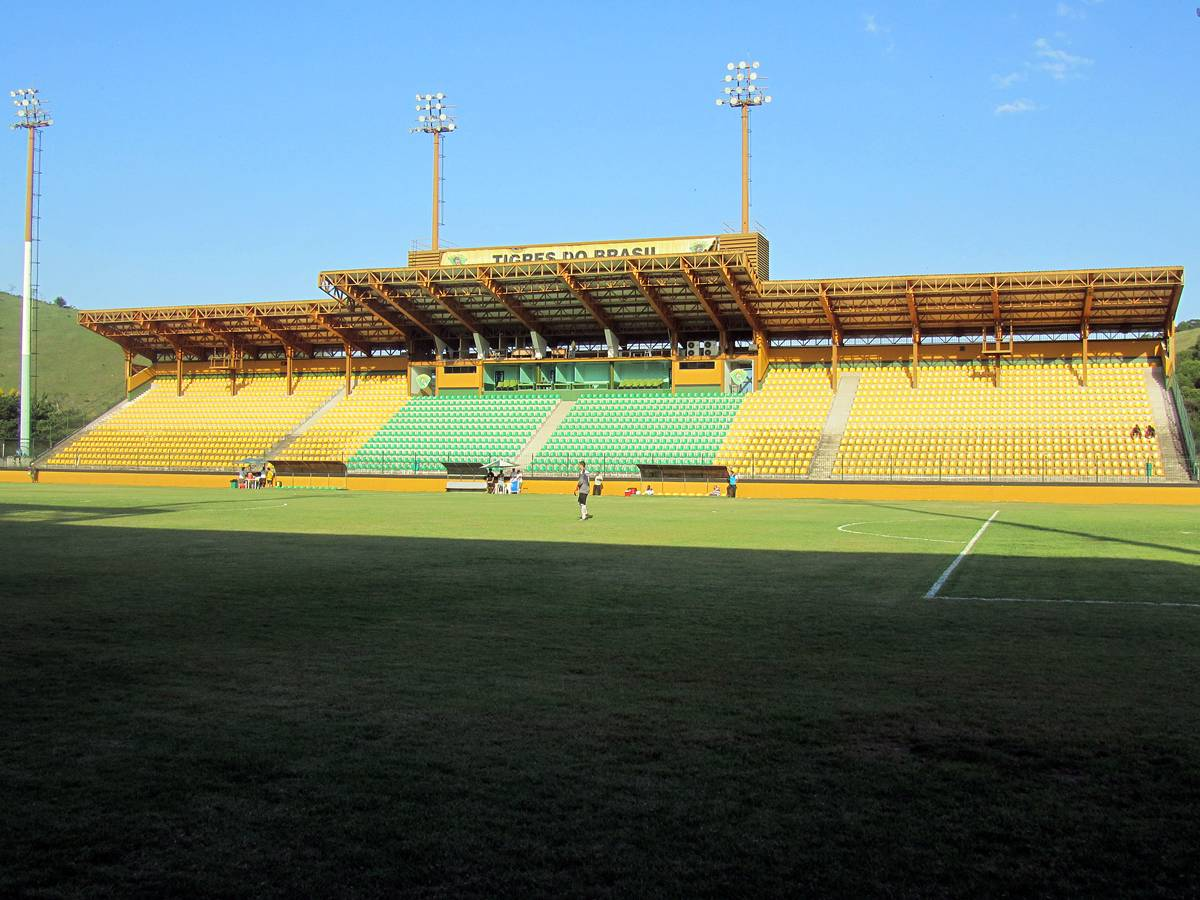
Estádio de Los Larios is the biggest of Duque de Caxias with capacity to 11,000 people

The city hosts two football clubs: Duque de Caxias Futebol Clube is currently in the Campeonato Brasileiro Série B in 2009 and Esporte Clube Tigres do Brasil, both of which competed in the top level of the state championship in 2009.

Duque de Caxias has two football stadiums, the Romário de Souza Faria is the Duque de Caxias Futebol Clube and has capacity for 10,000 spectators and the Estádio De Los Larios is Tigres do Brasil Esporte Clube's stadium with a capacity for 11,000 spectators.

Duque de Caxias also has an Olympic village.

== Neighborhoods and districts ==
=== District 1 ===
- Centro (downtown)
- Jardim Vinte e Cinco de Agosto
- Parque Beira Mar
- Centenário
- Engenho do Porto
- Parque Duque
- Parque Lafaiete
- Vila São Luís
- Jardim Leal
- Gramacho
- Sarapuí
- Doutor Laureano
- Bar dos Cavaleiros
- Jardim Gramacho
- Olavo Bilac
- Periquitos
- Corte Oito

=== District 2 ===
- Campos Elíseos
- Pilar
- Cidade dos Meninos
- Jardim Primavera
- Figueira
- Capivari
- Saracuruna

=== District 3 ===
- Imbariê
- Nova Campina
- Santa Cruz da Serra
- Cangulo
- Chacarás Rio Petropolis
- Chacara Arcampo
- Eldourado
- Taquara
- Parque Paulista
- Parque Equitativa
- Alto da Serra
- Santa Lúcia
- Jardim Anhangá
- Parada Morabi

=== District 4 ===
- Xerém
- Mantiquira
- Parque Capivari
- Jardim Olimpo
- Lamarão
- Amapá
- Vila Canaã

== Notable people ==
- Luis Alves de Lima e Silva – Brazilian military and political figure
- Fernandinho Beira-Mar – leader of the Comando Vermelho
- Júlio César – ex-footballer, goalkeeper
- Roberto Dinamite – ex-footballer
- Bruna Marquezine – actress
- Marcelly Morena – singer and dancer
- Davidson – footballer
- Alex Teixeira – footballer
- Tiffani Marinho – athlete
- Wendel –footballer
