= Meriti River =

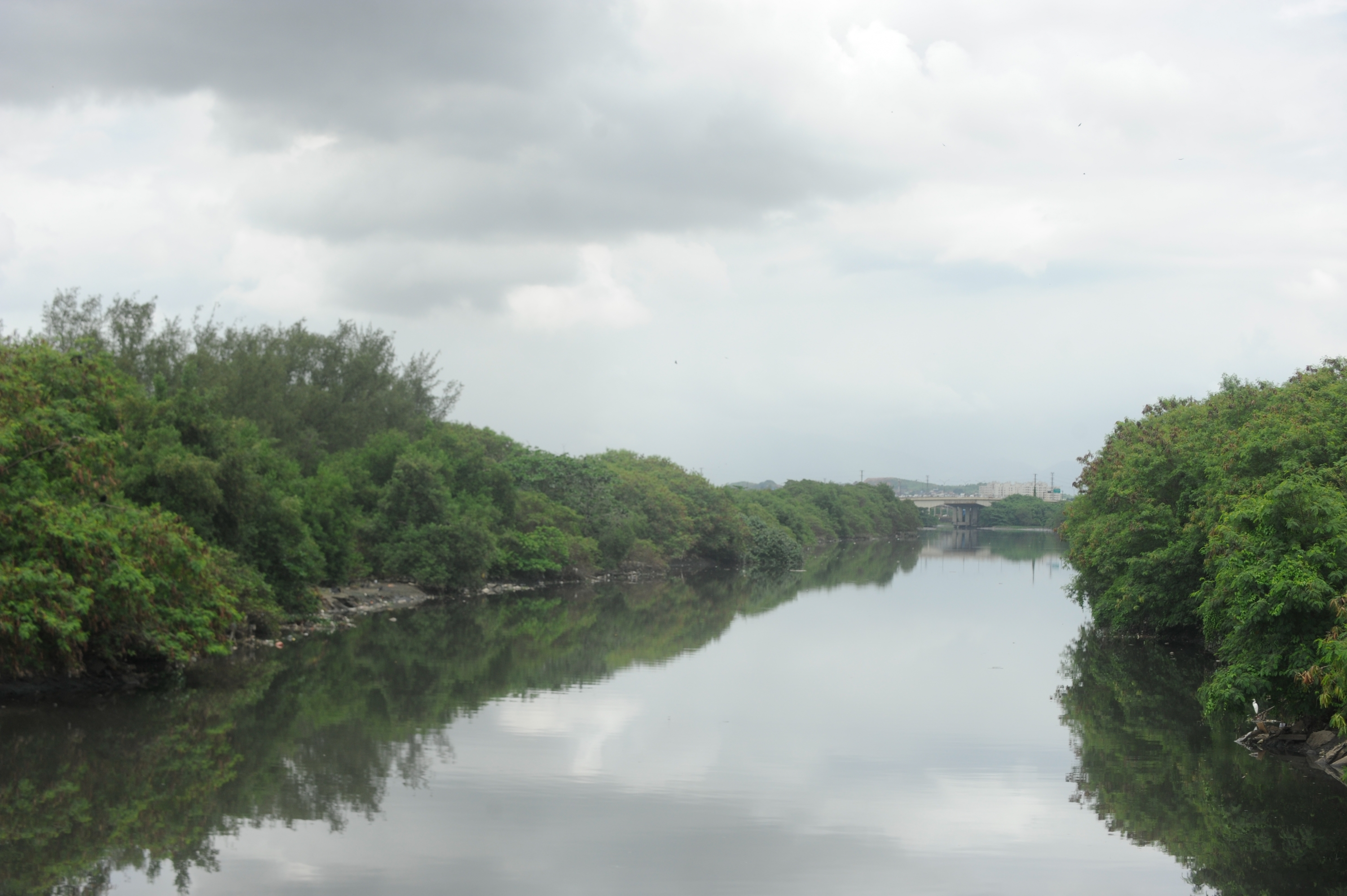

Location
- Country: Brazil

Physical characteristics
- Source
  - location: Maciço da Pedra Branca, Rio de Janeiro
- Mouth
  - location: Guanabara Bay
  - coordinates: 22°48′17″S 43°16′32″W
- Length: 25.8 km (16.0 mi)
- Basin size: 167 km^{2} (64 sq mi)

The Meriti is a river in Rio de Janeiro state in south-eastern Brazil.

It separates the municipalities of Duque de Caxias and São João de Meriti (north) from the state capital of Rio de Janeiro (south). Its mouth is at Guanabara Bay.

The name is of Tupi origin and means "water of the buriti" (from mburi'ti ("buriti") and 'y ("water")).

== See also ==
- Maracanã River in Rio de Janeiro city.
- List of rivers in Rio de Janeiro state
