= Xerém =

Human settlement in Brazil

Coordinates: 22°35′S 43°18′W

Xerém (Portuguese pronunciation: [ʃeˈɾẽj]) is a neighborhood of Xerém District in the municipality of Duque de Caxias in the state of Rio de Janeiro, about 50 km from the city of Rio de Janeiro.

Xerém lies on the slopes of the Serra Fluminense, near Petrópolis. Within its boundaries are a bus factory (Ciferal Marcopolo), the training camp of Fluminense Football Club, the headquarters of Duque de Caxias FC and the football team Tigres do Brasil.

Xerém is known for having an important government agency in Brazil, INMETRO.

Tourism is a significant factor of the local economy; tourists are drawn by the lush and placid scenery, the nearby waterfalls, and historical sites.

Every year Xerém host Vaquejada Park Ana Dantas. Past shows have included artists such as:

- Ivete Sangalo
- Pixote
- Rouge
- Sandy & Junior

The singer Zeca Pagodinho lives in the district of Xerém at Duque de caxias.
