= Copa Rio =

Copa Rio may refer to:

- Copa Rio (international tournament), an international football tournament held in Brazil in the 1950s
- Copa Rio (state cup), a football tournament in which Rio de Janeiro's state teams take part
- Taça Rio, a Rio de Janeiro football tournament, the second stage of the state's championship
