= Copa Rio (international tournament) =

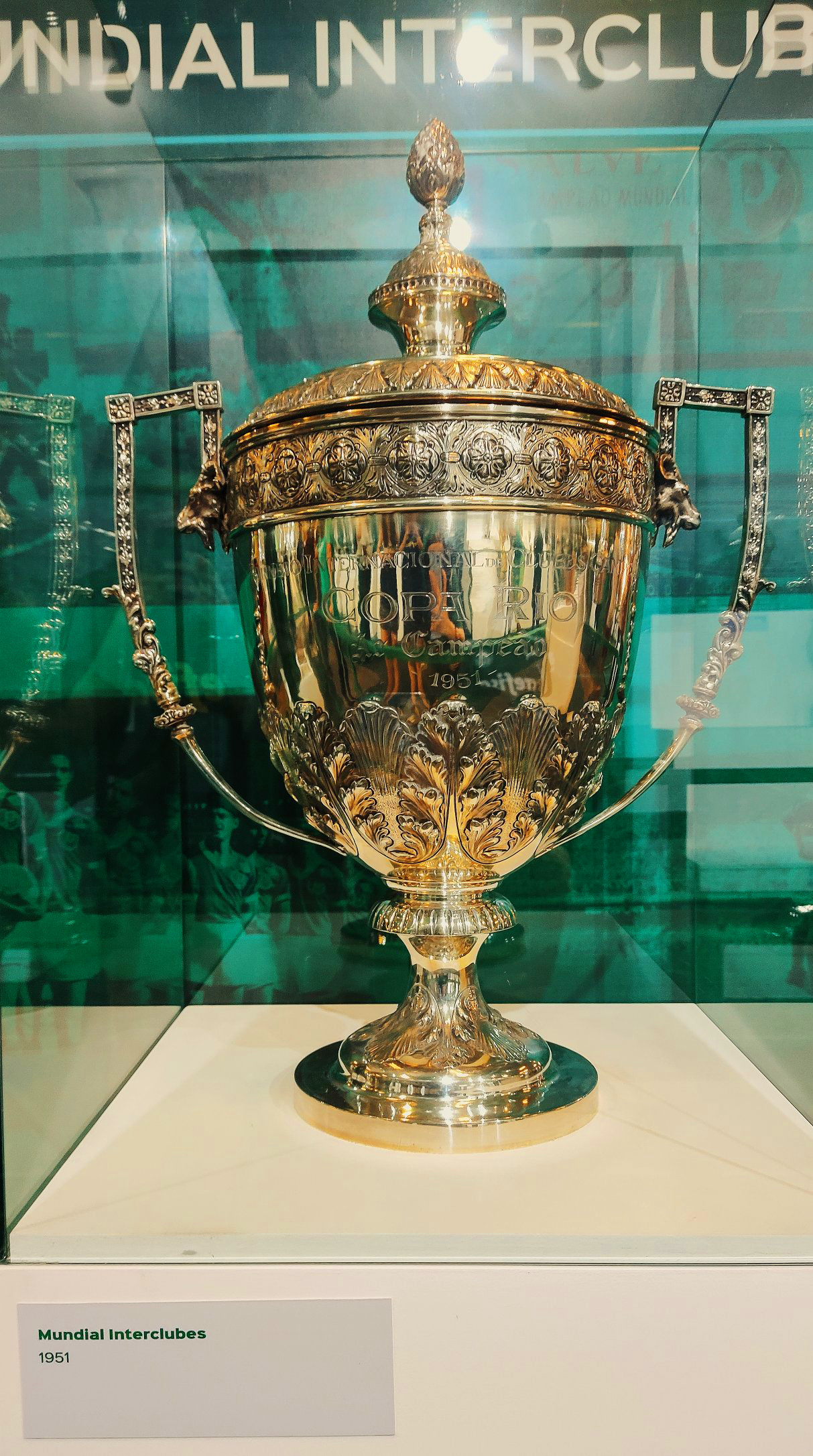
- The trophy awarded to the champions Palmeiras in 1951
- Organiser(s): (Brazil) CBD
- Founded: 1951
- Abolished: 1952; 74 years ago
- Region: Rio de Janeiro, Brazil
- Teams: 8
- Related competitions: Torneio Rivadavia Correa - International Soccer League
- Last champions: (Brazil) Fluminense (1952)
- Most championships: (Brazil) Palmeiras (Brazil) Fluminense (1 title each)

The Copa Rio (English: Rio Cup) was an international club football tournament with teams from Europe and South America, having been held on two occasions, in 1951 and 1952, in Brazil. Both editions were organised and endorsed by the Brazilian Sports Confederation (Confederação Brasileira de Desportos), the then Brazilian FA and sports main body. The tournament is often regarded in Brazil as an official tournament, at least as far as the Brazilian clubs are concerned. The name Copa Rio, Portuguese for Rio Cup, was a homage to Rio de Janeiro City. The 1951 edition of the competition was also hailed as "Club World Cup" or "World Champions Cup" by the Brazilian FA and press. Though some previous club competitions (Football World Championship, Sir Thomas Lipton Trophy, Coupe des Nations) may have been hailed as "the club world contest", Copa Rio was the first attempt at creating a Club World Cup with intercontinental reach.

Two editions of the Copa Rio were held, in 1951 and 1952. Brazilian club Palmeiras won the 1951 tournament, and Fluminense, also from Brazil and co-organizer of the 1952 edition, won the competition in 1952 (CBD, the Brazilian FA, entitled Fluminense to organise the 1952 tournament as part of its 50th anniversary celebrations- the second edition of the tournament was originally scheduled to 1953, but was advanced to 1952 for the aforementioned anniversary celebrations). In 1951 and 1952, Copa Rio suffered the concurrence of the Latin Cup, as some European clubs declined to participate in the former in order to participate in the latter; in 1952, Copa Rio suffered the concurrence of the 1952 Small Club World Cup, as Millonarios and Real Madrid declined to participate in the former in order to participate in the latter. The 1951-1952 Copa Rio was succeeded by another intercontinental club cup organised by the Brazilian FA, the 1953 Torneio Octogonal Rivadavia Correa Meyer, which was then often referred to also as Copa Rio by the European press, which was won by Vasco da Gama from Brazil. In 1953, the Uruguayan FA launched their own intercontinental club cup, based on Copa Rio, and named Copa Montevideo, having been played in Uruguay in 1953 and 1954, won respectively by Nacional and Peñarol. The last attempt of the Brazilian FA to create an intercontinental club cup occurred in 1955, with the Torneio Internacional Charles Miller won by Corinthians, the same year the European Cup emerged and became the main international priority of the European football clubs. In 1960, the International Soccer League rose in the USA as another attempt at creating a "Club World Cup" along the lines of Copa Rio, but, as a "world-champions honour", it was overshadowed in importance by the Intercontinental Cup.

== History ==
=== Creation ===
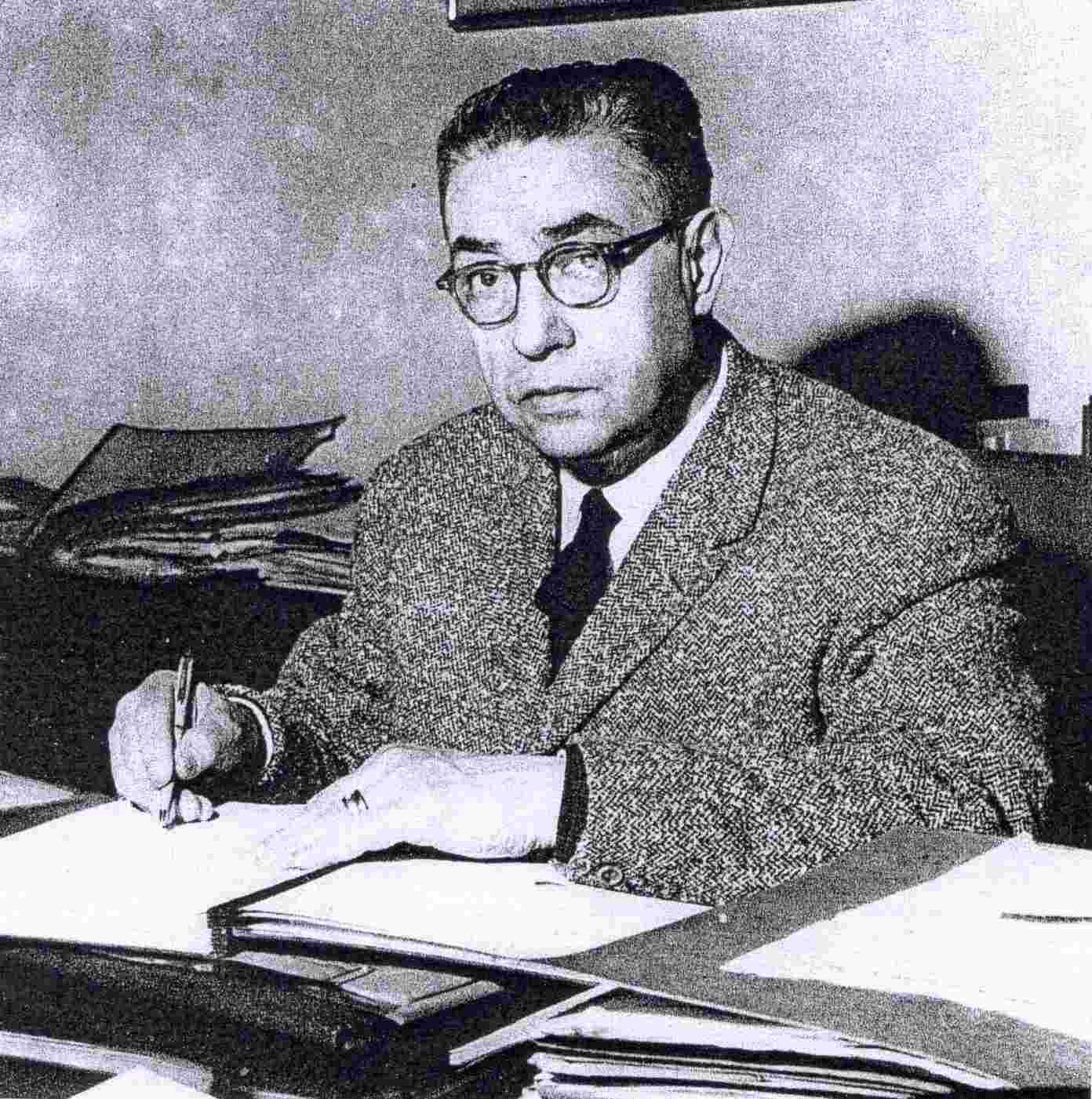
Ottorino Barassi, a top FIFA administrator involved in the organisation of Copa Rio along with Mário Filho and the CBD, envisaging it as a "champion clubs-version" of the FIFA World Cup

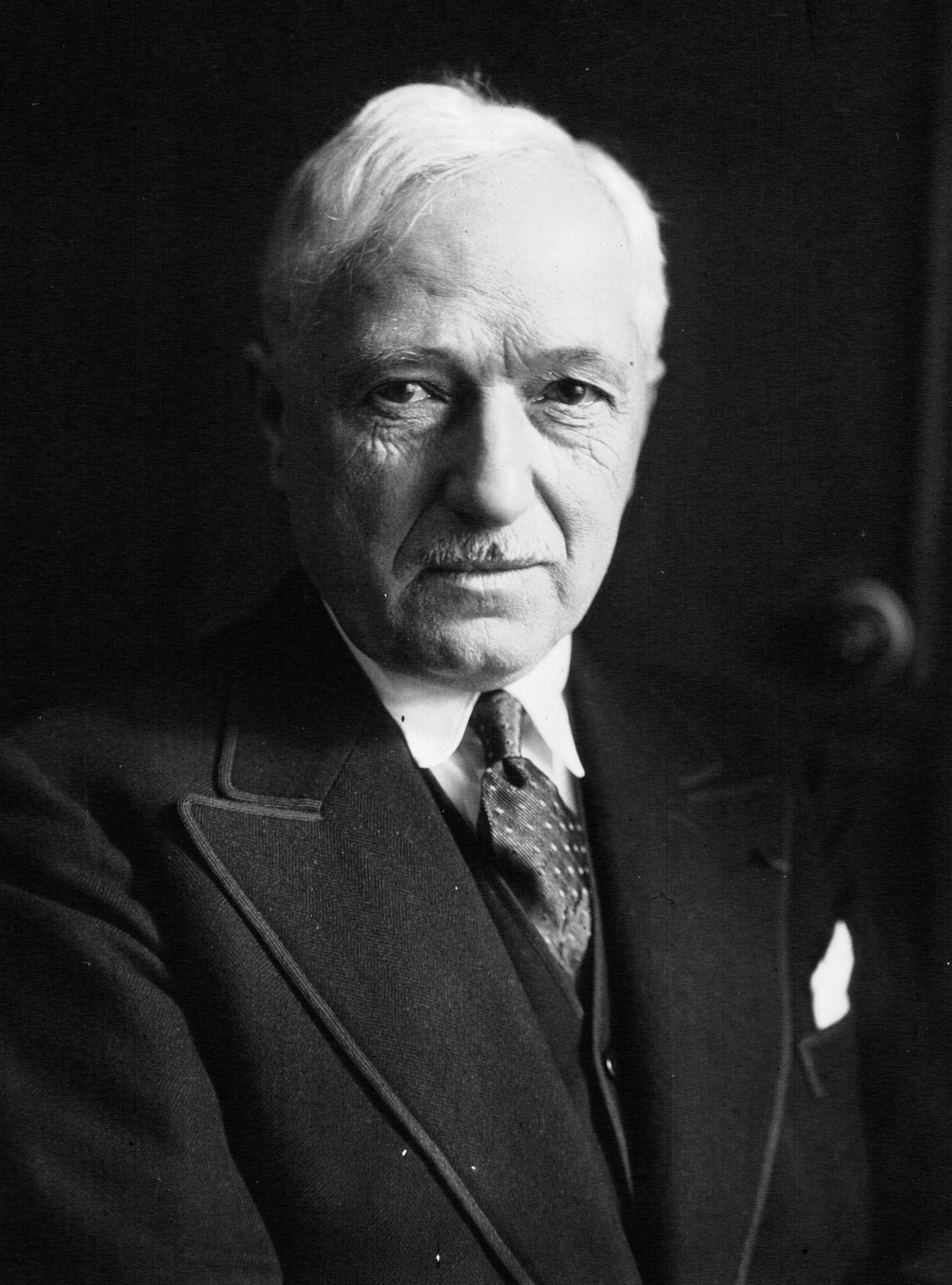
Jules Rimet, founder of the FIFA World Cup and FIFA president in 1950–51, gave his blessing to the creation of Copa Rio

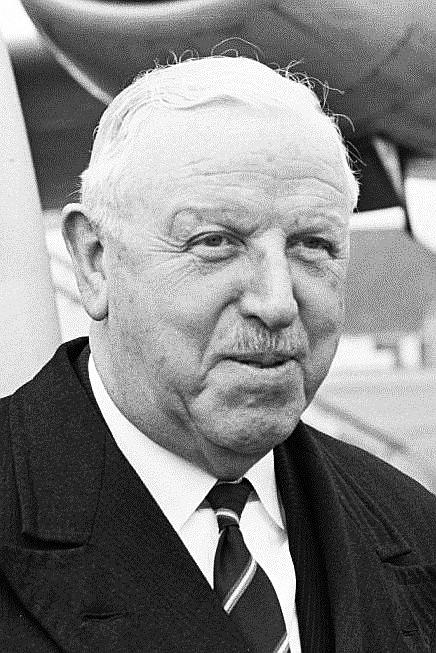
Stanley Rous, another top FIFA administrator, gave his blessing to both Copa Rio and the 1960 ISL, created along Copa Rio's lines

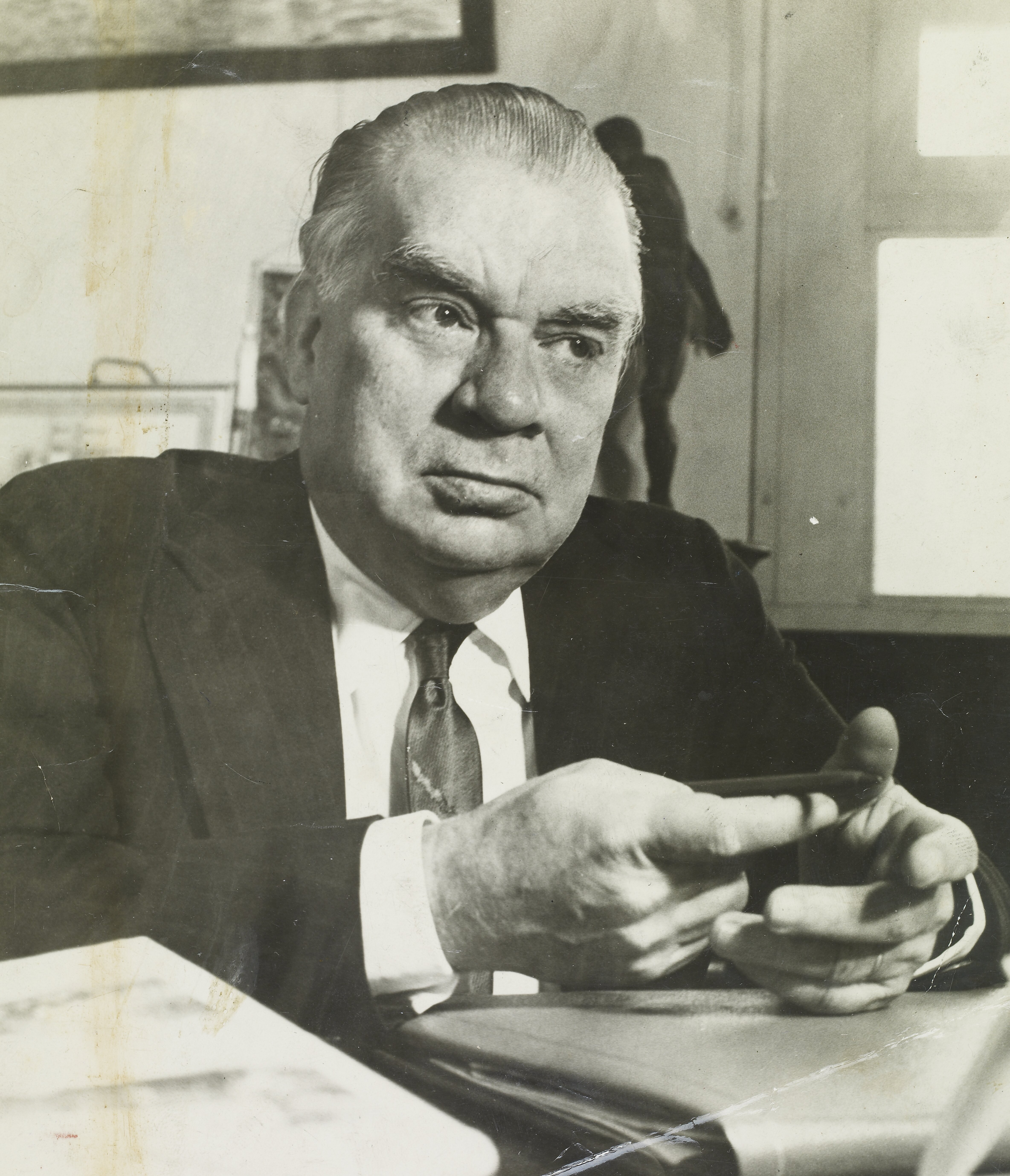
Mário Filho, from Jornal dos Sports, proposed in 1950 the creation of Copa Rio as a Club World Cup

The competition was the brainchild of Brazilian sports journalist Mário Filho, from Jornal dos Sports newspaper, who envisaged it as a Club World Cup (based on the FIFA World Cup for nations, held in Brazil in 1950) to be permanently held in Brazil, turning (according to him) Rio de Janeiro as "world's club football capital city". Mário Filho put the idea forward in 1950, during the 1950 FIFA World Cup, framing the idea as a possibly promising "club version" of the FIFA World Cup, having the idea been praised by Jules Rimet, Ottorino Barassi and Stanley Rous, who were in Brazil for the 1950 FIFA World Cup. The Brazilian FA endorsed Mário Filho's idea, and organised the competition with a view to creating a Club World Cup. Two top-ranking FIFA officials helped organise the competition, framing the tournament model and helping convince European clubs to participate: Ottorino Barassi and Stanley Rous (the latter having participated only for the 1951 tournament, while the former participated for both 1951-1952 tournaments and also for the 1953 successor tournament, having Barassi come personally to Rio de Janeiro often in 1951 for that reason). FIFA president Jules Rimet made statements praising and bidding good luck to the initiative of the Brazilian FA. The Brazilian FA and press, at the time of the 1951 tournament, dubbed it a "Club World Cup" or "World Champions Cup", a label that would later be applied to the Intercontinental Cup (1960–2004) and the FIFA Club World Cup.

=== Organization ===
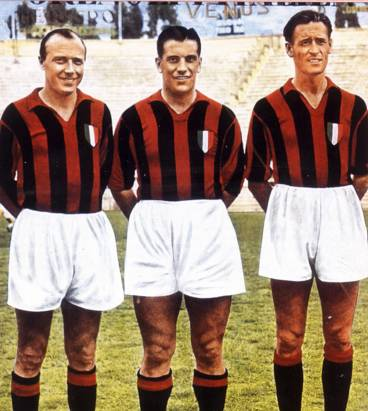
The Gre-No-Li Trio: Gunnar Gren, Gunnar Nordahl and Nils Liedholm. The impossibility to count on their 3 main stars, as they were entitled to vacations after the end of the European season, was allegedly the reason for the Italian 1951 champions AC Milan to relinquish participation in the 1951 Copa Rio, ceding their berth to the 1950 champions Juventus

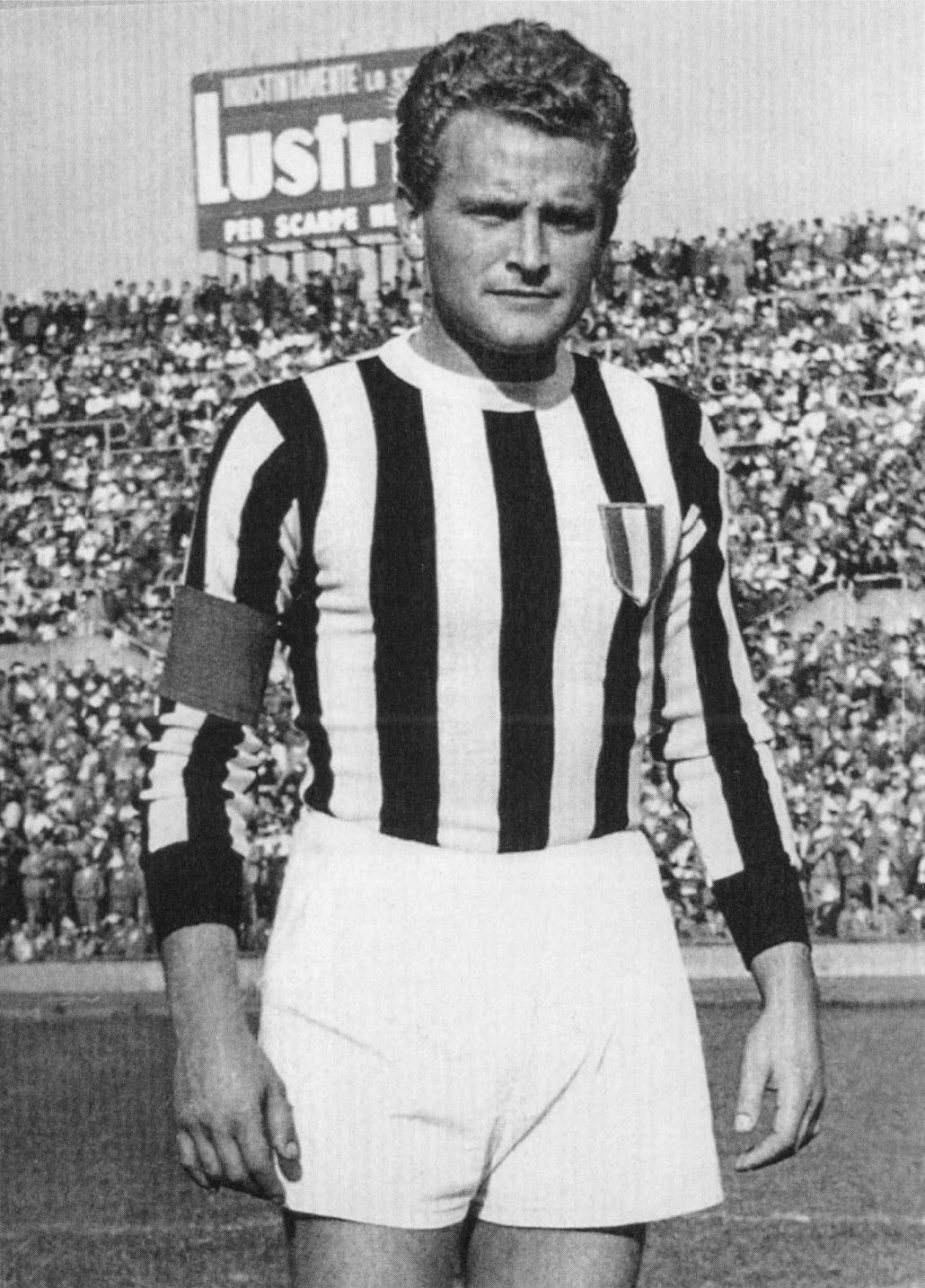
Giampiero Boniperti, considered by some the greatest footballer in Italian history, was the main European player at 1951 Copa Rio. In 2007, he gave an interview to Placar, saying that he and his Juventus teammates played the 1951 Copa Rio seeing it as the legitimate Club World Cup

The idea was to gather together the reigning champions of the world's top football national leagues, in order to determine the world club champion, following the "champions cup" model of competitions such as the Latin Cup and the South American Championship of Champions, the same model that would be used in 1955 for the creation of the UEFA Champions League. At first, a 16-club cup was envisaged, following the FIFA World Cup intended number of participants; however, this proposal was soon shortened to an 8-club cup. In 1951, there did not exist the FIFA Ranking, nor any "qualification tournament" for clubs to qualify to intercontinental club competitions (from 1960 on, the UEFA Champions and Libertadores cups would serve as "qualification tournaments" for the Intercontinental Cup), so in 1951 the organisers of Copa Rio (the Brazilian FA, Ottorino Barassi, Stanley Rous, Mário Filho) had to rely on their view of football history (mainly the FIFA World Cup history) in order to elect which were the strongest national football leagues of the world, whose champion clubs would be invited to Copa Rio. According to Brazilian newspapers O Estado de São Paulo and Jornal do Brasil, and Spanish newspaper El Mundo Deportivo, the original 8-club plan of the Brazilian FA (organiser of Copa Rio) was to organise the competition with the reigning champion clubs of the Rio de Janeiro and São Paulo state Leagues (the first Brazilian national cup, named Taça Brasil, was not established until 1959, and the Rio de Janeiro and São Paulo state leagues were – and still are – the strongest state leagues in Brazil), as well as the reigning club champions from Uruguay, Italy, Spain, England (participants at the 1950 FIFA World Cup, held in Brazil, not to mention the status of Uruguay and Italy as former FIFA World Cup Champions and England as the founders of the sport), Portugal (the Portuguese champions were invited in order to please the huge Portuguese community living in Rio de Janeiro and São Paulo) and Scotland (based on Scotland being as successful as England in the British Home Championship). It must be borne in mind that, in 1951, some countries (such as Netherlands, Belgium, Denmark, Colombia, Chile, Mexico, etc) were not yet considered as strong-football countries (given their 1930-1950 FIFA World Cup history), and that Germany and the Iron Curtain countries (Soviet Union, Hungary, Poland, Czechoslovakia, Bulgaria and Romania) were then excluded from international football due to the post-War, early Cold War tensions. During the first talks about the organization of Copa Rio, some other countries were considered, such as Argentina (Argentina was already a very relevant country in football, but the Argentines chose not to participate in the 1950 FIFA World Cup held in Brazil, as Brazil's and Argentina's Football Associations had severed relations after a brawl in a 1946 match between the two national teams) and Sweden (the 3rd placed-team in the 1950 FIFA World Cup, whose champion Malmö FF was not invited as the club had not pleased the Brazilian football audience in a former visit to the country), but the final plan of the Brazilian FA for the organisation of Copa Rio (published by Jornal dos Sports on March 16th 1951) ended up consisting of an 8-team cup with the reigning champions (1950 South American season and 1950/1951 European season) of Rio de Janeiro, São Paulo, Portugal, Spain, England, Scotland, Italy and Uruguay. However, no British or Spanish clubs accepted to participate in Copa Rio: Tottenham, Newcastle United, Hibernian, Barcelona and Atlético Madrid were all invited to the 1951 Copa Rio and declined to participate (as for the Madrid team, they declined participation in Copa Rio supposedly due to its proximity of dates with the Latin Cup).

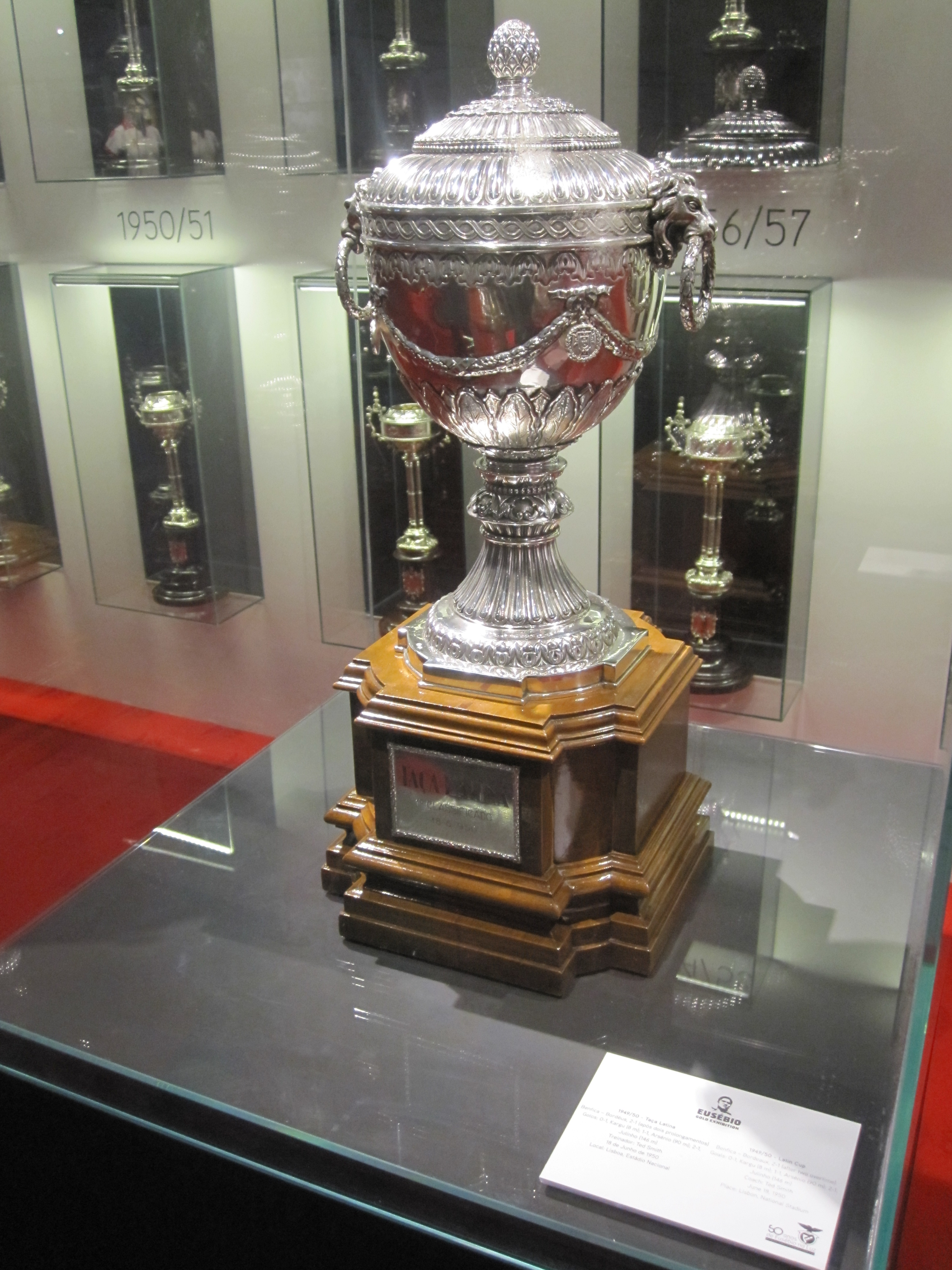
The Latin Cup trophy. Copa Rio suffered the concurrency of the Latin Cup, as 5 clubs (2 in 1951, 3 in 1952) declined to participate in Copa Rio supposedly in order to prioritise the Latin Cup. Differently from the others, Sporting CP played both cups, in both 1951/1952 and also the 1953 cup

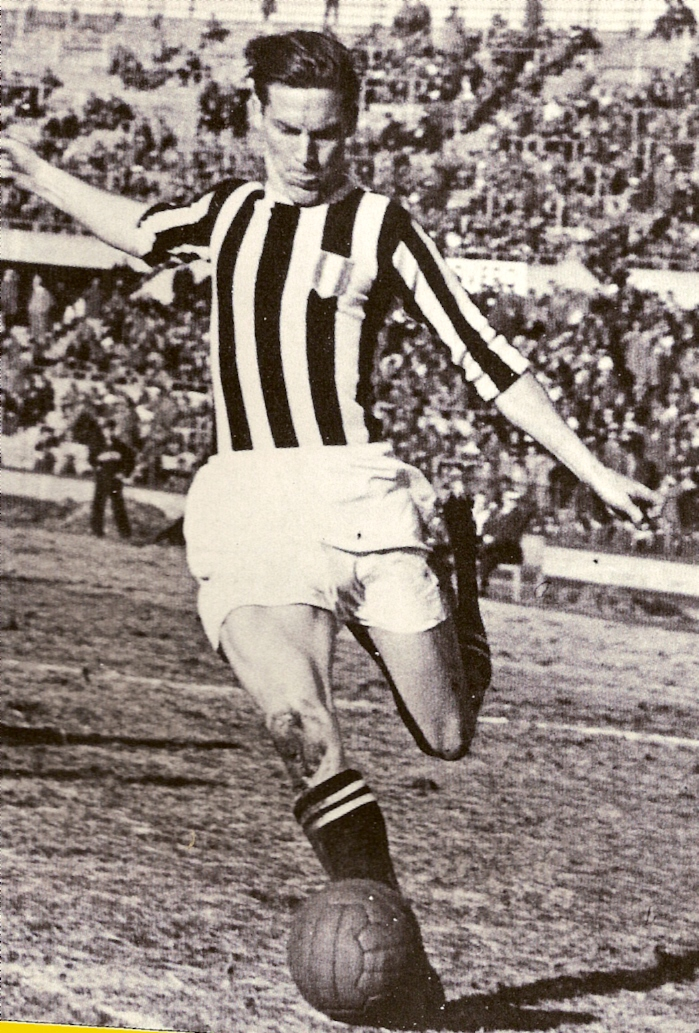
Karl Aage Praest, one member of the Juventus's "Danish Trio" who played Copa Rio, which included also John Hansen and Karl Aage Hansen

Thus, the Brazilian FA invited/accepted teams from other countries to participate in Copa Rio: Nice, from France, Austria Wien, from Austria (at the time, the most successful federation at the Mitropa Cup), and Red Star, from Yugoslavia (the next highest-ranked nation at the 1950 World Cup). However, the Austrian representative, Austria Wien, were previous national champions (1949-1950 season), while another club, Rapid Wien, were the reigning (1950-1951 season) Austrian champions; Rapid Wien were not invited to Copa Rio by the Brazilian FA as the club had not pleased the Brazilian audience in a previous tour to the country. As for the Italian representative, the Brazilian FA invited the reigning (1950-1951) Italian champions AC Milan, who declined to participate (supposedly due to the proximity of dates between Copa Rio and the Latin Cup), whereupon the organisers invited the previous (1949-1950) Italian champions Juventus, who participated in Copa Rio. Also in 1951, for the first edition of the tournament, Mexican club Atlas requested participation and were denied, while the Indian Football Association requested the participation of a representative club and were also denied. Therefore, the final list of participants of the 1951 Copa Rio ended up being: Vasco da Gama (1950 Rio de Janeiro state champions), Palmeiras (1950 São Paulo state champions), Sporting CP (1950/51 Portuguese champions), Austria Wien (1949/50 Austrian champions), Nacional (1950 Uruguayan champions), Red Star (1951 Yugoslav champion), Juventus (1949/50 Italian champions) and OGC Nice (1950/51 French champions). The Rio de Janeiro, São Paulo, Portugal, Uruguay, Yugoslavia and France representatives were the reigning (the then current) champions of their leagues. Palmeiras won the 1951 Copa Rio.

In 1952, the Brazilian FA entitled Fluminense to organise the second edition of the tournament, as part of Fluminense's 50th anniversary celebrations (the second edition of the tournament was originally scheduled to 1953, but was advanced to 1952 for the aforementioned anniversary celebrations). In 1952, no British, Spanish, French or Italian clubs accepted the invitation to participate in Copa Rio: Juventus, AC Milan, Internazionale, Hibernian, Newcastle United, Manchester United, Barcelona, Real Madrid and Nice were all invited to participate in the 1952 Copa Rio, and all of them declined. As for Juventus, Barcelona and Nice, the three participated in the 1952 Latin Cup, which was held in dates close to the dates of Copa Rio, being that the supposed reason of their declination; as for Real Madrid, they prioritised participation in the 1952 Small Club World Cup, held in Caracas. Thus, Fluminense and the Brazilian FA invited teams from Argentina, Paraguay, Colombia, Switzerland and West Germany, which were not invited for the 1951 edition of the tournament. As for the Colombian invitee, Millonarios, they prioritised participation in the 1952 Small Club World Cup. In 1952 the Argentinian FA refused to allow its national champion Racing Club to participate in Copa Rio, while FC Nürnberg (West Germany) were prevented from participating in 1952 due to a West Germany 1950-1952 federal law prohibiting national clubs from participating in tournaments abroad (FC Saarbrücken took its berth, since that law did not apply to clubs from the Saar Protectorate due to political reasons). In 1952, Dinamo Zagreb (then Yugoslavia, presently Croatia) requested participation and were denied. Therefore, the final list of participants of the 1952 Copa Rio ended up being: Fluminense (1951 Rio de Janeiro state champions), Corinthians (1951 São Paulo state champions), Austria Wien (1951/52 Austrian runners-up), Grasshopper-Club (1951/52 Swiss champions), Libertad (1952 Paraguayan runners-up), Peñarol (1951 Uruguayan champions), Sporting CP (1951/52 Portuguese champions) and 1. FC Saarbrücken (1951/52 Southwest German champions and West German runners-up). The Rio de Janeiro, São Paulo, Portugal, Uruguay and Switzerland representatives were the reigning (the then current) champions of their leagues, while FC Saarbrücken were the reigning Southwest-Germany champions but lost the final match of the West German championship. Fluminense won the 1952 Copa Rio.

Both editions of the competition were contested between eight teams from Europe and South America, divided into two four-team groups, one in São Paulo and the other in Rio de Janeiro, with matches at Pacaembu stadium in São Paulo and Maracanã stadium in Rio de Janeiro.

=== Impact in Europe ===
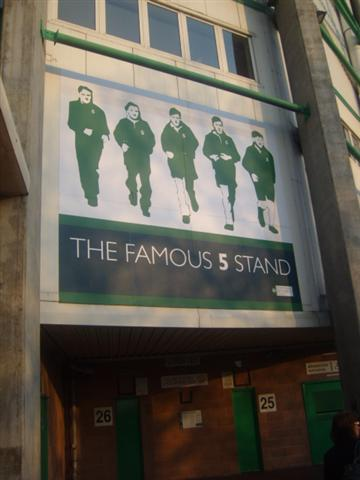
At Hibernian's Easter Road, a picture of The Famous Five, who were the main non-Brazilian players at the 1953 tournament. After declining to participate in the 1951 and 1952 Copa Rio, Scottish champions Hibernian participated in the 1953 cup, and the club refer to themselves as "the first British club to play in the World Club Championship tournament in 1953".

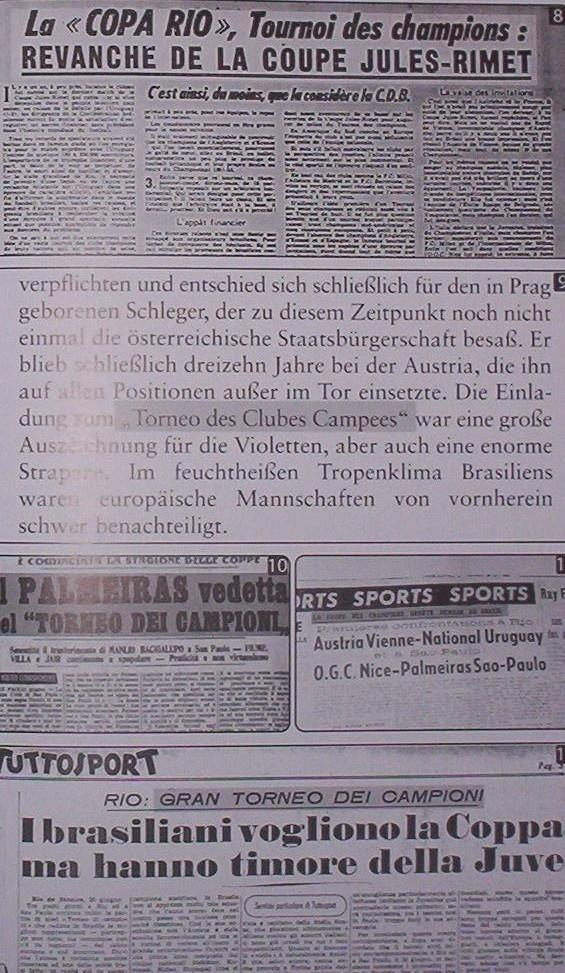
1951 European newspapers referring to Copa Rio as the "Champions Cup"

Among the six countries that would later on dominate European club football, as measured by UEFA Champions League conquests (England, Italy, Spain, Germany, Netherlands and Portugal), two of them were not invited to Copa Rio 1951, as Germany and Netherlands did not participate in the 1950 FIFA World Cup held in Brazil, bearing in mind that back then Netherlands was not yet seen as a relevant football powerhouse, and Germany was then excluded from international football due to the post-War, early Cold War political tension (as were then excluded from international football all the Iron Curtain Countries: Soviet Union, Poland, Hungary, Romania, Bulgaria and Czechoslovakia). It must be pointed out also that German and Dutch clubs declined participation in the Intercontinental Cup (IC) in the 1970s, perhaps indicating indifference in these countries for intercontinental club competitions. As for the British clubs, both English and Scottish clubs were invited to Copa Rio, having declined participation, and their indifference to play Copa Rio can be paralleled to their indifference to play the Intercontinental Cup in the 1970s or to play the FIFA World Cup in the 1930s.

As for the Latin European countries (Italy, France, Portugal and Spain), their clubs and national FAs entitled priority to the Latin Cup, created by Ottorino Barassi and Jules Rimet and organised jointly by the national associations of the four participating countries. As there was proximity of dates between Copa Rio and the Latin Cup (and the European clubs were obliged to grant vacation to their footballers after the end of the European season), 2 clubs in 1951 (AC Milan and Atlético Madrid) and 3 in 1952 (Barcelona, Juventus and Nice) declined participation in Copa Rio supposedly in order to prioritise the Latin Cup. This can be compared to the fact that, later on, European clubs would entitle to the UEFA Champions League much more importance than entitled to the Intercontinental Cup and the FIFA Club World Cup. Differently from the others, in 1951 French champions Nice prioritised Copa Rio and relinquished their berth in the Latin Cup to French runners-up Lille, and Sporting CP played both the Latin Cup and the Copa Rio every year (1951 and 1952, and also Copa Rio's 1953 successor tournament).

It must be pointed out that, as a competition organised by the Brazilian FA, participation in Copa Rio was non-compulsory for non-Brazilian clubs; the case being different from the IC from the 1980s onwards and the FCWC, in which participation of the UEFA Champions League club champion was compulsory under UEFA and FIFA rules (as an example, Barcelona considered the possibility of not participating in the 1992 IC, and the contractual obligation with UEFA weighed in for its decision to participate). One Spanish club declined participation in the 1952 Copa Rio in order to play Pequeña Copa del Mundo in Caracas: Real Madrid CF.

In Italy, the only European country that had been champion of the FIFA World Cup by 1951, the 1951 tournament was hailed enthusiastically: the Italian press regarded the competition as an "impressive project" that "was greeted so enthusiastically by FIFA officials Stanley Rous and Jules Rimet to the extent of almost giving it an official FIFA stamp;" Describing Juventus's acceptance to participate in the 1951 tournament, the Italian press stated that "an Italian club could not be missing in such an important and worldwide-reaching event". Giampiero Boniperti, Juventus's main star at Copa Rio 1951 (thus, the main European star in the competition), declared, in a 2007 interview to Placar, that he and his teammates played Copa Rio 1951 seeing it as the legitimate Club World Cup.

In at least five European countries (Switzerland, Austria, Spain, Portugal, and Italy), the competition was hailed as either "Club World Championship/Cup" or simply as "Champions Cup".

=== Impact in South America ===
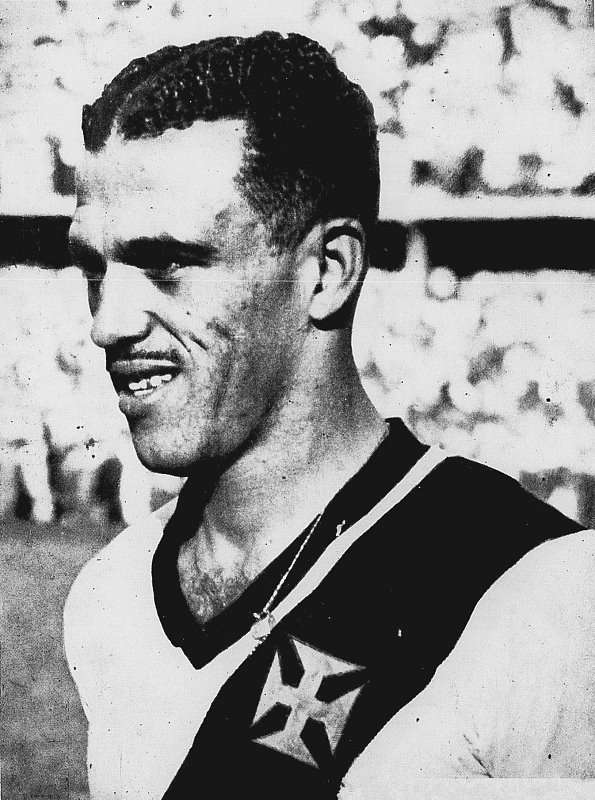
Jair da Rosa Pinto, who played the 1950 FIFA World Cup with Brazil and the 1951 Copa Rio with Palmeiras, said: "in 1951 I got to be what I hadn't gotten to be in 1950: Football World Champion"

In 1951, the whole Brazilian press (all of the 15 Brazilian newspapers that have been researched on the issue) hailed the competition as the "World Champions Cup". In 1951 Vasco da Gama cancelled a trip to Europe in order to play in the Copa Rio, and in 1953 Vasco da Gama declined the invitation to play the 1953 "Pequeña Copa del Mundo" in order to play the 1953 Copa Rio-successor-tournament. The reigning Uruguayan champion participated in both editions of Copa Rio, what can be interpreted as a sign of the competition's prestige in that country, the only South American one that had been champion of the FIFA World Cup by 1951. Moreover, the Uruguayan League was interrupted in 1951 in order to allow for its reigning champion Club Nacional de Football to participate in Copa Rio, and in the same year the Uruguayan FA proposed to the Brazilian FA that Uruguay should host the 2nd edition of the tournament. However, in 1952 Uruguayan club Peñarol withdrew from the Copa Rio in their semi-final second leg match, resulting in a walkover forfeiture against Corinthians, citing "lack of security" after their first semi-final match ended in a brawl. One South American club declined participation in the 1952 Copa Rio in order to play Pequeña Copa del Mundo in Caracas: Millonarios F.C.

== Degradation ==
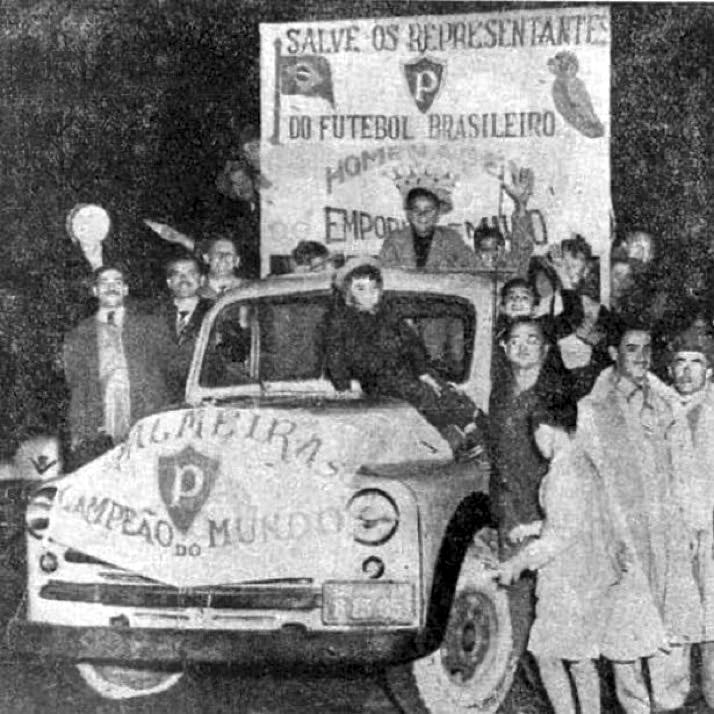
Celebration of the 1951 conquest by Palmeiras. The flag on the car reads "Palmeiras, World Champion"

Already in 1951, the competition received criticism in the Brazilian press, as the quality of participants ended up being far below the original plan, as many European clubs were invited and declined participation. Among the European countries originally envisaged to be represented in Copa Rio, Portugal was chosen in order to please the huge Portuguese-Brazilian community, not due to football-based criteria. Among the 4 European countries originally envisaged to be represented in Copa Rio due to their footballing force (Italy, Spain, England, Scotland), only one (Italy) was represented in the 1951 Copa Rio, and their representative club (Juventus) were not the reigning national champions (AC Milan were the reigning Italian champions).

On the verge of the 1951 Copa Rio, Brazilian newspaper O Estado de São Paulo published an article stating that the following editions of the cup should be called neither a "World" nor a "Champion Clubs" cup, for it merited neither labels. The same newspaper also sustained that competitions such as Copa Rio should ideally be organised by FIFA, in dates set and announced by FIFA in due advance, as there was the perception that the dates set by the Brazilian FA for Copa Rio did not fit the interest of the European clubs, thus resulting in a number of them declining to participate. As the final list of the 1951 participants turned out to be not of the same quality of the original plan, this fact was also criticized by the Italian press; as an example, Vittorio Pozzo wrote an article criticising Copa Rio for not featuring representatives of Argentina, Scotland and England (the Brazilian newspaper Jornal dos Sports criticised him back, stating that the 1934 and 1938 World Cups won by Italy under Pozzo's guidance did not feature Uruguay, Scotland and England either). Italian newspaper Corriere dello Sport stated in 1951 that, after the declination of Spanish, English and Scottish clubs to participate in Copa Rio, the competition "was reduced to an ad inviti cup". ("a cup by invitation", apparently meaning a cup without well-defined qualification criteria).

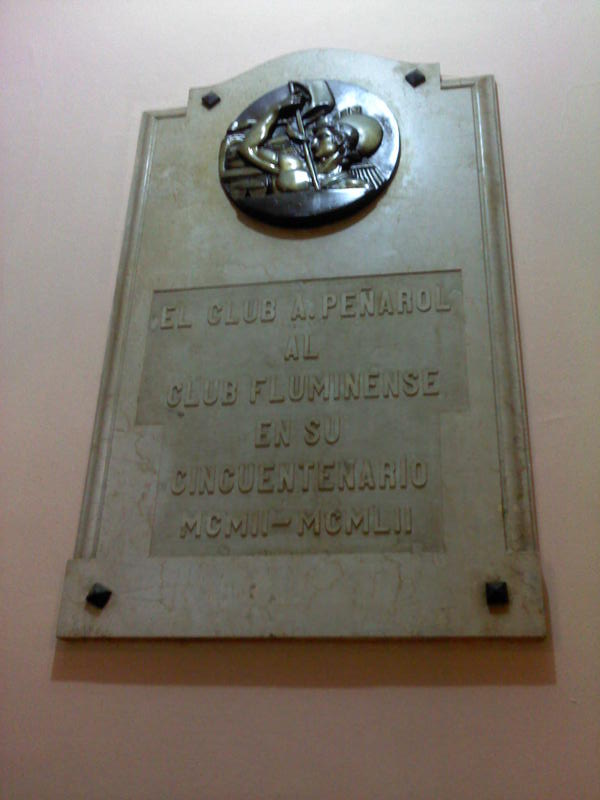
Peñarol's gift to Fluminense for their 50th anniversary. The 1952 Copa Rio was organized by Fluminense for their semicentennial celebrations

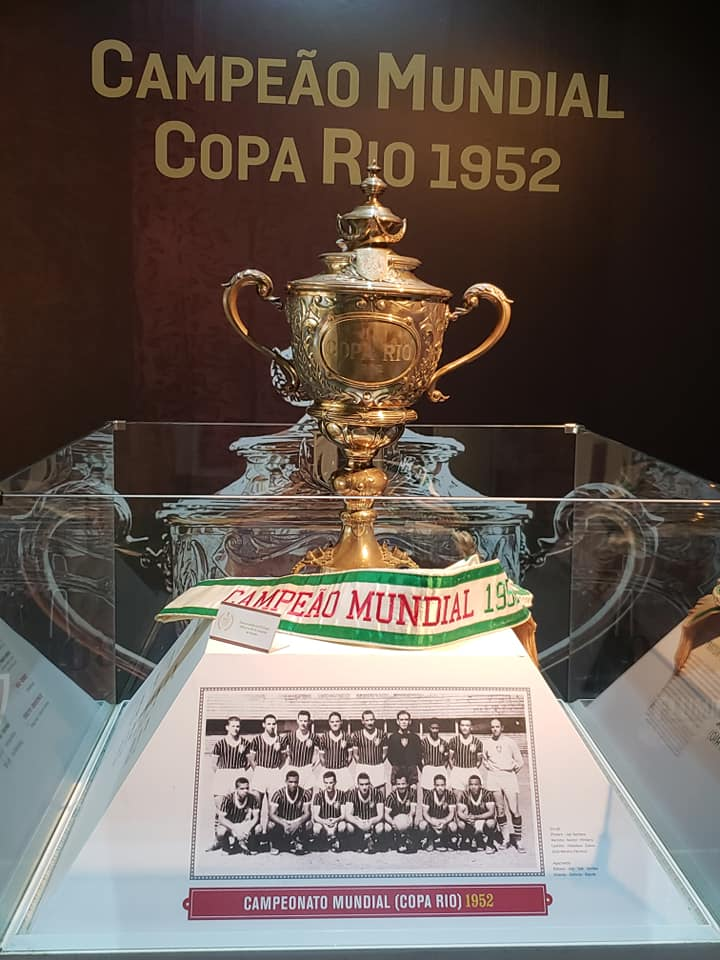
1952 Copa Rio trophy, at Fluminense's trophy room, with the placard "Campeão Mundial" (World Champions)

Therefore, in June 1951, the Brazilian FA announced that the following editions of the competition (after the 1951 one) were to be hailed only as Taça Rio, or Copa Rio (Portuguese for Rio Cup), without the label "World Champions Cup" any more. Besides, as for the 1952 Copa Rio, O Estado de São Paulo published an article on the brink of the competition, stating that Uruguayan Peñarol was the only really valuable of the 6 foreign participants; for among the 4 European countries originally envisaged to be represented in Copa Rio due to their footballing force (Italy, Spain, England, Scotland), none was represented in the 1952 Copa Rio.

Probably as a consequence of these facts, only 3 Brazilian newspapers (amongst 15 researched) referred to the 1952 edition as being the "World Champions Cup" (compared to all of 15 Brazilian newspapers researched on the 1951 edition): these were Mário Filho's Jornal dos Sports, Última Hora (also connected to Mário Filho, as his brother headed the sports section) and Diário - Minas Gerais (soon after the 1952 cup, Mário Filho wrote an article being sorry that the Brazilian audience regarded the 1952 Copa Rio as being of a lower technical level compared to the 1951 one, and being sorry that, while in 1951 Palmeiras hailed themselves as club world champions after winning Copa Rio, Fluminense did not regard their 1952 conquest in the same manner).

== Extinction and successor tournaments ==
According to the Estado de São Paulo newspaper, due to the difficulties in bringing strong European sides to compete in Brazil, the CBD (Brazilian Sports Confederation - then the Brazilian FA) decided that its 1953 intercontinental competition should feature four Brazilian clubs and four foreign clubs, rather than six foreign sides. The organisation of the 1953 competition, the Torneio Octogonal Rivadavia Correa Meyer, followed this decision; however, the Uruguayan Football Association prohibited Nacional from participating due to the close scheduling of the Uruguayan domestic league, and the club was replaced by Brazilian side Fluminense, as there was not enough time to search for a foreign substitute; after the said Uruguayan withdrawal, both Fluminense and Flamengo demanded the berth, and the Brazilian FA gave it to Fluminense, due to Fluminense's position in the Torneio Rio-São Paulo. Thus the competition ended up including five Brazilian sides and three foreign sides. The 1953 competition also saw some clubs being invited and declining to participate. Rot-Weiss Essen (West Germany) and Partizan (from Belgrade, Serbia, then Yugoslavia) were invited and accepted to participate but were then uninvited by the Brazilian Sports Confederation. In the case of Rot-Weiss Essen, their invitation followed their German Cup win, and the un-invitation followed a 4–0 defeat in a friendly match in Essen against America (not viewed in Brazil as a top club). Rot-Weiss Essen sued the CBD for financial compensation, taking the case to FIFA (the results of the case are unknown). Despite the competition's new name and different number of domestic and foreign clubs, some sources (1953 editions of both O Estado de S. Paulo and Mundo Deportivo) referred to the 1953 competition as the same tournament of 1951–52, while other sources (RSSSF and 1953 editions of the Jornal do Brasil) treated it as a successor tournament. (Note: The sources are available only in Portuguese and Spanish languages and are available on Portuguese language Wikipedia articles on the subject.) Therefore, the final list of participants of the 1953 tournament ended up being: Botafogo (second-best placed among Rio de Janeiro teams in the Torneio Rio-São Paulo), Fluminense (third-best placed among Rio de Janeiro teams in the Torneio Rio-São Paulo, entering the berth left open by the withdrawal of Nacional), Vasco da Gama (best placed among Rio de Janeiro teams in the Torneio Rio-São Paulo), Corinthians (best placed among São Paulo teams in the Torneio Rio-São Paulo), São Paulo (second-best placed among São Paulo teams in the Torneio Rio-São Paulo), Olimpia (runners-up of the Paraguayan Championship in 1953), Hibernian (Scottish Champions) and Sporting CP (reigning Portuguese Champions). The 1953 competition was won by Vasco da Gama, from Rio de Janeiro. The main European attraction of the 1953 cup was Hibernian, a club that, as Scottish champions, were among the first to be invited to both editions of Copa Rio (1951-1952), and had declined on both occasions. That Hibernian line-up was famous for their "The Famous Five", and nowadays the club refer to their participation in the 1953 cup as being "the first British club to play in the World Club Championship tournament in 1953". The other European participant was Sporting CP, a club that, as in 1951 and 1952, in 1953 played both the Latin Cup and the Brazilian FA's international club competition.

Also in 1953, the Uruguayan FA launched their own worldwide club cup, based on Copa Rio, and named Copa Montevideo, having been played in Uruguay in 1953 and 1954, won respectively by Nacional and Peñarol, with each edition featuring 6 South American clubs and only 2 European ones. The 1953 edition featured Nacional (its eventual champions), Peñarol, Botafogo, First Vienna, Fluminense, Colo Colo, Dinamo Zagreb and Presidente Hayes, and the 1954 one featured Peñarol (its eventual champions), Nacional, Fluminense, America, Rapid Wien, Alianza Lima, Norrköping and Sportivo Luqueño.

In 1955, the Brazilian FA organised another international club competition, the Torneio Internacional Charles Miller, with 4 Brazilian clubs (Corinthians, Flamengo, Palmeiras, America), and only 2 foreign clubs, SL Benfica (Portugal) and Peñarol (Uruguay). The competition was won by Corinthians, and played in 1955, the same year of the inaugural edition of the European Cup, which would go on to become the top priority of the European clubs, thus definitely burying the hopes of the Brazilian FA to create an intercontinental club cup with meaningful European participation. Therefore, in 1955 the Brazilian FA decided to stop organising intercontinental club competitions altogether. In communication to journalist Janos Lengyel in 1955, published in Brazilian newspaper Diário da Noite, Ottorino Barassi provided his opinion on why the Brazilian FA failed to attract the most important European clubs to compete in Brazil: "as long as we (meaning: Brazilians, the Brazilian FA) insist upon creating an international cup by scheduling its beginning for the dates that best fit us; as long as we establish by ourselves the technical-financial conditions of this cup; and just after all of that is decided, go looking for European clubs that accept to participate in the cup; as long as it so happens, we will have great difficulties. The right way, in case the Brazilian FA wants to keep regularly organising international cups in Brazil, is the following: establish in advance the countries whose champions or top clubs should be included in the cup; establish the right time basis of the cup (establish if the cup should be held every 2 years, or every 4 years); gather together representatives of the countries which were to be included; and then establish the dates and all the conditions of participation in the cup. Therefore, all the interested parts (all the interested national football associations) would be aware, in advance, that their champion clubs (their champion club or whatever club should be elected) should go to Brazil in appropriate moment, without the need of desperate démarches that always have little chance of success (meaning: desperate démarches of the Brazilian FA to try to bring European clubs to compete in Brazil). And such a cup would have the blessing and all guarantees from FIFA, what would ensure its follow-through, perfect under the managerial point of view." Ottorino Barassi's 1955 words resonate for example the Latin Cup, organised jointly by the national FAs of all the 4 participating countries.

The 1951 edition of Copa Rio was one of the "champions cups" organised by clubs or national football associations, before the 1955 onset of the European Cup, other pre-1955 examples being Copa Aldao, Coupe des Nations, South American Championship of Champions and Latin Cup. In May 1955, FIFA agreed to recognise the European Cup as an official competition only provided that UEFA was its organiser. Thenceforth, international club competitions organised uniquely by clubs and national football associations (not by continental confederations such as UEFA), such as Copa Rio, would decline in importance, being either extinguished or regarded as merely friendly cups. One attempt was made in 1960 in the USA to create a Club World Cup along the lines of Copa Rio: the International Soccer League. However, in 1960 the Intercontinental Cup came into existence as a UEFA/CONMEBOL-endorsed "best club of the world" contest, overshadowing the International Soccer League or any other attempt at creating another "club world cup", until the creation of the FIFA Club World Cup in 2000 and its merger with the Intercontinental Cup in 2005.

== Status of the 1951 edition of Copa Rio as a Club World Cup ==
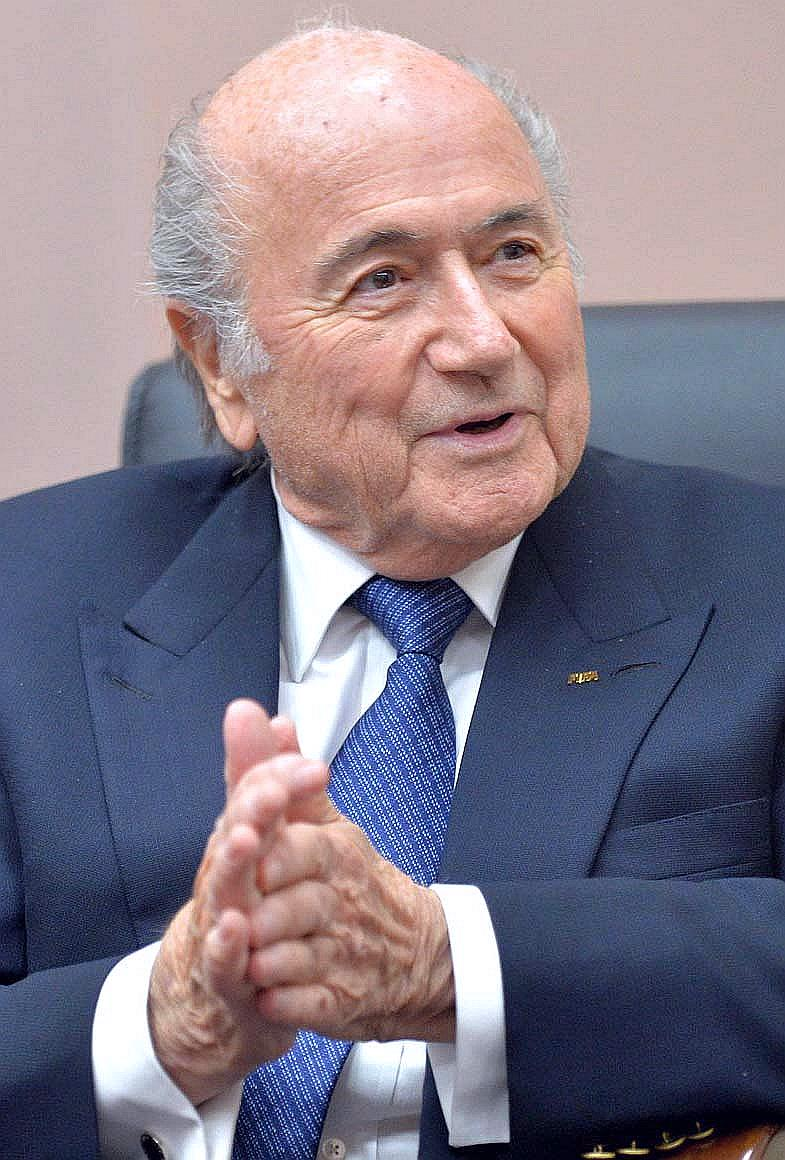
Former FIFA president Sepp Blatter has stated to the Brazilian press that, during his tenure in office, FIFA effectively awarded recognition to the 1951 Copa Rio as a legitimate Club World Cup, and therefore to Palmeiras as Club World Champions, a statement that has been disputed by his successor Gianni Infantino

The status of the competition as a "club world cup" is heatedly debated in Brazil, as both the 1951 winning club Palmeiras and the 1952 winning club Fluminense regard themselves as the first ever club football world champions. A number of requests for official FIFA recognition, or acknowledgment (thenceforth the expressions "recognition"/"recognise" will be used in this text), of Copa Rio as an officially recognized "club world champions-crowning" tournament have been made to FIFA, primarily by 1951 Copa Rio winners Palmeiras and the Brazilian FA (nowadays named CBF- Confederação Brasileira de Futebol). Since 2007, the issue has turned into a matter of controversy: on the one hand, Copa Rio was unquestionably created in order to determine the "club world champions" and Palmeiras was celebrated in this manner in Brazil in 1951 (as proved by the 1951 Brazilian newspapers); on the other hand, the competition fell short of the aim of representing the best of European and South American football, as can be seen through the list of clubs that were invited and declined to participate.

In 2006, Palmeiras prepared a document for FIFA, detailedly describing the 1951 Copa Rio, in order to request official confirmation of their conquest as the first ever club football world championship. The document sustained that the participation of FIFA officials Stanley Rous and Ottorino Barassi in the organisation of the 1951 competition was a clear indication of FIFA's blessing to it in 1951, sustaining that FIFA had assigned Barassi to represent FIFA in the organisation of the tournament (in reality, in a 1951 interview, the FIFA president Jules Rimet, while praising the Brazilian initiative for Copa Rio, denied any FIFA involvement or responsibility for it). Rous and Barassi were primarily involved in negotiations with European clubs, while Barassi also helped organize the framework of the competition, having been present in Brazil several times in 1951, for example for the cup final match. Barassi was involved in the recruiting of European clubs also in 1952, and also in its 1953 successor-tournament, though only through telephone contact, with no evidence that he came to Brazil personally in 1952 and 1953, as he did several times for the 1951 edition.

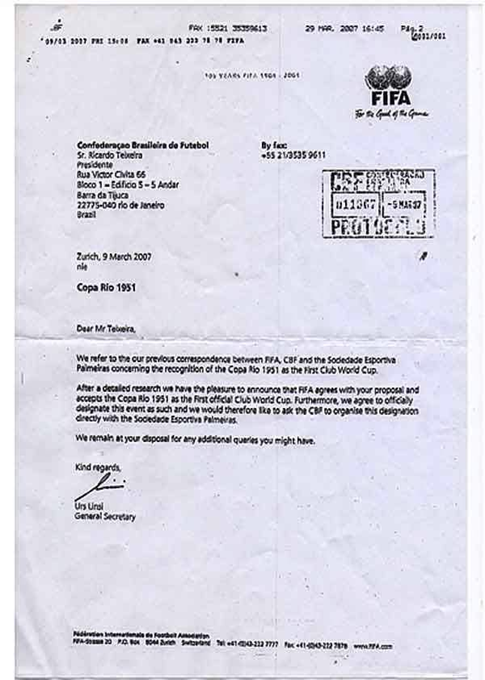
The 2007 fax by FIFA Secretary-General Urs Linsi to the then president of the Brazilian FA, Ricardo Teixeira, referring to the 1951 edition of Copa Rio as the first official Club World Cup

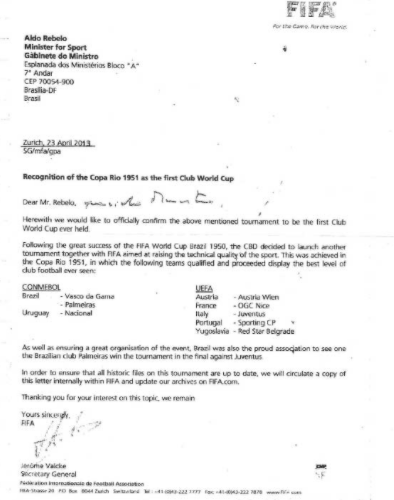
The 2013 fax by FIFA Secretary-General Jérôme Valcke to the then Brazilian Minister of Sports, Aldo Rebelo, referring to the 1951 edition of Copa Rio as "the first Club World Cup ever held"

In May 2007, Palmeiras received a letter from FIFA, signed by then Secretary-General Urs Linsi, recognizing Palmeiras as club world champions of 1951. However, this decision was later withdrawn by FIFA president Sepp Blatter, who declared that the matter was still being evaluated. On 26 April, FIFA announced that the proceedings to make this decision had not been completed yet, and that the issue had been dealt with only at administrative level, by the General-Secretariat, though, given the importance of the matter, it should be submitted to the FIFA Executive Committee.

In December 2007, FIFA declared that the first Club World Cup was played in Brazil in 2000, thus not recognizing Copa Rio as an official FIFA event. The clarification that Copa Rio was not an official FIFA event happened as the presence of Ottorino Barassi in the 1951 Copa Rio Organising Committee was understood to be a sign of FIFA endorsement (at least a de facto endorsement) to Copa Rio in 1951.

In April 2013, in communication to then Brazilian Minister of Sports, Aldo Rebelo, then FIFA General-Secretary, Jérôme Valcke, stated that FIFA recognised Palmeiras as champions of the "first Club World Cup ever held" (as written in the document).

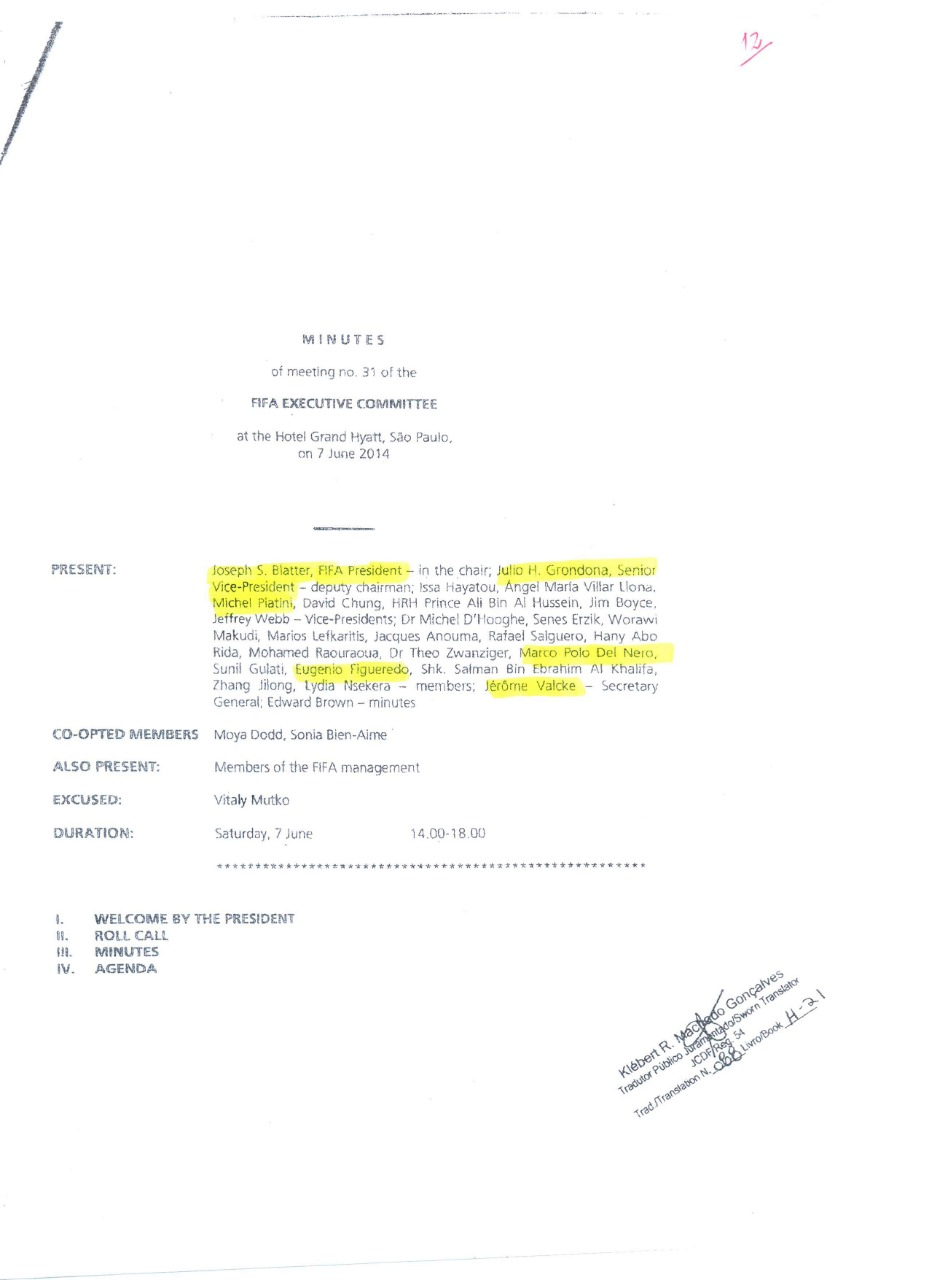
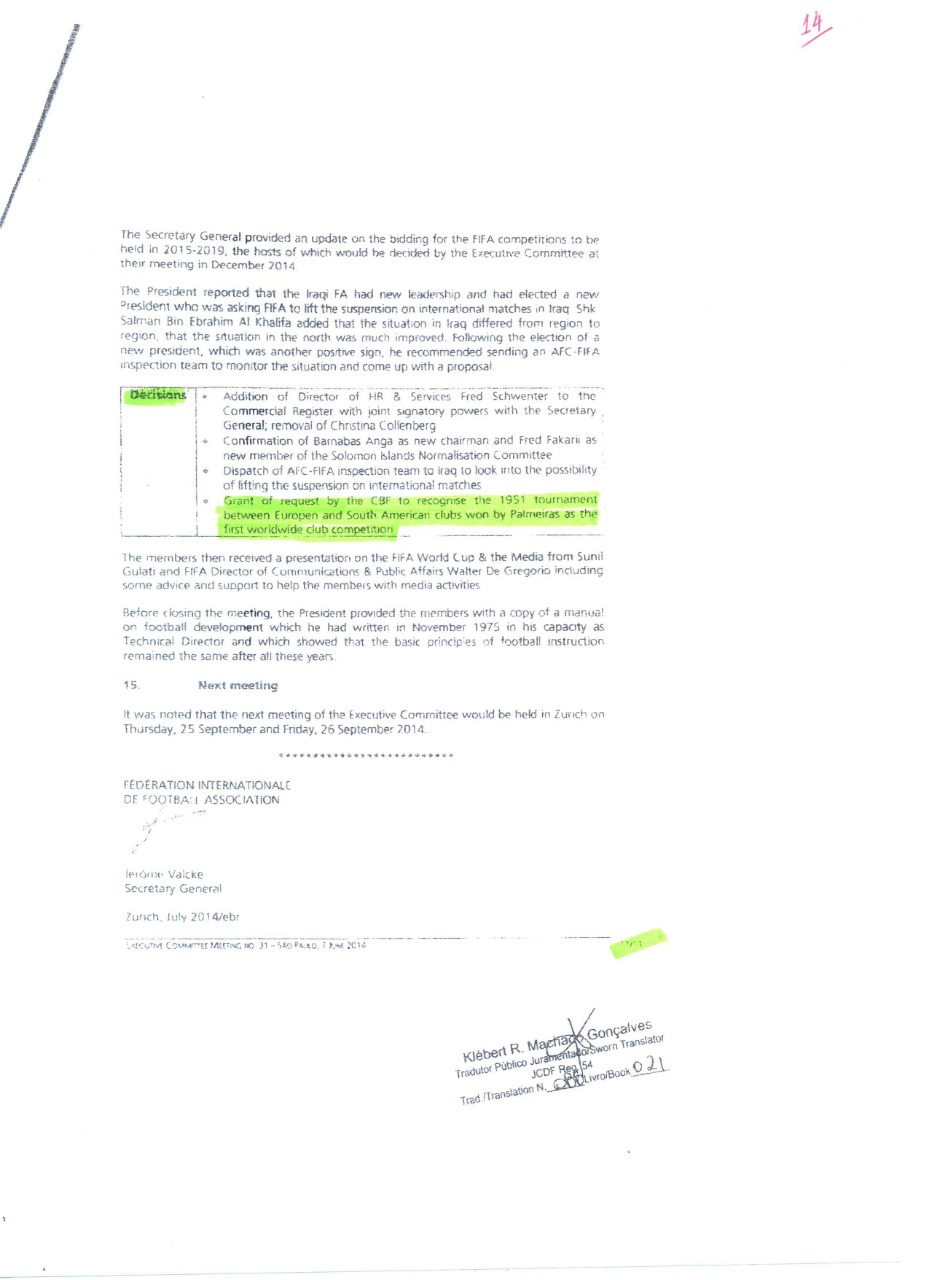
Minutes of the São Paulo FIFA Executive Committee meeting on June 7th 2014, with the approval of Copa Rio as the first worldwide club tournament. The use of the word worldwide instead of world sparked controversy in Brazil on the meaning of the decision

In 2014, the FIFA Executive Committee recognized Palmeiras as champions of the "first worldwide club competition" (as written in the document). Also in 2014, FIFA president Joseph Blatter stated to the Brazilian press that Palmeiras's 1951 conquest has effectively been recognised by FIFA and thus Palmeiras should be regarded as club world champions. A week after Blatter's statement, FIFA stated to the Brazilian press that the FIFA Executive Committee "agreed to recognise the 1951 cup as the first club cup at world level".

On 22 July 2016, FIFA celebrated the 65-year anniversary of the 1951 Copa Rio won by Palmeiras. On instagram, FIFA posted: "Green is the color of envy. 'The Big Green' were the envy of the wide world # On this day 65 years ago. A Liminha-inspired Palmeiras edged a Juventus team including Giampiero Boniperti & a Danish triumvirate to become the sport's first intercontinental world club champions. 100,000 watched that at the Maracanã. One million flooded the streets of São Paulo to welcome their heroes home". (as written in the post).

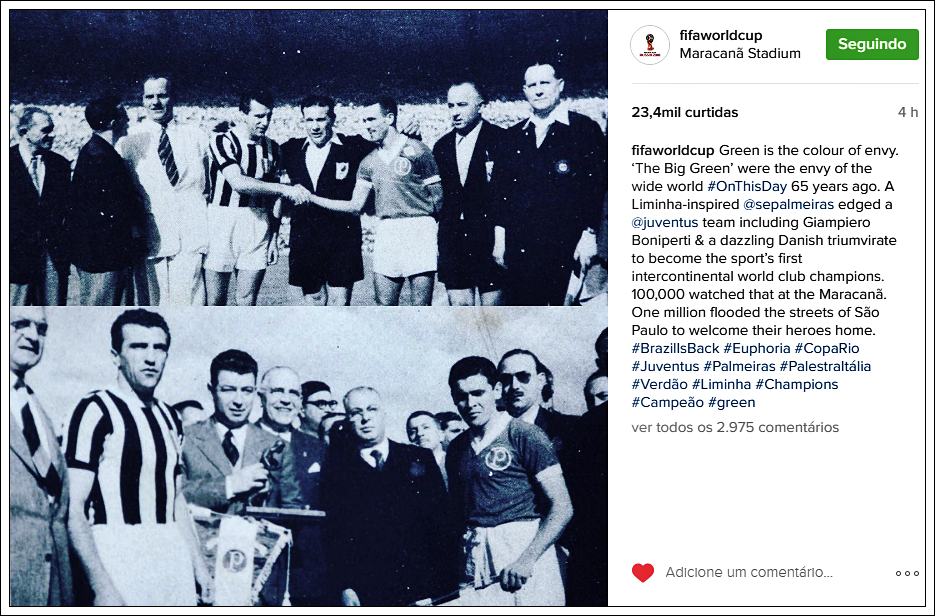
In 2016, FIFA made a publication on Instagram referring to Palmeiras as "1951 world club champions"

A distinction between a "worldwide competition" (worldwide in reach but that does not necessarily indicate the world champion) and a "competition awarding the label of world champion" rose in January 2017, when FIFA issued the following statement, whereby FIFA mentioned the 1951 Copa Rio jointly with competitions (the 1952 Copa Rio and the Intercontinental Cup) that theretofore had never been the subject of a decision by the FIFA Executive Committee, citing them as examples (by using the expression such as) of competitions whose existence FIFA hailed as positive: "At its meeting in Sao Paulo on 7 June 2014 the FIFA Executive Committee agreed to the request presented by CBF to acknowledge the 1951 tournament between European and South American clubs as the first worldwide club competition, and Palmeiras as its winner. FIFA acknowledges and values the initiatives to establish worldwide club competitions throughout history. This is the case of tournaments involving European and South American clubs, such as the pioneering Copa Rio, played in 1951 and 1952, and the Intercontinental Cup. However, it was not until 2000 that FIFA organised the maiden FIFA Club World Cup, with representatives from all six confederations. The winners of this competition, which went on to be staged annually from 2005 onwards, are the ones officially considered by FIFA as club world champions. The aforementioned 2017 FIFA statement rose the question if the expression "first worldwide club competition" (used in the document of the 2014 meeting of the FIFA Executive Committee on the recognition of the 1951 Copa Rio) meant the equivalent of a "Club World Cup", or meant merely a club cup worldwide in reach but without indicating the club world champions (e.g.: the UEFA Europa League is a European-wide club cup but does not indicate the European Champions).

In October 2017 FIFA changed its long-standing position on the Intercontinental Cup, and has officially recognised (with official FIFA Council approval) all its champions (from 1960 to 2004) as club world champions. Both Intercontinental Cup and FIFA Club World Cup winners are listed as club world champions in the FIFA Club World Cup Statistical Kit, FIFA's then official document on its club world competition, with the aforementioned recognition being expressly mentioned in all annual editions of the aforementioned document since 2017. Copa Rio has never been mentioned in this document since its supposed FIFA-recognition in 2014, prompting controversy in Brazil on the extent to which FIFA recognised, or did not recognise, Copa Rio.

In April 2019, FIFA president Gianni Infantino, interviewed by the Brazilian media, reiterated the perspective that only the winners of the Intercontinental Cup and the FIFA Club World Cup are officially recognised as club world champions: "We have (the FIFA) already decided to give the title of world champion to everyone who has won the Cup between Europe and South America since 1960. 1951 is a little further back"; "The world title of Palmeiras... For miracles, you need ask another, not me...". Also in April 2019, former FIFA president Joseph Blatter (who held office until December 2015) stated to the Brazilian press that Palmeiras has been effectively recognised by FIFA in 2014 and thus should be regarded as club world champions.

On the verge of Palmeiras's first match at the 2021 FIFA Club World Cup, FIFA published, on its web-site, a text on Palmeiras's history. On the 1951 Copa Rio, the text read: Global glory for 'The Big Green': A world championship had been dreamed of and discussed for years by some of football’s foremost shot-callers – Jules Rimet, Ottorino Barassi and Stanley Rous among them – and was finally scheduled for 1951 in Brazil, which had recently hosted the FIFA World Cup. The eight-team competition involved some of Europe’s top teams, Uruguayan behemoths Nacional and Brazilian duo Vasco da Gama and Palmeiras, who qualified as Rio-Sao Paulo Tournament winners. The favourites were Juventus, who boasted an exceptional attack featuring Karl Aage Hansen, Karl Aage Praest, John Hansen and Giampiero Boniperti, and Vasco, who supplied eight members of Brazil’s World Cup squad the previous year. The duo’s status as favourites was strengthened in the group stage, with the Carioca colossuses thrashing Sporting Lisbon and Austria Vienna 5-1 and the Turin titans thumping Palmeiras 4-0. The Paulista powerhouses, however, had other ideas and, brushing aside injury blows, beat Vasco 2-1 over 180 minutes in the semi-finals and stunned Juve 1-0 in the first leg of the final. Rio de Janeiro was packed on the day of the decider, with a reported 10,000 Italians cramming into its hotels, certain Juventus would emerge triumphant. Yet Liminha, a 21-year-old who had begun the tournament on the bench, helped set up the first equaliser and scored a late, title-clinching goal in a 2-2 draw in front of over 100,000 at the Maracana.

FIFA mentioned both editions of Copa Rio, 1951-1952, as "Inter-Confederations Cups" in the official guide of the 2025 FIFA Club World Cup, also mentioning several other competitions under the label "Inter-Confederations Cups", such as the Intercontinental Cup, the FIFA Club World Cup, the FIFA Intercontinental Cup, the Interamerican Cup and the Afro-Asian Club Championship, the latter two being competitions that have never been hailed as club world honours. However, FIFA later removed the aforementioned document.

Brazilian clubs Fluminense and Corinthians declared in 2007 that they would follow suit in case Palmeiras was successful about the 1951 Copa Rio recognition-request, and therefore they would ask FIFA recognition for their titles of 1952 (Fluminense's Copa Rio) and 1953 (Corinthians's Pequeña Copa del Mundo), with other clubs following suit later on (Bangu's 1960 ISL, Botafogo's Caracas trophies 1967–1970), thus prompting speculation that a possible FIFA recognition of Copa Rio 1951 as a Club World Cup might propel other clubs to make similar "recognition requests" for other competitions, thus creating a "free-for-all" of requests, mainly on competitions held in the 1950s, before the onset of the Intercontinental Cup in 1960 as a UEFA/CONMEBOL-endorsed "best club of the world" contest. These are often cited in Brazil as explanations for Palmeiras's failure to achieve recognition for Copa Rio 1951 in the same full-fledged manner in which FIFA recognised the Intercontinental Cup as a Club World Cup.

== List of champions ==
| Year | Champion | Runner-up | 1st leg | 2nd leg | Venue |
|---|---|---|---|---|---|
| 1951 | (Brazil) Palmeiras | (Italy) Juventus | 1–0 | 2–2 | Maracanã Stadium |
| 1952 | (Brazil) Fluminense | (Brazil) Corinthians | 2–0 | 2–2 | Maracanã Stadium |

== See also ==
- Intercontinental Cup (1960–2004)
- FIFA Club World Cup
- FIFA Intercontinental Cup
