= Mário Filho =

Brazilian journalist and writer

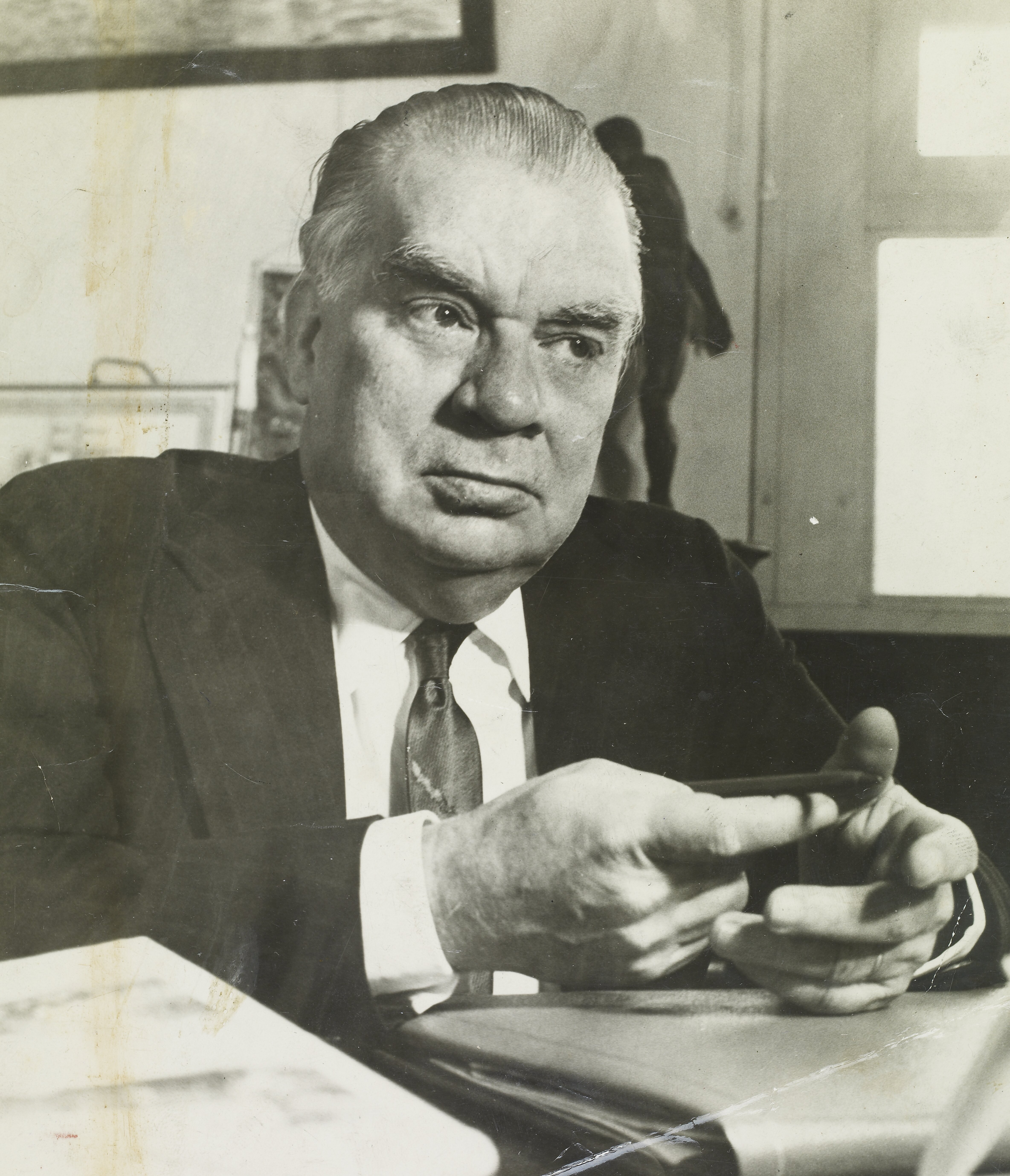
- Filho in 1964
- Born: Mário Rodrigues Filho; 3 June 1908; Recife, Brazil
- Died: 17 September 1966 (aged 58); Rio de Janeiro, Brazil
- Occupations: Sports journalist; Writer
- Spouse: Célia Rodrigues (m. 1926)

Mário Rodrigues Filho, better known as Mário Filho (3 June 1908 – 17 September 1966), was a Brazilian journalist and writer.

Born in the Pernambuco state capital Recife, Filho moved to Rio de Janeiro while still a child, in 1916. His father, Mário Rodrigues, owned the newspaper "A Manhã" (lit. 'The Morning'). The younger Mário began at his father's paper in 1926 as a sports reporter, pursuing a relatively undeveloped form of journalism.

== Life ==
Mário Filho was born in Recife, capital of Northeast Brazilian state of Pernambuco, in 1908. He was the son of Mário Rodrigues, a journalist of the local daily Diário de Pernambuco. After conflicts with political opponents, the family moved in 1912 to the then capital of Brazil, Rio de Janeiro.

Mário Filho began his career as a reporter for the daily newspaper A Manhã in Rio, which was then in possession of his father. By 1926 he had specialized in sports. Filho was himself an ardent follower of football, which had established itself in Brazil since the turn of the century, and filled with reporting on all sides, which was uncommon in those days. In the second paper of his father Crítica, founded in November 1928, he revolutionized football coverage. He reported in detail on players and matches and made use of it as a language, the same language also was made use of by the fans. The myth of the derbies phase between the leading football teams of Rio Fluminense and Flamengo is also attributed to him, to be co-founded. Even the term Fla–Flu goes back to him.

After the death of his father, Mário Filho led Crítica together with his brother Milton. The paper came to an end after it was on the wrong side in the Revolution of 1930 and its premises were destroyed on 24 October 1930. In 1931 he founded O Mundo Sportivo, the first magazine in Brazil dedicated to sports, whose existence though was quite brief. In 1931 he joined the newspaper O Globo, where he later worked with the media mogul Roberto Marinho, with whom he also often played snooker.

In 1932 he founded the annual competition for the samba schools of Rio de Janeiro, the Desfile das Escolas de Samba - now one of the main tourist attractions of the city. This was originally intended as a stopgap, because Mundo Sportivo lost readership strongly between the relatively few and short football competitions. The actual idea for this, however is attributed to the journalist Carlos Pimentel working for the paper.

In 1936, he took over from Roberto Marinho at the Jornal dos Sports, often called JSports. JSports inspired the introduction of other sporting events, such as the Jogos da Primavera ("Spring Games") for women's sport, and football competitions for youth teams. Outstanding contribution was made in 1950 for the resumption of the Torneio Rio-São Paulo between the leading clubs of the two states. In the late 1940s, Mário Filho was involved with the Jornal dos Sports initiative for building the main stadium of the Football World Cup 1950 not in Jacarepaguá about 20 kilometres west of central Rio, but in the relatively central neighbourhood Maracanã on the then orphaned grounds of the racecourse of Derby Clube. Its main adversary was the journalist and councilor Carlos Lacerda, later aspirant for president and governor of the state of Guanabara. Also in 1951, Copa Rio, a kind of Club World Cup, was launched based on an idea by Filho.

Mário Filho also appeared as the author of several books in publication. In 1947, his book O negro no futebol brasileiro ("The Negro in Brazilian football") was published and is still considered a classic of Brazilian sports literature. In it, he describes the rise of the first black stars like Arthur Friedenreich, Leônidas da Silva and Domingos da Guia. Posthumously published in 1994, Sapo de Arubinha ("The toad of Arubinha") is a collection of articles by Filho documenting the Brazilian football in the first half of the 20th century.

Mário Filho died in 1966 at the age of 58 due to a heart attack, leaving behind his wife Célia, whom he had met on the beach of Copacabana and married at the age of 18 years. Célia committed suicide just a few months after his death. In his honor, the old Municipal Stadium Maracanã was named Journalist Mário Filho Stadium. As early as the 1950s, he let the readers of Journal dos Sports know, that his heart beat for Fluminense

The great playwright and chronicler Nelson Rodrigues, brother of Mario Filho, honored him with the name "o criador das multidões", "the creator of crowds". The term has stuck.

== Bibliography ==
- Bonecas (1927)
- Senhorita 1950 (1928)
- Copa Rio Branco (1932)
- Histórias do Flamengo (1945)
- O Negro no Futebol Brasileiro (1947)
- Romance do Football (1949)
- Copa do Mundo de 62 (1962)
- Viagem em Torno de Pelé (1964)
- O Rosto (1965)
- Infância de Portinari (1966)
- Sapo de Arubinha (Crônicas reunidas - 1994)
