= Ottorino Barassi =

Italian football administrator (1898–1971)

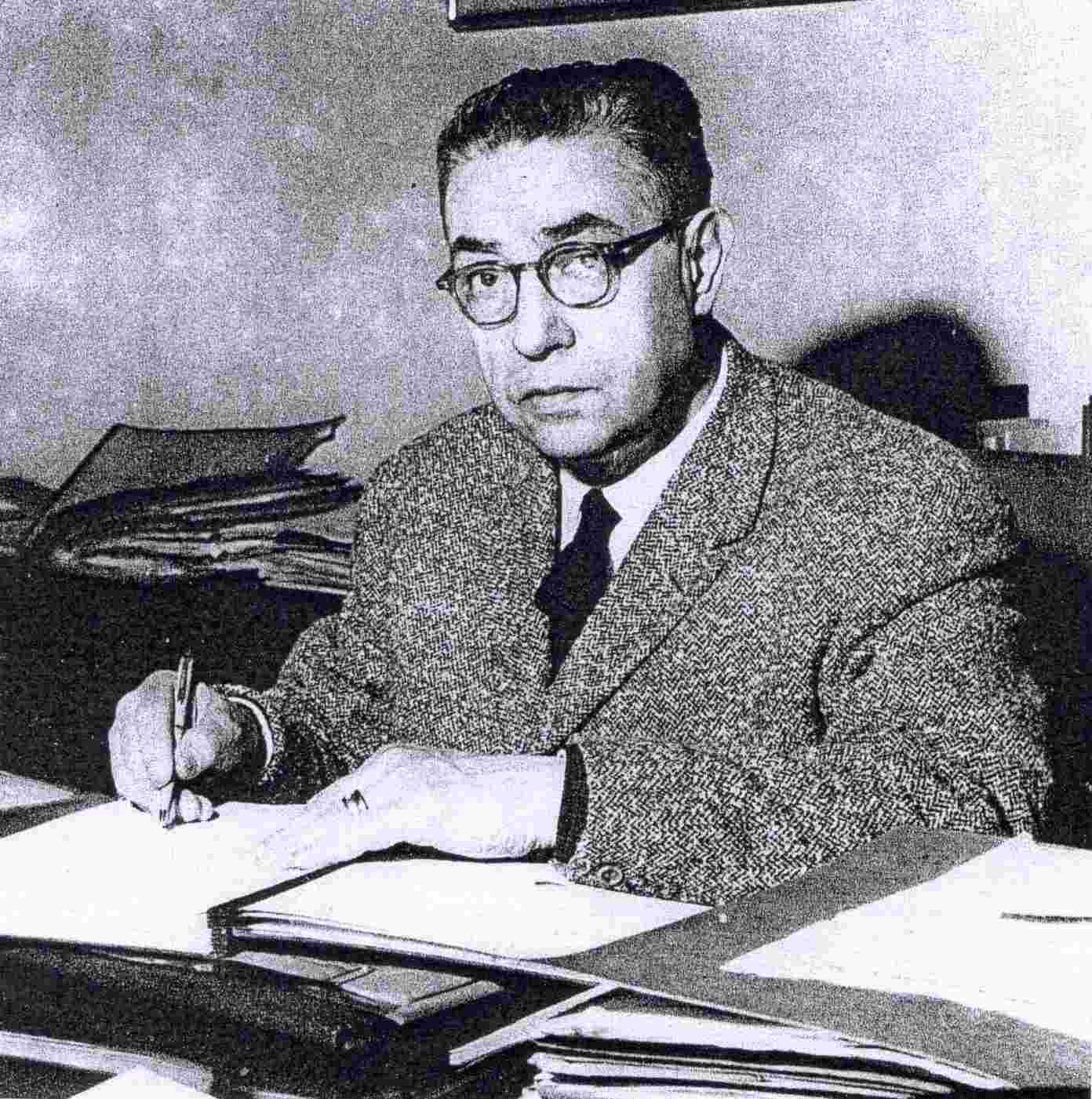
- Full name: Dr. Ing. Ottorino Barassi
- Born: 5 October 1898; Naples, Kingdom of Italy
- Died: 24 November 1971 (aged 73); Rome, Italy

Domestic
Years	League	Role
1944–1946	Italy	Commissioner
1946–1958	Italy	President

International
Years	League	Role
1952–1971	FIFA	Executive Committee

Ottorino Barassi (5 October 1898 – 24 November 1971) was an Italian sports official. The first action of his career was to help organise the 1934 FIFA World Cup, which was played in his native Italy.

His notability in World Cup history continued, as Italy won the 1938 FIFA World Cup in France. Because the World Cup did not take place for another 12 years due to World War II, he famously had possession of the Jules Rimet trophy until the 1950 FIFA World Cup. He secretly took the trophy home from a bank in Rome, and kept it under his bed in a shoebox so that the Nazi troops in Italy would not find it.

During the WW2, he was made commissioner of the Italian Football Federation from 1944 to 1946, and in 1946 he was promoted to president of the federation; a position which he would hold until 1958.

Following his good work in the 1934 World Cup, he was also asked by FIFA to help Brazilian officials organise the 1950 FIFA World Cup. This was a task which he completed successfully; he ensured that the Estádio do Maracanã was ready in time for the tournament, and that the event ran smoothly.

He was appointed as a member of FIFA's executive committee from 1952 until his death in 1971. As a member of the executive committee, he helped found UEFA in the early 1950s. The Coppa Ottorino Barassi, a match held from 1968–1976 between the FA Amateur Cup and Coppa Italia Dilettanti champions, was named after him. In 2011, he was posthumously inducted into the Italian Football Hall of Fame.
