= Jornal dos Sports =

Newspaper in Brazil

- Type: Regional daily sports newspaper
- Format: Broadsheet
- Publisher: Editora dos Sports Ltda.
- Founded: 13 March 1931; 95 years ago
- Ceased publication: 10 April 2010; 16 years ago
- Language: Portuguese
- Headquarters: Rio de Janeiro, RJ, Brazil
- Circulation: 30,000 (2004)
- Website: jsports.uol.com.br
- Free online archives: 15 March 1931 until 31 August 2004 (Nr. 2 – 23.213)

Jornal dos Sports was a traditional Brazilian sports newspaper from Rio de Janeiro which was published between 13 March 1931 and 10 April 2010. It was the oldest Brazilian daily sports newspaper, distributed mainly in Rio de Janeiro state.

Jornal dos Sports was well known in Brazil for its distinctive pink paper, similar to that of the Italian La Gazzetta dello Sport.

Among Jornal dos Sports most famous previous owners is Mário Filho, after whom the Maracanã Stadium is named.

== History ==
=== The beginning (1931–1936) ===
In 1931, Argemiro Bulcão was managing the newspaper Rio Sportivo, which was published twice a week in Rio de Janeiro. Interested in strengthening sports journalism, he proposed a partnership with Ozéas Mota, owner of the printing house where the newspaper was printed. With capital of six contos de réis, the two founded the Jornal dos Sports.

The idea embedded in the newspaper’s name—valuing all sports disciplines—was reinforced by its logo, which featured practitioners of discus throwing, weightlifting, tennis, football, golf, swimming, rowing, running, boxing, and horse riding.

Initially, each edition had only four pages, printed in black and white, and was sold for 100 réis. The editorials of the early years show Bulcão’s intention to make Jornal dos Sports a politically influential outlet. Signing as the newspaper’s director, he criticized the division in Rio de Janeiro football, then split between the Associação Metropolitana de Esportes Athleticos (AMEA) and the Liga Carioca de Futebol (LCF). The journalist advocated for the merger of the entities and the adoption of professionalism, a position that ultimately prevailed in 1937 with the founding of the Liga de Football do Rio de Janeiro (LFRJ). On 23 March 1936, the newspaper was printed for the first time on pink pages.

=== The Mário Filho years (1936–1966) ===
In October 1936, Mário Filho, who was already a contributor to Jornal dos Sports, received support from friends Roberto Marinho, José Bastos Padilha, and Arnaldo Guinle to purchase it from Argemiro Bulcão.

At the helm of the newspaper, Mário introduced a series of innovations. In the 1940s, he introduced comic strips and illustrations to depict the participation of clubs in the Rio de Janeiro football championship. With the full implementation of professionalism, the newspaper began covering topics related to club management, player transfers, salaries, and transfer fees. This coincided with the nationalism intensified by Brazil’s participation in World War II, with articles comparing players to soldiers of the Brazilian Expeditionary Force.

Shortly after the war, in 1946, Brazil was chosen by FIFA to host the 1950 FIFA World Cup. Composer Ary Barroso, then a city councilor in Rio de Janeiro, proposed the construction of a stadium in the Maracanã district. The proposal faced opposition from federal deputy Carlos Lacerda, who criticized the cost and location, suggesting it be moved to Jacarepaguá.

Mário Filho then began publishing a series of articles supporting the stadium’s construction. The campaign succeeded, with the cornerstone laid on 2 August 1948 and the Maracanã inaugurated on 16 June 1950. Mário Filho was also responsible for creating competitions organized by the newspaper, such as the Primavera Games (1947) and the Aterro do Flamengo street football tournament (1951). He also proposed the creation of the Torneio Rio-São Paulo. During this period, columnists such as José Lins do Rego and Nelson Rodrigues, Mário Filho’s brother, appeared in the newspaper.

In the early 1960s, the section Segundo Tempo ("Second Half") was created, focusing on arts and culture. Sports writers were joined by critics such as José Ramos Tinhorão and Alex Viany.

=== Mário Júlio Rodrigues (1967–1972) ===
In 1966, Mário Filho died of a heart attack at the age of 58. His widow, Célia Rodrigues, took over the newspaper. However, a year later, in 1967, she died by suicide. Journalist Mário Júlio Rodrigues, the couple’s son, became responsible for Jornal dos Sports. He had previously overseen the Segundo Tempo section and, inspired by changes occurring at Jornal do Brasil in the late 1960s and influenced by American new journalism, implemented an editorial overhaul. Contributors included Zuenir Ventura, Reinaldo Jardim, and Ana Arruda Callado. The list of collaborators also included cartoonists Ziraldo, Fortuna, and Jaguar, as well as composer Torquato Neto.

The most radical experiment, however, was the launch of the supplement O Sol. The project was a cultural section that hosted experimentation by young journalists from Brazil’s first communication schools. “O Sol nas bancas de revista” inspired Caetano Veloso’s song Alegria, Alegria. Launched in September 1967, O Sol became an independent newspaper two months later.

The counterculture atmosphere encouraged Mário Júlio to bring the newspaper closer to younger readers, with pages dedicated to education and related themes. He also supported the emerging "torcidas jovens" (youth supporter groups) in Rio de Janeiro.

This renewal also influenced cartoons and popular imagery. It was in Jornal dos Sports that Henfil created characters that became mascots of football supporters, such as the Urubu (replacing Popeye as the symbol of Flamengo) and the Bacalhau (representing Vasco da Gama, replacing the Portuguese admiral figure).

=== Cacilda de Souza (1972–1980) ===
Mário Júlio Rodrigues died in 1972 from complications related to alcoholism. To the surprise of his son Mário Rodrigues Neto, his will left control of the newspaper to his second wife, Cacilda Fernandes de Souza. As head of Jornal dos Sports, Cacilda Fernandes dismissed many long-time contributors. Editorial leadership passed to Colonel Geraldo Magalhães. With the change in editorial direction, which abandoned support for youth movements, many journalists moved to other publications such as Placar magazine.

The new owner also launched a supplement dedicated to spiritualist topics, ''Mundo Azul''.

=== Velloso family (1980–1999) ===
In 1980, the year of Nelson Rodrigues’ death, the newspaper faced serious financial difficulties and was sold to the Velloso family, who also controlled supermarket and pharmacy chains, among other businesses.

Climério Pereira Velloso, Waldemar Pereira Velloso, and Venâncio Pereira Velloso appointed Sérgio Gomes Velloso as executive director. The newspaper gave significant coverage to state deputy Napoleão Velloso (PMDB), also a family member. Educational content continued, focusing on university entrance exams and competitions.

Among contributors during this period, radio host Washington Rodrigues stood out, creator of the column Geraldinos e Arquibaldos, a reference to fan nicknames for different sections of the Maracanã stadium.

During this time, the supplement "Domingo é dia de Surf" ("Sunday is Surf Day") was created, the first weekly Brazilian publication dedicated to surfing and related sports such as bodyboarding. It was coordinated by Mauricio de Souza Coelho Neto, then director of ASPERJ, with contributions from Carlos Louro. The supplement covered international events in Australia, California, Hawaii, Fernando de Noronha, French Polynesia, and Easter Island.

After the death of editor-in-chief Duarte Gralheiro in 1989, Sérgio Velloso appointed journalist Geraldo Mainenti. He implemented major reforms, including the introduction of an ombudsman role, editorial restructuring, graphic redesign, and full-color front pages in 1990. He left shortly after the 1990 World Cup. Later editors included Sérgio Sá Leitão and Washington Rope.

By the late 1990s, Jornal dos Sports faced competition from the newly founded Lance! (1997), leading to modernization attempts. Financial decline led the Velloso family to sell the newspaper in 2000.

=== Final years ===
Businessman Omar Resende Peres Filho acquired Jornal dos Sports in 2000, appointing journalist Milton Coelho da Graça as editor-in-chief. Shortly afterward, ownership passed to Lourenço Rommel Peixoto and Armando Garcia Coelho, who also controlled Jornal de Brasília.

In 2001, the newsroom was moved from its historic headquarters in central Rio to Praça da Bandeira. Investments were made in equipment and new columnists such as José Inácio Werneck and Marcos de Castro were hired.

In 2004, Peixoto and Coelho were involved in Brazil’s Federal Police Operation Sanguessuga, which investigated corruption in medicine procurement at the Ministry of Health. Both were arrested.

After another crisis, the newspaper was acquired by businessman Wellington Rocha. Four years later, in 2008, a new group led by Arnaldo Cardoso Pires took control and moved the newsroom once again, this time to Rua do Ouvidor in central Rio. The newspaper continued circulating for two more years under the new management.

=== Return in 2022 ===
Currently, Jornal dos Sports has print circulation on match days in major sports arenas across the country, and also provides coverage of events, exclusive interviews, websites, social media, and e-commerce.
